= Israel in the Eurovision Song Contest 2018 =

- Eurovision Song Contest 2018
- Participating broadcaster: Israeli Public Broadcasting Corporation (IPBC/Kan)
- Country: Israel
- Selection process: Artist: HaKokhav HaBa L'Eirovizion; Song: Internal selection
- Selection date: Artist: 13 February 2018; Song: 11 March 2018

Competing entry
- Song: "Toy"
- Artist: Netta
- Songwriters: Doron Medalie; Stav Beger

Placement
- Semi-final result: Qualified (1st, 283 points)
- Final result: 1st, 529 points

Participation chronology

Israel was represented at the Eurovision Song Contest 2018 with the song "Toy", written by Doron Medalie and Stav Beger, and performed by Netta. The Israeli participating broadcaster, the Israeli Public Broadcasting Corporation (IPBC/Kan), organised the reality singing competition HaKokhav HaBa L'Eirovizion in collaboration with the commercial broadcaster Keshet and Tedy Productions to select its performer for the contest, while the song "Toy" was internally selected by a committee appointed by Kan. "Toy" went on to win the contest, marking Israel's fourth Eurovision win.

== Background ==
Prior to the 2018 contest, the Israel Broadcasting Authority (IBA) had participated in the Eurovision Song Contest representing Israel forty times since its first entry in 1973. It has won the contest on three occasions: in 1978 with the song "A-Ba-Ni-Bi" performed by Izhar Cohen and the Alphabeta, in 1979 with the song "Hallelujah" performed by Milk and Honey, and in 1998 with the song "Diva" performed by Dana International. Since the introduction of semi-finals to the format of the Eurovision Song Contest in 2004, Israel has, to this point, managed to qualify to the final seven times, including three top ten results in 2005 with "Hasheket Shenish'ar" performed by Shiri Maimon placing fourth, in 2008 with "The Fire in Your Eyes" by Boaz placing ninth, and in 2015 with "Golden Boy" by Nadav Guedj placing ninth. Israel had failed to qualify to the final for four consecutive years between 2011 and 2014 prior to their qualification in 2015. In 2017, "I Feel Alive" by Imri Ziv ended 23rd out of 26 entries in the final.

The 2017 contest was IBA's last television production and broadcast. On 15 May 2017, two days after the contest final, the Israeli Public Broadcasting Corporation (IPBC/Kan) was launched and replaced IBA as the Israeli public broadcaster. On 6 July 2017, the European Broadcasting Union (EBU) and IPBC announced an agreement that allowed the new corporation to participate in EBU events while its membership application to the union was reviewed and awaiting approval. Thanks to this agreement, IPBC was allowed to participate in the 2018 contest without having yet become a full member of the EBU. It was not until 7 December 2018 that the EBU General Assembly approved IPBC membership.

IPBC selected its entry for the 2018 contest through the reality singing competition HaKokhav HaBa L'Eirovizion ("The Next Star for Eurovision"), which was organised in collaboration with by Keshet and Tedy Productions. This was the fourth time that the Israeli entry was selected through a collaboration with these two companies.

== Before Eurovision ==
=== HaKokhav HaBa L'Eirovizion ===
The singer who would perform the Israeli entry for the Eurovision Song Contest 2018 was selected through the reality singing competition HaKokhav HaBa L'Eirovizion ("The Next Star for Eurovision"), the original version of the international format Rising Star, produced by Tedy Productions and Keshet Media Group. HaKokhav HaBa had been used since 2015 to select the Israeli artist for Eurovision. The shows was hosted by Assi Azar and Rotem Sela and featured a judging panel composed of Asaf Amdursky, Keren Peles, Harel Skaat (who represented Israel in 2010), and Static & Ben-El Tavori. The competition consisted of twenty shows, which commenced on 29 October 2017 and concluded on 13 February 2018. All shows in the competition were broadcast on Channel 2 and Keshet 12 as well as online via mako.co.il.

Out of the selected 120 contestants ninety-nine were shown in the televised auditions where performers were required to achieve 70% of the votes during their performance in order to advance; each member of the judging panel could boost a performer's score by 10%. Following a change in the rules of the competition, the hosts of the shows could also save performers who did not manage to achieve 70% of the votes during the audition phase, thus the selected performers would also advance, regardless to their scores during the auditions. In the end, seventy contestants advanced to the next round instead of the original seventy-one, following one contestant's withdrawal from the competition.

In the shortlisting round, the remaining seventy contestants were required to perform in front of the jury. The jury then selected twenty performers who qualified for the next stage of the competition.

The twenty performers were reduced to twelve in heat 1 and 2, and then from twelve to ten in heat 3 and 4.

==== Auditions ====
===== Audition 1 =====
The first audition was broadcast in two parts on 29 and 31 October 2017. Seven of the nine contestants advanced to the next phase following achieving at least 70% of the votes while one contestant who did not get enough votes to qualify was saved by the hosts.

Among the contestants was Chen Aharoni, who previously participated in the 2011 national final where he placed fourth with the song "Or".

Audition 1 – 29 and 31 October 2017
Draw	Artist	Song	Judges' vote				Presenters' vote		Score	Result
Draw	Artist	Song	A. Amdursky	K. Peles	H. Skaat	Static & B. El Tavori	R. Sela	A. Azar	Score	Result
1	Jaki Gaforov	"Feeling Good"	Yes	Yes	Yes	Yes	—	—	76%	Advanced
2	Adva Omer	"Ratsiti ledaber itcha"	No	Yes	Yes	Yes	—	—	73%	Advanced
3	Tamir Cohen	"Kol boker"	No	No	No	No	—	—	6%	Eliminated
4	Jonathan Mergui	"How Far I'll Go"	Yes	Yes	Yes	Yes	—	—	88%	Advanced
5	Mor Karbasi	"Im ha'ita ro'eh"	No	Yes	No	Yes	Save	Save	59%	Saved
6	Netta Barzilai	"Rude Boy"	Yes	Yes	Yes	Yes	—	—	82%	Advanced
7	Gal Yaakobi	"When I Was Your Man"	Yes	Yes	Yes	Yes	—	—	92%	Advanced
8	Hagar Yefet	"Ahava ka'zo (A Love Like This)"	No	Yes	Yes	Yes	—	—	78%	Advanced
9	Chen Aharoni	"Wrecking Ball"	Yes	Yes	Yes	Yes	—	—	94%	Advanced

===== Audition 2 =====
The second audition was broadcast on 5 November 2017. Six of the eight contestants advanced to the next phase following achieving at least 70% of the votes.

Among the contestants was Rinat Bar who previously participated in the 2005 national final where she placed seventh with the song "Kmo chalom".

Audition 2 – 5 November 2017
Draw	Artist	Song	Judges' vote				Presenters' vote		Score	Result
Draw	Artist	Song	A. Amdursky	K. Peles	H. Skaat	Static & B. El Tavori	R. Sela	A. Azar	Score	Result
1	Riki Ben Ari	"A Natural Woman"	Yes	Yes	Yes	Yes	—	—	93%	Advanced
2	Yissachar Hofi	"Kedey she elech"	Yes	No	No	No	—	—	50%	Eliminated
3	José Steinberg	"Despacito"	Yes	Yes	Yes	Yes	—	—	93%	Advanced
4	Eden Meiri	"Tachzeri"	Yes	Yes	No	Yes	—	—	76%	Advanced
5	Tslil Goldman	"Arms"	Yes	Yes	Yes	Yes	—	—	88%	Advanced
6	Amit Shekel	"Na'ara bemishkafaim"	Yes	No	Yes	Yes	—	—	67%	Eliminated
7	Rinat Bar	"Neshika (Kiss Kiss)"	Yes	Yes	Yes	Yes	—	—	79%	Advanced
8	Shir Baruch	"Hakol over"	No	Yes	Did not vote	Yes	—	—	72%	Advanced

===== Audition 3 =====
The third audition was broadcast on 12 November 2017. Five of the eight contestants advanced to the next phase following achieving at least 70% of the votes while one contestant who did not get enough votes to qualify was saved by the hosts.

Among the contestants was Alon Sharr, the lead singer of the band The Choice who previously took part in the Eurovision Song Contest 2017 as a backing vocalist behind Imri. Noa Bell is the adopted daughter of Keren Peles, therefore Peles was not able to vote during her audition. Her vote was cast by Ben-El Tavori.

Audition 3 – 12 November 2017
Draw	Artist	Song	Judges' vote				Presenters' vote		Score	Result
Draw	Artist	Song	A. Amdursky	K. Peles	H. Skaat	Static & B. El Tavori	R. Sela	A. Azar	Score	Result
1	Yafit Casay	"Listen"	Yes	Yes	Yes	Yes	—	—	95%	Advanced
2	Yossi Fitoussi	"Im at adain ohevet oti"	No	Yes	Yes	Yes	—	—	81%	Advanced
3	Hagai Atari	"Sheheriot meatzmi"	No	Yes	Yes	No	—	—	67%	Eliminated
4	Ravit Batashvili	"Island"	Yes	Yes	Yes	Yes	—	—	86%	Advanced
5	Shir Tzarfati	"Ein li otcha"	Yes	Yes	Yes	No	—	—	72%	Advanced
6	The Choice	"Yesh zman"	No	Yes	Yes	Yes	Save	Save	63%	Saved
7	Joey Bar	"Made of Stars"	No	No	No	No	—	—	4%	Eliminated
8	Noa Bell	"Yafa kalevana"	No	Yes	Yes	Yes	—	—	82%	Advanced

===== Audition 4 =====
The fourth audition was broadcast in two parts on 19 and 20 November 2017. Eight of the eleven contestants advanced to the next phase following achieving at least 70% of the votes while one contestant who did not get enough votes to qualify was saved by the hosts. However, on 26 November 2017 it was confirmed that Liat Banai, who has originally qualified to the next phase, has withdrawn from the competition.

Dori Halevi is a close friend of Ben-El Tavori, therefore Tavori was not able to vote during his audition.

Audition 4 – 19 and 20 November 2017
Draw	Artist	Song	Judges' vote				Presenters' vote		Score	Result
Draw	Artist	Song	A. Amdursky	K. Peles	H. Skaat	Static & B. El Tavori	R. Sela	A. Azar	Score	Result
1	Ofir Harush	"Yesh makom"	Yes	Yes	Yes	Yes	—	—	84%	Advanced
2	Yanir Shmiel	"Billie Jean"	No	Yes	Yes	Yes	—	—	76%	Advanced
3	O-Men	"It Ain't Me" (Note: The group performed their own Hebrew language cover of the song.)	No	No	No	No	—	—	38%	Eliminated
4	Orel Gilad	"Nigmar"	No	Yes	Yes	Yes	—	—	71%	Advanced
5	Tal Mizrahi	"American Idiot"	Yes	Yes	Yes	Yes	—	—	85%	Advanced
6	Hezi Katri	"Prachim bamidbar"	Yes	Yes	Yes	Yes	—	—	86%	Advanced
7	Regina Fedorenko	"Mango"	No	Yes	No	No	—	—	20%	Eliminated
8	Liat Banai	"Benadik"	Yes	Yes	Yes	Yes	—	—	86%	Withdrew
9	Shir Gadasi	"Elaich"	Yes	Yes	Yes	Yes	—	—	87%	Advanced
10	Eden Newman Hyatt	"I'm Stuck"	Yes	Yes	Yes	Yes	—	—	94%	Advanced
11	Dori Halevi	"Derech HaShalom"	No	Yes	No	Yes	Save	Save	56%	Saved

===== Audition 5 =====
The fifth audition was broadcast in two parts on 26 and 27 November 2017. Eight of the eleven contestants advanced to the next phase following achieving at least 70% of the votes while one contestant who did not get enough votes to qualify was saved by the hosts.

Among the contestants was Keshet Ben Ze'ev, the nephew of Izhar Cohen who (together with Alphabeta) won Eurovision for Israel in 1978 and finished fifth in 1985.

Audition 5 – 26 and 27 November 2017
Draw	Artist	Song	Judges' vote				Presenters' vote		Score	Result
Draw	Artist	Song	A. Amdursky	K. Peles	H. Skaat	Static & B. El Tavori	R. Sela	A. Azar	Score	Result
1	Osher Bachta	"Tocho ratsuf ahava"	No	Yes	Yes	Yes	—	—	83%	Advanced
2	Lior Chen	"Ein li otcha"	Yes	Yes	Yes	Yes	—	—	89%	Advanced
3	Lidor Ovadia	"Eifo at"	No	No	No	No	—	—	40%	Eliminated
4	Shay and Gilad	"Bli lehitkaven"	No	Yes	Yes	Yes	—	—	78%	Advanced
5	Sama Jabour	"Hallelujah"	Yes	Yes	No	Yes	—	—	74%	Advanced
6	Bar Grotsky	"Parparim"	No	Yes	Yes	Yes	—	—	78%	Advanced
7	Roy Ivgy	"Rak mitgagea"	No	No	No	Yes	—	—	61%	Eliminated
8	Keshet Ben Ze'ev	"Cold Water"	Yes	Yes	Yes	Yes	—	—	75%	Advanced
9	Howie Danao	"Don't"	Yes	Yes	No	Yes	—	—	81%	Advanced
10	Amit Moshe Oren	"Mevakesh slicha"	Yes	Yes	Yes	Yes	—	—	75%	Advanced
11	Or Abramov	"Shir achare milchama"	No	Yes	No	Yes	Save	Save	52%	Saved

===== Audition 6 =====
The sixth audition was broadcast in two parts on 3 and 4 December 2017. Six of the eleven contestants advanced to the next phase following achieving at least 70% of the votes while one contestant who did not get enough votes to qualify was saved by jury members Static and Ben-El Tavori instead of the hosts following a temporary switch in the roles during the contestants' audition.

Among the contestants was Joseph Guedj, a relative of Nadav Guedj who represented Israel in 2015.

Audition 6 – 3 and 4 December 2017
Draw	Artist	Song	Judges' vote				Presenters' vote		Score	Result
Draw	Artist	Song	A. Amdursky	K. Peles	H. Skaat	Static & B. El Tavori	R. Sela	A. Azar	Score	Result
1	Jordan Uzan	"I Wish"	No	Yes	Yes	Yes	—	—	77%	Advanced
2	Rivka Siyum	"Take a Bow"	Did not vote	Yes	Yes	Yes	—	—	76%	Advanced
3	Or Sela	"'Ashir lach kol yom"	No	No	No	Yes	—	—	37%	Eliminated
4	Stav Vaknin	"Ve'im preda"	Yes	Yes	No	Yes	—	—	81%	Advanced
5	Joseph Guedj	"Simanei hazman"	No	No	No	No	—	—	41%	Eliminated
6	Oded and Tzachi	"Thinking Out Loud"	Yes	Yes	No	Yes	—	—	77%	Advanced
7	Selfish Shepherd	"Run"	No	No	Yes	No	—	—	47%	Eliminated
8	Karin Mary Suliman	"Mazal moznaim"	No	No	No	Yes	Save	Save	50%	Saved
9	May Tor	"I'm Not the Only One"	Save	Save	Save	Save	—	—	89%	Advanced
10	Eliran Elias	"Yesh ein sof"	No	Yes	No	Yes	—	—	71%	Advanced
11	Amit Ben Dahan	"Hagoral haze"	No	Did not vote	No	Did not vote	—	—	34%	Eliminated

===== Audition 7 =====
The seventh audition was broadcast in two parts on 10 and 11 December 2017. Six of the eleven contestants advanced to the next phase following achieving at least 70% of the votes while one contestant who did not get enough votes to qualify was saved by the hosts.

Among the contestants was Almog Kapach who previously took part in the Eurovision Song Contest 2016 and 2017 as a backing vocalist behind Hovi Star and IMRI and also participated in the previous edition of the competition as a member of the band Beatbox Element, finishing fourth.

Audition 7 – 10 and 11 December 2017
Draw	Artist	Song	Judges' vote				Presenters' vote		Score	Result
Draw	Artist	Song	A. Amdursky	K. Peles	H. Skaat	Static & B. El Tavori	R. Sela	A. Azar	Score	Result
1	Ella Rubal	"Ulai ha'pa'am"	No	Yes	Yes	Yes	—	—	70%	Advanced
2	Haostri	"Tavi ta'chevre"	No	Yes	Yes	Yes	—	—	73%	Advanced
3	Yam Peretz	"Everything for Free"	No	No	No	No	—	Save	34%	Eliminated
4	Sarit Hativa	"Ratsiti ledaber itcha"	No	Yes	Yes	Yes	Save	Save	61%	Saved
5	Shelly Mogilevski	"Orot"	No	No	Yes	Yes	—	—	73%	Advanced
6	David Cohen	"Basof hakol holef"	No	No	No	No	—	—	36%	Eliminated
7	David Zamudio	"Rehab"	Yes	No	No	No	—	—	36%	Eliminated
8	Nissim	"Fly Away"	Yes	Yes	Yes	Yes	—	—	73%	Advanced
9	Almog Kapach	"Crazy" / "Crazy in Love"	No	Yes	Yes	Yes	—	—	82%	Advanced
10	Roni Brachel	"Sheva ba'erev"	No	No	No	No	—	—	44%	Eliminated
11	Axum	"Arnevet"	Yes	No	Yes	Yes	—	—	71%	Advanced

===== Audition 8 =====
The eighth audition was broadcast in two parts on 17 and 18 December 2017. Seven of the thirteen contestants advanced to the next phase following achieving at least 70% of the votes while two contestants who did not get enough votes to qualify were saved by the hosts.

Zohar Raziel would have originally got eliminated, however the judges exceptionally gave her a second chance to perform another song where she eventually advanced to the next stage of the competition.

Among the contestants was Mishéll who previously participated as Irina Rosenfeld in the 2006 Ukrainian national final where she placed second with the song "You Give Me Your Love".

Audition 8 – 17 and 18 December 2017
Draw	Artist	Song	Judges' vote				Presenters' vote		Score	Result
Draw	Artist	Song	A. Amdursky	K. Peles	H. Skaat	Static & B. El Tavori	R. Sela	A. Azar	Score	Result
1	Mike Uzan	"Earth Song"	Yes	No	No	Yes	—	—	72%	Advanced
2	Orian Rafael	"Bishvilech notzarti"	No	Yes	Yes	Did not vote	—	—	71%	Advanced
3	Jenny Polotsky	"When We Were Young"	Yes	Yes	No	Yes	—	—	81%	Advanced
4	Shir Mizrachi	"Luach vegir"	No	Yes	Yes	No	Save	Save	58%	Saved
5	Shay Gal	"Tskhovreba mshvenieria"	No	No	No	No	—	—	43%	Eliminated
6	Lior Halevi	"Kol yom k'mo nes"	Yes	Yes	Yes	No	—	—	79%	Advanced
7	Johnny Koren	"Let It Go"	No	Yes	No	No	—	—	29%	Eliminated
8	Zohar Raziel	"Empty Heart"	Yes	Yes	No	No	—	—	62%	~~Eliminated~~
9	Zohar Raziel	"Back to Black"	Yes	Yes	Yes	Yes	—	—	97%	Advanced
10	Barak Mizrahi	"Aramam"	Yes	Yes	Yes	Yes	—	—	76%	Advanced
11	Cedrick Kanyinda	"African Boy"	Yes	Yes	Did not vote	No	—	—	45%	Eliminated
12	Mishéll	"I Got You (I Feel Good)"	No	Yes	Yes	Yes	—	—	79%	Advanced
13	Nathaniel Sabag	"Shir la'ima"	No	Yes	No	No	—	—	46%	Eliminated
14	Vicky Kleichman	"Into You"	No	Yes	No	No	Save	Save	43%	Saved

===== Audition 9 =====
The ninth audition was broadcast on 21 December 2017. Four of the eight contestants advanced to the next phase following achieving at least 70% of the votes while one contestant who did not get enough votes to qualify was saved by the hosts.

Audition 9 – 21 December 2017
Draw	Artist	Song	Judges' vote				Presenters' vote		Score	Result
Draw	Artist	Song	A. Amdursky	K. Peles	H. Skaat	Static & B. El Tavori	R. Sela	A. Azar	Score	Result
1	Asael Tzanani	"Homot"	No	No	Yes	No	Save	Save	52%	Saved
2	Yakir Itzkovich Cohen	"Ve'im preda"	No	Yes	Yes	No	—	—	71%	Advanced
3	Inbal Raz	"Shape of You"	No	No	No	No	—	—	36%	Eliminated
4	Priel Yoshua Fitoussi	"Od yihye li"	Yes	Yes	Yes	No	—	—	76%	Advanced
5	Maya Banai	"Love on the Brain"	No	Yes	No	Yes	—	—	73%	Advanced
6	Yossi Mark	"Versace on the Floor"	Yes	Yes	Yes	Yes	—	—	85%	Advanced
7	Yisrael Shalom	"Hi limda oti et hayodel"	No	Yes	Yes	Yes	—	—	69%	Eliminated
8	Niso Siman Tov	"Mami"	No	No	Did not vote	Did not vote	—	—	37%	Eliminated

===== Audition 10 =====
The tenth audition was broadcast in two parts on 24 and 25 December 2017. Three of the nine contestants advanced to the next phase following achieving at least 70% of the votes while two contestants who did not get enough votes to qualify were saved by the hosts.

Audition 10 – 24 and 25 December 2017
Draw	Artist	Song	Judges' vote				Presenters' vote		Score	Result
Draw	Artist	Song	A. Amdursky	K. Peles	H. Skaat	Static & B. El Tavori	R. Sela	A. Azar	Score	Result
1	Tangier	"Mehayom shehalacht" / "Ya Rayah"	No	No	Did not vote	Yes	Save	Save	49%	Saved
2	Dudi Atar	"Bati elaich"	No	No	No	Yes	—	—	53%	Eliminated
3	Michael Kobrin	"Human"	Yes	Yes	Yes	Yes	—	—	88%	Advanced
4	Benjamin Tappesa	"Im haya li"	No	No	Did not vote	No	—	—	13%	Eliminated
5	Nofar Haber	"When We Were Young"	No	Yes	No	Yes	—	—	72%	Advanced
6	Shusha Mansour	"Aba"	Yes	Yes	Yes	Yes	Save	Save	68%	Saved
7	Sher Rahmani	"Lost on You"	No	No	No	No	—	—	35%	Eliminated
8	Amaya	"Ba li m'siba"	No	No	Yes	No	—	—	38%	Eliminated
9	Michael Dahan	"Tocho ratsuf ahava"	No	Yes	Yes	Yes	—	—	71%	Advanced

==== Shortlisting round ====
The shortlisting round was broadcast in two parts on 28 and 31 December 2017. The remaining seventy contestants performed in front of the jury. Following the performances, the four-member jury selected twenty contestants to go through to the heats.

==== Elimination shows ====
===== Heat 1 =====
The first heat was broadcast on 4 January 2018. Eight of the twenty qualified contestants were paired in four duels. From each duel, the performer with the higher score advanced to the next round while one contestant was saved by the jury at the end of the second part of the second heat.

For the first time in the history of the competition, a guest judge also voted for the performances: Ninet Tayeb, singer-songwriter, composer, DJ, model and actress. Therefore, each judge could boost each performance by 8% instead of the original 10.

Heat 1 – 4 January 2018
Duel	Draw	Artist	Song	Judges' vote					Score	Result
Duel	Draw	Artist	Song	A. Amdursky	K. Peles	N. Tayeb	H. Skaat	Static & B. El Tavori	Score	Result
I	1	Rinat Bar	"Ya Habibi"	Yes	Yes	Yes	Yes	Yes	77%	Saved
I	2	Riki Ben Ari	"Greatest Love of All"	Yes	Yes	Yes	Yes	No	82%	Advanced
II	3	Jonathan Mergui	"Talk Dirty"	Yes	Yes	Yes	Yes	Yes	88%	Advanced
II	4	Axum	"Ba lashchuna bachur hadash"	Yes	Yes	Yes	Yes	Yes	74%	Eliminated
III	5	Tal Mizrahi	"Basket Case"	Yes	No	No	Yes	Yes	49%	Eliminated
III	6	Netta Barzilai	"Hey Mama"	Yes	Yes	Yes	Yes	Did not vote	79%	Advanced
IV	7	Ravit Batashvili	"Harbe mimech nishar"	Yes	Yes	Yes	Yes	Yes	82%	Advanced
IV	8	Ofir Harush	"Mangina"	Yes	Yes	No	No	Yes	68%	Eliminated

===== Heat 2 =====
The second heat was broadcast in two parts on 7 and 8 January 2018. The remaining twelve of the twenty contestants were paired in six duels. From each duel, the performer with the higher score advanced to the next round while one contestant was saved by the jury at the end of the second part of the second heat.

Heat 2 – 7 and 8 January 2018
Duel	Draw	Artist	Song	Judges' vote					Score	Result
Duel	Draw	Artist	Song	A. Amdursky	K. Peles	N. Tayeb	H. Skaat	Static & B. El Tavori	Score	Result
I	1	Chen Aharoni	"Can't Feel My Face"	Yes	Yes	Yes	Yes	Yes	80%	Advanced
I	2	Shir Baruch	"Shuvi leveitech"	No	No	No	No	No	30%	Eliminated
II	3	The Choice	"Omed al tzuk"	Yes	No	No	No	Yes	56%	Eliminated
II	4	Sarit Hativa	"Shav"	No	No	Yes	Yes	Yes	60%	Advanced
III	5	Eden Meiri	"Nagen"	No	Yes	No	Yes	Yes	63%	Advanced
III	6	Shir Gadasi	"Bayamim she'yaavru aleinu"	No	No	No	Did not vote	No	26%	Eliminated
IV	7	Shay and Gilad	"Yarok udvash"	Yes	Yes	Yes	No	Yes	71%	Advanced
IV	8	Adva Omer	"Aba"	No	Yes	No	No	Yes	49%	Saved
V	9	Jaki Gaforov	"That's What I Like"	Yes	No	No	Yes	No	52%	Eliminated
V	10	José Steinberg	"El Perdón"	No	Yes	Yes	No	Yes	63%	Advanced
VI	11	Howie Danao	"Take Me to Church"	No	No	No	No	Yes	56%	Advanced
VI	12	Gal Yaakobi	"Mashehu mimeni"	No	No	No	No	No	36%	Eliminated

===== Heat 3 =====
The third heat was broadcast on 14 January 2018 and consisted of two rounds: in the first round six of the remaining twelve contestants were paired in three duels. From each duel, the performer with the higher score advanced to the next stage of the competition. In the second round the remaining three contestants would have had to perform one more song and the contestant with the lowest score would have got eliminated. However, following her performance Rinat Bar announced her withdrawal from the competition. Therefore, the remaining two contestants – Shay and Gilad and Riki Ben Ari – automatically qualified for the next stage without Riki Ben Ari performing.

Heat 3 – First round – 14 January 2018
Duel	Draw	Artist	Song	Judges' vote				Score	Result
Duel	Draw	Artist	Song	A. Amdursky	K. Peles	H. Skaat	Static & B. El Tavori	Score	Result
I	1	Rinat Bar	"Hi"	Yes	No	No	No	50%	Second round
I	2	Howie Danao	"Od nagia"	No	Yes	Yes	Yes	82%	Advanced
II	3	José Steinberg (Note: In the first round both José Steinberg and Shay and Gilad performed together with the Israeli singer Rotem Cohen.)	"Como el agua"	Yes	Yes	Yes	Yes	82%	Advanced
II	4	Shay and Gilad	"El ha'olam shelach"	No	No	No	No	36%	Second round
III	5	Ravit Batashvili	"At"	Yes	Yes	Yes	No	76%	Advanced
III	6	Riki Ben Ari	"Ya mama / Mehayom shehalacht"	Yes	No	No	No	56%	Second round

Heat 3 – Second Round
Duel	Draw	Artist	Song	Judges' vote				Score	Result
Duel	Draw	Artist	Song	A. Amdursky	K. Peles	H. Skaat	Static & B. El Tavori	Score	Result
IV	7	Shay and Gilad	"Al tishali"	Yes	No	No	Yes	50%	Advanced
IV	8	Rinat Bar	"Betelem ohavim"	Yes	No	Did not vote	No	49%	Withdrew
IV	9	Riki Ben Ari	—	—	—	—	—	—	Advanced

===== Heat 4 =====
The fourth heat was broadcast on 21 January 2018 and consisted of two rounds: in the first round six of the remaining twelve contestants were paired in three duels. From each duel, the performer with the higher score advanced to the next stage of the competition. In the second round the remaining three contestants had to perform one more song and the contestant with the lowest score got eliminated.

For personal reasons one of the judges, Asaf Amdursky did not attend the fourth heat. To complement the jury panel, Nadav Guedj, the winner of the second season and who represented Israel in 2015, was invited to vote.

Heat 4 – First round – 21 January 2018
Duel	Draw	Artist	Song	Judges' vote				Score	Result
Duel	Draw	Artist	Song	H. Skaat	K. Peles	n. Guedj	Static & B. El Tavori	Score	Result
I	1	Sarit Hativa (Note: In the first round both Sarit Hativa and Adva Omer performed together with the Israeli singer Dudu Aharon.)	"Hagoral haze"	Yes	No	Yes	No	53%	Second round
I	2	Adva Omer	"Hashir shelach"	Yes	Yes	Yes	Yes	83%	Advanced
II	3	Eden Meiri	"Enatzel"	Yes	Yes	No	No	56%	Second round
II	4	Netta Barzilai	"Papi chulo" / "Sing Hallelujah!" / "Hachaiyim shelanu tutim"	Yes	Yes	Yes	Yes	73%	Advanced
III	5	Chen Aharoni	"Sheket"	No	Yes	Yes	Yes	71%	Advanced
III	6	Jonathan Mergui	"Basof hakol holef"	No	No	Yes	Yes	62%	Second round

Heat 4 – Second round
Duel	Draw	Artist	Song	Judges' vote				Score	Result
Duel	Draw	Artist	Song	H. Skaat	K. Peles	n. Guedj	Static & B. El Tavori	Score	Result
IV	7	Sarit Hativa	"Malkat halevavot"	Yes	No	No	No	30%	Eliminated
IV	8	Eden Meiri	"Elohay"	Yes	Yes	Yes	No	80%	Advanced
IV	9	Jonathan Mergui	"Love Yourself"	Yes	Yes	Yes	Yes	89%	Advanced

===== Heat 5 =====
The fifth heat was broadcast on 22 January 2018 and consisted of two rounds. In the first round the remaining ten contestants were paired in four thematical duels: in the first duel two duets were formed from four contestants. In the second duel the two contestants performed songs of their idols. In the third duel the contestants who have sung ballads before performed uptempo songs for the first time and in the fourth duel the two contestants performed in front of their relatives. From each duel the contestant or contestants with the higher score advanced to the next stage of the competition. In the end of the first round three contestants were saved by the judges and the remaining two contestants had to perform one more song in the second round. In the end the contestant with the lowest score got eliminated.

Heat 5 – First round – 22 January 2018
Duel	Draw	Artist	Song	Judges' vote				Score	Result
Duel	Draw	Artist	Song	A. Amdursky	K. Peles	H. Skaat	Static & B. El Tavori	Score	Result
I	1	Chen Aharoni and Jonathan Mergui	"Locked Out of Heaven"	Yes	Yes	Yes	Yes	92%	Advanced
I	2	Adva Omer and Eden Meiri	"Yesh bi ahava"	Yes	Yes	Yes	No	66%	Saved
II	3	José Steinberg	"Thinking Out Loud"	No	No	No	Yes	53%	Second round
II	4	Riki Ben Ari	"The Best"	No	Yes	Yes	Yes	64%	Advanced
III	5	Ravit Batashvili	"Tel Aviv"	Yes	Yes	Yes	No	74%	Advanced
III	6	Shay and Gilad	"Kos shel yain"	No	No	Did not vote	No	36%	Second round
IV	7	Howie Danao	"Hero"	No	No	Yes	Yes	69%	Saved
IV	8	Netta Barzilai	"What Is Love"	Yes	Yes	Yes	Yes	79%	Advanced

Heat 5 – Second round
Duel	Draw	Artist	Song	Judges' vote				Score	Result
Duel	Draw	Artist	Song	A. Amdursky	K. Peles	H. Skaat	Static & B. El Tavori	Score	Result
V	9	Shay and Gilad	"Nahon lehayom"	No	No	Did not vote	No	28%	Eliminated
V	10	José Steinberg	"Algo especial"	Yes	Yes	No	Yes	82%	Advanced

===== Heat 6 =====
The sixth heat was broadcast in two parts on 28 and 29 January 2018. All the contestants performed behind the wall except for the first contestant Adva Omer who performed in front of the judges and the audience. In the end the contestant with the lowest score got eliminated.

Heat 6 – 28 and 29 January 2018
Draw	Artist	Song	Judges' vote				Score	Result
Draw	Artist	Song	A. Amdursky	K. Peles	H. Skaat	Static & B. El Tavori	Score	Result
1	Adva Omer	"Alabina"	No	Yes	Yes	Yes	63%	Advanced
2	Riki Ben Ari	"If I Ain't Got You"	Yes	Yes	Yes	Yes	88%	Advanced
3	Chen Aharoni	"Grenade"	Yes	Yes	Yes	Yes	86%	Advanced
4	Jonathan Mergui	"Roar"	Yes	Yes	Yes	Yes	89%	Advanced
5	José Steinberg	"Smooth"	Yes	Yes	Yes	No	62%	Eliminated
6	Howie Danao	"Troublemaker"	Yes	No	Yes	Yes	75%	Advanced
7	Netta Barzilai	"Barbie Girl"	Yes	Yes	Yes	No	70%	Advanced
8	Ravit Batashvili (Note: During her performance Ravit Batashvili was joined by the Israeli singer Idan Amedi.)	"Elaich"	Yes	Yes	Yes	No	79%	Advanced
9	Eden Meiri	"Haperach begani"	Yes	Yes	Yes	Yes	79%	Advanced

===== Quarter-final =====
The quarter-final was broadcast in two parts on 4 and 7 February 2018 and consisted of two rounds: in the first round the remaining eight contestants were paired in four duels. From each duel, the performer with the higher score advanced to the next stage of the competition. In the second round the remaining four contestants were paired in two duels and had to perform one more song. The two contestants with the lower scores from each duel got eliminated.

In the end of the first round the judges selected two contestants from the four first round qualifiers – Netta Barzilai and Riki Ben Ari – who got paired in a duel that determined the first finalist in the first part of the semi-final.

In addition to the performances the winner of the previous season and representative of Israel in the Eurovision Song Contest 2017, IMRI performed the 2017 Israeli entry "I Feel Alive".

Quarter-final – First round – 4 and 7 February 2018
Duel	Draw	Artist	Song	Judges' vote				Score	Result
Duel	Draw	Artist	Song	A. Amdursky	K. Peles	H. Skaat	Static & B. El Tavori	Score	Result
I	1	Eden Meiri	"Lipol"	No	Yes	Yes	Yes	71%	Second round
I	2	Netta Barzilai	"Wannabe"	Yes	Yes	Yes	Yes	90%	Selected by the Judges
II	3	Chen Aharoni	"Rokedet"	No	Yes	Yes	Yes	71%	Advanced
II	4	Adva Omer	"Lomedet lalechet"	No	Yes	No	No	44%	Second round
III	5	Ravit Batashvili	"Al tidag"	No	Yes	Yes	No	56%	Second round
III	6	Riki Ben Ari	"Ani haya li mi'yom le'yom"	Yes	Yes	No	Yes	76%	Selected by the Judges
IV	7	Jonathan Mergui	"Versace on the Floor"	Yes	Yes	Yes	No	78%	Advanced
IV	8	Howie Danao	"Habachor habayshan al psanter"	No	No	Yes	Yes	61%	Second round

Quarter-final – Second round – 4 and 7 February 2018
Duel	Draw	Artist	Song	Judges' vote				Score	Result
Duel	Draw	Artist	Song	A. Amdursky	K. Peles	H. Skaat	Static & B. El Tavori	Score	Result
V	9	Howie Danao	"Believer"	Yes	Yes	Yes	Yes	85%	Advanced
V	10	Adva Omer	"Ad matai elohay"	No	Yes	Yes	Yes	58%	Eliminated
VI	11	Ravit Batashvili	"El ha'olam shelach"	Yes	Yes	Yes	Yes	77%	Eliminated
VI	12	Eden Meiri	"Va'ani kore lach"	Yes	Yes	Yes	Yes	84%	Advanced

===== Semi-final =====
The semi-final was broadcast in two sefond parts on 8 and 11 February 2018.

In the first part on 8 February the two contestants who were selected by the judges in the quarter-final – Netta Barzilai and Riki Ben Ari – were paired in a duel that determined the first finalist. In addition to their performances Barzilai and Ben Ari performed "Na'im achshav" by and together with Elai Botner and The Outside Kids before the duel.

The second part of the semi-final was broadcast on 11 February and consisted of two rounds: in the first round all the remaining five contestants performed behind the wall except for the first contestant Chen Aharoni who performed in front of the judges and the audience. In the end of the first round the contestant with the highest score qualified for the final.

In the second round the remaining four contestants were paired in two duels and had to perform one more song. The two contestants with the higher scores from each duel qualified for the final.

Semi-final – First part – 8 February 2018
Duel	Draw	Artist	Song	Judges' vote				Score	Result
Duel	Draw	Artist	Song	A. Amdursky	K. Peles	H. Skaat	Static & B. El Tavori	Score	Result
I	1	Riki Ben Ari	"Hei shketa"	No	No	No	No	42%	Second part
I	2	Netta Barzilai	"Beautiful"	No	Yes	Yes	Yes	67%	Finalist

Semi-final – Second part (first round) – 11 February 2018
Draw	Artist	Song	Judges' vote				Score	Result
Draw	Artist	Song	A. Amdursky	K. Peles	H. Skaat	Static & B. El Tavori	Score	Result
1	Chen Aharoni	"Bang Bang"	Yes	Yes	Yes	Yes	86%	Finalist
2	Eden Meiri	"Yareach"	No	Yes	Yes	Yes	71%	Second round
3	Riki Ben Ari	"Set Fire to the Rain"	Yes	Yes	No	Yes	75%	Second round
4	Howie Danao	"I'm Not the Only One"	No	No	No	Yes	52%	Second round
5	Jonathan Mergui	"Wake Me Up"	Yes	Yes	No	No	63%	Second round

Semi-final – Second part (second round) – 11 February 2018
Duel	Draw	Artist	Song	Judges' vote				Score	Result
Duel	Draw	Artist	Song	A. Amdursky	K. Peles	H. Skaat	Static & B. El Tavori	Score	Result
I	6	Riki Ben Ari	"Vision of Love"	Yes	Yes	Yes	Yes	82%	Finalist
I	7	Eden Meiri	"Kvar avru hashanim"	Yes	Yes	Yes	Yes	76%	Eliminated
II	8	Howie Danao	"Lately"	No	Yes	No	Yes	52%	Eliminated
II	9	Jonathan Mergui	"Against All Odds"	Yes	Yes	Yes	Yes	88%	Finalist

===== Final =====
The final took place on 13 February 2018 and consisted of two rounds.

====== First round ======
In the first round the four finalists were paired in two duels. From each duel the contestant with the higher score advanced to the second round. After the last performance each jury member (with the exception of Harel Skaat) named one of the remaining two contestants. The contestant with the most votes advanced to the second round.

In addition to the performances the four finalists performed a medley of the Eurovision Song Contest 2012 winning song "Euphoria" by Loreen and "Can't Hold Us" by Macklemore & Ryan Lewis feat. Ray Dalton.

Final – First round – 13 February 2018
Duel	Draw	Artist	Song	Judges' vote				Score	Result
Duel	Draw	Artist	Song	A. Amdursky	K. Peles	H. Skaat	Static & B. El Tavori	Score	Result
I	1	Jonathan Mergui	"Get Ugly"	Yes	Yes	Yes	Yes	90%	Second round
I	2	Chen Aharoni	"Neshima"	Yes	Yes	Yes	Yes	72%	Eliminated
II	3	Riki Ben Ari	"Proud Mary"	Yes	Yes	Yes	Yes	81%	Second round
II	4	Netta Barzilai	"Kzat meshugat"	Yes	Yes	Yes	Yes	74%	Saved

The votes of the judges to save:

- Asaf Amdursky – Netta Barzilai
- Keren Peles – Netta Barzilai
- Harel Skaat – did not vote
- Static – Netta Barzilai
- Ben El Tavori – Chen Aharoni

Harel Skaat did not have to vote since it was already decided that Netta Barzilai would be saved from elimination.

====== Second round ======
In the second round, the remaining three contestants performed in front of the judges and the audience. During each performance the votes were cast only by the viewers through the official mobile application, without the scores appearing on screen. After the last performance each judge cast its votes by giving 8, 10 and 12 points to the three remaining contestants; 8 points to their third favourite and 12 points to their favourite. Additionally, four thematical jury groups were asked to vote by the same method. The members of the four jury groups were:

- Group 1: Judges of Kokhav Nolad – Gal Uchovsky, Margalit Tzan'ani, Tzedi Tzarfati
- Group 2: Winners of HaKokhav HaBa L'Eurovizion that represented Israel in Eurovision in the past three years – Nadav Guedj, Hovi Star, Imri Ziv
- Group 3: Judges of Eyal Golan Is Calling You – Adi Leon, Yaron Ilan, Yossi Gispan
- Group 4: Composers of former Israeli Eurovision Song Contest entries – Doron Medalie, Kobi Oshrat, Svika Pick

In addition to the performances, the second round included guest performances of "Namaste" by the judges Static & Ben El Tavori, and "Ulay nedaber" by the 2015 Israeli representative Nadav Guedj.

Final – Second round – 13 February 2018
Draw	Artist	Song	Jury	Viewers	Total	Place
1	Riki Ben Ari	"Total Eclipse of the Heart"	78	47	125	3
2	Jonathan Mergui	"When I Was Your Man"	88	117	205	2
3	Netta Barzilai	"Tik Tok" / "Gangnam Style"	104	106	210	1

Detailed jury votes
Artist	HaKokhav HaBa Judges					Jury Groups				Total
Artist	K. Peles	Static	A. Amdursky	H. Skaat	B. El Tavori	Group 1	Group 2	Group 3	Group 4	Total
Riki Ben Ari	8	8	8	8	8	8	10	10	10	78
Jonathan Mergui	10	12	10	10	12	10	8	8	8	88
Netta Barzilai	12	10	12	12	10	12	12	12	12	104

== At Eurovision ==
According to Eurovision rules, all nations with the exceptions of the host country and the "Big Five" (France, Germany, Italy, Spain, and the United Kingdom) are required to qualify from one of two semi-finals in order to compete for the final; the top ten countries from each semi-final progress to the final. The European Broadcasting Union (EBU) split up the competing countries into six different pots based on voting patterns from previous contests, with countries with favourable voting histories put into the same pot. On 29 January 2018, a special allocation draw was held which placed each country into one of the two semi-finals, as well as which half of the show they would perform in. Israel was placed into the first semi-final, to be held on 8 May 2018, and was scheduled to perform in the first half of the show.

Once all the competing songs for the 2018 contest had been released, the running order for the semi-finals was decided by the shows' producers rather than through another draw, so that similar songs were not placed next to each other. Israel was set to perform in position 7, following the entry from Lithuania and preceding the entry from Belarus.

=== Semi-final ===
Israel was an early favorite with bookmakers, sitting in second place to win on the day of the first semi-final. Israel performed seventh in the first semi-final, following the entry from Lithuania and preceding the entry from Belarus. At the end of the night, Israel was one of the ten countries announced as qualifying for the grand final, their fourth qualification in a row since 2015. Following the semi-final, Netta joined the other new finalists in a press conference and a draw to see which half of the final she would perform in. Ultimately, Israel was drawn to perform in the second half of the final. It was later revealed that Israel won the first semi-final, scoring 283 points, 116 points from the televoting and 167 points from the juries.

=== Final ===
Israel performed twenty-second in the grand final, following Hungary and preceding the Netherlands. Following the jury vote, Israel was in third place behind Sweden in second and Austria first. However, neither Sweden nor Austria made it to the viewers' top ten, allowing Israel to both win the televote and the contest overall with a total of 529 points (Israel's highest-ever score). This marked Israel's fourth victory (after 1978, 1979, and 1998), tying them with the Netherlands as the 4th-most successful country in contest history (following France, Luxembourg, and the United Kingdom, with five wins; Sweden, with six wins; and Ireland, with seven wins). It was the twentieth time Israel finished in the top ten (the last occasion being Nadav Guedj and "Golden Boy," which finished 9th in 2015) and the eleventh they made the top five (the first time since 2005, when Shiri Maimon came 4th with "HaSheket SheNish'ar"). This meant Israel would host the 2019 contest and automatically qualify for the following year's final. Among these points were five top marks from the jury vote (awarded by Austria, the Czech Republic, Finland, France, and San Marino) and eight top marks from the televote (awarded by Australia, Azerbaijan, Georgia, Moldova, Spain, Ukraine, and once again France and San Marino). Estonia was the only country that did not award any points to Israel in either jury vote or televote.

Under the hybrid jury-televote system, Israel would have received twelve points from Armenia, Australia, Austria, Bulgaria, Croatia, Czech Republic, Finland, France, Iceland, Italy, Moldova, San Marino, Spain, Sweden, Ukraine, and the United Kingdom.

=== Voting ===
Voting during the three shows involved each country awarding two sets of points from 1–8, 10 and 12: one from their professional jury and the other from televoting. Each nation's jury consisted of five music industry professionals who are citizens of the country they represent, with their names published before the contest to ensure transparency. This jury judged each entry based on: vocal capacity; the stage performance; the song's composition and originality; and the overall impression by the act. In addition, no member of a national jury was permitted to be related in any way to any of the competing acts in such a way that they cannot vote impartially and independently. The individual rankings of each jury member as well as the nation's televoting results were released shortly after the grand final.

==== Points awarded to Israel ====
Points awarded to Israel (Semi-final 1)
Score	Televote	Jury
12 points	Czech Republic	Armenia; Austria; Croatia; Cyprus; Czech Republic; Finland; Spain
10 points	Azerbaijan; Belarus; Finland	Albania; Iceland; Ireland
8 points	Cyprus; Iceland; Switzerland	United Kingdom
7 points	Bulgaria; Spain	Belgium; Lithuania
6 points	Austria	Belarus
5 points	Ireland; United Kingdom	Bulgaria; Macedonia; Switzerland
4 points	Albania; Armenia	Azerbaijan; Greece
3 points	Belgium; Macedonia	
2 points	Greece; Portugal	Portugal
1 point	Estonia; Lithuania	

Points awarded to Israel (final)
Score	Televote	Jury
12 points	Australia; Azerbaijan; France; Georgia; Moldova; San Marino; Spain; Ukraine	Austria; Czech Republic; Finland; France; San Marino
10 points	Armenia; Belgium; Bulgaria; Cyprus; Czech Republic; Germany; Hungary; Netherlands; Poland; Russia; Sweden	Croatia; Moldova; Spain; Ukraine; United Kingdom
8 points	Belarus; Latvia; Malta; Romania	Armenia; Iceland; Russia
7 points	Austria; Finland; Iceland; Italy; Norway; Serbia; United Kingdom	Ireland; Sweden
6 points	Croatia; Greece; Ireland	Australia; Belgium; Hungary; Lithuania; Malta
5 points	Switzerland	Albania; Netherlands
4 points		Bulgaria; Greece
3 points	Macedonia	Denmark; Georgia
2 points		Italy; Serbia
1 point	Albania; Lithuania; Montenegro; Portugal	Azerbaijan; Germany; Macedonia; Portugal; Slovenia; Switzerland

==== Points awarded by Israel ====
Points awarded by Israel (Semi-final 1)
Score	Televote	Jury
12 points	Czech Republic	Austria
10 points	Cyprus	Azerbaijan
8 points	Austria	Switzerland
7 points	Estonia	Finland
6 points	Finland	Croatia
5 points	Azerbaijan	Armenia
4 points	Ireland	Albania
3 points	Bulgaria	Czech Republic
2 points	Belgium	Lithuania
1 point	Switzerland	Macedonia

Points awarded by Israel (final)
Score	Televote	Jury
12 points	Czech Republic	Austria
10 points	Moldova	Sweden
8 points	Estonia	United Kingdom
7 points	Ukraine	Australia
6 points	France	Finland
5 points	Italy	Germany
4 points	Denmark	Slovenia
3 points	Germany	Hungary
2 points	Cyprus	Denmark
1 point	Austria	Bulgaria

==== Detailed voting results ====
The following members comprised the Israeli jury:

- Aya Korem (jury chairperson) – singer, songwriter (jury member in semi-final 1)
- Eli Cohen (Eliko) – radio DJ
- Dafna Lustig – music journalist, radio DJ, TV host
- Yaakov Lamai – musical producer, arranger
- Gal Uchovsky – music journalist
- Hagai Uzan – music journalist, producer, personal artist manager (jury member in the final)

Detailed voting results from Israel (Semi-final 1)
Draw	Country	Jury							Televote	
Draw	Country	A. Korem	Eliko	D. Lustig	Y. Lamai	G. Uchovsky	Rank	Points	Rank	Points
01	Azerbaijan	3	2	5	1	10	2	10	6	5
02	Iceland	16	18	14	4	4	11		17	
03	Albania	4	17	13	3	16	7	4	13	
04	Belgium	8	12	6	11	7	13		9	2
05	Czech Republic	5	16	8	8	6	8	3	1	12
06	Lithuania	14	3	16	5	17	9	2	15	
07	Israel									
08	Belarus	17	14	15	17	18	18		12	
09	Estonia	9	13	18	9	11	16		4	7
10	Bulgaria	13	4	10	16	8	14		8	3
11	Macedonia	18	5	3	18	14	10	1	18	
12	Croatia	10	1	4	14	12	5	6	16	
13	Austria	1	9	1	13	1	1	12	3	8
14	Greece	15	10	17	15	13	17		11	
15	Finland	2	6	7	10	3	4	7	5	6
16	Armenia	12	7	9	6	2	6	5	14	
17	Switzerland	11	11	2	2	5	3	8	10	1
18	Ireland	6	15	11	12	15	15		7	4
19	Cyprus	7	8	12	7	9	12		2	10

Detailed voting results from Israel (final)
Draw	Country	Jury							Televote	
Draw	Country	Eliko	D. Lustig	Y. Lamai	G. Uchovsky	H. Uzan	Rank	Points	Rank	Points
01	Ukraine	22	7	12	23	13	20		4	7
02	Spain	14	21	18	24	16	25		19	
03	Slovenia	16	1	17	9	9	7	4	18	
04	Lithuania	15	20	9	22	12	22		21	
05	Austria	25	2	2	2	2	1	12	10	1
06	Estonia	18	19	3	21	15	13		3	8
07	Norway	10	11	6	20	17	16		11	
08	Portugal	19	9	23	7	18	18		25	
09	United Kingdom	8	3	16	11	1	3	8	13	
10	Serbia	9	18	20	19	4	12		23	
11	Germany	6	14	1	17	7	6	5	8	3
12	Albania	21	16	11	18	19	24		22	
13	France	13	13	19	12	21	23		5	6
14	Czech Republic	11	12	8	10	14	15		1	12
15	Denmark	5	22	24	6	8	9	2	7	4
16	Australia	7	10	5	5	3	4	7	16	
17	Finland	4	5	10	3	10	5	6	12	
18	Bulgaria	12	4	14	8	20	10	1	17	
19	Moldova	3	23	13	25	25	14		2	10
20	Sweden	1	6	15	1	23	2	10	24	
21	Hungary	2	24	25	4	22	8	3	15	
22	Israel									
23	Netherlands	24	17	21	16	5	19		20	
24	Ireland	20	8	4	13	24	11		14	
25	Cyprus	17	15	7	15	11	17		9	2
26	Italy	23	25	22	14	6	21		6	5
