= Israel in the Eurovision Song Contest 2017 =

- Eurovision Song Contest 2017
- Participating broadcaster: Israel Broadcasting Authority (IBA)
- Country: Israel
- Selection process: Artist: HaKokhav HaBa L'Eirovizion; Song: Internal selection
- Selection date: Artist: 13 February 2017; Song: 13 March 2017

Competing entry
- Song: "I Feel Alive"
- Artist: Imri
- Songwriters: Dolev Ram; Penn Hazut

Placement
- Semi-final result: Qualified (3rd, 207 points)
- Final result: 23rd, 39 points

Participation chronology

Israel was represented at the Eurovision Song Contest 2017 with the song "I Feel Alive", written by Dolev Ram and Penn Hazut, and performed by Imri. The Israeli participating broadcaster, Israel Broadcasting Authority (IBA), collaborated with the commercial broadcaster Keshet and Tedy Productions to organise the reality singing competition HaKokhav HaBa L'Eirovizion ("The Next Star for Eurovision") to select the singer. Subsequently, a committee of the broadcaster internally selected for him the song, which was presented to the public on 13 March 2017.

Israel was drawn to compete in the second semi-final of the Eurovision Song Contest which took place on 11 May 2017. Performing as the closing entry during the show in position 18, "I Feel Alive" was announced among the top 10 entries of the second semi-final and therefore qualified to compete in the final on 13 May.

== Background ==
Prior to the 2017 contest, the Israel Broadcasting Authority (IBA) had participated in the Eurovision Song Contest representing Israel thirty-nine times since its first entry in 1973. It has won the contest on three occasions: in 1978 with the song "A-Ba-Ni-Bi" performed by Izhar Cohen and the Alphabeta, in 1979 with the song "Hallelujah" performed by Milk and Honey, and in 1998 with the song "Diva" performed by Dana International. Since the introduction of semi-finals to the format of the Eurovision Song Contest in 2004, Israel has, to this point, managed to qualify to the final six times, including three top ten results in 2005 with "Hasheket Shenish'ar" performed by Shiri Maimon placing fourth, in 2008 with "The Fire in Your Eyes" by Boaz placing ninth, and in 2015 with "Golden Boy" by Nadav Guedj placing ninth. Israel had failed to qualify to the final for four consecutive years between 2011 and 2014 prior to their qualification in 2015. In 2016, "Made of Stars" by Hovi Star ended 14th out of 26 entries in the final.

IBA selected its representative for the contest through the reality singing competition HaKokhav HaBa L'Eirovizion ("The Next Star for Eurovision"), which was organised by Keshet and Tedy Productions. This was the fourth time that the Israeli entry would be selected through a collaboration with Keshet and Tedy Productions.

== Before Eurovision ==
=== HaKokhav HaBa L'Eirovizion ===
The singer who would perform the Israeli entry for the Eurovision Song Contest 2017 was selected through the reality singing competition HaKokhav HaBa L'Eirovizion ("The Next Star for Eurovision"), the original version of the international format Rising Star produced by Tedy Productions and Keshet Media Group. HaKokhav HaBa was used in 2015 and 2016 to select the Israeli artist for Eurovision. The shows were hosted by Assi Azar and Rotem Sela and featured a judging panel composed of Asaf Amdursky, Keren Peles, Harel Skaat (who represented Israel in 2010) and Static & Ben-El Tavori. The competition consisted of ten shows, which commenced on 1 January and concluded on 13 February 2017. All shows in the competition were broadcast on Channel 2 as well as online via mako.co.il.

In the audition phase of the competition, performers were required to achieve 70% of the votes during their performance in order to advance; each member of the judging panel could boost a performer's score by 10%. The judging panel then selected the top eight from all of the performers that advanced from the audition phase. The top eight then competed in four duels of two performers each. The winners of the duels qualified directly for the next show and the remaining four contestants competed in two duels in the second round. The winners of the duels in the second round advanced to the next show. The remaining six performers then competed in three duels where the three duel winners entered the final, while the remaining three contestants participated in the second round. Out of the three performers in the second round the best scoring participant qualified for the final. The four finalists were: Beatbox Element, Diana Golbi, Imri Ziv and Julieta. Imri Ziv was a backing singer for Israel in 2015 and 2016.

==== Shows ====
Auditions 1–2 – 2–3 January 2017
Draw	Artist	Song	Judges' Vote				Score	Result
Draw	Artist	Song	A. Amdursky	K. Peles	H. Skaat	Static & B. El Tavori	Score	Result
1	Imri Ziv	"The Edge of Glory"					93%	Advanced
2	Beatbox Element	"Bang Bang"					91%	Advanced
3	Lee Sabach	"Zemer Shlosh Hatshuvot"					79%	Advanced
4	Daniel	"Euphoria"					28%	Eliminated
5	Ta-La-Te	"Shikorim Meahava"					75%	Advanced
6	Diana Golbi	"Alive"					95%	Advanced
7	Halli Lewis	"Me Too"					87%	Advanced
8	Gala Kfoih	"Creep"					41%	Eliminated
9	Judy Layne	"My Way"					81%	Advanced
10	Sapir Nahon	"Sheva Ba'erev"					88%	Advanced
11	Lihi Griner	"The Climb"					58%	Eliminated
12	Osher Biton	"Lehishtagea"	N/A				77%	Advanced

Audition 3 – 9 January 2017
Draw	Artist	Song	Judges' Vote				Score	Result
Draw	Artist	Song	A. Amdursky	K. Peles	H. Skaat	Static & B. El Tavori	Score	Result
1	Julieta	"Listen"					72%	Advanced
2	Yosef Gal	"Boreach Mehakol"					91%	Advanced
3	Shahar Tovok	"Yoav"					62%	Eliminated
4	Yona Shavin	"Runnin' (Lose It All)"					79%	Advanced
5	Amqa Band	N/A					28%	Eliminated
6	Helen Kalandadze	"All About That Bass"					90%	Advanced
7	Yonit Zaidenberg	"Hachnisini Tachat Knafech"					85%	Advanced

Auditions 4–5 – 16 and 24 January 2017
Draw	Artist	Song	Judges' Vote				Score	Result
Draw	Artist	Song	A. Amdursky	K. Peles	H. Skaat	Static & B. El Tavori	Score	Result
1	Ron Buchbut	"Yarok Udvash"		N/A			82%	Advanced
2	Elayev Family	"Leyli Jon"					77%	Advanced
3	Aviv Losev	"Besof Kol Yom"					56%	Eliminated
4	Beta Zinq	"Dancing Shoes"	N/A				77%	Advanced
5	Hamotagim	"Liran Khultsa Afor"					14%	Eliminated
6	Michal Shapira (Note: Michal Shapira, who qualified from the audition, announced later that she would withdraw from the competition.)	"Chandelier"					76%	Withdrew
7	Chen Maximov	"Leshem"					84%	Advanced
8	Nika	"Out Here on My Own"					49%	Eliminated
9	Noy Eisen & Chen Zimmerman	Mashup (Note: The two singers performed a mashup of these songs: Watch Me (Whip/Nae Nae), How Deep Is Your Love, We Don't Talk Anymore, Cold Water and Let Me Love You)					80%	Advanced
10	Eliad Malki	"You Are the Only One"				N/A	27%	Eliminated
11	David Vanesyan	"Rise Like a Phoenix"					85%	Advanced

Results of the further auditions
Artist
Beatbox Element	Elayev Family	Julieta	Sapir Nahon
Beta Zinq	Halli Lewis	Lee Sabach	Ta-La-Te
Chen Maximov	Helen Kalandadze	Noy Eisen & Chen Zimmerman	Yona Shavin
David Vanesyan	Imri Ziv	Osher Biton	Yonit Zaidenberg
Diana Golbi	Judy Layne	Ron Buchbut	Yosef Gal

Quarter-finals 1–2 – First Round – 30–31 January 2017
Duel	Draw	Artist	Song	Judges' Vote				Score	Result
Duel	Draw	Artist	Song	A. Amdursky	K. Peles	H. Skaat	Static & B. El Tavori	Score	Result
I	1	Julieta	"Lama Li" / "Papi"					87%	Advanced
I	2	Sapir Nahon	"Yekirati"					79%	Second Round
II	3	Imri Ziv	"Rude Boy"					72%	Advanced
II	4	Beatbox Element	"Can't Hold Us"					49%	Second Round
III	5	Halli Lewis	"Cheap Thrills"					58%	Second Round
III	6	Ta-La-Te	"Mashke Yakar"					69%	Advanced
IV	7	Yona Shavin	"Blurred Lines"					38%	Second Round
IV	8	Diana Golbi	"My Immortal"					83%	Advanced

Quarter-finals 1–2 – Second Round
Duel	Draw	Artist	Song	Judges' Vote				Score	Result
Duel	Draw	Artist	Song	A. Amdursky	K. Peles	H. Skaat	Static & B. El Tavori	Score	Result
I	1	Yona Shavin	"Wake Me Up"					85%	Eliminated
I	2	Sapir Nahon	"Geshem"					87%	Advanced
II	3	Halli Lewis	"Love Yourself"					52%	Eliminated
II	4	Beatbox Element	"In a Manner of Speaking"					56%	Advanced

Semi-final – First Round – 6 February 2017
Duel	Draw	Artist	Song	Judges' Vote				Score	Result
Duel	Draw	Artist	Song	A. Amdursky	K. Peles	H. Skaat	Static & B. El Tavori	Score	Result
I	1	Imri Ziv	"I Don't Want to Miss a Thing"					95%	Advanced
I	2	Sapir Nahon	"Benadik"					73%	Second Round
II	3	Beatbox Element	"Heathens"					83%	Advanced
II	4	Julieta	"Ve'im Preda"					76%	Second Round
III	5	Ta-La-Te	"Simane Hazman"					59%	Second Round
III	6	Diana Golbi	"Feeling Good"					87%	Advanced

Semi-final – Second Round
Duel	Draw	Artist	Song	Judges' Vote				Score	Result
Duel	Draw	Artist	Song	A. Amdursky	K. Peles	H. Skaat	Static & B. El Tavori	Score	Result
IV	1	Julieta	"Hata'am Hayashan"					85%	Advanced
IV	2	Ta-La-Te	"Mahapecha Shel Simcha"					26%	Eliminated
IV	3	Sapir Nahon	"Birkat Hamelech"					75%	Eliminated

===== Final =====
In the second round of the final the votes of the jury were symbolical, the winner was decided solely by the viewers who voted via the mobile application.

Final – First Round – 13 February 2017
Duel	Draw	Artist	Song	Judges' Vote				Score	Result
Duel	Draw	Artist	Song	A. Amdursky	K. Peles	H. Skaat	Static & B. El Tavori	Score	Result
I	1	Imri Ziv	"Halo"					78%	Second Round
I	2	Beatbox Element	"Hey Mama"					55%	Eliminated
II	3	Julieta	"My Number One"					53%	Saved
II	4	Diana Golbi	"Euphoria"					84%	Second Round

Final – Second Round
Duel	Draw	Artist	Song	Judges' Vote				Score	Place
Duel	Draw	Artist	Song	A. Amdursky	K. Peles	H. Skaat	Static & B. El Tavori	Score	Place
III	1	Julieta	"Shikorim Meahava"					58%	3
III	2	Imri Ziv	"Because of You"					74%	1
III	3	Diana Golbi	"Purple Rain"					67%	2

=== Promotion ===
Imri Ziv made several appearances across Europe to specifically promote "I Feel Alive" as the Israeli Eurovision entry. Between 3 and 6 April, Ziv took part in promotional activities in Tel Aviv where he performed during the Israel Calling event held at the Ha'teatron venue. On 8 April, Imri Ziv performed during the Eurovision in Concert event which was held at the Melkweg venue in Amsterdam, Netherlands and hosted by Cornald Maas and Selma Björnsdóttir. On 15 April, he performed during the Eurovision Spain Pre-Party, which was held at the Sala La Riviera venue in Madrid, Spain.

The music video of the song released ahead of the contest made reference to Ziv's previous experiences at Eurovision, when he performed as a backing singer for Nadav Guedj in 2015 and to Hovi Star in 2016.

== At Eurovision ==
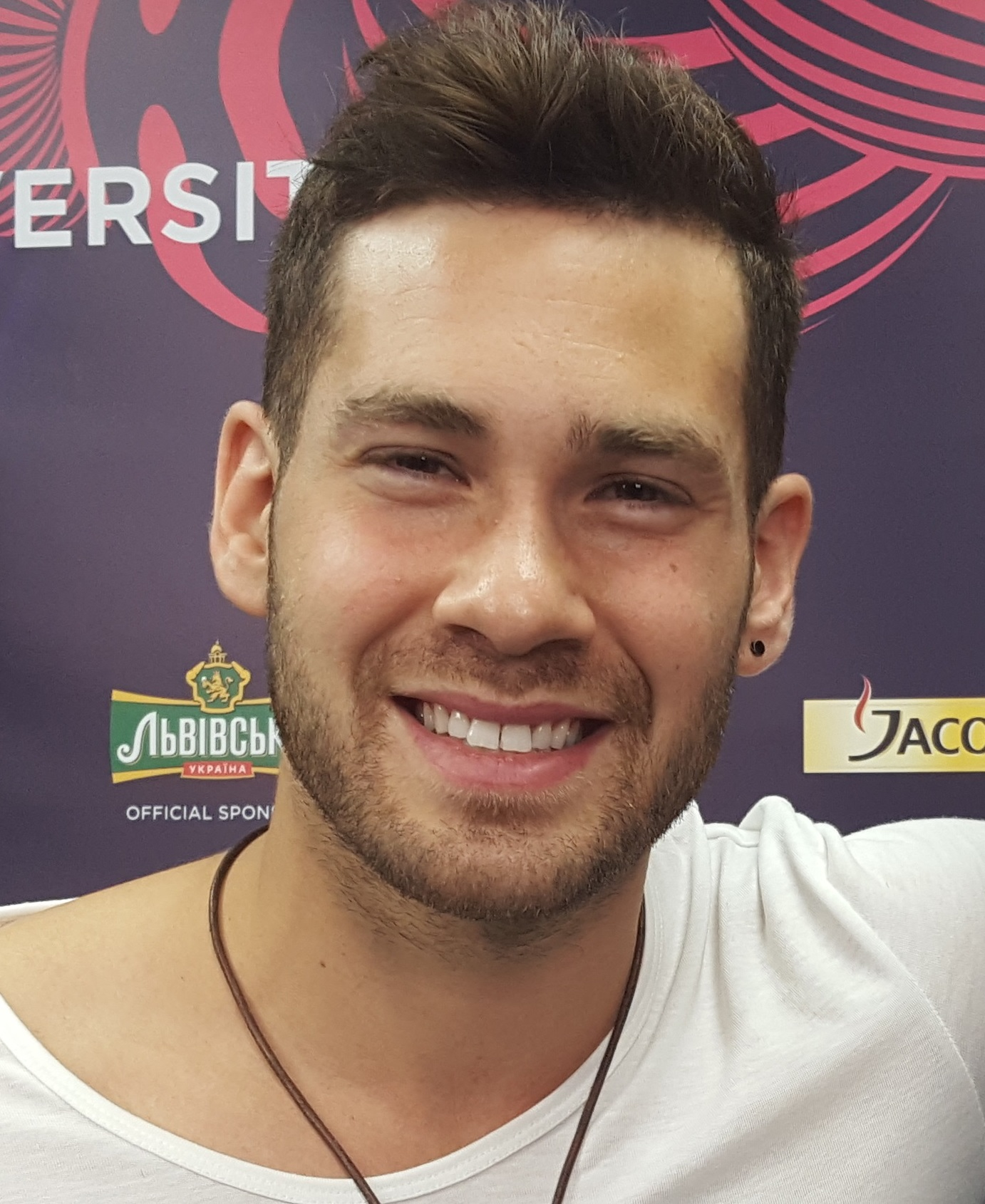
Imri Ziv during a press meet and greet

According to Eurovision rules, all nations with the exceptions of the host country and the "Big Five" (France, Germany, Italy, Spain and the United Kingdom) are required to qualify from one of two semi-finals in order to compete for the final; the top ten countries from each semi-final progress to the final. The European Broadcasting Union (EBU) split up the competing countries into six different pots based on voting patterns from previous contests, with countries with favourable voting histories put into the same pot. On 31 January 2017, a special allocation draw was held which placed each country into one of the two semi-finals, as well as which half of the show they would perform in. Israel was placed into the second semi-final, to be held on 11 May 2017, and was scheduled to perform in the second half of the show.

Once all the competing songs for the 2017 contest had been released, the running order for the semi-finals was decided by the shows' producers rather than through another draw, so that similar songs were not placed next to each other. Originally, Israel was set to perform in position 19, closing the show and following Estonia. However, following Russia's withdrawal from the contest on 13 April and subsequent removal from the running order of the second semi-final, Israel's performing position shifted to 18.

=== Semi-final ===
Imri Ziv took part in technical rehearsals on 3 April and 6 May, followed by dress rehearsals on 10 and 11 May. This included the jury show on 10 May where the professional juries of each country watched and voted on the competing entries.

The Israeli performance featured Imri Ziv dressed in a black sleeveless T-shirt and black trousers. A flashing white light backstage took up the whole video wall, while Imri stood to sing the first verse. White circles were projected on the LED screens during the chorus. The backing singers were all dressed in black. Imri was joined by two dancers dressed in white. There were flashing red and blue lights pulsating in the background. In addition to that, Imri's image was projected on the video wall. As the song neared its end, flashing orange lights flashed in the background.

At the end of the show, Israel was announced as having finished in the top 10 and subsequently qualifying for the grand final. It was later revealed that Israel placed third in the semi-final, receiving a total of 207 points: 132 points from the televoting and 75 points from the juries.

=== Final ===
Shortly after the second semi-final, a winners' press conference was held for the ten qualifying countries. As part of this press conference, the qualifying artists took part in a draw to determine which half of the grand final they would subsequently participate in. This draw was done in the reverse order the countries appeared in the semi-final running order. Israel was drawn to compete in the first half. Following this draw, the shows' producers decided upon the running order of the final, as they had done for the semi-finals. Israel was set to open the show and perform in position 1, before the entry from Poland.

Imri Ziv once again took part in dress rehearsals on 12 and 13 May before the final, including the jury final where the professional juries cast their final votes before the live show. Imri Ziv performed a repeat of his semi-final performance during the final on 13 May, and finished in 23rd place with 39 points: 5 points from the televoting and 34 points from the juries.

IBA appointed Ofer Nachshon as its spokesperson to announce the Israeli jury votes in the final. As he did, he informed that the Israeli broadcaster would be shutting down momentarily, therefore ending Israeli participation in the Eurovision Song Contest. The final of the contest was actually IBA's last television production and broadcast before its closure. On 15 May 2017, the Monday after the final, the Israeli Public Broadcasting Corporation (IPBC/Kan) was launched and replaced IBA as the Israeli public broadcaster. On 6 July 2017, the EBU and IPBC announced an agreement that allowed the new corporation to participate in EBU events while its membership application to the union was reviewed and awaiting approval. Thanks to this agreement, IPBC was allowed to participate in the 2018 contest, which won, without having yet become a full member of the EBU.

=== Voting ===
==== Points awarded to Israel ====
Points awarded to Israel (Semi-final 2)
Score	Televote	Jury
12 points		France
10 points	Bulgaria; France; Malta	Bulgaria; Malta
8 points	Germany; Hungary	
7 points	Belarus; Macedonia; Netherlands; Norway; Romania; San Marino; Ukraine	Norway; Serbia
6 points	Denmark	Ireland
5 points	Austria; Croatia; Serbia; Switzerland	Denmark; Netherlands
4 points	Estonia; Ireland	Romania; Switzerland
3 points	Lithuania	Croatia
2 points		
1 point		Hungary; Ukraine

Points awarded to Israel (Final)
Score	Televote	Jury
12 points		
10 points		
8 points		Bulgaria
7 points		Malta
6 points		France
5 points		Norway
4 points		Azerbaijan
3 points	France	
2 points		Romania
1 point	Azerbaijan; Macedonia	Belarus; Serbia

==== Points awarded by Israel ====
Points awarded by Israel (Semi-final 2)
Score	Televote	Jury
12 points	Bulgaria	Hungary
10 points	Romania	Norway
8 points	Belarus	Austria
7 points	Hungary	Estonia
6 points	Estonia	Bulgaria
5 points	Macedonia	Belarus
4 points	Netherlands	Denmark
3 points	Austria	Romania
2 points	Switzerland	Malta
1 point	Ireland	Switzerland

Points awarded by Israel (Final)
Score	Televote	Jury
12 points	Portugal	Portugal
10 points	Bulgaria	Sweden
8 points	Italy	Belgium
7 points	Romania	Bulgaria
6 points	Belgium	France
5 points	Moldova	Norway
4 points	France	Ukraine
3 points	Sweden	Moldova
2 points	Belarus	Italy
1 point	Hungary	Belarus

==== Detailed voting results ====
The following members comprised the Israeli jury:

- Tal Sondak (jury chairperson) – singer, represented Israel in 2001
- Noy Alooshe – musician, journalist
- Kobi Oshrat – composer, conductor; composed and conducted the 1979, 1985, and 1992 Israeli entries; conducted the 1987 and 1991 Israeli entries
- Ronit Rolland – musician, songwriter
- Meytal Shevach – journalist, radio host

Detailed voting results from Israel (Semi-final 2)
Draw	Country	Jury							Televote	
Draw	Country	T. Sondak	N. Alooshe	K. Oshrat	R. Rolland	M. Shevach	Rank	Points	Rank	Points
01	Serbia	12	4	17	9	13	13		16	
02	Austria	2	7	5	2	7	3	8	8	3
03	Macedonia	13	5	16	14	9	14		6	5
04	Malta	8	12	12	10	6	9	2	15	
05	Romania	5	16	4	8	14	8	3	2	10
06	Netherlands	11	13	11	6	12	12		7	4
07	Hungary	1	3	2	1	1	1	12	4	7
08	Denmark	6	6	9	7	15	7	4	12	
09	Ireland	10	11	8	13	10	11		10	1
10	San Marino	17	17	13	17	17	17		14	
11	Croatia	16	10	15	15	16	16		11	
12	Norway	4	1	1	12	2	2	10	13	
13	Switzerland	14	2	10	11	11	10	1	9	2
14	Belarus	9	9	6	5	5	6	5	3	8
15	Bulgaria	3	15	7	4	4	5	6	1	12
16	Lithuania	15	8	14	16	8	15		17	
17	Estonia	7	14	3	3	3	4	7	5	6
18	Israel									

Detailed voting results from Israel (Final)
Draw	Country	Jury							Televote	
Draw	Country	T. Sondak	N. Alooshe	K. Oshrat	R. Rolland	M. Shevach	Rank	Points	Rank	Points
01	Israel									
02	Poland	23	22	20	9	20	19		23	
03	Belarus	11	9	12	11	6	10	1	9	2
04	Austria	16	12	11	6	17	13		15	
05	Armenia	18	13	17	10	13	15		11	
06	Netherlands	22	14	19	15	22	18		14	
07	Moldova	6	6	8	18	10	8	3	6	5
08	Hungary	20	15	16	7	4	12		10	1
09	Italy	3	17	14	3	11	9	2	3	8
10	Denmark	13	16	10	16	19	16		20	
11	Portugal	1	3	1	1	1	1	12	1	12
12	Azerbaijan	12	10	6	17	12	11		19	
13	Croatia	25	18	18	25	25	24		12	
14	Australia	10	11	15	13	14	14		21	
15	Greece	21	19	22	24	18	22		22	
16	Spain	17	25	23	20	23	23		25	
17	Norway	8	2	5	19	3	6	5	16	
18	United Kingdom	24	23	21	21	24	25		18	
19	Cyprus	19	20	24	23	15	20		13	
20	Romania	15	21	7	14	21	17		4	7
21	Germany	14	24	25	22	16	21		24	
22	Ukraine	9	7	13	5	5	7	4	17	
23	Belgium	2	4	9	12	2	3	8	5	6
24	Sweden	4	1	2	2	9	2	10	8	3
25	Bulgaria	5	8	4	4	8	4	7	2	10
26	France	7	5	3	8	7	5	6	7	4
