= Israel in the Eurovision Song Contest 2016 =

- Eurovision Song Contest 2016
- Country: Israel
- Selection process: HaKokhav HaBa L'Eirovizion
- Selection date: 3 March 2016

Competing entry
- Song: "Made of Stars"
- Artist: Hovi Star
- Songwriters: Doron Medalie

Placement
- Semi-final result: Qualified (7th, 147 points)
- Final result: 14th, 135 points

Participation chronology

Israel was represented at the Eurovision Song Contest 2016 with the song "Made of Stars", written by Doron Medalie and performed by Hovi Star. The Israeli broadcaster Israel Broadcasting Authority (IBA) collaborated with the commercial broadcaster Keshet in order to select the Israeli entry for the 2016 contest in Stockholm, Sweden. The reality singing competition HaKokhav HaBa L'Eirovizion ("The Next Star for Eurovision"), which was organised by Keshet and Tedy Productions, was used to select the Israeli entry. The fifteen show competition concluded with a final on 3 March 2016 that featured four performers who were matched with potential Eurovision songs. "Made of Stars" performed by Hovi Star emerged as the winner following a public vote.

Israel was drawn to compete in the second semi-final of the Eurovision Song Contest which took place on 12 May 2016. Performing during the show in position 4, "Made of Stars" was announced among the top 10 entries of the second semi-final and therefore qualified to compete in the final on 14 May. It was later revealed that Israel placed seventh out of the 18 participating countries in the semi-final with 147 points. In the final, Israel performed in position 7 and placed fourteenth out of the 26 participating countries, scoring 135 points.

== Background ==
Prior to the 2016 contest, Israel had participated in the Eurovision Song Contest thirty-eight times since its first entry in 1973. Israel has won the contest on three occasions: in 1978 with the song "A-Ba-Ni-Bi" performed by Izhar Cohen and the Alphabeta, in 1979 with the song "Hallelujah" performed by Milk and Honey, and in 1998 with the song "Diva" performed by Dana International. Since the introduction of semi-finals to the format of the Eurovision Song Contest in 2004, Israel has, to this point, managed to qualify to the final six times, including three top ten results in 2005 with Shiri Maimon and "HaSheket SheNish'ar" placing fourth, in 2008 with Boaz and "The Fire in Your Eyes" placing ninth, and in 2015 with Nadav Guedj and "Golden Boy" placing ninth. Israel had failed to qualify to the final for four consecutive years between 2011 and 2014 prior to their qualification in 2015.

The Israeli national broadcaster, Israel Broadcasting Authority (IBA) had been in charge of the nation's participation in the contest since its debut in 1973 until 2015. While IBA confirmed Israel's participation in the contest on 21 September 2015 and formalised a collaboration with Keshet and Tedy Productions in order to select the Israeli entry for 2016, IBA will shut down in 2016 and will be replaced by the Israeli Broadcasting Corporation (IBC), which will take over responsibilities related to the Eurovision Song Contest. This was the third time that the Israeli entry would be selected through a collaboration with Keshet and Tedy Productions; IBA collaborated with these entities in order to select the Israeli entry in 2008 and 2015.

== Before Eurovision ==
=== HaKokhav HaBa L'Eirovizion ===
The Israeli entry for the Eurovision Song Contest 2016 was selected through the reality singing competition HaKokhav HaBa L'Eirovizion ("The Next Star for Eurovision"), the original version of the international format Rising Star produced by Tedy Productions and Keshet Media Group. HaKokhav HaBa was used in 2015 to select the Israeli artist for Eurovision, but for 2016, the competition was renamed to specifically refer to the Eurovision Song Contest and selected both the artist and song for the event. The shows were hosted by Assi Azar and Rotem Sela and featured a judging panel composed of Assaf Etedgi, Muki, Keren Peles and Harel Skaat (2010 Israeli Eurovision entrant). The competition consisted of fifteen shows, which commenced on 5 December 2015 and concluded on 3 March 2016. All shows in the competition were broadcast on Channel 2 as well as online via mako.co.il.

In the audition phase of the competition, performers were required to achieve 70% of the votes during their performance in order to advance; each member of the judging panel could boost a performer's score by 10%. The judging panel then selected the top sixteen from all of the performers that advanced from the audition phase. The top sixteen then competed in eight duels of two performers each, which resulted in the elimination of seven performers. The nine remaining acts were then divided into groups of three where the top two in each group advanced. The remaining six performers then faced another round of duels where three performers were eliminated, while the three duel winners entered the final. One of the three eliminated performers in the last set of duels was awarded a second chance based on an additional vote. The four finalists were: Ella Daniel, Hovi Star, Nofar Salman and Gil Hadash.

==== Competing entries ====
For the final performance, the four performers were matched with a potential Eurovision Song Contest song chosen from over 100 submissions by a professional committee with members from IBA, Keshet and the Israeli Broadcasting Corporation. Prior to the final, the songs were presented during the Reshet Gimmel radio programme Ba'avir on 1 March 2016. One of them, Made Of Stars (in both of its versions, ethnic/oriental for Nofar and pop ballad for Hovi), has been written by the same composer behind last year's Israeli entry "Golden Boy", Doron Medalie.

Competing entries
| Artist | Song | Composer(s) |
|---|---|---|
| Ella Daniel | "Somebody Out There" | David Maman, Philip Halloun |
| Gil Hadash | "Follow the Sun" | Stav Beger, Tom Gefen |
| Hovi Star | "Made of Stars" | Doron Medalie |
| Nofar Salman | "Made of Stars" | Doron Medalie |

==== Final ====
The final took place on 3 March 2016 at the G.G. Studios in Neve Ilan, Jerusalem. The winner was selected in two rounds. In the first round the four performers competed in duels and each performed a cover song. The two duel winners advanced to the second round based on a public vote as well as votes from each member of the judging panel who had the option of boosting the performer's score by 3%. The two duel winners were Hovi Star and Nofar Salman. The judging panel alone selected a third performer from the two that did not win their duels to enter the second round; Ella Daniel was the judging panel's choice. In the second round, the three performers that advanced from the first round presented their candidate Eurovision entries and the winner, "Made of Stars" performed by Hovi Star, was selected solely by a public vote. The public vote that took place in both rounds was conducted entirely through a mobile application.

Qualifier from the two duels Saved contestant

Final – First Round – 3 March 2016
| Duel | Draw | Artist | Song (Original artist) | Public | Result |
|---|---|---|---|---|---|
| I | 1 | Ella Daniel | "Happy" (Pharrell Williams) | 67% | Advanced |
| I | 2 | Hovi Star | "Stay with Me" (Sam Smith) | 79% | Advanced |
| II | 1 | Gil Hadash | "The Show Must Go On" (Queen) | 49% | Eliminated |
| II | 2 | Nofar Salman | "Mangina" (Eden Ben Zaken) | 76% | Advanced |

Final – Second Round – 3 March 2016
| Draw | Artist | Song | Public | Place |
|---|---|---|---|---|
| 1 | Hovi Star | "Made of Stars" | 68% | 1 |
| 2 | Ella Daniel | "Somebody Out There" | 58% | 3 |
| 3 | Nofar Salman | "Made of Stars" | 67% | 2 |

=== Preparation ===
Following Hovi Star's victory during the final of HaKokhav HaBa L'Eirovizion, Israeli newspaper Israel Hayom reported on 6 March 2016 that special meetings were held between Hovi Star and Tedy Productions to discuss the possibility of changing his song for the Eurovision Song Contest as a result of negative feedback. Hovi Star recorded a version of Ella Daniel's song "Somebody Out There", which was considered as a possible replacement. On 7 March, it was announced that "Made of Stars" would remain the Israeli entry for the contest, however, the song would be reworked to better suit Hovi Star. The final version of the song, arranged and produced by Chen Metzger Eder, and the official music video, which was filmed in Tel Aviv and directed by Elad Weissman and Yoav Tsafir, were released to the public on 13 March.

=== Promotion ===
Hovi Star made several appearances across Europe to specifically promote "Made of Stars" as the Israeli Eurovision entry. On 2 April, Hovi Star performed during the Eurovision PreParty Riga, which was organised by OGAE Latvia and held at the Spikeri Concert Hall in Riga, Latvia. On 3 April, he performed during the Eurovision Pre-Party, which was held at the Izvestia Hall in Moscow, Russia and hosted by Dmitry Guberniev. On 9 April, Hovi Star performed during the Eurovision in Concert event which was held at the Melkweg venue in Amsterdam, Netherlands and hosted by Cornald Maas and Hera Björk. Between 22 and 23 April, Hovi Star completed promotional activities in Malta by appearing during the TVM talk show programme Xarabank and performing during the Malta Eurovision Party at the Aria Complex in San Ġwann.

In addition to his international appearances, Hovi Star took part in promotional activities in Tel Aviv and performed during the Israel Calling event held at the Ha'teatron venue between 11 and 13 April.

==== Harassment incident in Russia ====
During Hovi Star's promotional appearance in Russia on 3 April, the singer was reportedly harassed by passport control officers in Moscow who ridiculed Star's appearance and destroyed his passport. The incident attracted media interest two weeks following its occurrence after it was first exposed during an interview by the 2016 Spanish Eurovision entrant Barei, who described the details she witnessed at the airport. Hovi Star stated that he didn't discuss the incident because he preferred not to attract negative stories to himself. During his appearance on the Maltese talk show Xarabank on 22 April, Hovi Star commented: "In Moscow, people have a rough time with people like me, maybe because I'm gay, maybe because I dress like this, maybe because I wear make-up, I don't know. They told me I couldn't go in, they looked at my passport, they ripped my passport, and then they laughed at me." Star was eventually allowed to enter Russia where he was issued a new passport by the Israeli embassy in Moscow.

== At Eurovision ==
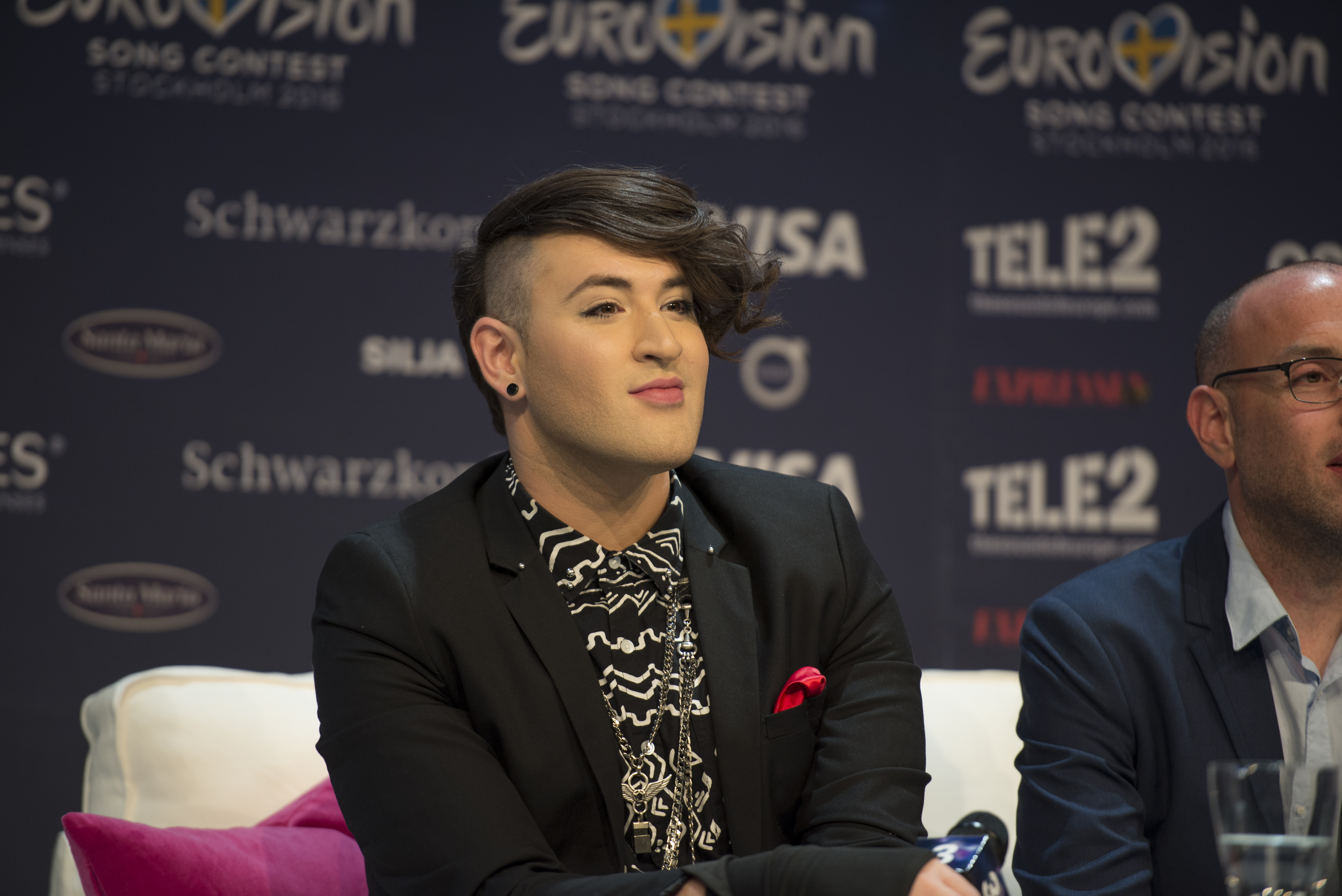
Hovi Star during a press meet and greet

According to Eurovision rules, all nations with the exceptions of the host country and the "Big Five" (France, Germany, Italy, Spain and the United Kingdom) are required to qualify from one of two semi-finals in order to compete for the final; the top ten countries from each semi-final progress to the final. The European Broadcasting Union (EBU) split up the competing countries into six different pots based on voting patterns from previous contests, with countries with favourable voting histories put into the same pot. On 25 January 2016, a special allocation draw was held which placed each country into one of the two semi-finals, as well as which half of the show they would perform in. The EBU's Reference Group approved a request by the Israeli broadcaster for Israel to compete in the second semi-final on 12 May 2016 due to the date of the first semi-final, 10 May 2016, coinciding with the Yom Hazikaron memorial day. During the allocation draw, it was determined that Israel would perform in the first half of the second semi-final.

Once all the competing songs for the 2016 contest had been released, the running order for the semi-finals was decided by the shows' producers rather than through another draw, so that similar songs were not placed next to each other. Israel was set to perform in position 4, following the entry from Switzerland and before the entry from Belarus.

In Israel, the second semi-final and final was televised live on Channel 1 with Hebrew subtitles and Channel 33 with Arabic subtitles; due to the Yom Hazikaron memorial day coinciding with the date of the first semi-final, the first semi-final aired on Channel 1 prior to the final on 14 May. The second semi-final and final were also broadcast via radio in Hebrew on 88 FM with commentary by Kobi Menora, Or Vaxman and Nancy Brandes The Israeli spokesperson, who announced the top 12-point score awarded by the Israeli jury during the final, was Ofer Nachshon.

=== Semi-final ===
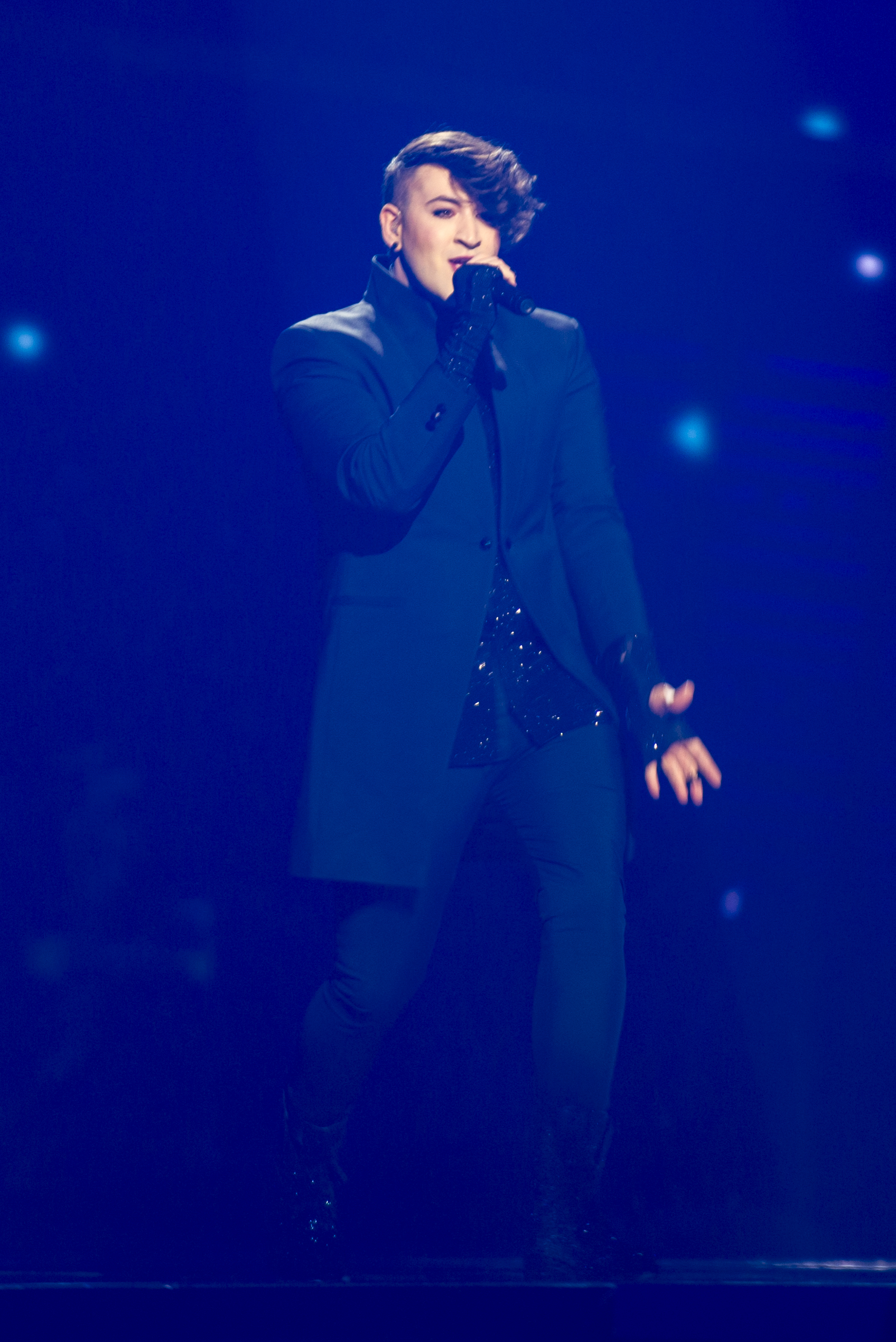
Hovi Star during a rehearsal before the second semi-final

Hovi Star took part in technical rehearsals on 4 and 7 May, followed by dress rehearsals on 11 and 12 May. This included the jury show on 11 May where the professional juries of each country watched and voted on the competing entries.

The Israeli performance featured Hovi Star performing in a black outfit covered in Swarovski crystals with two acrobats performing on giant hoops. The stage was predominately dark with the LED screens displaying stars and a pyrotechnic waterfall effect featured at the end of the performance. The two acrobats performing on stage with Hovi Star were Amir Ner-Goan and Jennifer Cohen. Hovi Star was also joined by three backing vocalists: Imri Ziv (Who would represent Israel at the Eurovision Song Contest 2017), Almog Kapach and Matan Agami.

At the end of the show, Israel was announced as having finished in the top 10 and subsequently qualifying for the grand final. It was later revealed that Israel placed seventh in the semi-final, receiving a total of 147 points: 20 points from the televoting and 127 points from the juries.

=== Final ===
Shortly after the second semi-final, a winners' press conference was held for the ten qualifying countries. As part of this press conference, the qualifying artists took part in a draw to determine which half of the grand final they would subsequently participate in. This draw was done in the reverse order the countries appeared in the semi-final running order. Israel was drawn to compete in the first half. Following this draw, the shows' producers decided upon the running order of the final, as they had done for the semi-finals. Israel was subsequently placed to perform in position 7, following the entry from Italy and before the entry from Bulgaria.

Hovi Star once again took part in dress rehearsals on 13 and 14 May before the final, including the jury final where the professional juries cast their final votes before the live show. Hovi Star performed a repeat of his semi-final performance during the final on 14 May. Israel placed fourteenth in the final, scoring 135 points: 11 points from the televoting and 124 points from the juries.

=== Voting ===
Voting during the three shows was conducted under a new system that involved each country now awarding two sets of points from 1–8, 10 and 12: one from their professional jury and the other from televoting. Each nation's jury consisted of five music industry professionals who are citizens of the country they represent, with their names published before the contest to ensure transparency. This jury judged each entry based on: vocal capacity; the stage performance; the song's composition and originality; and the overall impression by the act. In addition, no member of a national jury was permitted to be related in any way to any of the competing acts in such a way that they cannot vote impartially and independently. The individual rankings of each jury member as well as the nation's televoting results were released shortly after the grand final.

Below is a breakdown of points awarded to Israel and awarded by Israel in the second semi-final and grand final of the contest, and the breakdown of the jury voting and televoting conducted during the two shows:

==== Points awarded to Israel ====
Points awarded to Israel (Semi-final 2)
| Score | Televote | Jury |
|---|---|---|
| 12 points | | Germany |
| 10 points | | Australia; Belgium; Switzerland |
| 8 points | | Italy; Poland |
| 7 points | | Ireland; Serbia; Ukraine |
| 6 points | Australia | Georgia; Lithuania; Macedonia |
| 5 points | | Bulgaria; Denmark; Norway |
| 4 points | | Albania; Slovenia; United Kingdom |
| 3 points | | |
| 2 points | Bulgaria; Germany; Ireland; Ukraine; United Kingdom | Latvia |
| 1 point | Belarus; Belgium; Georgia; Norway | Belarus |

Points awarded to Israel (Final)
| Score | Televote | Jury |
|---|---|---|
| 12 points | | Germany |
| 10 points | | Australia |
| 8 points | | Italy; Switzerland |
| 7 points | | Croatia; Finland; Netherlands; Poland; Serbia |
| 6 points | Azerbaijan | Lithuania; Ukraine |
| 5 points | | Cyprus; Macedonia |
| 4 points | | Ireland |
| 3 points | France | Albania; Azerbaijan; Georgia; Norway; United Kingdom |
| 2 points | Bulgaria | Belgium; Denmark; Latvia; Slovenia |
| 1 point | | Malta; Spain |

==== Points awarded by Israel ====
Points awarded by Israel (Semi-final 2)
| Score | Televote | Jury |
|---|---|---|
| 12 points | Australia | Australia |
| 10 points | Bulgaria | Ukraine |
| 8 points | Belgium | Macedonia |
| 7 points | Ukraine | Latvia |
| 6 points | Poland | Belgium |
| 5 points | Lithuania | Georgia |
| 4 points | Denmark | Lithuania |
| 3 points | Belarus | Bulgaria |
| 2 points | Macedonia | Ireland |
| 1 point | Ireland | Switzerland |

Points awarded by Israel (Final)
| Score | Televote | Jury |
|---|---|---|
| 12 points | France | Ukraine |
| 10 points | Russia | Australia |
| 8 points | Ukraine | France |
| 7 points | Bulgaria | Bulgaria |
| 6 points | Armenia | Belgium |
| 5 points | Australia | Latvia |
| 4 points | Poland | Spain |
| 3 points | Austria | Croatia |
| 2 points | Azerbaijan | Armenia |
| 1 point | Belgium | Lithuania |

==== Detailed voting results ====
The following members comprised the Israeli jury:

- Betty Pablo (jury chairperson) – singer, songwriter, musician, actress
- Rhone Rabin – advertising and marketing
- Nathan Slor – musician
- Chaya Zel – Head of Record and Film Library, Kol Israel IBA Radio
- Tsach Zimroni – DJ, party promoter

Detailed voting results from Israel (Semi-final 2)
| Draw | Country | Jury | | | | | | | Televote | |
| Draw | Country | B. Pablo | R. Rabin | N. Slor | C. Zel | T. Zimroni | Rank | Points | Rank | Points |
|---|---|---|---|---|---|---|---|---|---|---|
| 01 | Latvia | 8 | 3 | 2 | 10 | 5 | 4 | 7 | 11 | |
| 02 | Poland | 11 | 11 | 11 | 16 | 16 | 14 | | 5 | 6 |
| 03 | Switzerland | 9 | 8 | 12 | 14 | 8 | 10 | 1 | 16 | |
| 04 | Israel | | | | | | | | | |
| 05 | Belarus | 4 | 14 | 13 | 12 | 17 | 13 | | 8 | 3 |
| 06 | Serbia | 15 | 13 | 17 | 13 | 11 | 15 | | 13 | |
| 07 | Ireland | 6 | 15 | 14 | 2 | 6 | 9 | 2 | 10 | 1 |
| 08 | Macedonia | 1 | 1 | 6 | 5 | 12 | 3 | 8 | 9 | 2 |
| 09 | Lithuania | 12 | 5 | 7 | 3 | 9 | 7 | 4 | 6 | 5 |
| 10 | Australia | 3 | 4 | 1 | 1 | 2 | 1 | 12 | 1 | 12 |
| 11 | Slovenia | 16 | 9 | 16 | 9 | 7 | 11 | | 15 | |
| 12 | Bulgaria | 7 | 6 | 5 | 7 | 14 | 8 | 3 | 2 | 10 |
| 13 | Denmark | 17 | 17 | 10 | 15 | 10 | 16 | | 7 | 4 |
| 14 | Ukraine | 2 | 2 | 4 | 4 | 3 | 2 | 10 | 4 | 7 |
| 15 | Norway | 14 | 16 | 9 | 6 | 15 | 12 | | 12 | |
| 16 | Georgia | 5 | 7 | 8 | 11 | 4 | 6 | 5 | 14 | |
| 17 | Albania | 13 | 12 | 15 | 17 | 13 | 17 | | 17 | |
| 18 | Belgium | 10 | 10 | 3 | 8 | 1 | 5 | 6 | 3 | 8 |

Detailed voting results from Israel (Final)
| Draw | Country | Jury | | | | | | | Televote | |
| Draw | Country | B. Pablo | R. Rabin | N. Slor | C. Zel | T. Zimroni | Rank | Points | Rank | Points |
|---|---|---|---|---|---|---|---|---|---|---|
| 01 | Belgium | 12 | 6 | 2 | 9 | 1 | 5 | 6 | 10 | 1 |
| 02 | Czech Republic | 19 | 14 | 13 | 10 | 18 | 15 | | 24 | |
| 03 | Netherlands | 16 | 17 | 22 | 20 | 25 | 24 | | 19 | |
| 04 | Azerbaijan | 11 | 16 | 9 | 25 | 10 | 14 | | 9 | 2 |
| 05 | Hungary | 21 | 22 | 24 | 12 | 9 | 18 | | 15 | |
| 06 | Italy | 10 | 8 | 25 | 6 | 11 | 11 | | 13 | |
| 07 | Israel | | | | | | | | | |
| 08 | Bulgaria | 7 | 5 | 7 | 5 | 6 | 4 | 7 | 4 | 7 |
| 09 | Sweden | 14 | 24 | 21 | 22 | 19 | 23 | | 17 | |
| 10 | Germany | 15 | 15 | 19 | 21 | 22 | 19 | | 22 | |
| 11 | France | 4 | 9 | 3 | 3 | 3 | 3 | 8 | 1 | 12 |
| 12 | Poland | 8 | 23 | 12 | 15 | 21 | 16 | | 7 | 4 |
| 13 | Australia | 3 | 4 | 1 | 1 | 8 | 2 | 10 | 6 | 5 |
| 14 | Cyprus | 25 | 19 | 23 | 23 | 17 | 25 | | 12 | |
| 15 | Serbia | 23 | 18 | 16 | 24 | 12 | 21 | | 21 | |
| 16 | Lithuania | 18 | 7 | 11 | 4 | 16 | 10 | 1 | 11 | |
| 17 | Croatia | 2 | 21 | 15 | 8 | 7 | 8 | 3 | 23 | |
| 18 | Russia | 5 | 20 | 17 | 7 | 20 | 13 | | 2 | 10 |
| 19 | Spain | 6 | 12 | 8 | 14 | 13 | 7 | 4 | 14 | |
| 20 | Latvia | 9 | 3 | 4 | 11 | 4 | 6 | 5 | 16 | |
| 21 | Ukraine | 1 | 1 | 5 | 2 | 2 | 1 | 12 | 3 | 8 |
| 22 | Malta | 20 | 13 | 14 | 13 | 24 | 17 | | 25 | |
| 23 | Georgia | 22 | 10 | 10 | 16 | 5 | 12 | | 20 | |
| 24 | Austria | 24 | 11 | 20 | 17 | 23 | 22 | | 8 | 3 |
| 25 | United Kingdom | 17 | 25 | 18 | 18 | 14 | 20 | | 18 | |
| 26 | Armenia | 13 | 2 | 6 | 19 | 15 | 9 | 2 | 5 | 6 |
