= Imri Ziv =

Israeli singer (born 1991)

Imri Ziv אימרי זיו
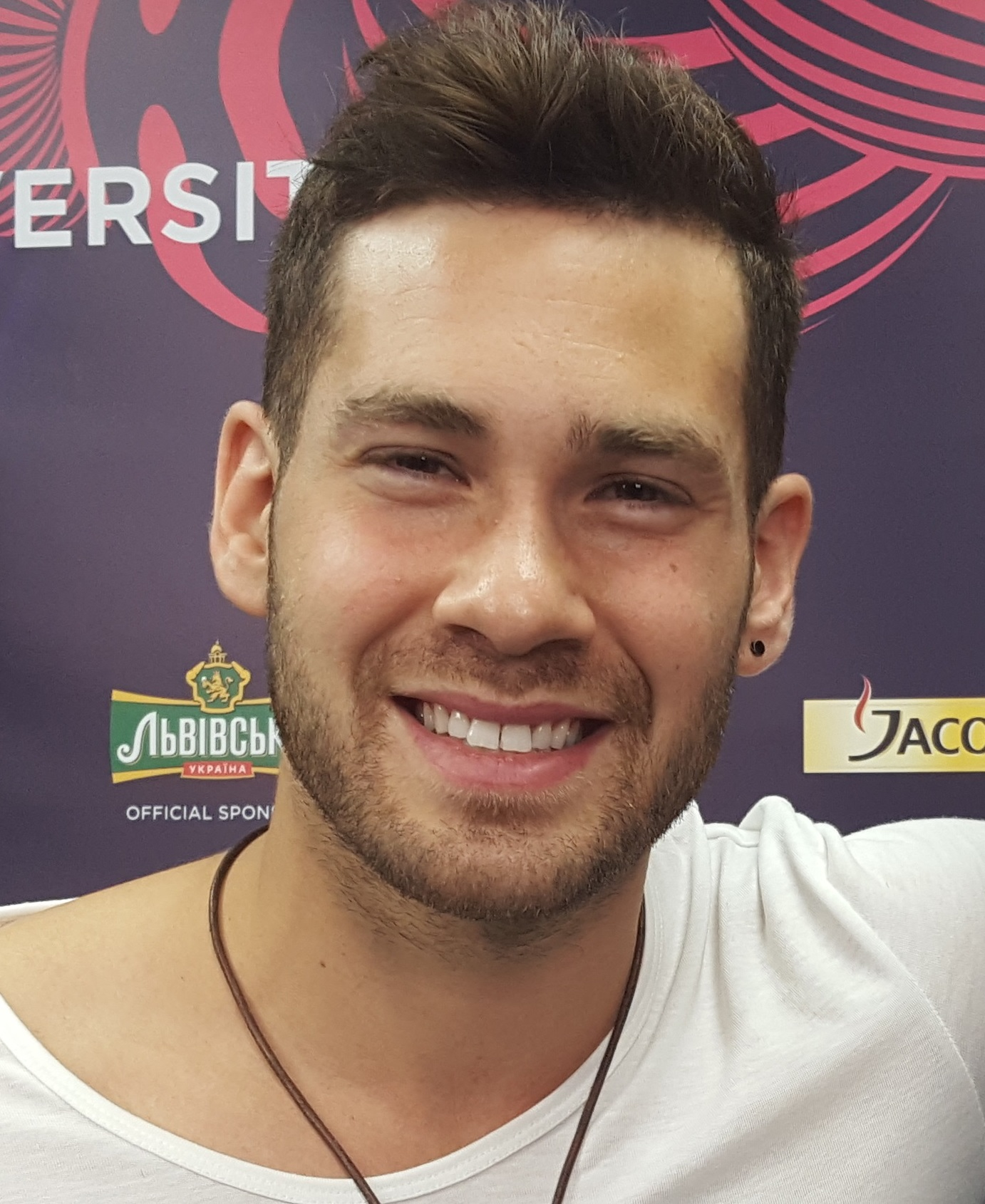
- Imri Ziv in 2017

Background information
- Also known as: Imri
- Born: 12 September 1991 (age 35); Hod HaSharon, Israel
- Genre: Pop
- Occupations: Singer; actor; voice actor
- Years active: 2009–present

Imri Ziv (Hebrew: אִימְרִי זִיו, [imˈʁi ˈziv]; born 12 September 1991), known mononymously as Imri (stylised in all caps), is an Israeli singer, actor and voice actor. After winning HaKokhav HaBa, he represented Israel in the Eurovision Song Contest 2017 in Kyiv with the song "I Feel Alive", finishing in 23rd place in the final. He has since performed in musical theatre in Israel and France.

== Life and career ==
=== Life and education ===
Born in Hod HaSharon Israel, on 12 September 1991, to a family of Ashkenazi Jewish (Romanian-Jewish, Polish-Jewish, Austrian-Jewish, and Ukrainian-Jewish) descent. Ziv studied at Ilan Ramon High School. While doing his obligatory military service, he performed in a band of the Education and Youth Corps of the Israel Defense Forces. For university, he studied a degree in communication sciences at the Interdisciplinary Center Herzliya (now Reichman University).

Ziv says that since he was a child he has had a talent for easily learning languages. He speaks fluent Spanish with an Argentinian accent, as his Spanish teacher was from Buenos Aires. In June 2023, Ziv came out as gay in an interview with Israel Hayom.

=== 2012–2016: The Voice Israel and early career ===
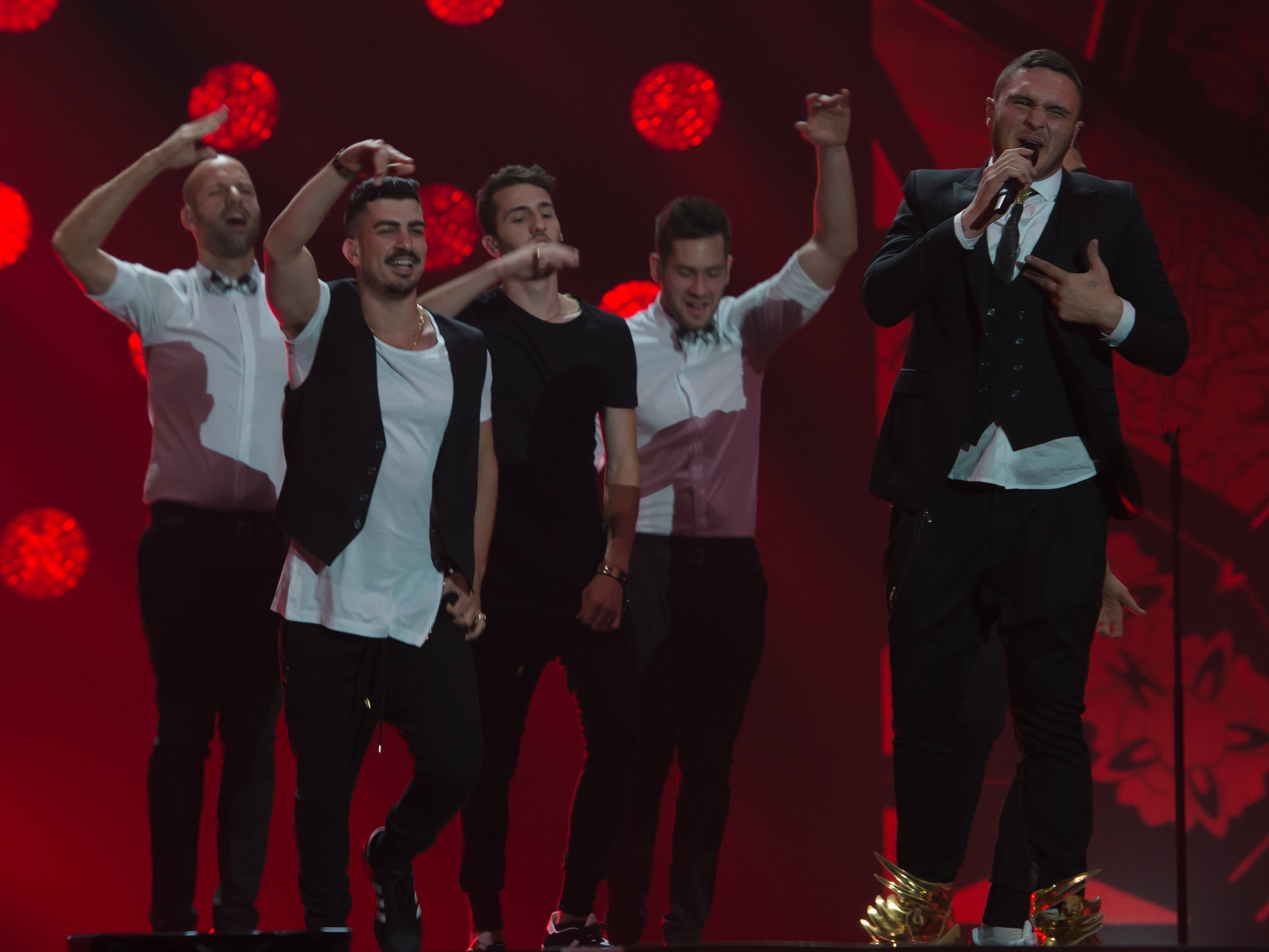
Ziv is the first on right, behind Nadav Guedj during the 2015 Eurovision contest

In 2012, he auditioned for the first season of The Voice Israel, singing "אהובתי"; two of the four judges, Sarit Hadad and Rami Kleinstein, turned their chairs. He joined Kleinstein's team and was eliminated in the Battle Rounds, where he sang "פרפרים" against teammate Orit Shalom.

Ziv performed as a backing vocalist in Israel's Eurovision Song Contest 2015 and 2016 entries, respectively with Nadav Guedj singing "Golden Boy" and Hovi Star singing "Made of Stars" with both qualifying for the final.

In 2016, he provided a Hebrew voice for the animated film Trolls.

=== 2017: HaKokhav HaBa and Eurovision Song Contest ===
He participated in season 4 of HaKokhav HaBa L'Eurovizion, the reality singing competition "The Next Star for Eurovision", being the Israeli format of Rising Star. In the auditions on 2 and 3 January 2017, he performed "The Edge of Glory" by Lady Gaga, obtained 93% of the public vote and the approval of all judges Keren Peles, Harel Skaat (2010 Israeli Eurovision entrant) and duo Static & Ben-El Tavori.

In the quarter-finals held on 30 and 31 January 2017, he performed "Rude Boy" by Rihanna earning 72% and approval from three judges and in the semi-final "I Don't Want to Miss a Thing" by Aerosmith earning 95% and approval of all judges and qualifying for the finals.

In the final on 13 February 2017, he first performed "Halo" by Beyoncé, winning 78% of the public's votes and approval of all four judges. He followed it up with an interpretation of "Because of You" by Kelly Clarkson winning the contest with 74% approval rating. Diana Golbi finished second with 67% and Julieta third with 58%.

After winning HaKokhav HaBa L'Eurovizion, Ziv represented Israel at the Eurovision Song Contest 2017. His song, "I Feel Alive", written by Dolev Ram and Penn Hazut was released on 9 March 2017, placing third in the second semi-final and 23rd in the final.

=== Theatre and later career ===
After Eurovision, Ziv joined Habima Theatre's 2017 production of Les Misérables as an alternate in the role of Marius, and appeared in the children's musical Motek HaTroll HaKasum. In 2018 he finished fourth in the first season of Ninja Israel VIP. He has also voiced characters in several animated films.

In January 2026, Ziv was cast in the lead role of Samuel in Le Sel et le Miel ("Salt and Honey"), a French-language musical written and directed by Bernard Bitton, which follows Jewish history from the Holocaust to the founding of Israel. The production was scheduled to open at the Folies Bergère in Paris in March 2026.

== Discography ==
=== Singles ===
Title	Year	Peak chart positions	Album
Title	Year	ISR	Album
"I Feel Alive"	2017	6	Non-album single
"Imrico"	2019		Non-album single

== See also ==
- Music of Israel

Awards and achievements
Preceded by Hovi Star	HaKokhav HaBa winner 2017	Succeeded by Netta
Preceded by Hovi Star with "Made of Stars"	Israel in the Eurovision Song Contest; 2017	Succeeded by Netta with "Toy"
