= I Feel Alive =

2017 song by Imri Ziv

Single by Imri Ziv
- Released: 10 March 2017
- Recorded: 2017
- Genre: Dance-pop; Europop; progressive house
- Length: 3:00
- Label: Unicell
- Songwriter(s): Dolev Ram; Penn Hazut
- Producer(s): Doli & Penn

Imri Ziv singles chronology
"I Feel Alive" (2017)	"Imrico" (2019)

Music video
- "I Feel Alive" on YouTube

Eurovision Song Contest 2017 entry
- Country: Israel
- Artist(s): Imri Ziv
- Language: English
- Composer(s): Dolev Ram; Penn Hazut
- Lyricist(s): Dolev Ram; Penn Hazut

Finals performance
- Semi-final result: 3rd
- Semi-final points: 207
- Final result: 23rd
- Final points: 39

Entry chronology
- ◄ "Made of Stars" (2016)
- "Toy" (2018) ►

"I Feel Alive" is a song performed by Israeli singer Imri Ziv. The song represented Israel in the Eurovision Song Contest 2017. It was written by Dolev Ram and Penn Hazut. The song was released as a digital download on 10 March 2017 by Unicell.

== Eurovision Song Contest ==
Israel began their national final for the Eurovision Song Contest 2017, HaKokhav HaBa L'Eurovizion 2017, on 2 January 2017. The show lasted several weeks, and ended on 13 February 2017, with Ziv receiving the highest scores from the public and being declared the winner. As the winner, he won the right to represent Israel in the Eurovision Song Contest 2017, and began working on producing his Eurovision entry. On 26 February, it was revealed that his song would be called "I Feel Alive". The song was released on 9 March. Israel competed in the second half of the second semi-final at the Eurovision Song Contest.

The music video makes reference to Eurovision Song Contest 2015, when Ziv was a backup singer for Nadav Guedj in 2015 Eurovision Song Contest and to Hovi Star in the following 2016 Eurovision Song Contest.

== Track listing ==
Digital download
No.	Title	Length
1.	"I Feel Alive" (אירוויזיון 2017)	3:00

DJ PM & Tomer Maizner Remix
No.	Title	Length
1.	"I Feel Alive (DJ PM & Tomer Maizner Remix)"	4:38

== Charts ==
Chart (2017)	Peak position
Israel (Media Forest)	6
Sweden Heatseeker (Sverigetopplistan)	18

== Release history ==
Date	Format	Label
10 March 2017	Digital download	Unicell Advanced Cellular Solutions
