= Jump (Nadav Guedj song) =

2015 single by Nadav Guedj

Single by Nadav Guedj

from the album Nadav Guedj
- Released: 1 December 2015
- Recorded: 2014/15
- Genre: Pop
- Length: 3:20
- Label: Unicell
- Songwriter(s): Roby Fayer; Nadav Guedj

Nadav Guedj singles chronology
"Good Vibes" (2015)	"Jump" (2015)	"Make You Mine" (2016)

"Jump" is a song by French-Israeli singer Nadav Guedj. It was released on 1 December 2015 through Unicell as the third single from his debut studio album, Nadav Guedj (2016).

== Track listing ==
Digital download
No.	Title	Length
1.	"Jump"	3:20

== Chart performance ==
=== Weekly charts ===
Chart (2015)	Peak position
Israel (Media Forest)	3

== Release history ==
Region	Date	Format	Label
Israel	1 December 2015	Digital download	Unicell
