= Good Vibes (Nadav Guedj song) =

Single by Nadav Guedj

from the album Nadav Guedj
- Released: 19 August 2015
- Recorded: 2015
- Genre: Pop
- Length: 3:13
- Label: Unicell
- Songwriter(s): Nadav Guedj; Roby Fayer

Nadav Guedj singles chronology
"Golden Boy" (2015)	"Good Vibes" (2015)	"Jump" (2015)

"Good Vibes" is a song by French-Israeli singer Nadav Guedj. It was released on 19 August 2015 through Unicell as the second single from his debut studio album, Nadav Guedj (2016).

== Track listing ==
Digital download
No.	Title	Length
1.	"Good Vibes"	3:38

== Chart performance ==
Chart (2015)	Peak position
Israel (Media Forest)	1

== Release history ==
Region	Date	Format	Label
Israel	19 August 2015	Digital download	Unicell
