= Hovi Star =

Israeli musical artist

Hovi Star חובי סטאר
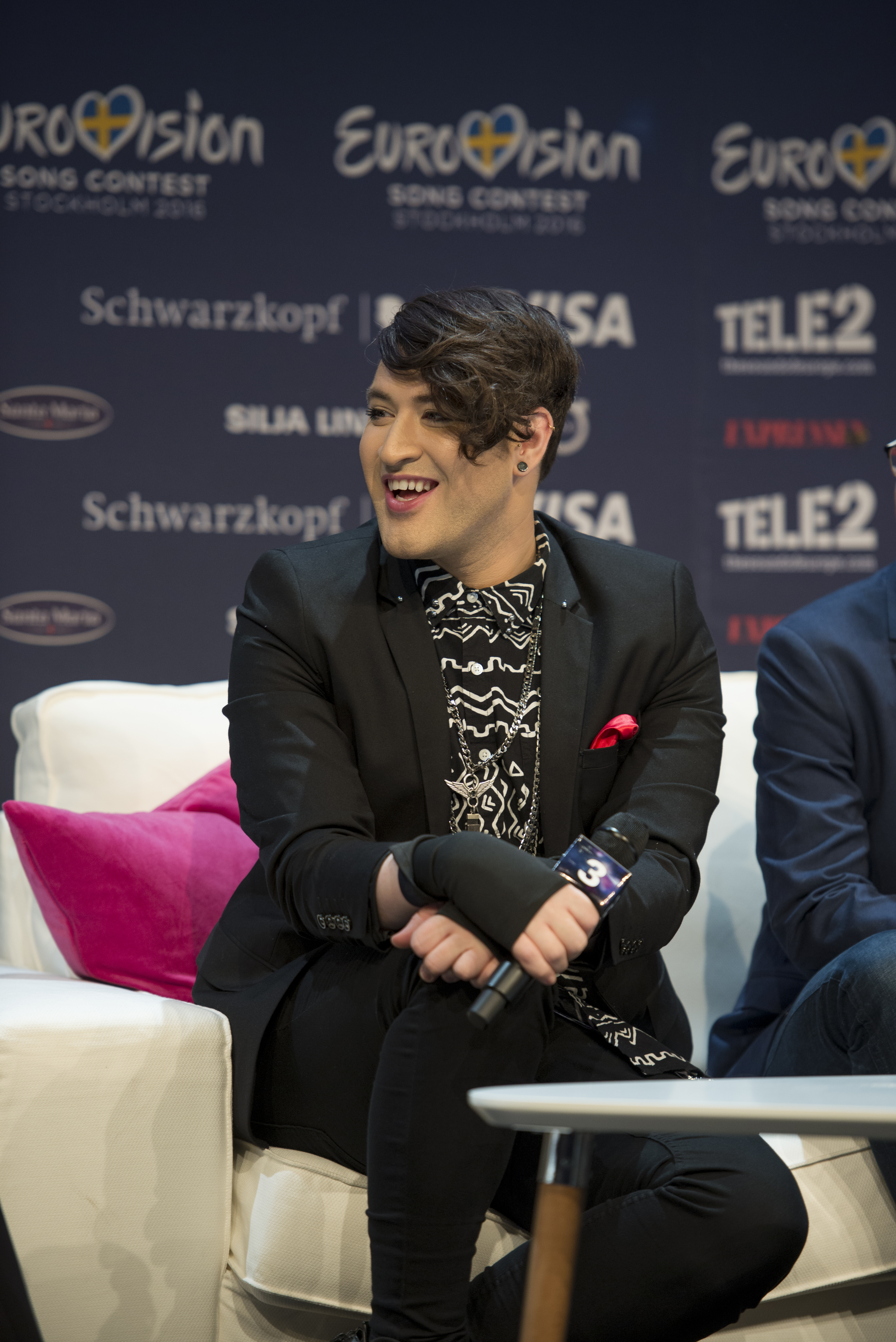
- Hovi Star in 2016

Background information
- Born: Hovav Sekulets; 19 November 1986 (age 39); Kiryat Ata, Israel
- Origin: Israel
- Genres: Pop
- Occupations: Singer, Songwriter, Composer, Voice Actor, Host
- Instrument: Vocals
- Years active: 2006-present
- Website: hovistar.com

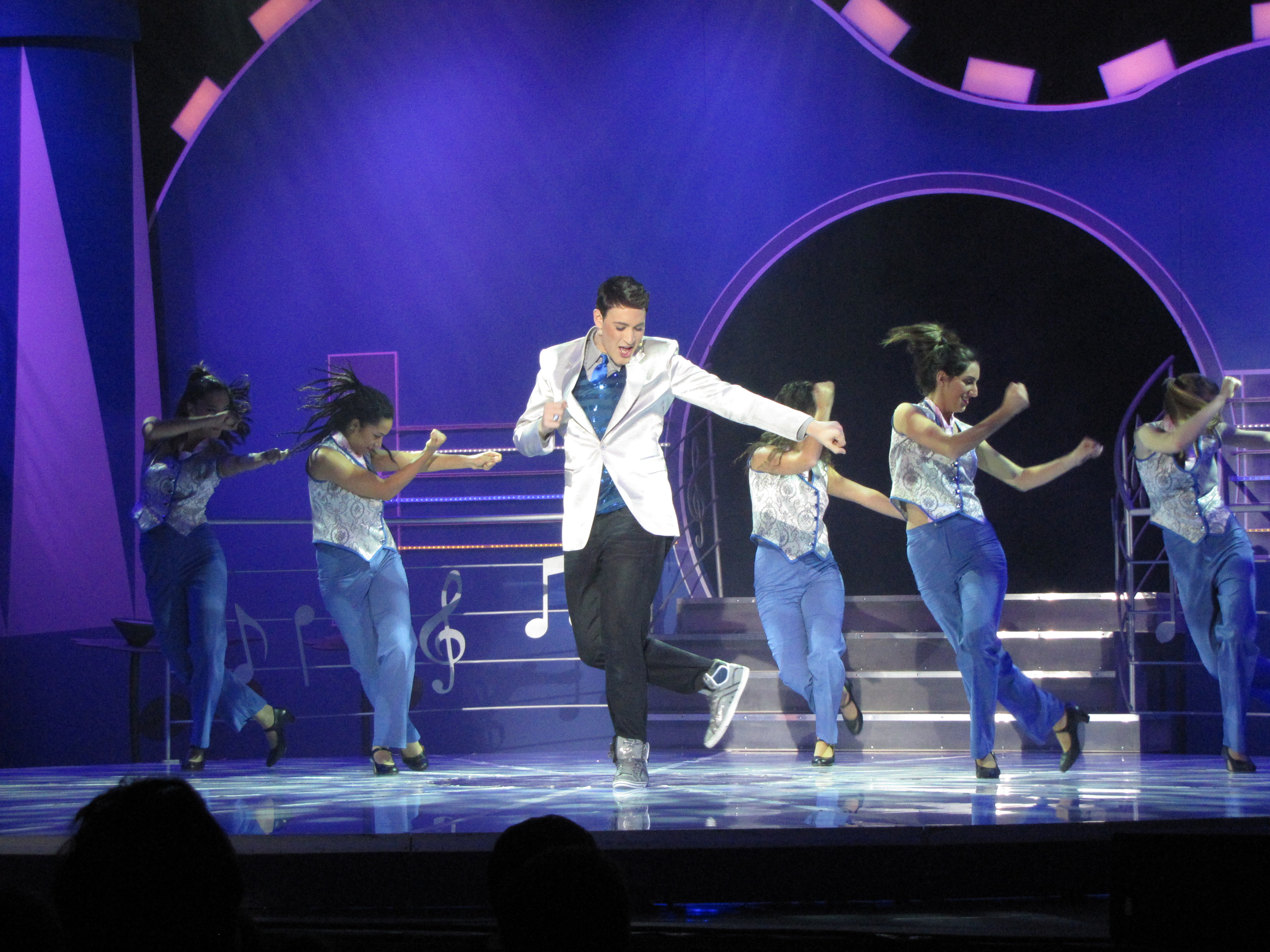
Hovi Sekulets during Kokhav Nolad (2009)

Hovav Sekulets (Hebrew: חובב סקולץ; born 19 November 1986), known by his stage name Hovi Star (Hebrew: חובי סטאר), is an Israeli singer. He represented Israel in the Eurovision Song Contest 2016 with the song "Made of Stars" by Doron Medalie.

== Biography ==
Hovav Sekulets (aka Hovi Star) was born in Kiryat-Ata. At 6, he began to audition for children's programs in Israel. During his three years of service in the Israel Defense Forces, he was a member of the IDF Band. Star is a trained hairstylist and makeup artist. He is openly gay.

In April 2016, he suffered a homophobic incident in Moscow airport while on a tour to promote his Eurovision entry. Star said Russian border police officers tore up his passport, laughed at his attire and makeup.

== Singing and media career ==
In 2009, he took part in season 7 of Kokhav Nolad, the Israeli version of Idol competition broadcast from May to August 2009 as Hovi Star, and finished seventh overall. In the same year Star also took part in the "Children's Song Festival" in Israel with his self-composed song "Little boy, big boy".

The following year he was invited back to Kokhav Nolad to present 'Star Live' - a behind-the-scenes show about the series for online platform MAKO, and also appeared as an expert guest on 'Ha Boker Shel Keshet' to comment on the participants.

During this time he continued his music career with various releases such as "Playing dangerous" and "Boyfriend" before deciding to take a break from music for a year outside of Israel. On return to his homeland, Hovi released "W.S.I.L." and began touring with music groups and solo acts all over the world for the next three years, performing in many countries worldwide. As a songwriter, Star has composed for other Israeli singers such as Liel Kolet ("Red Lines"), Or Bar ("Sorry", "Glass Doll", "One Hug Too Many"), Megior Biton ("Girls' Night") and Barak Tamam ("Live").

He has also been a voice actor in a number of Hebrew dubbed versions of film releases, including: Lego, Inside Out, Lucky Duck, Frozen Fever, My First Dragon 2, Paddington Bear, Maya the Bee, Batman, Sabrina the Teenage Witch, The Nut Job, Geronimo Stilton, CJ The DJ, among others.

In 2016, Star took part in the Israeli production of "The Little Mermaid" as the "Star of the Sea," a role written especially for him.

=== Eurovision Song Contest ===
In 2015, he took part in HaKokhav HaBa La'Eirovizion, the selection process for choosing the Israeli representative to Eurovision Song Contest winning the show's title. He represented Israel in the Eurovision Song Contest 2016 in Stockholm with the song "Made of Stars."

At Eurovision, Star performed fourth in the second semifinal on May 12 and qualified to the final in seventh place. In the Grand Final on May 14, Star performed from position #7 and finished #14 overall - seventh on the professional jury voting, receiving 12 points from Germany.

== Discography ==
=== Singles ===
==== As lead artist ====
Title	Year	Peak chart positions	
Title	Year	ISR	SWE
"משחק באש" (Playing with Fire)	2009	—	—
"בויפרנד" (Boyfriend)	2010	—	—
"Something That I Want" (with Alon Sharr)	2014	—	—
"Made of Stars"	2016	5	93
"Silver Spoon"	2019	—	—
"בשנה הבאה" (Next year)	2021	—	—

==== As featured artist ====
Title	Year	Album
"W.S.I.L" (Nimrod Gabay featuring Hovi Star)	2011	Non-album single

== See also ==
- Music of Israel

Awards and achievements
Preceded by Nadav Guedj	HaKokhav HaBa winner 2016	Succeeded by Imri
Preceded by Nadav Guedj with "Golden Boy"	Israel in the Eurovision Song Contest; 2016	Succeeded by Imri with "I Feel Alive"
