= Made of Stars =

2016 single by Hovi Star

Single by Hovi Star
- Released: 30 March 2016
- Recorded: 2016
- Genre: Symphonic pop
- Length: 3:01
- Label: Universal Music Group
- Songwriter(s): Doron Medalie
- Producer(s): Doron Medalie

Hovi Star singles chronology
"Something That I Want" (2014)	"Made of Stars" (2016)	"Silver Spoon" (2019)

Music video
- "Made of Stars" on YouTube

Eurovision Song Contest 2016 entry
- Country: Israel
- Artist(s): Hovi Star
- Language: English
- Composer(s): Doron Medalie
- Lyricist(s): Doron Medalie

Finals performance
- Semi-final result: 7th
- Semi-final points: 147
- Final result: 14th
- Final points: 135

Entry chronology
- ◄ "Golden Boy" (2015)
- "I Feel Alive" (2017) ►

"Made of Stars" is a song performed by Israeli singer Hovi Star. The song represented Israel in the Eurovision Song Contest 2016, and was written and produced by Doron Medalie. The song was released as a digital download on 30 March 2016 through Universal Music Group.

== Eurovision Song Contest ==
The Israeli entry for the Eurovision Song Contest 2016 was selected through the reality singing competition HaKokhav HaBa L'Eirovizion ("The Next Star for Eurovision"). The competition consisted of fifteen shows, which commenced on 5 December 2015 and concluded on 3 March 2016. The final took place on 3 March 2016 at the G.G. Studios in Neve Ilan, Jerusalem. The four performers were matched with a potential Eurovision Song Contest song chosen from over 100 submissions by a professional committee with members from IBA, Keshet and the Israeli Broadcasting Corporation. The winner was selected in two rounds. In the first round the four performers competed in duels and each performed a cover song. The two duel winners advanced to the second round based on a public vote as well as votes from each member of the judging panel who had the option of boosting the performer's score by 3%. Hovi performed "Stay with Me" during the first round he advanced to the second round where he performed his Eurovision song, he won with 68% of the public vote.

== Music video ==
A music video to accompany the release of "Made of Stars" was first released onto Star's YouTube channel on 13 March 2016 at a total length of three minutes and fourteen seconds.

== Track listing ==
Digital download
No.	Title	Length
1.	"Made of Stars"	3:01

== Chart performance ==
=== Weekly charts ===
Chart (2016)	Peak position
Israel (Media Forest)	5
Sweden (Sverigetopplistan)	93

== Release history ==
Region	Date	Format	Label
Worldwide	30 March 2016	Digital download	Universal Music Group

== See also ==
- Eurovision
- Eurovision Song Contest 2016
- Israel
- Israel in the Eurovision Song Contest 2016
