= Nadav Guedj =

Israeli singer and actor

Nadav Guedj נדב גדג'
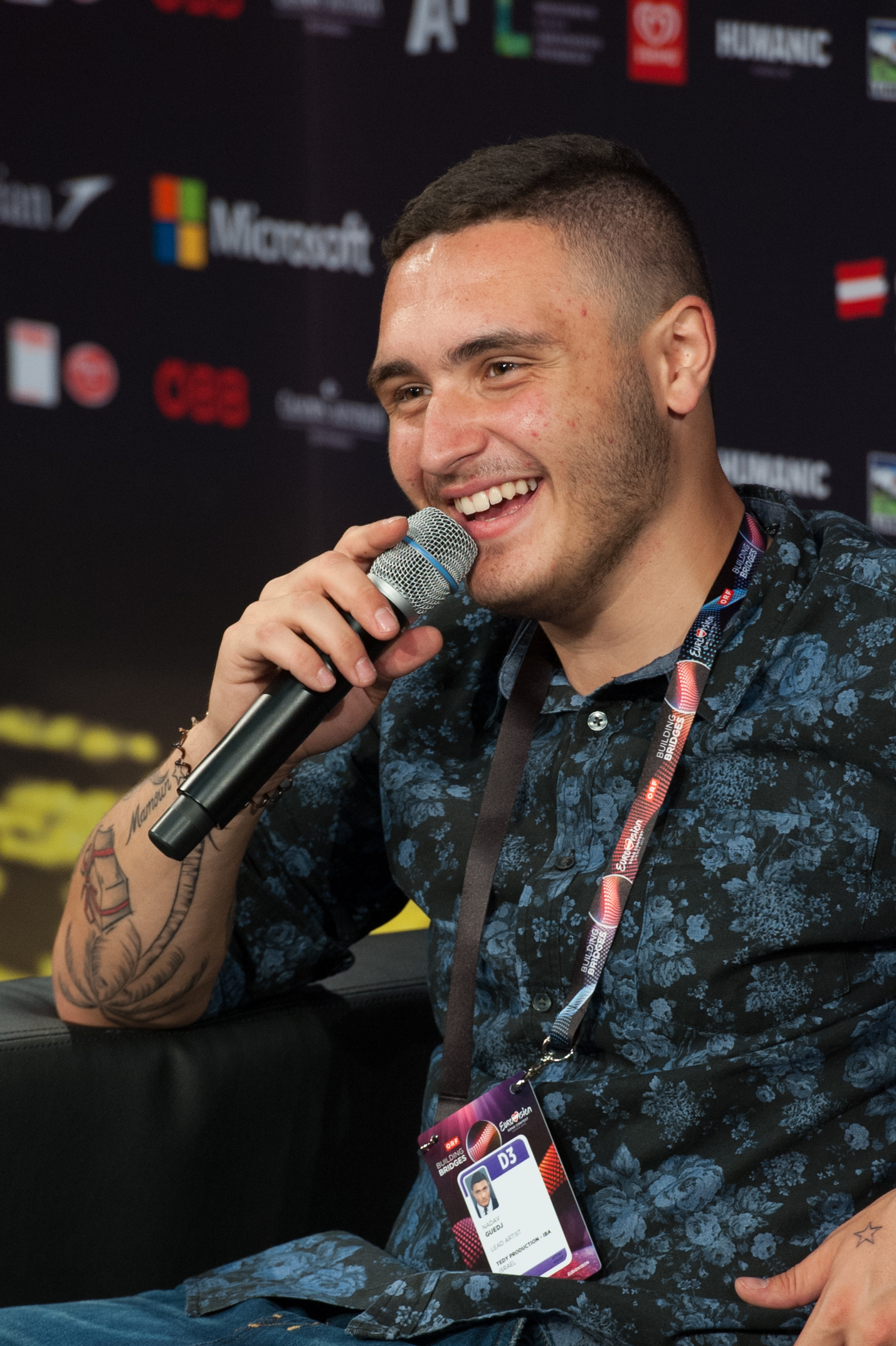
- Guedj in 2015

Background information
- Born: November 2, 1998 (age 27); Paris, France
- Origin: Netanya, Israel
- Genres: Pop, R&B, funk, dance
- Occupations: Singer; actor
- Instrument: Vocals
- Years active: 2015–present
- Labels: Tedy Productions, D-Music

Nadav Guedj (Hebrew: נדב גדג', pronounced [naˈdav gedʒ]; born 2 November 1998) is an Israeli singer and actor who represented Israel in the Eurovision Song Contest 2015, where he finished in 9th place. He is the winner of season two of HaKokhav HaBa (Israel's Rising Star). He released his debut album in 2016 and his second, and first in Hebrew, in 2026, and has also acted in Israeli film and television.

== Personal life ==
He was born to an Algerian Jewish family in Paris, then moved to Israel.

Guedj lives in Netanya. He did his military service in an Israel Defense Forces band.

== Musical career ==
=== 2014: HaKokhav HaBa ===
Guedj entered the second season of HaKokhav HaBa, Israel's national selection for the Eurovision Song Contest 2015, and became one of its sixteen finalists. He was the youngest participant of the season, having just turned sixteen when he attended the first audition day. He sang "Russian Roulette" by Rihanna for his first audition and Stevie Wonder's "Lately" for the second audition.

In the second round of the contest proper, Guedj performed "Halo" by Beyoncé. He advanced to the semi-finals of the contest along with six other contestants where he performed "Mirrors" by Justin Timberlake. He then reached the finals of the contest with four other contestants after performing "Locked Out of Heaven" by Bruno Mars in a duets battle against fellow contestant Orit Biansay. Guedj then won HaKokhav HaBa with his performance of Beyoncé's "Halo" on 17 February 2015.

=== 2015–16: Eurovision Song Contest and debut album ===
With his win on HaKokhav HaBa, Guedj qualified to become Israel's entrant to the Eurovision Song Contest 2015. On 26 February 2015, it was announced that he would sing "Golden Boy", written by Doron Medalie, at Eurovision.

"Golden Boy" was released on 12 March 2015; it was Israel's first entry in the contest to be sung entirely in English.

On 21 May 2015, Guedj performed in the second semi-final in Vienna, qualifying Israel for the final for the first time in five years. In the final on 23 May, he finished 9th with 97 points. The contest's postcards – short video clips introducing the participants – followed the slogan "Building Bridges": each began with the contestant receiving an invitation to Austria in their home country, then travelling to one of Austria's nine states to complete an individual task.

Guedj's postcard was filmed on location in Tel Aviv and the ski resort of Lech am Arlberg in Vorarlberg, where Guedj is seen spray painting a gondola lift with the Austrian cartoon artist and musician Bernd Püribauer.

After the contest, on 8 August 2015, Guedj released a music video for "Summer Together", a Coca-Cola-sponsored song also written by Medalie for the company's summer events in Israel. On 19 August 2015, he released the single "Good Vibes", which he co-wrote with Ruby Feier. On 1 December 2015, he released the single "Jump". On 2 March 2016 he released the single "Make You Mine". On 15 May 2016 he released the single "Hold the City". He released his self-titled debut studio album in 2016.

=== 2017–present: Hebrew music and second album ===
On 26 December 2017, he released the single "Ulay Nedaber", his first song in Hebrew, which became his best-known song. On 19 August 2018, he released the single "Ma At Omeret", the second single from his second album. On 28 July 2019, he released the third single from his second album, "38 Ma'alot", which served as the theme song for the Israeli film Full Gas, in which Guedj also acted.

In March 2025, Guedj said publicly that his absence from music had been due to bipolar disorder, for which he had been hospitalized. In April 2025, he released the single "Mashuga" ("Crazy"), which he co-wrote with Navi Aharoni and Kfir Tzafrir. On 22 January 2026 he released his second album, and first in Hebrew, Bli Yad Al HaDofek ("Without a Hand on the Pulse"), ten songs mixing Israeli pop and R&B that draw on his personal life and relationships. It was made with several Israeli producers including Chen Cordova and Yonatan Salzberg. Reviewing the album for Maariv, Avi Kalili described it as a major step forward that moved him beyond his "Golden Boy" image.

== Acting career ==
In 2018, Guedj began his acting career in the third season of the Israeli teen drama Cadabra.

In 2019, he appeared in Full Gas, a youth film about off-road motorcycle racing written and directed by Kobi Metach, and sang its theme song, "38 Ma'alot".

In 2021, he appeared in the Israeli television series HaYoreshet on Channel 12.

== Artistry ==
=== Musical influences ===
Guedj listens to R&B, pop, soul and hip hop music, and has cited Pharrell Williams, Usher, Beyoncé, Chris Brown, Maroon 5, Snoop Dogg, Stevie Wonder, Michael Jackson, Justin Timberlake, Timbaland and others as his favorite artists. Early in his career he was dubbed the "Israeli Justin Timberlake" because of his musical style, but he described himself as "simple and regular Nadav".

== Discography ==
=== Albums ===
Title
Details
Notes
Nadav Guedj
- Released: 25 May 2016
- Label: Tedy Productions
- Format: Digital download

No.	Title	Length
1.	"Jump"	3:18
2.	"Hold The City"	3:34
3.	"Never Over"	3:08
4.	"Make You Mine"	3:30
5.	"Can't Control It"	3:09
6.	"Good Vibes"	3:37
7.	"Elle M'rend Fou"	3:41
8.	"Broken"	3:27
9.	"Golden Boy"	2:59

Bli Yad Al HaDofek
- Released: 22 January 2026
- Label: D-Music
- Format: Digital download, streaming

=== Singles ===
Title	Year	Peak chart positions								Album
Title	Year	ISR	AUT	BEL (FL)	FRA	GER	SWE	SWI	UK	Album
"Golden Boy"	2015	1	14	36	178	45	54	54	169	Nadav Guedj
"Good Vibes"	2015	1	—	—	—	—	—	—	—	Nadav Guedj
"Jump"	2015	3	—	—	—	—	—	—	—	Nadav Guedj
"Make You Mine"	2016	—	—	—	—	—	—	—	—	Nadav Guedj
"Hold the City"	2016	—	—	—	—	—	—	—	—	Nadav Guedj
"Elle M'rend Fou"	2016	7	—	—	—	—	—	—	—	Nadav Guedj
"Ulay Nedaber"	2017	3	—	—	—	—	—	—	—	TBA
"Ma At Omeret"	2018	2	—	—	—	—	—	—	—	TBA
"38 Ma'alot"	2019	—	—	—	—	—	—	—	—	TBA
"Lirkod"	2019	10	—	—	—	—	—	—	—	TBA
"Tnu Li Daka"	2020	19	—	—	—	—	—	—	—	TBA
"—" denotes release that did not chart or was not released.

Awards and achievements
Preceded by Evyatar Korkus	HaKokhav HaBa winner 2015	Succeeded by Hovi Star
Preceded by Mei Finegold with "Same Heart"	Israel in the Eurovision Song Contest; 2015	Succeeded by Hovi Star with "Made of Stars"
