= Golden Boy (Nadav Guedj song) =

2015 song by Nadav Guedj

Single by Nadav Guedj

from the album Nadav Guedj
- Released: 15 March 2015
- Recorded: February–March 2015
- Genre: Pop; Mizrahi
- Length: 3:00
- Label: Universal Music; Tedy Productions; Unicell
- Songwriter: Doron Medalie
- Producer: Yinon Yahel

Nadav Guedj singles chronology
"Golden Boy" (2015)	"Good Vibes" (2015)

Music video
- "Golden Boy" on YouTube

Eurovision Song Contest 2015 entry
- Country: Israel
- Artist: Nadav Guedj
- Language: English
- Composer: Doron Medalie
- Lyricist: Doron Medalie

Finals performance
- Semi-final result: 3rd
- Semi-final points: 151
- Final result: 9th
- Final points: 97

Entry chronology
- ◄ "Same Heart" (2014)
- "Made of Stars" (2016) ►

"Golden Boy" is a song performed by Israeli singer Nadav Guedj and was written by Doron Medalie. It was chosen by public broadcaster IBA to represent Israel in the Eurovision Song Contest 2015. The song was premièred on 12 March 2015. It was released as a digital download on 15 March 2015 as the lead single from his debut studio album Nadav Guedj (2016). It is the first ever Israeli Eurovision entry with lyrics entirely in the English language. Within the Eurovision Song Contest, the song went through to the grand final after finishing in 3rd place in the 2nd Semi-final. The song finished in 9th place in the grand final with 97 points.

== Track listing ==
Digital download
No.	Title	Length
1.	"Golden Boy"	3:00

== Music video ==
According to Eurovision Song Contest YouTube Channel, Nadav Guedj's Golden Boy live performance at 2nd Semi-final was the fifth most-watched video by subscribers on the channel (before Eurovision Song Contest 2016 begin), and the fourth most-watched 2015 video, just behind Måns Zelmerlöw, Polina Gagarina and Loic Nottet live performance videos.

== Cover versions ==
On 29 June 2015, Greek singer Eleni Foureira released a Greek-language version of the song, titled "Sto theo me paei" (Greek: Στο θεό με πάει, lit. 'Take Me to God'). It was performed at the 2015 MAD Video Music Awards.

On 11 July 2025, Croatian singer Maja Šuput released a Croatian-language version of the song, titled "Nisam ja za male stvari" (Croatian for 'I'm Not Into Little Things'). The Croatian lyrics were penned by Croatian singer and lyricist Antonija Šola.

== Chart performance ==
=== Weekly charts ===
Chart (2015)	Peak position
Austria (Ö3 Austria Top 40)	14
Belgium (Ultratop 50 Flanders)	36
Belgium (Ultratip Bubbling Under Wallonia)	48
France (SNEP)	178
Germany (GfK)	45
Israel (Media Forest)	1
Sweden (Sverigetopplistan)	44
Switzerland (Schweizer Hitparade)	54

== Release history ==
Region	Date	Format	Label
Israel	15 March 2015	Digital download	Universal Music; Tedy Productions; Unicell
