= Israel in the Eurovision Song Contest 2023 =

- Eurovision Song Contest 2023
- Country: Israel
- Selection process: Internal selection
- Announcement date: Artist: 10 August 2022; Song: 8 March 2023

Competing entry
- Song: "Unicorn"
- Artist: Noa Kirel
- Songwriters: Doron Medalie; May Sfadia; Yinon Yahel; Noa Kirel

Placement
- Semi-final result: Qualified (3rd, 127 points)
- Final result: 3rd, 362 points

Participation chronology

Israel was represented at the Eurovision Song Contest 2023 with the song "Unicorn", written by Doron Medalie, May Sfadia, Yinon Yahel, and Noa Kirel, and performed by Kirel herself. The Israeli participating broadcaster, the Israeli Public Broadcasting Corporation (IPBC/Kan), internally selected its entry for the contest. Kirel was announced as the Israeli representative on 10 August 2022, while the song, "Unicorn", was presented to the public on 8 March 2023.

Israel was drawn to compete in the first semi-final of the Eurovision Song Contest which took place on 9 May 2023. Performing during the show in position 9, "Unicorn" was announced among the top 10 entries of the first semi-final and therefore qualified to compete in the final on 13 May. It was later revealed that Israel placed third out of the 15 participating countries in the semi-final with 127 points. In the final, Israel performed in position 23 and placed third out of the 26 participating countries, scoring 362 points.

== Background ==
Prior to the 2023 contest, Israel has participated in the Eurovision Song Contest forty-four times since its first entry in 1973. Israel has won the contest on four occasions: in 1978 with the song "A-Ba-Ni-Bi" performed by Izhar Cohen and the Alphabeta, in 1979 with the song "Hallelujah" performed by Milk and Honey, in 1998 with the song "Diva" performed by Dana International and in 2018 with the song "Toy" performed by Netta Barzilai. Since the introduction of semi-finals to the format of the Eurovision Song Contest in 2004, Israel has, to this point, managed to qualify to the final eleven times, including three top ten results in 2005 with Shiri Maimon and "Hasheket Shenish'ar" placing fourth, in 2008 with Boaz and "The Fire In Your Eyes" placing ninth, and in 2015 with Nadav Guedj and "Golden Boy" placing ninth, in addition to the victory in 2018. In 2022, Michael Ben David with the song "I.M" failed to qualify for the final.

The Israeli national broadcaster, the Israeli Public Broadcasting Corporation (IPBC/Kan), has been in charge of the nation's participation in the contest since 2018. Kan confirmed its intention to participate in the 2023 contest on 12 June 2022. Between 2015 and 2020, the Israeli entry was selected through the reality singing competition HaKokhav HaBa L'Eirovizion ("The Next Star for Eurovision") in collaboration with Keshet and Tedy Productions, while in 2022, Kan cooperated with Reshet to select the Israeli entry through the reality singing competition The X Factor Israel. On 13 June 2022, Kan announced it would not continue the collaboration with Reshet and would conduct an internal selection to select the entry instead. This marked the first time since 2014 that Israel used an internal selection, and the first time that Kan independently selected the Israeli entry without collaborating with other broadcasters.

== Before Eurovision ==
=== Internal selection ===
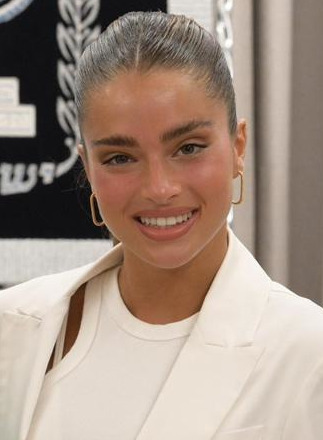
Noa Kirel was internally selected by the Israeli Public Broadcasting Corporation (IPBC/Kan) to represent Israel in the Eurovision Song Contest 2023.

The Israeli representative for the Eurovision Song Contest 2023 was internally selected by Kan. A special committee consisting of members from Kan, music editors and external representatives each suggested two artists from 78 initially considered based on airplay on Gimel and Galgalatz, and nominees for Singer of the Year and Group of the Year awards in 2019, 2020 and 2021. Among artists that were considered included Mergui, Ella-Lee Lahav, Noa Kirel, Static & Ben-El Tavori and Ran Danker. The members of the committee were Ofri Gopher (Director of Kan Music Stations), Yuval Cohen (Creative Director and Deputy Executive Producer of the Eurovision Song Contest 2019), Kobi Nussbaum (Head of Production at Kan), Sharon Drix (culture and entertainment director of Kan), Tali Katz (Head of Delegation for Israel at the Eurovision Song Contest), Tal Argaman (DJ and music editor at Kan 88), Yossi Gispan (lyricist), Eden Darso (singer-songwriter), Avia Farchi (MTV Israel presenter) and Leon Feldman (music editor and presenter). On 11 July 2022, Kan announced that Noa Kirel had topped the list with Mergui placing second. Despite Kirel stating the following day that she and her team had yet to make a decision, Israeli television channel HaHadashot 12 reported in early August 2022 that the invitation had been accepted by the singer, which was later confirmed during a press conference held at the Hotel Carlton in Tel Aviv on 10 August 2022.

Kirel was given artistic freedom from the Israeli broadcaster. The singer was offered songwriters from other countries, but decided to stick with a local Israeli team for Eurovision, adding that her song will contain "all kinds of ethnic, Mediterranean and even Israeli directions". In early September 2022, it was reported that the Israeli song would be created in a songwriting camp that would allow songwriters to work with each other to create their entry, with composers such as Doron Medalie, Ron Beaton, Jordi, Nitzan Kaykov, Itay Shimoni, and Eitan Peled all being rumoured to take part. In late September 2022, the Israeli budget for the contest was revealed to be around US$900,000, with a majority being covered by Kirel's team, and the rest by Kan.

On 17 January 2023, it was revealed that "Unicorn", written by Medalie, May Sfadia, Yinon Yahel and Kirel herself, was chosen to represent Israel from an initial pool of four songs. On 8 March, "Unicorn" and its accompanying music video was premiered during the special broadcast HaShir Shelanu L'Eirovizion ("Our Song for Eurovision") on Kan 11, as well as online via kan.org.il.

=== Promotion ===
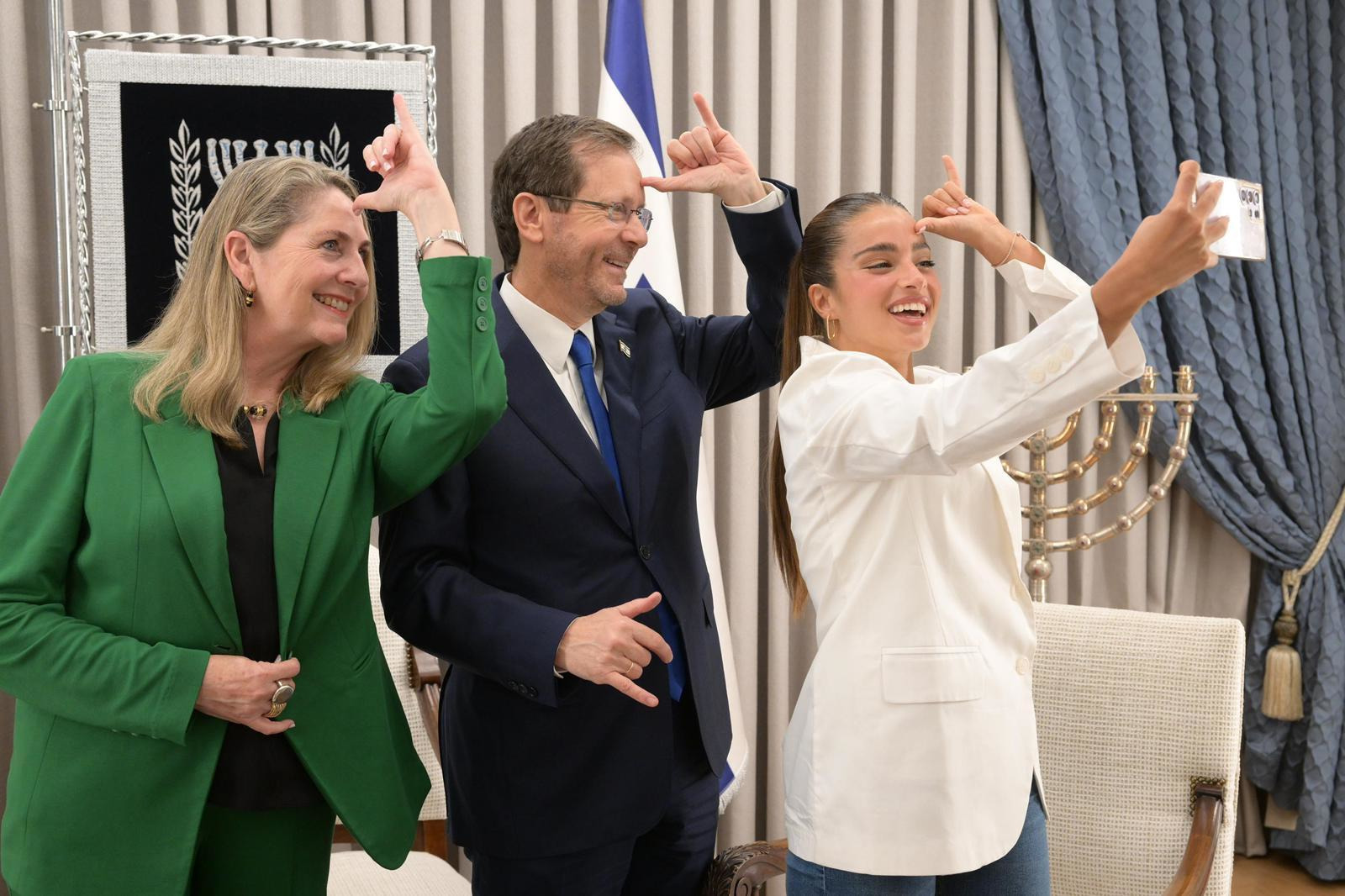
Noa Kirel (right), President Isaac Herzog and his wife Michal Herzog, demonstrate the "Unicorn" gesture during an honorary visit at the President's House in 2023

To promote the song, Kirel was featured with the president of Israel, Isaac Herzog, along with the First Lady of Israel, Michal Herzog. In interviews, Kirel was stated that she would show "chutzpah" during her Eurovision performance.

== At Eurovision ==
According to Eurovision rules, all nations with the exceptions of the host country and the "Big Five" (France, Germany, Italy, Spain and the United Kingdom) are required to qualify from one of two semi-finals in order to compete for the final; the top ten countries from each semi-final progress to the final. The European Broadcasting Union (EBU) split up the competing countries into six different pots based on voting patterns from previous contests, with countries with favourable voting histories put into the same pot. On 31 January 2023, an allocation draw was held, which placed each country into one of the two semi-finals, and determined which half of the show they would perform in. Israel has been placed into the first semi-final, to be held on 9 May 2023, and has been scheduled to perform in the second half of the show.

Once all the competing songs for the 2023 contest had been released, the running order for the semi-finals was decided by the shows' producers rather than through another draw, so that similar songs were not placed next to each other. Israel was set to perform in position 9, following the entry from Switzerland and before the entry from Moldova.

At the end of the show, Israel was announced as a qualifier for the final.

=== Voting ===
==== Points awarded to Israel ====
Points awarded to Israel (Semi-final 1)
Score	Televote
12 points	Azerbaijan; Czech Republic; Moldova; Rest of the World
10 points	
8 points	France; Latvia; Malta
7 points	Croatia; Portugal; Serbia; Switzerland
6 points	Ireland; Italy
5 points	Norway
4 points	Netherlands
3 points	Sweden
2 points	Germany
1 point	Finland

Points awarded to Israel (Final)
Score	Televote	Jury
12 points	Armenia; Azerbaijan; Cyprus; Rest of the World	Armenia; Azerbaijan; France; Italy; Poland
10 points	France; Moldova; San Marino	Belgium; Lithuania; Serbia
8 points	Czech Republic	Croatia; Greece; Spain
7 points	Greece; Serbia; Spain	Cyprus; Ireland; Georgia; Malta
6 points	Georgia; Malta; Netherlands; Romania	Albania
5 points	Albania; Australia; Belgium; Italy; Latvia; Poland; Portugal	Latvia; Sweden
4 points	Croatia	Estonia; Romania; United Kingdom
3 points	Lithuania; Norway; Switzerland; United Kingdom	Norway
2 points		Netherlands
1 point	Austria; Ireland; Ukraine	Switzerland; Ukraine

==== Points awarded by Israel ====
Points awarded by Israel (Semi-final 1)
Score	Televote
12 points	Finland
10 points	Norway
8 points	Czech Republic
7 points	Sweden
6 points	Moldova
5 points	Croatia
4 points	Switzerland
3 points	Portugal
2 points	Malta
1 point	Azerbaijan

Points awarded by Israel (Final)
Score	Televote	Jury
12 points	Finland	Sweden
10 points	Norway	Norway
8 points	Ukraine	Finland
7 points	Italy	Ukraine
6 points	Croatia	Austria
5 points	Moldova	Estonia
4 points	Sweden	Czech Republic
3 points	Armenia	Belgium
2 points	Czech Republic	Poland
1 point	France	Cyprus

==== Detailed voting results ====
The following members comprised the Israeli jury:

- Amir Ben-David
- Ron Biton
- Adi "Perry" Cohen
- Tal Argaman Peleg
- Yasmin Ishbi

Detailed voting results from Israel (Semi-final 1)
R/O	Country	Televote	
R/O	Country	Rank	Points
01	Norway	2	10
02	Malta	9	2
03	Serbia	13	
04	Latvia	12	
05	Portugal	8	3
06	Ireland	14	
07	Croatia	6	5
08	Switzerland	7	4
09	Israel		
10	Moldova	5	6
11	Sweden	4	7
12	Azerbaijan	10	1
13	Czech Republic	3	8
14	Netherlands	11	
15	Finland	1	12

Detailed voting results from Israel (Final)
R/O	Country	Jury							Televote	
R/O	Country	Juror 1	Juror 2	Juror 3	Juror 4	Juror 5	Rank	Points	Rank	Points
01	Austria	1	5	20	6	16	5	6	13	
02	Portugal	23	20	24	21	21	25		18	
03	Switzerland	10	6	5	19	10	12		15	
04	Poland	2	16	10	7	22	9	2	14	
05	Serbia	22	21	9	14	17	16		23	
06	France	21	22	23	15	18	21		10	1
07	Cyprus	11	7	21	5	7	10	1	12	
08	Spain	9	12	8	11	14	14		19	
09	Sweden	3	1	1	3	1	1	12	7	4
10	Albania	24	17	22	16	13	20		24	
11	Italy	12	11	11	13	9	15		4	7
12	Estonia	13	10	13	4	3	6	5	20	
13	Finland	18	2	2	22	4	3	8	1	12
14	Czech Republic	4	9	12	10	5	7	4	9	2
15	Australia	17	14	18	17	20	19		11	
16	Belgium	5	13	7	8	6	8	3	21	
17	Armenia	8	24	6	12	15	13		8	3
18	Moldova	16	8	4	9	11	11		6	5
19	Ukraine	6	4	16	2	8	4	7	3	8
20	Norway	7	3	3	1	2	2	10	2	10
21	Germany	20	18	19	24	25	22		17	
22	Lithuania	15	19	15	20	12	17		25	
23	Israel									
24	Slovenia	14	23	14	18	19	18		16	
25	Croatia	25	15	25	25	24	24		5	6
26	United Kingdom	19	25	17	23	23	23		22	
