= Israel in the Eurovision Song Contest 2020 =

- Eurovision Song Contest 2020
- Country: Israel
- Selection process: Artist: HaKokhav HaBa L'Eirovizion; Song: HaShir HaBa L'Eirovizion
- Selection date: Artist: 4 February 2020; Song: 3 March 2020

Competing entry
- Song: "Feker Libi"
- Artist: Eden Alene
- Songwriters: Doron Medalie; Idan Raichel

Placement
- Final result: Contest cancelled

Participation chronology

Israel was set to be represented at the Eurovision Song Contest 2020 with the song "Feker Libi", written by Doron Medalie and Idan Raichel, and performed by Eden Alene. The Israeli participating broadcaster, the Israeli Public Broadcasting Corporation (IPBC/Kan), collaborated with the commercial broadcaster Keshet and Tedy Productions to organise the reality singing competition HaKokhav HaBa L'Eirovizion ("The Next Star for Eurovision"). The competition was won by Alene, and a separate national final, HaShir HaBa L'Eirovizion ("The Next Song for Eurovision"), was held to select her entry. However, the contest was cancelled due to the COVID-19 pandemic.

== Background ==
Prior to the 2020 Contest, Israel had participated in the Eurovision Song Contest forty-two times since its first entry in 1973. Israel has won the contest on four occasions: in 1978 with the song "A-Ba-Ni-Bi" performed by Izhar Cohen and the Alphabeta, in 1979 with the song "Hallelujah" performed by Milk and Honey, in 1998 with the song "Diva" performed by Dana International and in 2018 with the song "Toy" performed by Netta Barzilai. Since the introduction of the semi-finals in 2004, Israel has failed to reach the final six times. In 2005, Shiri Maimon gave the country its tenth top five result, finishing fourth. Having failed to qualify for the final for four consecutive years (2011–14), Israel reached the final for the first time in five years, with Nadav Guedj finishing ninth in 2015, and the country has participated in the final every year since. Israel's fourth victory came when Netta won the 2018 contest in Lisbon, with the song "Toy". The following year, when the contest was held in Tel Aviv, Kobi Marimi represented the country on home soil with the song "Home", finishing twenty-third with 35 points in the final.

The Israeli entry for the 2020 contest was selected through the reality singing competition HaKokhav HaBa L'Eirovizion ("The Next Star for Eurovision"), which was organised by Keshet and Tedy Productions. This was the fifth time that the Israeli entry was selected through a collaboration with Keshet and Tedy Productions. An additional show also enabled the public to select the song that the Israeli representative will sing, which had previously been selected internally.

== Before Eurovision ==
=== HaKokhav HaBa L'Eirovizion ===
The singer who will perform the Israeli entry for the Eurovision Song Contest 2020 was selected through the reality singing competition HaKokhav HaBa L'Eirovizion ("The Next Star for Eurovision"), the original version of the international format Rising Star produced by Tedy Productions and Keshet Media Group. HaKokhav HaBa had been used since 2015 to select the Israeli artist for Eurovision. The shows were hosted by Assi Azar and Rotem Sela and featured a judging panel composed of Asaf Amdursky, Keren Peles, Shiri Maimon (2005 Israeli Eurovision entrant), Static & Ben El Tavori and Itay Levi.

The competition commenced on 20 November 2019. All shows in the competition were broadcast on Keshet 12 as well as online via mako.co.il.

==== Shows ====
===== Auditions =====
The auditions were broadcast between 20 November and 18 December 2019. In total, 59 contestants qualified for the next phase of the competition following the withdrawal of Itzik Shamli, one of the previously qualified contestants.

Among the contestants were Ohad Shragai, a finalist of Kokhav Nolad season 8 and one of the composers behind "Home", the Israeli entry in 2019; Eden Alene, the winner of the X Factor Israel season 3; Moran Aharoni, a competitor of Kokhav Nolad season 4; Nicki Goldstein, a comedian who participated in the 2011 and 2013 Israeli national finals; Lihi Toledano, the daughter of the 1982 Israeli representative Avi Toledano; Daniel Ben-Haim, a competitor of Kokhav Nolad season 5; Eddie, a competitor of The Voice Israel season 1; Judah Gavra, who participated in the 2013 Israeli and 2018 Sammarinese national finals; and Liora Itzhak, an Indian-born singer.

Shefita, who placed third in the 2019 Israeli national final, performed as two different characters during the auditions and the shortlisting rounds and withdrew from the competition after her performances.

Audition 1 – 20 November 2019
Draw	Artist	Song	Judges' Vote					Score	Result
Draw	Artist	Song	A. Amdursky	Static & B. El Tavori	S. Maimon	K. Peles	I. Levi	Score	Result
1	Ella-Lee Lahav	"You Don't Own Me"	Yes	Yes	Yes	Yes	Yes	96%	Advanced
2	Ilor Bar	"Power"	No	Yes	Yes	No	Yes	67%	Eliminated
3	Ohad Shragai	"I Wanna Dance with Somebody"	Yes	Yes	Yes	Yes	Yes	88%	Advanced
4	Noa Maman	"Khayati"	No	Yes	No	Yes	Yes	60%	Eliminated
5	Raviv Kaner	"Angels"	Yes	Yes	Yes	Yes	Yes	93%	Advanced
6	Danielle Ben Efraim	"Neshima"	No	Yes	Yes	No	Yes	72%	Advanced
7	Orr Amrami-Brockman	"Ma ata rotse mimeni"	Yes	Yes	Yes	Yes	Yes	97%	Advanced

Audition 2 – 23 November 2019
Draw	Artist	Song	Judges' Vote					Score	Result
Draw	Artist	Song	A. Amdursky	Static & B. El Tavori	S. Maimon	K. Peles	I. Levi	Score	Result
1	Eden Alene	"Alive"	No	Yes	Yes	Yes	Yes	87%	Advanced
2	Yanai Ben Hamo	"Yesh en sof"	Yes	Yes	Yes	Yes	Yes	88%	Advanced
3	Lee Eller	"Sheva ba'erev"	No	Yes	Yes	No	Yes	63%	Eliminated
4	Lali Kolishkin	"Stay"	Yes	Yes	Yes	Yes	Yes	95%	Advanced
5	Avihu Pinhasov Rhythm Club	"Hilton Tel Aviv" / "Yamim yafim"	Yes	Yes	Yes	Yes	Yes	79%	Advanced
6	Adam Lahav	"Crazy in Love"	No	Yes	Yes	Yes	Yes	67%	Eliminated
7	Loai Ali	"Tslil meitar"	No	Yes	Yes	Yes	Yes	79%	Advanced

Audition 3 – 24 November 2019
Draw	Artist	Song	Judges' Vote					Score	Result
Draw	Artist	Song	A. Amdursky	Static & B. El Tavori	S. Maimon	K. Peles	I. Levi	Score	Result
1	Ido Kolton	"Rise Up"	No	Yes	Yes	Yes	Yes	72%	Advanced
2	Ram Naim	"Tafast li makom"	No	No	No	No	Yes	41%	Eliminated
3	Dana Lapidot	"All by Myself"	No	Yes	Yes	Yes	Yes	88%	Advanced

Audition 4 – 27 November 2019
Draw	Artist	Song	Judges' Vote					Score	Result
Draw	Artist	Song	A. Amdursky	Static & B. El Tavori	S. Maimon	K. Peles	I. Levi	Score	Result
1	Gaya Shaki	"Set Fire to the Rain"	Yes	Yes	Yes	Yes	Yes	87%	Advanced
2	Gafna Rachel Pinto	"Listen"	Yes	Yes	No	No	Yes	69%	Eliminated
3	Yohai Tzarfati	"Mitga'aga'at"	No	Yes	Yes	Yes	Yes	71%	Advanced
4	Nathan Katorza	"It Will Rain"	Yes	Yes	Yes	Yes	Yes	88%	Advanced
5	Yuval Beider-Peretz	"Hakol ad lekan"	Yes	Yes	No	Yes	No	67%	Saved
6	Omer Eliyahu	"Rak shelach"	No	Yes	Yes	Yes	Yes	83%	Advanced
7	David Sodi	"Halev sheli"	No	No	No	No	Yes	28%	Eliminated
8	Galit Fahima	"Oolai hapa'am"	Yes	Yes	No	No	Yes	49%	Eliminated
9	Dorel Saadon	"Someone You Loved"	Yes	Yes	Yes	Yes	Yes	95%	Advanced

Audition 5 – 30 November 2019
Draw	Artist	Song	Judges' Vote					Score	Result
Draw	Artist	Song	A. Amdursky	Static & B. El Tavori	S. Maimon	K. Peles	I. Levi	Score	Result
1	Yahel Yaish	"Soldi"	No	Yes	Yes	Yes	No	71%	Advanced
2	Zohar Manor	"Nana Banana"	Yes	Yes	Yes	Yes	Yes	88%	Advanced
3	Moran Aharoni	"Believer"	Yes	Yes	Yes	Yes	Yes	88%	Advanced
4	Sagi Trabelsi	"Lekh im ha'emet shelkha"	No	No	—	Yes	No	46%	Eliminated
5	Racheli Tareka	"Issues"	Yes	Yes	Yes	Yes	Yes	87%	Advanced
6	Nicki Goldstein	"Someone You Loved"	No	Yes	Yes	Yes	Yes	85%	Advanced
7	Stefanie Dúnio	"Whenever, Wherever"	No	Yes	Yes	Yes	No	65%	Eliminated
8	Lihi Toledano	"Af akhat"	Yes	Yes	Yes	Yes	Yes	91%	Advanced

Audition 6 – 1 December 2019
Draw	Artist	Song	Judges' Vote					Score	Result
Draw	Artist	Song	A. Amdursky	Static & B. El Tavori	S. Maimon	K. Peles	I. Levi	Score	Result
1	Shira Gavrielov	"Shallow"	Yes	Yes	Yes	Yes	Yes	91%	Advanced
2	Dave Spektor	"Caruso"	No	Yes	Yes	—	Yes	58%	Saved
3	Itzik Shamli	"Kama haser"	No	Yes	Yes	Yes	Yes	81%	Withdrew

Audition 7 – 2 December 2019
Draw	Artist	Song	Judges' Vote					Score	Result
Draw	Artist	Song	A. Amdursky	Static & B. El Tavori	S. Maimon	K. Peles	I. Levi	Score	Result
1	Daniel Ben Haim	"Ve'im tavo'i elai"	No	Yes	Yes	Yes	Yes	81%	Advanced
2	Kim Kate Rose	"Addicted to You"	No	Yes	—	Yes	—	49%	Eliminated
3	Or Eddie	"Barcelona"	Yes	Yes	Yes	Yes	Yes	77%	Advanced

Audition 8 – 4 December 2019
Draw	Artist	Song	Judges' Vote					Score	Result
Draw	Artist	Song	A. Amdursky	Static & B. El Tavori	S. Maimon	K. Peles	I. Levi	Score	Result
1	Yinon Hagag	"Tagidi lo"	Yes	Yes	Yes	Yes	No	80%	Advanced
2	Oneg Israel	"Turning Tables"	Yes	Yes	Yes	Yes	No	80%	Advanced
3	Barak Biton	"Livchor nachon"	No	Yes	— (Note: Maimon did not vote due to her personal connection with the competitor.)	No	No	46%	Eliminated
4	Ofer Naveh	"Laisse-moi t'aimer"	No	Yes	Yes	Yes	Yes	71%	Advanced
5	Shira Tzafari	"Karma Police"	No	No	Yes	Yes	Yes	58%	Saved
6	Judah Gavra	"Somebody to Love"	No	No	—	No	No	33%	Eliminated
7	Galit Weizman	"The Show Must Go On"	Yes	Yes	Yes	Yes	Yes	77%	Advanced

Audition 9 – 7 December 2019
Draw	Artist	Song	Judges' Vote					Score	Result
Draw	Artist	Song	A. Amdursky	Static & B. El Tavori	S. Maimon	K. Peles	I. Levi	Score	Result
1	Eden Zohar Sivan	"Who's Lovin' You"	Yes	Yes	Yes	Yes	Yes	92%	Advanced
2	80 Vemashu	"Big in Japan"	Yes	Yes	Yes	Yes	No	55%	Eliminated
3	Nethanel Sherf	"Ma ata rotse mimeni"	Yes	Yes	Yes	Yes	Yes	86%	Advanced
4	Eilon Elkayam	"Haim shlemim"	No	Yes	Yes	Yes	Yes	80%	Advanced
5	Layla Suleiman	"Beautiful"	Yes	Yes	Yes	Yes	Yes	80%	Withdrew
6	Alan Butcher	"Balaila"	Yes	Yes	Yes	—	Yes	84%	Advanced
7	Lidor Sailo	"Cry Me a River"	No	No	No	Yes	No	53%	Eliminated

Audition 10 – 8 December 2019
Draw	Artist	Song	Judges' Vote					Score	Result
Draw	Artist	Song	A. Amdursky	Static & B. El Tavori	S. Maimon	K. Peles	I. Levi	Score	Result
1	HaTavlinim	"Nim'as li mimekh"	No	Yes	— (Note: Maimon did not vote due to her personal connection with one of the members of the band.)	Yes	Yes	59%	Saved
2	Noa Farag	"Without You"	No	No (Note: In this audition Peles and Tavori switched places. Therefore, Peles voted alongside Static and Tavori voted on his own.)	Yes	Yes	Yes	66%	Eliminated
3	Eldad Cohen	"Klum lo ta'im"	Yes	Yes	Yes	Yes	Yes	78%	Advanced

Audition 11 – 9 December 2019
Draw	Artist	Song	Judges' Vote					Score	Result
Draw	Artist	Song	A. Amdursky	Static & B. El Tavori	S. Maimon	K. Peles	I. Levi	Score	Result
1	Gaella Brown	"Ain't Nobody"	—	—	Yes	Yes	Yes	75%	Advanced
2	Nave Mamo	"Hello"	No	No	No	Yes	No	51%	Eliminated
3	Liora Itzhak	"Mala mala"	Yes	Yes	Yes	Yes	No	74%	Advanced

Audition 12 – 11 December 2019
Draw	Artist	Song	Judges' Vote					Score	Result
Draw	Artist	Song	A. Amdursky	Static & B. El Tavori	S. Maimon	K. Peles	I. Levi	Score	Result
1	Chen Hadar	"Jealous"	No	Yes	Yes	Yes	Yes	83%	Advanced
2	Michael Tsidon	"Khayati"	—	Yes	Yes	Yes	Yes	72%	Advanced
3	Atara Oryah	"Achshav o l'olam"	—	Yes	Yes	Yes	Yes	73%	Advanced
4	Hila Vaknin	"Rak otkha"	No	No	No	No	No	17%	Eliminated
5	Dikla Malka	"Stone Cold"	No	Yes	Yes	No	Yes	66%	Saved
6	Wonder Years	"It Must Be Love"	No	Yes	Yes	Yes	Yes	77%	Advanced
7	Bar Furman	"Something's Got a Hold on Me"	No	Yes	Yes	Yes	No	78%	Advanced

Audition 13 – 14 December 2019
Draw	Artist	Song	Judges' Vote					Score	Result
Draw	Artist	Song	A. Amdursky	Static & B. El Tavori	S. Maimon	K. Peles	I. Levi	Score	Result
1	HaHertzelim	"Soldi"	No	Yes	Yes	Yes	Yes	77%	Advanced
2	Oren Ettinger	"Crazy"	Yes	Yes	Yes	Yes	Yes	85%	Advanced
3	Yuval Gez	"Over the Rainbow"	Yes	Yes	Yes	No	Yes	69%	Eliminated
4	Eden Shabi	"Mima at mefahedet"	No	Yes	Yes	Yes	Yes	72%	Advanced
5	Lital David	"Jealous"	No	No	No	Yes	Yes	46%	Saved
6	Zion Huri	"Hurricane"	No	Yes	Yes	Yes	Yes	77%	Advanced
7	Rotem Edri Tuchner	"Djadja"	No	Yes	No	No	— (Note: Levi did not vote due to his personal connection with the competitor.)	47%	Eliminated

Audition 14 – 15 December 2019
Draw	Artist	Song	Judges' Vote					Score	Result
Draw	Artist	Song	A. Amdursky	Static & B. El Tavori	S. Maimon	K. Peles	I. Levi	Score	Result
1	Yossi Asher	"En li ahava"	Yes	No	Yes	No	Yes	51%	Saved
2	Noy Halperin	"Never Enough"	No	Yes	Yes	Yes	No	72%	Advanced
3	Maya Eliyahu	"Shkufim"	No	No	No	Yes	No	48%	Eliminated
4	Ron Peretz	"Roobama"	Yes	Yes	No	Yes	Yes	81%	Advanced

Audition 15 – 18 December 2019
Draw	Artist	Song	Judges' Vote					Score	Result
Draw	Artist	Song	A. Amdursky	Static & B. El Tavori	S. Maimon	K. Peles	I. Levi	Score	Result
1	Lidor Ben Atia	"Shetisaref ha'ahava"	Yes	Yes	Yes	Yes	Yes	70%	Advanced
2	Linoy Akala (Note: In the audition, Linoy Akala participated alone. Gil Shapira joined her only from the shortlisting round.)	"Get Lucky"	—	No	No	Yes	—	41%	Saved
3	Ben Tzur	"Shmama"	No	Yes	No	No	Yes	56%	Eliminated
4	Shir Argi	"Yerushalayim shel zahav"	Yes	Yes	Yes	Yes	Yes	88%	Advanced
5	Amit Sadan	"You Should See Me in a Crown"	Yes	No	No	No	No	41%	Eliminated
6	Shiran Avayou	"It's My Life"	Yes	Yes	Yes	Yes	Yes	92%	Advanced

===== Shortlisting rounds =====
Shortlisting Round 1 – 21 December 2019
Draw	Artist	Song	Judges' Vote					Score	Result
Draw	Artist	Song	A. Amdursky	Static & B. El Tavori	S. Maimon	K. Peles	I. Levi	Score	Result
1	Ohad Shragai	"Mono"	No	Yes	Yes	Yes	No	60%	Saved
2	Lali Kolishkin	"Addicted to You"	Yes	Yes	Yes	Yes	Yes	100%	Advanced
3	Yahel Yaish	"Perfect"	—	Yes	No	No	No	20%	Eliminated
4	Gaya Shaki	"Bad Romance"	Yes	—	Yes	Yes	Yes	80%	Saved
5	Ella-Lee Lahav	"Into You"	Yes	Yes	Yes	Yes	Yes	100%	Advanced
6	Galit Weizman	"Russian Roulette"	No	No	Yes	Yes	Yes	60%	Eliminated
7	Atara Oryah	Original song	No	Yes	No	No	—	20%	Eliminated
8	Eden Shabi	"Aluf haolam"	No	Yes	Yes	No	No	40%	Eliminated
9	Zion Huri	"Proud"	No	No	Yes	No	No	20%	Eliminated
10	Lidor Ben Atia	"HaLev sheli"	Yes	Yes	Yes	—	Yes	80%	Eliminated
11	Orr Amrami-Brockman	"Nitzakht iti hakol"	Yes	Yes	Yes	Yes	Yes	100%	Advanced

Shortlisting Round 2 – 25 December 2019
Draw	Artist	Song	Judges' Vote					Score	Result
Draw	Artist	Song	A. Amdursky	Static & B. El Tavori	S. Maimon	K. Peles	I. Levi	Score	Result
1	Raviv Kaner	"Sign of the Times"	Yes	Yes	Yes	Yes	Yes	100%	Advanced
2	Moran Aharoni	"Love Runs Out"	Yes	Yes	Yes	Yes	Yes	100%	Advanced
3	Dikla Malka	"Who's Lovin' You"	No	Yes	—	No	No	20%	Eliminated
4	Michael Tsidon	"Aramam"	—	Yes (Note: Levi was not present during the performance, therefore Static and El Tavori voted separately.)	Yes	Yes	Yes	80%	Eliminated
5	Ofer Naveh	"Yekariti"	Yes	Yes	—	Yes	No	60%	Eliminated
6	HaTavlinim	"Tango"	Yes	No	Yes	Yes	Yes	80%	Saved
7	Lital David	"Freedom"	No	No	No	—	—	0%	Eliminated
8	Eilon Elkayam	"Misheo oleh tamid iti"	No	No	—	No	—	0%	Eliminated
9	Alan Butcher	"Impossible"	No	—	No	No	—	0%	Eliminated
10	Or Eddie	"Ohevet oti amiti"	No	Yes	Yes	Yes	No	60%	Saved
11	Avihu Pinhasov Rhythm Club	"Avrom"	Yes	Yes	Yes	Yes	Yes	100%	Advanced

Shortlisting Round 3 – 28 December 2019
Draw	Artist	Song	Judges' Vote					Score	Result
Draw	Artist	Song	A. Amdursky	Static & B. El Tavori	S. Maimon	K. Peles	I. Levi	Score	Result
1	Dorel Saadon	"Heaven"	Yes	Yes	Yes	Yes	Yes	100%	Advanced
2	Eden Alene	"Fallin'"	Yes	Yes	Yes	Yes	Yes	100%	Advanced
3	Yuval Beider-Peretz	"Veulai"	No	—	No	Yes	No	20%	Eliminated
4	Omer Eliyahu	"Shuvi lebeitech"	No	Yes	Yes	Yes	Yes	80%	Saved
5	Sarah Hoffman	"Womanizer"	Yes	Yes	Yes	Yes	—	80%	Withdrew
6	Nicki Goldstein	"Million Reasons"	No	Yes	Yes	Yes	No	60%	Saved
7	Yohai Tzarfati	"Shmama"	Yes	Yes	Yes	—	No	60%	Eliminated
8	Bar Furman	"Skyfall"	No	No	Yes	Yes	Yes	60%	Eliminated
9	Dana Lapidot	"Mangina"	Yes	Yes	Yes	Yes	Yes	100%	Advanced

Shortlisting Round 4 – 29 December 2019
Draw	Artist	Song	Judges' Vote					Score	Result
Draw	Artist	Song	A. Amdursky	Static & B. El Tavori	S. Maimon	K. Peles	I. Levi	Score	Result
1	Nathan Katorza	"Can't Take My Eyes Off You"	Yes	Yes	Yes	Yes	Yes	100%	Advanced
2	Linoy and Gil	"You're the One That I Want"	Yes	Yes	Yes	Yes	Yes	100%	Advanced
3	Yossi Asher	"Besof mitraglim lehakol"	Yes	Yes	—	Yes	Yes	80%	Eliminated
4	Ron Peretz	"Af echad lo ba li"	—	No	No	No	No	0%	Eliminated
5	Lihi Toledano	"Melade"	Yes	Yes	Yes	No	No	60%	Eliminated
6	Shiran Avayou	"Poison"	—	Yes	—	Yes	Yes	60%	Eliminated
7	Nethanel Sherf	"Hello"	No	Yes	No	—	No	20%	Eliminated
8	Eden Zohar Sivan	"I Wish"	No	—	Yes	Yes	Yes	60%	Saved
9	Loai Ali	"Kehev shel lohamim"	No	Yes	Yes	Yes	Yes	80%	Saved
10	Oneg Israel	"Aieka"	Yes	Yes	Yes	No	No	60%	Saved

Eliminated contestants whose performances were not included in the shows
Chen Hadar	Ido Kolton	Shira Tzafari	Daniel Ben Haim
Liora Itzhak	Wonder Years	Danielle Ben Efraim	Noy Halperin
Yanai Ben Hamo	Dave Spektor	Oren Ettinger	Yinon Hagag
Eldad Cohen	Racheli Tareka	Zohar Manor	Gaella Brown
Shir Argi	HaHertzelim	Shira Gavrielov	

===== Top 20 round =====
Top 20 Round – Show 1 – 4 January 2020
Duel	Draw	Artist	Song	Judges' Vote					Score	Result
Duel	Draw	Artist	Song	A. Amdursky	Static & B. El Tavori	S. Maimon	K. Peles	I. Levi	Score	Result
I	1	Eden Alene	"Power"	Yes	Yes	Yes	Yes	Yes	86%	Advanced
I	2	HaTavlinim	"Tel Aviv balayla"	Yes	Yes	Yes	Yes	Yes	70%	Saved
II	3	Or Eddie	"Kmo Cinderella"	No	Yes	Yes	No	Yes	50%	Eliminated
II	4	Orr Amrami-Brockman	"Kol yom kmo ness"	Yes	Yes	Yes	Yes	Yes	88%	Advanced
III	5	Nathan Katorza	"Uptown Funk"	Yes	Yes	Yes	No	Yes	70%	Eliminated
III	6	Gaya Shaki	"Crazy"	Yes	Yes	Yes	Yes	Yes	92%	Advanced
IV	7	Ella-Lee Lahav	"Hey Mama"	Yes	Yes	Yes	Yes	Yes	90%	Advanced
IV	8	Nicki Goldstein	"Creep"	No	Yes	Yes	Yes	Yes	73%	Saved

Top 20 Round – Show 2 – 5 January 2020
Duel	Draw	Artist	Song	Judges' Vote					Score	Result
Duel	Draw	Artist	Song	A. Amdursky	Static & B. El Tavori	S. Maimon	K. Peles	I. Levi	Score	Result
V	9	Avihu Pinhasov Rhythm Club	"Zingara" / "Neshama kapara mami"	No	Yes	Yes	Yes	No	52%	Saved
V	10	Linoy and Gil	"Diamonds"	No	No	No	Yes	Yes	67%	Advanced
VI	11	Ohad Shragai	"Wake Me Up"	No	Yes	Yes	Yes	No	57%	Saved
VI	12	Eden Zohar Sivan	"Doo Wop (That Thing)"	Yes	Yes	Yes	Yes	Yes	80%	Advanced
VII	13	Dana Lapidot	"I Don't Want to Miss a Thing"	No	No	Yes	No	Yes	61%	Eliminated
VII	14	Moran Aharoni	"River"	Yes	Yes	Yes	Yes	Yes	85%	Advanced
VIII	15	Raviv Kaner	"The Show Must Go On"	No	Yes	No	Yes	No	55%	Saved
VIII	16	Dorel Saadon	"All of Me"	Yes	Yes	Yes	Yes	Yes	88%	Advanced

Top 20 Round – Show 3 – 9 January 2020
Duel	Draw	Artist	Song	Judges' Vote					Score	Result
Duel	Draw	Artist	Song	A. Amdursky	Static & B. El Tavori	S. Maimon	K. Peles	I. Levi	Score	Result
IX	17	Oneg Israel	"Proud Mary"	Yes	Yes	No	No	No	47%	Eliminated
IX	18	Lali Kolishkin	"Turning Tables"	Yes	Yes	Yes	Yes	Yes	88%	Advanced
X	19	Loai Ali	"Lindana Lindana"	No	No	Yes	Yes	Yes	60%	Saved
X	20	Omer Eliyahu	"Pri ganeh"	No	No	No	Yes	Yes	68%	Advanced

===== Elimination shows =====
====== Heat 1 ======
Heat 1 – Part 1 – 11 January 2020
Duel	Draw	Artist	Song	Judges' Vote					Score	Result
Duel	Draw	Artist	Song	A. Amdursky	Static & B. El Tavori	S. Maimon	K. Peles	I. Levi	Score	Result
I	1	Eden Alene and Moran Aharoni	"A Natural Woman"	Yes	Yes	Yes	Yes	Yes	92%	Advanced
I	2	Dorel Saadon and Eden Zohar Sivan	"Stand by Me"	Yes	Yes	Yes	Yes	No	75%	Saved
II	3	HaTavlinim	"Shnei meshugaim"	No	Yes	Yes	Yes	Yes	60%	Eliminated
II	4	Ohad Shragai	"Hey"	No	Yes	Yes	Yes	Yes	77%	Advanced
III	5	Avihu Pinhasov Rhythm Club	"Einaim sheli"	Yes	Yes	No	Yes	No	45%	Saved
III	6	Loai Ali	"Ratsiti ledaber itcha"	No	Yes	Yes	Yes	Yes	78%	Advanced
IV	7	Linoy and Gil	"Eretz ktana im safam"	No	No	—	Yes	Yes	35%	Eliminated
IV	8	Raviv Kaner	"Aba"	No	Yes	Yes	Yes	No	67%	Advanced
V	9	Ella-Lee Lahav and Orr Amrami-Brockman	"Señorita"	Yes	Yes	Yes	Yes	Yes	95%	Advanced

Heat 1 – Part 2 – 13 January 2020
Duel	Draw	Artist	Song	Judges' Vote					Score	Result
Duel	Draw	Artist	Song	A. Amdursky	Static & B. El Tavori	S. Maimon	K. Peles	I. Levi	Score	Result
V	10	Gaya Shaki and Lali Kolishkin	"Umbrella"	Yes	Yes	Yes	Yes	Yes	88%	Saved
VI	11	Omer Eliyahu	"BMW shora" / "Nimas mimeh"	No	No	No	No	Yes	50%	Advanced
VI	12	Nicki Goldstein	"California Dreamin'"	No	Yes	No	No	No	45%	Eliminated

====== Heat 2 ======
Heat 2 – Part 1 – 16 January 2020
Draw	Artist	Song	Judges' Vote					Score	Result
Draw	Artist	Song	A. Amdursky	B. El Tavori	S. Maimon	K. Peles	Static	Score	Result
1	Ella-Lee Lahav	"I Kissed a Girl"	Yes	Yes	Yes	Yes	Yes	84%	Advanced
2	Moran Aharoni	"Always Remember Us This Way"	Yes	Yes	Yes	Yes	Yes	83%	Advanced
3	Ohad Shragai	"Ve'im preda"	No	Yes	Yes	Yes	Yes	68%	Advanced
4	Lali Kolishkin	"Wings"	Yes	Yes	Yes	Yes	Yes	89%	Advanced
5	Eden Alene	"Iloo yakholti"	Yes	Yes	Yes	Yes	Yes	86%	Advanced

Heat 2 – Part 2 – 18 January 2020
Draw	Artist	Song	Judges' Vote					Score	Result
Draw	Artist	Song	A. Amdursky	B. El Tavori	S. Maimon	K. Peles	Static	Score	Result
6	Eden Zohar Sivan	"Sax"	Yes	Yes	Yes	Yes	Yes	84%	Advanced
7	Raviv Kaner	"Feeling Good"	Yes	Yes	Yes	Yes	Yes	90%	Advanced
8	Gaya Shaki	"Halomot shel aherim"	Yes	Yes	Yes	Yes	Yes	71%	Advanced
9	Orr Amrami-Brockman	"Ad mahar"	No	Yes	Yes	Yes	Yes	83%	Advanced
10	Avihu Pinhasov Rhythm Club	"Let's Dance"	Yes	No	No	Yes	Yes	43%	Eliminated
11	Omer Eliyahu	"Mima at mefahedet"	No	Yes	Yes	Yes	Yes	76%	Advanced
12	Dorel Saadon	"The Reason"	No	Yes	Yes	Yes	Yes	77%	Advanced
13	Loai Ali	"Livhor nakhon"	Yes	Yes	Yes	Yes	Yes	85%	Advanced

====== Heat 3 ======
Heat 3 – Part 1 – 19 January 2020
Duel	Draw	Artist	Song	Judges' Vote					Score	Result
Duel	Draw	Artist	Song	A. Amdursky	Static & B. El Tavori	S. Maimon	M. Mesika (Note: Levi was not present during the heat; his position was filled by guest judge Miri Mesika.)	K. Peles	Score	Result
I	1	Eden Zohar Sivan	"Ain't No Other Man"	Yes	Yes	Yes	Yes	Yes	76%	Saved
I	2	Gaya Shaki	"Dance Monkey"	Yes	Yes	Yes	Yes	Yes	91%	Advanced
II	3	Raviv Kaner	"Galim"	Yes	Yes	No	Yes	Yes	74%	Saved
II	4	Lali Kolishkin	"She Wolf (Falling to Pieces)"	Yes	Yes	Yes	Yes	Yes	88%	Advanced
III	5	Orr Amrami-Brockman	"Human"	No	Yes	Yes	Yes	Yes	81%	Advanced
III	6	Omer Eliyahu	"Tokho ratzuf ahava"	No	Yes	Yes	No	No	48%	Eliminated
IV	7	Ohad Shragai	"Dangerous Woman"	Yes	Yes	Yes	Yes	Yes	61%	Saved
IV	8	Moran Aharoni	"Stone Cold"	Yes	Yes	Yes	Yes	Yes	88%	Advanced
V	9	Eden Alene	"Locked Out of Heaven"	Yes	Yes	Yes	Yes	Yes	91%	Advanced

Heat 3 – Part 2 – 20 January 2020
Duel	Draw	Artist	Song	Judges' Vote					Score	Result
Duel	Draw	Artist	Song	A. Amdursky	Static & B. El Tavori	S. Maimon	M. Mesika	K. Peles	Score	Result
V	10	Dorel Saadon	"Titanium"	Yes	Yes	Yes	Yes	Yes	85%	Saved
VI	11	Loai Ali	"Iceland"	No	Yes	Yes	Yes	Yes	62%	Saved
VI	12	Ella-Lee Lahav	"Toxic"	No	Yes	Yes	Yes	Yes	80%	Advanced

====== Heat 4 – Idan Raichel special ======
In this round every contestant performed together with Idan Raichel who performed as an interval act during the Grand Final of the Eurovision Song Contest 2019.

Heat 4 – Part 1 – 23 January 2020
Group	Draw	Artist	Song	Judges' Vote					Score	Result
Group	Draw	Artist	Song	A. Amdursky	Static & B. El Tavori	S. Maimon	M. Mesika	K. Peles	Score	Result
1	1	Eden Alene	"Shoshanim atzuvot"	Yes	Yes	Yes	Yes	Yes	89%	Advanced
1	2	Orr Amrami-Brockman	"Ve'im tavo'i elay"	No	Yes	Yes	Yes	Yes	74%	Advanced
1	3	Ohad Shragai	"Mikol ha'ahavot"	No	Yes	Yes	No	Yes	56%	Advanced
1	4	Loai Ali	"She'eriot shel ha'chaim"	Yes	Yes	Yes	Yes	Yes	77%	Advanced
1	5	Lali Kolishkin	"Im hayita ro'eh"	Yes	Yes	No	Yes	Yes	78%	Advanced

Heat 4 – Part 2 – 25 January 2020
Group	Draw	Artist	Song	Judges' Vote					Score	Result
Group	Draw	Artist	Song	A. Amdursky	Static & B. El Tavori	S. Maimon	M. Mesika	K. Peles	Score	Result
2	6	Raviv Kaner	"Mima'amakim"	Yes	Yes	Yes	Yes	Yes	86%	Advanced
2	7	Eden Zohar Sivan	"La eternidad que se perdió"	Yes	Yes	Yes	Yes	Yes	76%	Saved
2	8	Moran Aharoni	"Ahava kazo"	Yes	Yes	Yes	Yes	Yes	85%	Advanced
2	9	Gaya Shaki	"Ulai hapa'am"	Yes	Yes	Yes	Yes	Yes	80%	Advanced
2	10	Ella-Lee Lahav	"Mechake"	Yes	Yes	Yes	Yes	No	83%	Advanced
1	11	Dorel Saadon	"Lifnei she'yigamer"	Yes	Yes	No	No	No	54%	Eliminated

====== Heat 5 ======
Heat 5 – Part 1 – 26 January 2020
Duel	Draw	Artist	Song	Judges' Vote					Score	Result
Duel	Draw	Artist	Song	A. Amdursky	Static & B. El Tavori	S. Maimon	K. Peles	I. Levi	Score	Result
I	1	Eden Alene	"Fuego"	Yes	Yes	Yes	Yes	No	79%	Saved
I	2	Raviv Kaner	"Human"	Yes	Yes	Yes	Yes	Yes	85%	Advanced
II	3	Ohad Shragai	"Feel"	No	Yes	Yes	Yes	Yes	73%	Saved
II	4	Lali Kolishkin	"I Lived"	Yes	Yes	Yes	Yes	No	80%	Advanced
III	5	Ella-Lee Lahav	"Kill This Love"	No	Yes	Yes	Yes	No	59%	Saved
III	6	Gaya Shaki	"Girls Just Want to Have Fun"	Yes	Yes	Yes	Yes	Yes	83%	Advanced
IV	7	Eden Zohar Sivan	"Shape of You"	No	No	No	Yes	No	44%	Eliminated

Heat 5 – Part 2 – 27 January 2020
Duel	Draw	Artist	Song	Judges' Vote					Score	Result
Duel	Draw	Artist	Song	A. Amdursky	Static & B. El Tavori	S. Maimon	K. Peles	I. Levi	Score	Result
IV	8	Orr Amrami-Brockman	"Sha'ar HaRahamim"	No	No	—	Yes	No	61%	Advanced
V	9	Loai Ali	"Shnei meshuga'im"	No	Yes	Yes	No	Yes	61%	Saved
V	10	Moran Aharoni	"Take Me to Church"	No	Yes	Yes	Yes	No	65%	Advanced

====== Quarter-final ======
Quarter-final – 30 January 2020
Group	Draw	Artist	Song	Judges' Vote					Score	Result
Group	Draw	Artist	Song	A. Amdursky	Static & B. El Tavori	S. Maimon	K. Peles	I. Levi	Score	Result
I	1	Lali Kolishkin	"Girl on Fire"	Yes	Yes	Yes	Yes	Yes	87%	Advanced
I	2	Eden Alene	"Yehefa"	No	Yes	Yes	Yes	Yes	78%	Advanced
I	3	Loai Ali	"Ya mama"	Yes	Yes	No	No	Yes	55%	Eliminated
II	4	Moran Aharoni	"Love On Top"	No	Yes	Yes	Yes	Yes	68%	Advanced
II	5	Orr Amrami-Brockman	"Aluf ha'Olam"	No	Yes	Yes	Yes	Yes	77%	Advanced
II	6	Raviv Kaner	"Always"	No	Yes	No	Yes	Yes	67%	Saved
III	7	Ohad Shragai	"Pe gadol"	Yes	Yes	Yes	Yes	Yes	69%	Saved
III	8	Ella-Lee Lahav	"Wild Enough"	Yes	Yes	Yes	Yes	Yes	83%	Advanced
III	9	Gaya Shaki	"idontwannabeyouanymore"	Yes	Yes	Yes	Yes	Yes	85%	Advanced

====== Semi-final 1 ======
Semi-final 1 – First Round – 1 February 2020
Duel	Draw	Artist	Song	Judges' Vote					Score	Result
Duel	Draw	Artist	Song	A. Amdursky	Static & B. El Tavori	S. Maimon	K. Peles	I. Levi	Score	Result
I	1	Ella-Lee Lahav	"Only Girl (In the World)"	Yes	Yes	Yes	Yes	Yes	91%	Second Round
I	2	Ohad Shragai	"The Logical Song"	No	Yes	Yes	Yes	Yes	60%	Eliminated
II	3	Lali Kolishkin	"Mirrors"	Yes	Yes	Yes	Yes	No	80%	Second Round
II	4	Eden Alene	"Hayi shketa"	No	Yes	No	No	Yes	64%	Saved

Semi-final 1 – Second Round
Draw	Artist	Song	Jury							Audience	Total	Result
Draw	Artist	Song	A. Amdursky	B. El Tavori	Static	S. Maimon	K. Peles	I. Levi	Total	Audience	Total	Result
5	Lali Kolishkin	"Writing's on the Wall"	12	8	8	10	8	8	54	18	72	Eliminated
6	Ella-Lee Lahav	"Royals"	10	12	10	8	12	12	64	20	84	Finalist
7	Eden Alene	"Listen"	8	10	12	12	10	10	62	22	84	Finalist

====== Semi-final 2 ======
Semi-final 2 – First Round – 2 February 2020
Duel	Draw	Artist	Song	Judges' Vote					Score	Result
Duel	Draw	Artist	Song	A. Amdursky	Static & B. El Tavori	S. Maimon	K. Peles	I. Levi	Score	Result
I	1	Raviv Kaner	"Hallelujah"	No	Yes	Yes	Yes	Yes	80%	Second Round
I	2	Gaya Shaki	"Wrecking Ball"	Yes	Yes	Yes	No	Yes	69%	Saved
II	3	Orr Amrami-Brockman	"Lech im ha'emet shelcha"	Yes	Yes	Yes	Yes	No	83%	Second round
II	4	Moran Aharoni	"Who You Are"	—	Yes	Yes	Yes	Yes	66%	Eliminated

Semi-final 2 – Second Round
Draw	Artist	Song	Jury							Audience	Total	Result
Draw	Artist	Song	A. Amdursky	B. El Tavori	Static	S. Maimon	K. Peles	I. Levi	Total	Audience	Total	Result
5	Raviv Kaner	"Gibor shel ima"	8	8	10	10	12	8	56	20	76	Eliminated
6	Gaya Shaki	"Love on the Brain"	12	12	8	8	8	12	60	18	78	Finalist
7	Orr Amrami-Brockman	"Zachiti le'ehov"	10	10	12	12	10	10	64	22	86	Finalist

====== Final ======
The final took place on 4 February 2020 and consisted of two rounds.

In the first round the four finalists were paired in two duels. From each duel the contestant with the higher score advanced to the second round. At the end of the first round, one of the remaining two contestants was saved by the viewers and the other contestant was eliminated.

The remaining three contestants were paired in a third duel in the second round. At the end of the duel, each judge allocated twelve points to their favourite, ten points to their runner-up and eight points to their least favourite. In addition to the votes of the judges, 300 points in proportion to the votes of the audience were also allocated to the three contestants. In the end, the contestant with the highest number of points won the competition.

Additionally, four thematical jury groups were asked to vote by the same method. The members of the four jury groups were:

- Group 1: Judges of the talent show Kokhav Nolad – Gal Uchovsky, Margalit Tzan'ani, Tzedi Tzarfati
- Group 2: Israeli representative and winner of the Eurovision Song Contest 2018 – Netta Barzilai
- Group 3: Composers of former Israeli Eurovision winning entries – Kobi Oshrat ("Hallelujah", 1979), Yoav Ginai, Svika Pick ("Diva", 1998)
- Group 4: Israeli composers – Stav Beger ("Toy", 2018), Jordi

Final – First Round – 4 February 2020
Duel	Draw	Artist	Song	Judges' Vote					Score	Result
Duel	Draw	Artist	Song	A. Amdursky	Static & B. El Tavori	S. Maimon	K. Peles	I. Levi	Score	Result
I	1	Eden Alene	"Where Have You Been"	No	Yes	Yes	Yes	Yes	66%	Saved
I	2	Orr Amrami-Brockman	"Aba"	No	Yes	Yes	Yes	Yes	73%	Second round
II	3	Ella-Lee Lahav	"Into You"	Yes	Yes	No	Yes	No	75%	Second round
II	4	Gaya Shaki	"My Immortal"	Yes	Yes	Yes	Yes	Yes	61%	Eliminated

Save by the viewers
Artist	Score	Result
Eden Alene	62%	Saved
Gaya Shaki	38%	Eliminated

Final – Second Round
Draw	Artist	Song	Jury	Viewers	Total	Place
1	Orr Amrami-Brockman	"Haim lhiot bah mehhoav"	98	60	158	3
2	Ella-Lee Lahav	"Roar"	92	90	182	2
3	Eden Alene	"Halo"	110	150	260	1

Detailed Jury Votes
Artist	HaKokhav HaBa Judges						Jury Groups				Total
Artist	A. Amdursky	Static	B. El Tavori	S. Maimon	K. Peles	I. Levi	Group 1	Group 2	Group 3	Group 4	Total
Orr Amrami-Brockman	8	8	8	10	12	10	10	10	10	12	98
Ella-Lee Lahav	12	10	10	8	8	8	8	12	8	8	92
Eden Alene	10	12	12	12	10	12	12	8	12	10	110

=== HaShir HaBa L'Eirovizion ===
The song that Alene would perform in the contest was decided by a separate national final, HaShir HaBa L'Eirovizion ("The Next Song for Eurovision"), featuring four songs. The songs' titles and their writing teams were announced on 27 February 2020. The show was held on 3 March 2020 and hosted by Lucy Ayoub. All songs were performed by Alene and the winner was chosen by a combination of the votes from two in-studio jury groups (10%), a professional jury (50%) and televoting (40%).

HaShir HaBa L'Eirovizion – 3 March 2020
Draw	Song	Songwriter(s)	Jury (60%)			Televote (40%)	Total	Place
Draw	Song	Songwriter(s)	Group 1	Group 2	Professional	Televote (40%)	Total	Place
1	"Savior in the Sound"	Oren Emanuel, Talia Londoner, Ori Avni	8	6	68	12	94	4
2	"Roots"	Nathan Goshen, Stav Beger	10	10	116	69	205	2
3	"Rakata" (רקטה)	Gal Jo Cohen, Eyal Yishay, Zlil Kalifi, Eran Kashi	6	12	68	53	139	3
4	"Feker Libi" (ፍቅር ልቤ)	Doron Medalie, Idan Raichel	12	8	108	154	282	1

== At Eurovision ==
According to Eurovision rules, all nations with the exceptions of the host country and the "Big Five" (France, Germany, Italy, Spain and the United Kingdom) are required to qualify from one of two semi-finals in order to compete for the final; the top ten countries from each semi-final progress to the final. The European Broadcasting Union (EBU) split up the competing countries into six different pots based on voting patterns from previous contests, with countries with favourable voting histories put into the same pot. On 28 January 2020, a special allocation draw was held which placed each country into one of the two semi-finals, as well as which half of the show they would perform in. Israel was placed into the first semi-final, to be held on 12 May 2020, and was scheduled to perform in the second half of the show. However, due to the COVID-19 pandemic, the contest was cancelled.
