= Unicorn (song) =

2023 song by Noa Kirel

Single by Noa Kirel
- Language: English; Hebrew
- Released: 8 March 2023
- Genre: Pop
- Length: 2:51
- Songwriters: Doron Medalie; May Sfadia; Yinon Yahel; Noa Kirel
- Producer: Yinon Yahel

Noa Kirel singles chronology
"Gone" (2023)	"Unicorn" (2023)	"Provocative" (2023)

Alternative cover
- Hope version cover

Music video
- "Unicorn" on YouTube "Unicorn" (Hope Version) on YouTube

Eurovision Song Contest 2023 entry
- Country: Israel

Finals performance
- Semi-final result: 3rd
- Semi-final points: 127
- Final result: 3rd
- Final points: 362

Entry chronology
- ◄ "I.M" (2022)
- "Hurricane" (2024) ►

Official performance video
- "Unicorn" (First Semi-Final) on YouTube "Unicorn" (Grand Final) on YouTube

"Unicorn" (Hebrew: חד קרן, had kran) is a song by Israeli singer-songwriter Noa Kirel. It was written by Kirel, Doron Medalie, May Sfadia, and Yinon Yahel. The song was released on 8 March 2023 through the Israeli Public Broadcasting Corporation (IPBC/Kan). The song represented Israel in the Eurovision Song Contest 2023, where it finished in third at the final with 362 points.

The song addresses antisemitism, xenophobia, and feminism, advocating for diversity, empowerment, Judaism, and the country of Israel. "Unicorn" received a mixed reception by both Israeli and international critics. While praise was given towards Kirel's vocals, its complex musical composition, and message, criticism was levied by some Israeli critics for sounding too familiar to other songs and its perceived generic nature. The song enjoyed commercial success, peaking at number one in its native country of Israel and within the top ten of a further three countries.

== Background and release ==
"Unicorn" was written and composed by Doron Medalie, May Sfadia, Yinon Yahel, and Noa Kirel. Initially, when asked to accept an invitation to represent Israel for the Eurovision Song Contest 2023 by the Israeli Public Broadcasting Corporation (IPBC/Kan), Kirel declined the offer, stating that she "felt unsure" and felt "very nervous" over Kan internally selecting their participant for that year. However, after she realised the potential possibility of achieving international fame if she placed high in the contest, she accepted the offer. After accepting, "Unicorn" took three days to write according to Medalie.

The title of the song, "Unicorn", was revealed on 17 January 2023. Before its release, a snippet of the song was leaked on 1 March and spread on WhatsApp and Telegram channels. "Unicorn" was officially released as a single on 8 March, correlating with International Women's Day. It premiered on Kan 11 during a special Eurovision broadcast hosted by Maya Wertheimer at the Dan Eilat Hotel.

== Composition ==
The mythological animal of a unicorn was selected by Kirel to represent Israel as a strong country due to the unicorn's strong nature.

The song has been described as a combination of pop and a ballad by varying media outlets. According to Kirel, she chose the symbol of a unicorn because while mythological, it "is very strong and stands with its horn outward to anyone coming — and I see [Israel] as such a strong country. There's something so innocent and pure about a unicorn, that in this period, we had to choose something that exists only in fairytales". Kirel later stated that the lyrics were meant to dissipate Israel's "negative image among much of the international community". The song advocates for female empowerment and Judaism, with Kirel stating that she wanted to put Judaism "in the forefront, but with class". In later interviews, Kirel also declared that the song advocated for "diversity and acceptance of others", denouncing xenophobia and antisemitism. She also has stated that the song supports one to follow their own passions.

In separate interviews, Medalie stated that he wrote the song to appeal to appease old and newer Eurovision fans, stating that the orchestral arrangement within the song "combines new worlds with old ones". He later added that "there are also Jewish elements that were incorporated through violins, even if it's only for us and only we will understand". Medalie also expressed in a controversial statement that he wanted to create a newer narrative of Israel, stating, "Our whole case in the world is that we are hated... there was a Holocaust, but it was 75-80 years ago, we can move forward to a new narrative. It's terribly boring."

== Music video and promotion ==
Along with the song's release, an accompanying music video directed by Indy Hait was released on the same day. The video was primarily recorded in Poland to better accommodate Hait, who lived in Kyiv. In an interview with Kan, Hait stated that the video was intended to be an inspiration towards all members of society despite their differences. Within the video, Kirel is shown scaling an upside-down ceiling compared to an orchestra, changes outfits numerous times, performs dance routines, and is briefly shown as a centaur.

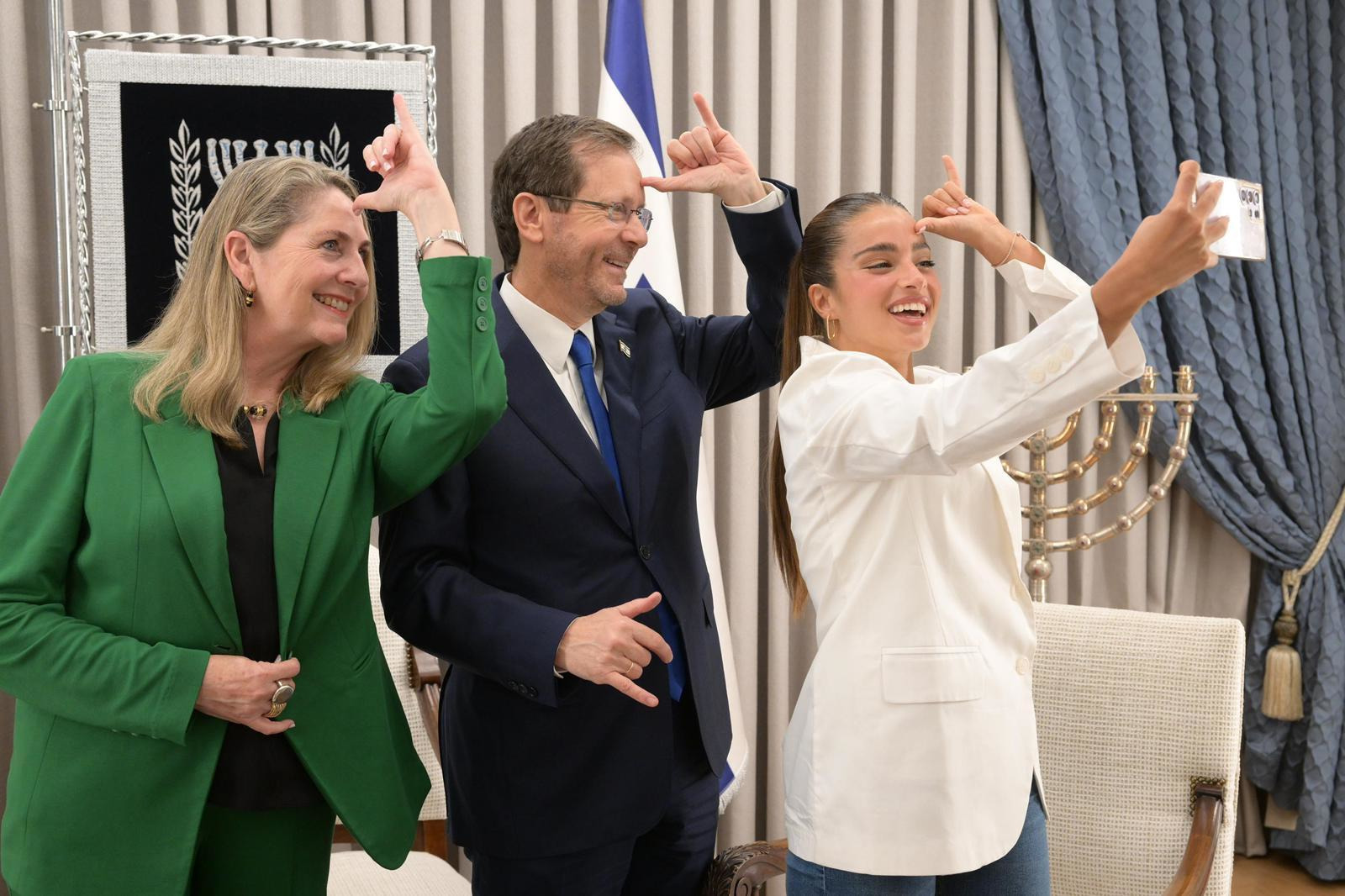
Kirel, Isaac Herzog, and Michal Herzog performing the "Unicorn" gesture in an Israeli government publicity photo.

Kirel participated in a variety of promotions to promote "Unicorn" before the Eurovision Song Contest. Before its release, on 2 March 2023, Kan released a television teaser promoting the song and its release. On the same day, Kirel launched the promotion of a TikTok dance challenge. On 21 April, Kirel made a one-off appearance at an OGAE Israel fan event. Six days later, Kirel made a press appearance with Isaac and Michal Herzog, the Israeli president and the first lady of Israel, respectively. The day before the 2023 Eurovision grand final, Kirel released a remixed version of "Unicorn" made by Israeli DJ Rotem Mansano, a victim of the Dizengoff Center suicide bombing, to honor him and his friend who died in the attack.

Numerous promotions spurred by Israeli companies and branches of international companies were made in the months leading into Eurovision. El Al, the flag carrier of Israel, offered to fly Kirel on a direct flight to Liverpool, in the process also changing their logo for the promotion. El Al later partnered with Kirel's team and the British and Ukrainian embassies in Israel to host a Eurovision Gala on 20 April 2023, with the gala featuring past Eurovision entrants and government officials. The Israeli branch of Coca-Cola released products featuring Kirel's likeness, producing a special can with a facsimile of Kirel's signature on it. Domino's Pizza Israel and the Strauss Group both released products featuring a unicorn to promote Kirel's song. The Israel Postal Company and city of Ra'anana, Kirel's hometown, changed their emblems to a unicorn to honor Kirel.

=== Hope version ===
Months after the contest, on 19 November 2023, Kirel released an acoustic version of the song titled as the "Hope Version" in response to the Gaza war. An accompanying music video was also released, featuring videos of Israel Defense Forces (IDF) soldiers, pro-Israel demonstrations, and Israeli hostages held by Hamas. In a statement given out by Kirel, she stated to Ynet that she "never thought that a few months later it would take on a completely different meaning", declaring that "in joy and sadness, we will stand strong against the world" for Israel's victory in the war.

=== In popular culture ===
"Unicorn" was used as part of a floor music composition by American gymnast Simone Biles for the 2023 artistic gymnastics season.

== Reception ==
=== Israeli media and personalities ===
"Unicorn" was met with mixed reactions amongst Israeli media outlets. The Jerusalem Post's Noa Feigenbaum declared the song to be a "powerful anthem for feminism and individuality", praising its lyrics, vocals, and message. Time Out's Omri Feinstein wrote that the song has a "boldness that comes from its unconventional structure", describing the song as a "poppy and addictive pleasure". Channel 13's Sam Messiah praised the song's mixture of multiple genres, comparing it to Netta Barzilai's "Toy", which won the Eurovision Song Contest 2018. Israeli music critic Yossi Khersonsky rated "Unicorn" four out of five stars, remarking that it had "clear musical characteristics of a universal hit. It sounds like it is made up of optimal mathematical patterns that set it up for success." Channel 12's Dor Meir Moalem praised the song's musical composition, declaring that it was "not an easy song to digest, and that is already a good thing". Numerous past Israeli Eurovision participants, including Gali Atari, Izhar Cohen, Moti Giladi, Lehakat Shiru, Dana International, and Michael Ben David praised the song.

Haaretz's Ben Shalu gave a mixed review, stating that while the song in general was "generic", it had a "nice flick-flack there, which touches both the almost contemporary pop of Sia and Rihanna and female power ballads from the 80s". Ynet's Einav Schiff wrote that the song had "considerable shortcomings"; while he praised the mixture of multiple genres, he criticised it for sounding too familiar to Loreen's "Euphoria" and David Bowie's "Life on Mars". He further went on to criticise Kirel's "lackluster" performance. Maariv's Dudi Patimer wrote that while the musical production, lyrics, and melody were invested, he admitted he was left disappointed by the song, writing that they were "no more catchy than a standard pop song in the usual homes".

=== International and Eurovision-related media ===
In a Wiwibloggs review containing several reviews from several critics, the song was rated 6.58 out of 10 points, earning 21st out of 37 songs on the site's annual ranking. Another review conducted by ESC Bubble that contained reviews from a combination of readers and juries rated the song eighth out of the 15 songs in the Eurovision semi-final "Unicorn" was in. ESC Beat's Doron Lahav ranked the song third overall, declaring it as "one of the catchiest songs of the year". Vulture's Jon O'Brien ranked the song ninth overall, stating that it traversed "dramatic neo-classical and playful tropical pop to thumping Eurohouse and frenetic K-pop over the course of three energetic minutes". BBC's Mark Savage called the song "a fun distraction", comparing it to a Katy Perry song that had "one too many vodka & Red Bulls". Kveller's Lior Zaltzman praised the song's lyrics, stating that they had a "camp, slightly confusing feel that many Eurovision songs have".

== Eurovision Song Contest ==
=== Internal selection and songwriting process ===
On 13 June 2022, the Israeli Public Broadcasting Corporation (IPBC/Kan) announced their intents to participate in the Eurovision Song Contest 2023, utilising an internal selection to select its participant; the first time Kan had chosen the method since 2014. A committee of ten people consisting of Ofri Gopher, Yuval Cohen, Kobi Nussbaum, Sharon Drix, Tali Katz, Tal Argaman, Yossi Gispan, Eden Darso, Avia Farchi, and Leon Feldman selected the artist out of 78 candidates. On 11 July, Kan announced that Kirel had won the internal selection; Kirel announced the following day that she was still considering the invitation, later stating that she felt nervous over accepting to perform in "such a big event". However, in early August, Israeli media reported that Kirel accepted the offer, with Kirel officially announcing her intent to compete on 10 August 2022. To write Kirel's song for the contest, a songwriting camp open to Israeli songwriters was formed, with Kirel being given artistic freedom from Kan. Although songwriters from other countries were invited, Kirel opted to work with an all-Israeli team to write the song.

=== At Eurovision ===
The Eurovision Song Contest 2023 took place at the Liverpool Arena in Liverpool, United Kingdom, and consisted of two semi-finals held on the respective dates of 9 and 11 May, and the final on 13 May 2023. During the allocation draw on 31 January 2023, Israel was drawn to compete in the first semi-final, performing in the second half of the show. Kirel was later drawn to perform eighth in the semi-final, ahead of Switzerland's Remo Forrer and before Moldova's Pasha Parfeni.

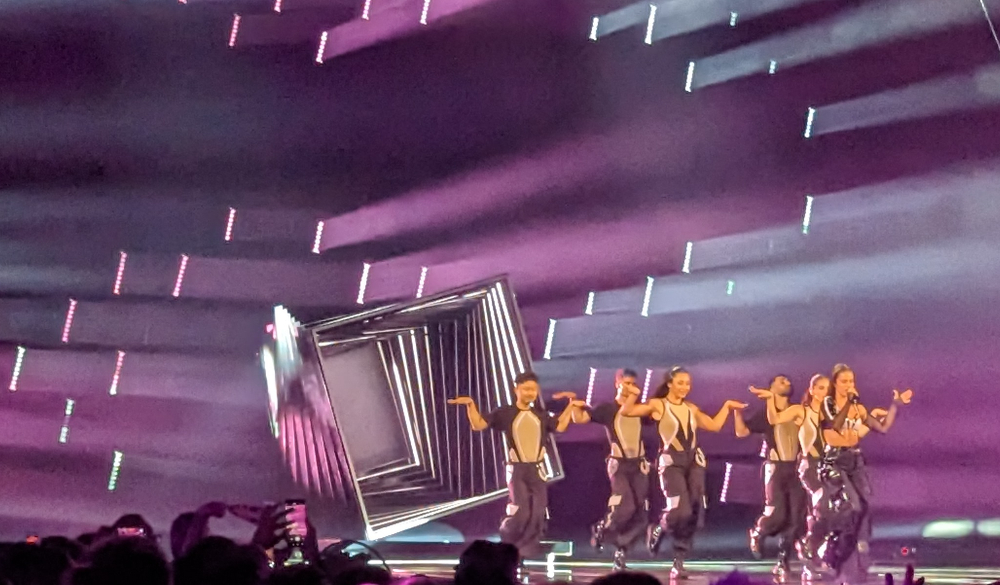
Kirel performing "Unicorn" at a Eurovision jury final.

For its Eurovision performance, Avichai Hacham was appointed as the staging director. The song was altered and made longer for Eurovision to accommodate Kirel's dance routine within the performance. The performance featured Kirel accompanied by five backing dancers consisting of Amit Gueta, Eden Shama, Niv Elbaz, Rephael Binyamin, and Zohar Fizitski. All six performers wore Alon Livne-designed outfits, with all wearing pink and black outfits. A large, square-shaped tunnel with white light is also featured within the performance. Nearing the end of the performance, Kirel performs a near half-minute dance routine where Kirel changes to a "minimalistic" outfit. It was described by Ynet's Ran Boker as a "wildly expressive dance. Alternating between rapid arm and leg movements and the occasional rolling on the ground, one might say it's reminiscent of breakdancing, but with a more contemporary twist." "Unicorn" finished in third, receiving 127 televoting points and securing a spot in the grand final.

Kirel performed a repeat of her performance in the grand final on 13 May 2023. The song was performed 23rd in the final, after Lithuania's Monika Linkytė and before Slovenia's Joker Out. After the results were announced, Kirel finished in third with 362 points, with a split score of 177 jury points and 185 televoting points. Regarding the former, the song received five sets of the maximum 12 points. It received a further four sets of 12 points in the public televote from three countries competing at Eurovision along with a "Rest of the World" combined vote from countries not competing at that year's Eurovision. After the contest, Kirel made a press appearance with Israeli prime minister Benjamin Netanyahu, who stated to Kirel during the appearance, "I think you should've won." In response to her result, Kirel expressed satisfaction, particularly that Poland's jury gave the song 12 points. Kirel, who had approximately 220 relatives killed by the Nazis at Auschwitz, stated that "receiving 12 points from Poland after what our people and my family have been through in the Holocaust [is] a true victory". The statement drew anger from some Polish politicians, including parliament member Anna Maria Żukowska and Polish deputy foreign minister Paweł Jabłoński. In response to the criticism, Kirel stated that her statement was "kind of taken out of context". She later accepted an offer from Jabłoński to visit Poland and to "discuss history, commemoration of the victims of [the] Holocaust and other WWII crimes, and also the future", according to Jabłoński.

== Commercial performance ==
"Unicorn" debuted at number 11 on the Israeli Media Forest chart dated 5 March 2023. After eight weeks on the chart, it peaked at number one on the chart dated 30 April 2023. Globally, the song has reached the top 10 in Finland, Greece, Iceland, and Lithuania, and peaked within the top 20 in Latvia. It has additionally appeared in the top 40 in Ireland, Norway, Poland, and Sweden.

== Track listing ==
Digital download/streaming

1. "Unicorn" – 2:51

Digital download/streaming – Rotem Mansano remix

1. "Unicorn (Rotem Mansano remix)" – 3:14

Digital download/streaming – Hope version

1. "Unicorn (Hope Version)" – 3:22

== Charts ==
Chart performance for "Unicorn"
Chart (2023)	Peak position
Austria (Ö3 Austria Top 40)	43
Czech Republic Singles Digital (ČNS IFPI)	84
Finland (Suomen virallinen lista)	10
Global Excl. US (Billboard)	153
Greece International (IFPI)	3
Iceland (Tónlistinn)	7
Ireland (IRMA)	37
Israel Airplay (Media Forest)	1
Latvia Streaming (LAIPA)	19
Lithuania (AGATA)	6
Netherlands (Single Top 100)	74
Norway (VG-lista)	30
Poland (Polish Streaming Top 100)	21
Sweden (Sverigetopplistan)	27
Switzerland (Schweizer Hitparade)	46
UK Singles (OCC)	45

== Release history ==
Release history and format for "Unicorn"
Country	Date	Format(s)	Version	Label	Ref.
Various	8 March 2023	Digital download; streaming	Single track	Israeli Public Broadcasting Corporation	
Various	12 May 2023	Digital download; streaming	Rotem Mansano remix	Self-released	
Various	19 November 2023	Digital download; streaming	Hope version	Self-released	
