= Set Me Free (Eden Alene song) =

2021 song by Eden Alene

Single by Eden Alene
- Released: 26 January 2021
- Genre: Dance-pop
- Length: 2:59
- Label: A.M Music
- Songwriters: Amit Mordechai; Ido Netzer; Noam Zlatin; Ron Carmi
- Producers: Amit Mordechai; Ido Netzer; Noam Zlatin

Eden Alene singles chronology
"Ue La La" (2021)	"Set Me Free" (2021)	"La La Love" (2021)

Music video
- "Set Me Free" on YouTube

Eurovision Song Contest 2021 entry
- Country: Israel
- Artist: Eden Alene
- Composers: Amit Mordechai; Ido Netzer; Noam Zlatin; Ron Carmi
- Lyricists: Amit Mordechai; Ido Netzer; Noam Zlatin; Ron Carmi

Finals performance
- Semi-final result: 5th
- Semi-final points: 192
- Final result: 17th
- Final points: 93

Entry chronology
- ◄ "Feker Libi" (2020)
- "I.M" (2022) ►

"Set Me Free" is a song by Israeli singer Eden Alene. The song represented Israel in the Eurovision Song Contest 2021 in Rotterdam, the Netherlands, after winning the pre-selection competition HaShir Shelanu L'Eurovizion. Its original version was released on 25 January 2021, accompanied by a music video on the official Eurovision YouTube channel.

On 26 March 2021, the song's new version was revealed, alongside a new music video. It was shot at Design City Centre in Mishor Adumim. The new version of the song notably includes a B6 whistle note, the highest note in the history of the Eurovision Song Contest.

== Eurovision Song Contest ==
The song represented Israel in the Eurovision Song Contest 2021, after it was chosen through HaShir Shelanu L'Eurovizion. On 17 November 2020, the EBU confirmed that the semi-final allocation draw for the 2021 contest would not be held. Instead, the semi-finals would feature the same line-up of countries as determined by the draw for the 2020 contest's semi-finals, which was held on 28 January 2020 at Rotterdam's City Hall. Israel performed 12th in the first semi-final and qualified to the grand final. In the final, Eden performed in the first half of the show.

== Arrangement ==
The song is widely considered to be highly energetic and catchy has stylistically been described as "bright", "bouncy, athletic [and] infectious", as well as having the qualities of pop music. Eden's vocal quality in the song was also highly praised.

== Personnel ==
Credits adapted from Tidal.

- Amit Mordechai – producer, composer, lyricist, arranger
- Ido Netzer – producer, composer, lyricist, arranger
- Noam Zaltin – producer, composer, lyricist, arranger
- Ron Carmi – producer, composer, lyricist, arranger

== Charts ==
Chart performance for "Set Me Free"
Chart (2021)	Peak position
Belgium (Ultratip Bubbling Under Flanders)	31
Greece International (IFPI)	68
Iceland (Tónlistinn)	38
Israel Airplay (Media Forest)	3
Lithuania (AGATA)	28
Netherlands (Single Top 100)	78
Sweden (Sverigetopplistan)	78
UK Singles Downloads (Official Charts)	100
