= Doron Medalie =

Israeli musical artist

Doron Medalie דורון מדלי
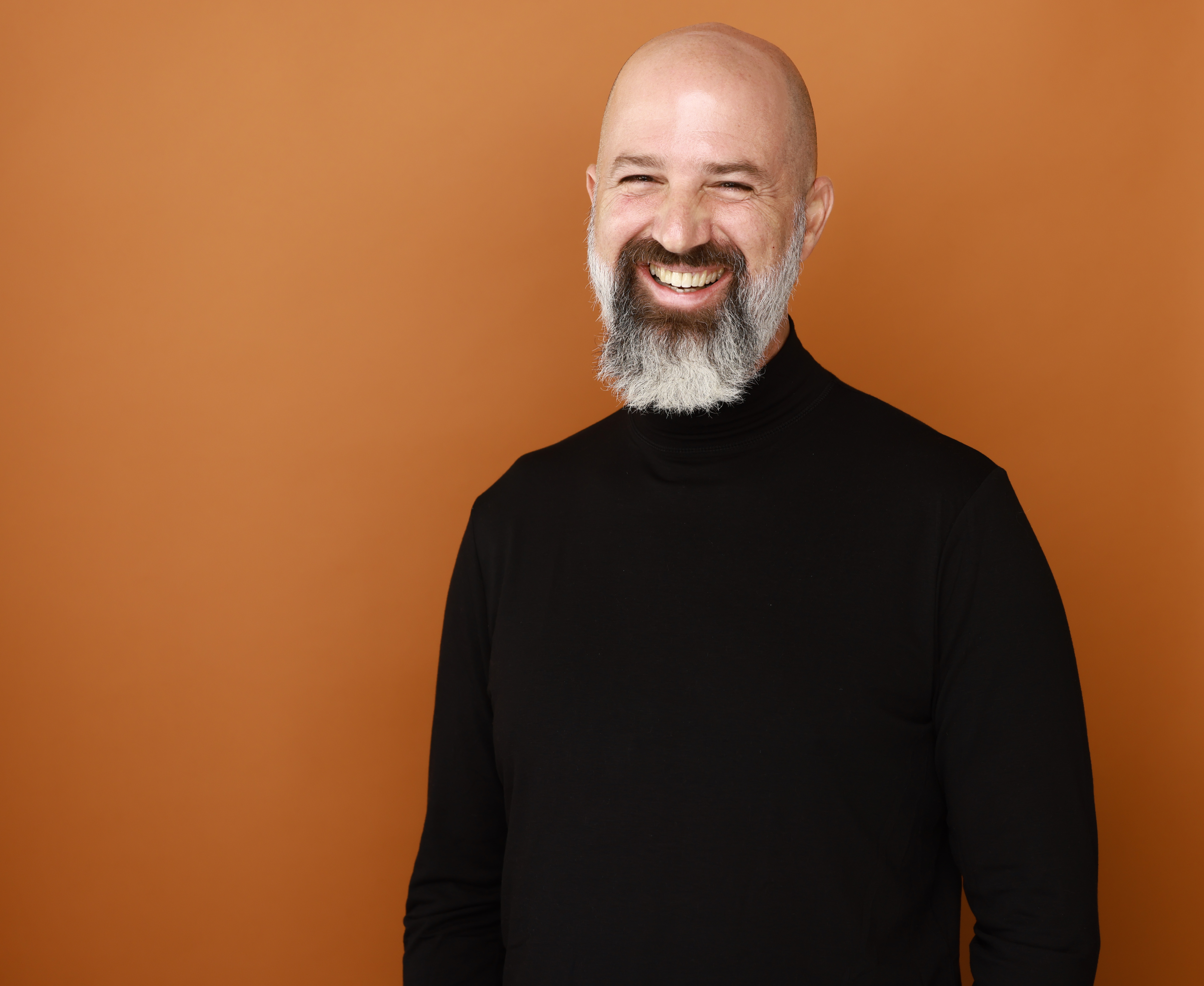

Background information
- Born: 5 December 1977 (age 48); Ramat Hasharon, Israel
- Genres: Pop, Mizrahi
- Years active: 2001–present

Doron Medalie (Hebrew: דורון מדלי; born 5 December 1977) is an Israeli songwriter, composer and artistic director. He co-wrote the song "Toy", which was performed by Netta Barzilai and won the Eurovision Song Contest 2018.

== Biography ==
Doron Medalie was raised in Ramat Hasharon. As a child he studied music and keyboards at the music school, theatre at the Habima national theatre and Alon performing-art high-school. Later on, he studied screen-acting at the Sharon Alexander studio, Flamenco dancing at the Compass dance company, and Gaga lessons at the Batsheva Dance Company with Ohad Naharin.

== Music career ==
Medalie has written over 500 songs, mostly in his Middle Eastern pop style, like the famous "Tel Aviv Ya Habibi Tel Aviv" - the official anthem of Tel Aviv Gay Pride 2013.

Medalie is also known for leading a big "Revolution Of Joy" in the Israeli music style, during the 2010s.

He has worked with top Israeli singers including Eyal Golan, Shlomi Shabat, Omer Adam, Lior Narkis, Moshe Peretz, Noa Kirel, Netta Barzilai and Harel Skaat. His solo album, Abyss, was released in 2008.

Medalie has created over 30 songs for the famous Israel's children show Festigal.

In 2019 he co-wrote with Idan Raichel "Shevet Achim Ve’Achayot", the official song for Israel's 70th anniversary.

Medalie has composed theme songs and soundtracks for many Israeli TV shows, including Goalstar, The Unit, Bolywood. Royal Chef, The Bachelor, Split. Zagury Empire, "ZIGI" and for Disney Israel, Summer Break Stories, North Star and Shavit Ventura Show.

Several of Medalie's songs were translated to Greek, sung by the Greek superstar Eleni Foureira, and became big hits in Greece and Cyprus.

Among his achievements are 3 ACUM awards (the Israeli songwriters association), 2 songs of the year, 2 songs of the decade, 4 most played songs on the public dance floor chart.

== Artistic director career ==
Medalie is the only songwriter (who is not a performing artist) to be a coach on The Voice Israel, 2019.

As an artistic director, he started his career in 2001, as an assistant director of Yaron Meiri's Orpan Group. Together they were in charge of more than 100 commercial-stage-shows. His breakthrough was as artistic manager of the talent shows A Star is Born and Eyal Golan Is Calling You.

Later on he was in charge of the casting of X FACTOR Israel (2021).

For more than 15 years, he directed the Israeli Music Awards (ACUM) and the national Memorial Day ceremony.

== Views and opinions ==
He said that the lyrics of the 2018 Eurovision-winning song "Toy" were inspired by the #MeToo movement, and that the song carries a message about "the awakening of female power and social justice".

== Eurovision Song Contest ==
Medalie participated at the Eurovision song contest 8 times, as an artistic member of the Israeli delegation.

He directed the Israeli entry for the Eurovision three times (Boaz Ma'uda - 2008, Harel Skaat - 2010, Moran Mazor - 2013).

He wrote and composed the Israeli entries for Eurovision 2015 - "Golden Boy" (Nadav Guedj), which ended 3rd in the semi-finals and was awarded a spot in the final on 23 May 2015, ending in 9th place with 97 points. The song achieved "the Israeli song of the year" award.

For Eurovision 2016 - "Made of Stars" (Hovi Star) ended 7th in the semi-finals and was awarded a spot in the final on 14 May 2016, where it ended 14th with 135 points.

Doron collaborated with Zvika Pick; together they wrote "Sing My Song" for Sofia Nizharadze (Eurovision pre-selection Georgia, 2010).

For the Eurovision Song Contest 2018, he composed the music and wrote the lyrics together with composer Stav Beger for the winning song "Toy", sung by Netta Barzilai.

In 2020, he co-wrote with Idan Raichel the song "Feker Libi", which was sung by Eden Alene and would have represented Israel in the Eurovision Song Contest 2020, before the event was cancelled due to the COVID-19 pandemic.

In 2023, he co-wrote the song "Unicorn", sung by Noa Kirel (music & lyrics by: May Sfadia, Yinon Yahel, Noa Kirel and Doron Medalie).

== Notable songs ==
- Shlomi Shabat – "Aba", "Bereshit Olam"
- Eyal Golan – "Im yesh gan eden"
- Omer Adam – "Tel Aviv", "Why li", "Baniti allayich", "Names mimech", "temperatura" and many more
- Lior Narkis – "Shaga'at-Tarefet", "Mahapecha shel simcha", "Amalia"
- Harel Skaat – "21st century", "La’uf"
- Maya Buskila – "Nishmati"
- Nadav Guedj – "Golden Boy"
- Hovi Star – "Made of Stars"
- Eleni Foureira – "Sto Theo me paei" (Cover of Golden Boy), "Ti koitas", "Caramela", "Temperatura"
- Netta Barzilai – "Toy"
- Moshe Peretz - "Caramela"
- Artists of Israel – "Shevet Achim Ve’achayot"
- Indira Levak – "You Will Never Break My Heart"
- Milica Pavlović – "Riba de luxe"
- Noa Kirel – "Unicorn"

== See also ==
- Music of Israel
- Television in Israel
