= Kobi Marimi =

Israeli singer

Kobi Marimi קובי מרימי
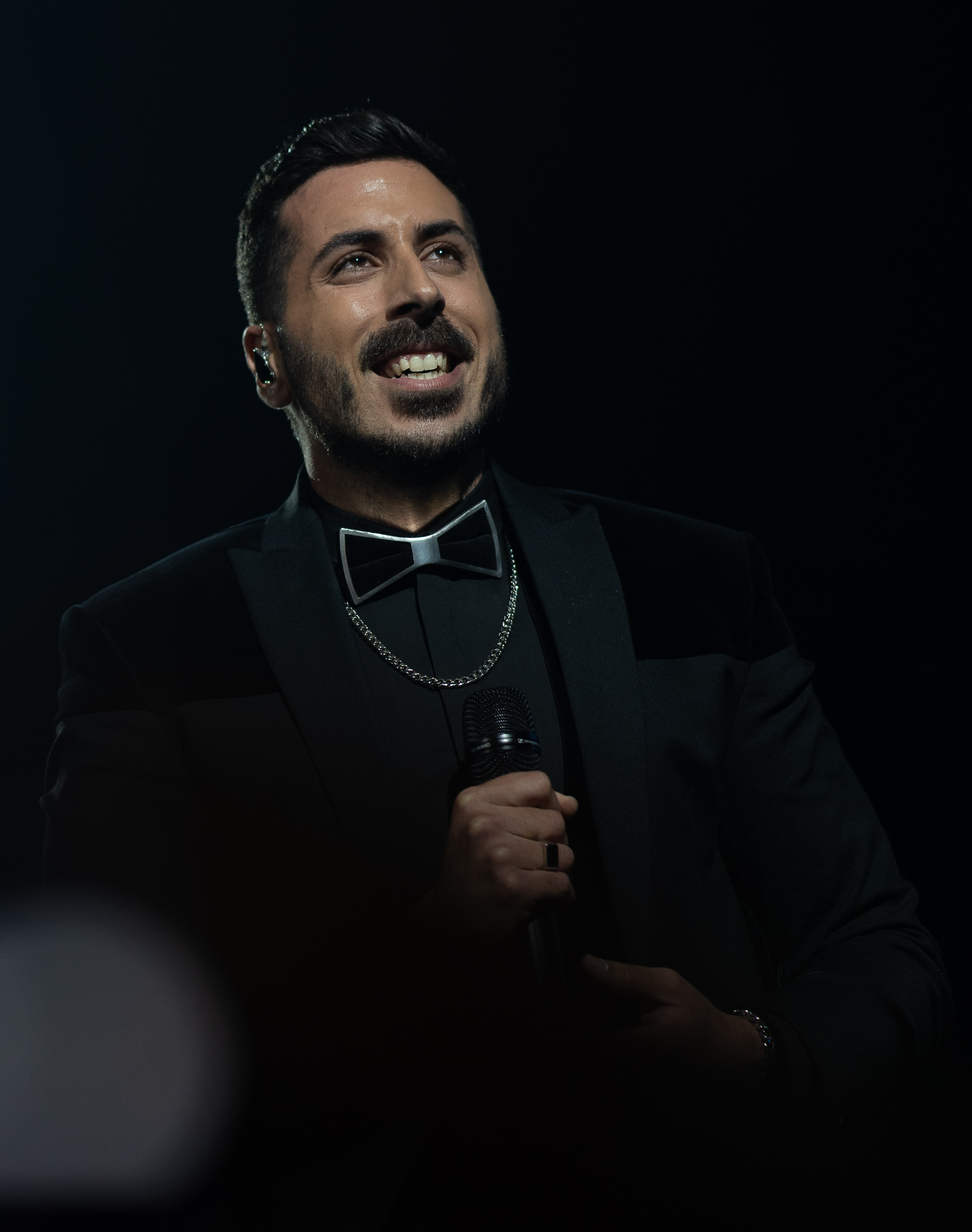
- Marimi in 2019

Background information
- Born: Yaakov Marimi; October 8, 1991 (age 35); Ramat Gan, Israel
- Genre: Pop
- Occupations: Singer; actor
- Instruments: Vocals
- Years active: 2017–present

Yaakov "Kobi" Marimi (Hebrew: קובי מרימי; born October 8, 1991) is an Israeli singer and actor. Having won the sixth season of the singing competition HaKokhav HaBa, he represented Israel in the Eurovision Song Contest 2019 with the song "Home", finishing 23rd in the final.

== Biography ==
Yaakov (Kobi) Marimi was born and raised in Ramat Gan, Israel, to Dalit and Eli Marimi. After studying at Ohel Shem high school, he did his military service in the Israel Defense Forces (IDF) in the Adjutant Corps. He studied in the Nissan Nativ Acting Studio. Marimi resides in Tel Aviv. He has worked as a pub host and movie theater cashier.

== Career ==
=== Theatre ===
During his studies he appeared in the plays The Caucasian Chalk Circle, The Comic Illusion and Prayer. After graduating from Nissan Nativ, he performed in Every Living Thing Needs and Chambaloo's Treasure, and made his Israeli Opera debut as Natan in Messiah Now, for which he won the Promising Actor Award at the 2017 Musical Celebrations in Bat Yam.

=== HaKokhav HaBa and Eurovision ===
Marimi won the sixth season of HaKokhav HaBa. This earned him the right to represent his country in the Eurovision Song Contest 2019 on home soil in Tel Aviv. His entry, "Home", was chosen from about 200 submitted songs; it was written by Inbar Weitzman and Ohad Shragai. It finished 23rd of 26 in the final. Israel's score was later revised to 35 points, all from the televote, after the European Broadcasting Union withdrew the 12 points awarded to Israel by the Belarusian jury because of an error in the aggregated result; Israel's placing was unchanged.

=== Later career ===
In June 2019, Marimi joined Habima Theatre, Israel's national theatre, to star in its production of Spring Awakening.

In September 2019, he released "Yalla Bye", his first song after Eurovision, which he co-wrote with Gal Gio Cohen and Eyal Yishai. It was followed in January 2020 by the ballad "Lo Levad" ("Not Alone"). In August 2021 he released "Yotze MiZeh" ("Getting Out of It").

In December 2025, Marimi suggested in a social media video that "Home", which had been chosen for him by a professional committee, had harmed his career.

== Discography ==
=== Singles ===
| Title | Year | Peak chart positions | Album |
| Title | Year | ISR | Album |
|---|---|---|---|
| "Home" | 2019 | 2 | —N/a |
| "Yalla Bye" | 2019 | 1 | —N/a |
| "Lo Levad" | 2020 | 16 | —N/a |
| "Yotze MiZeh" | 2021 | — | —N/a |

Awards and achievements
| Preceded by Netta | HaKokhav HaBa winner 2019 | Succeeded by Eden Alene |
| Preceded by Netta with "Toy" | Israel in the Eurovision Song Contest; 2019 | Succeeded by Eden Alene with "Feker Libi" |
