= Eden Alene =

Israeli singer (born 2000)

Eden Alene עדן אלנה ኤደን አለነ
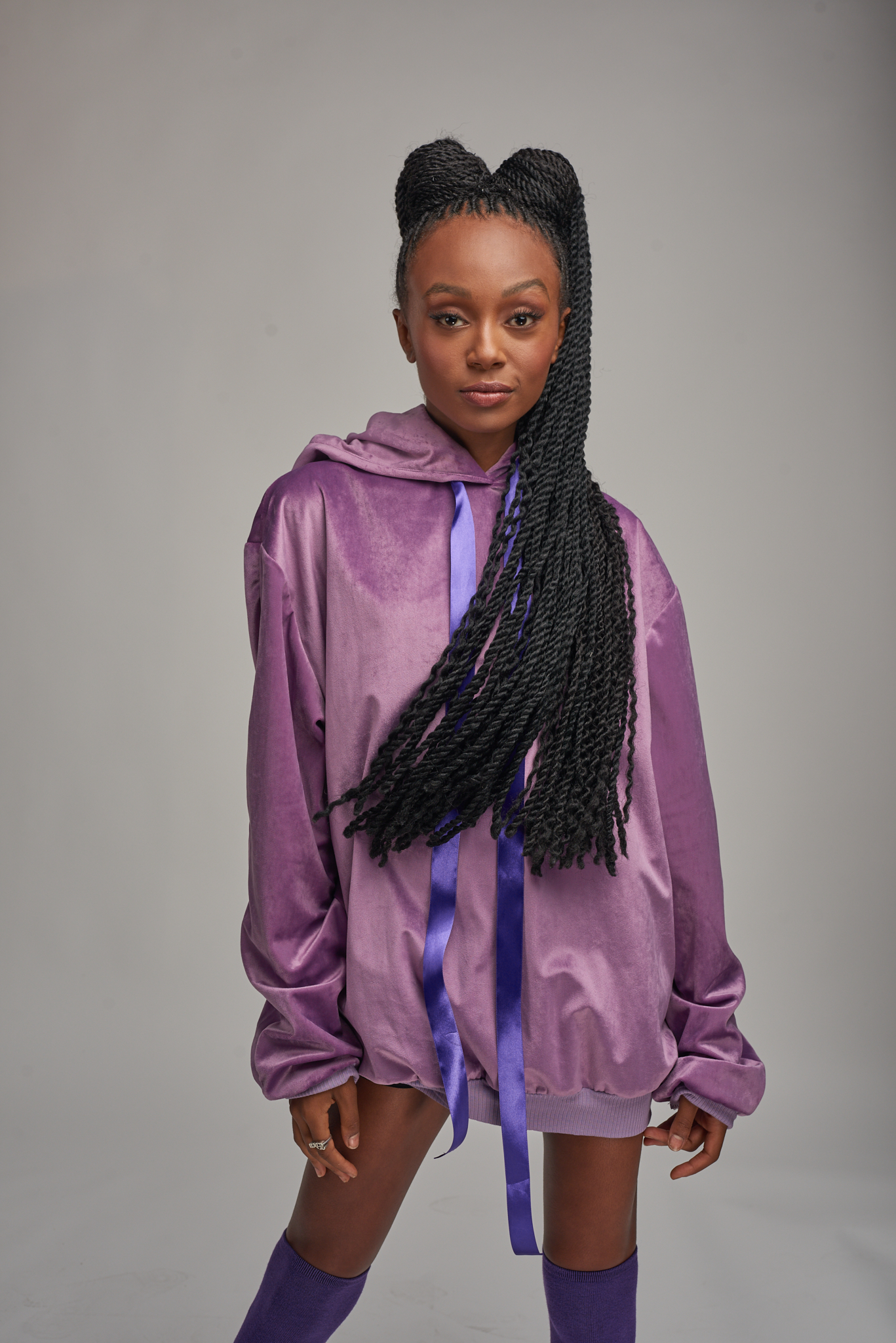
- Alene in 2021

Background information
- Born: 7 May 2000 (age 25); Jerusalem, Israel
- Genres: R&B; soul; pop
- Occupation: Singer
- Instrument: Vocals
- Years active: 2017–2022 (Note: Indefinite hiatus)
- Labels: Aroma

Eden Alene (Hebrew: עדן אלנה, pronounced [ˈʔeden ʔaˈlene]; Amharic: ኤደን አለነ, romanized: Edäni Älänä; born 7 May 2000) is an Israeli former singer. Having won the seventh season of the singing competition HaKokhav HaBa, she represented Israel in the Eurovision Song Contest 2021 with her song "Set Me Free", finishing in 17th place.

== Early and personal life ==
Alene was born in the neighborhood of Katamon in Jerusalem, to Ethiopian-Jewish parents who immigrated separately to Israel during the aliyah from Ethiopia. When she was two years old her parents divorced. Since then, she has not been in contact with her father.

Alene attended religious Jewish elementary school and middle school, but she later transitioned to a secular Jewish high school of Hebrew University Secondary School where she pursued a major in theatre.

She was enlisted in October 2018 as a soldier in to the Israel Defense Forces (IDF), and served in the military band of the Education and Youth Corps. She received an honorable discharge in October 2020.

She was in a relationship with Yonatan Gabay. The two broke up in February 2022.

As of 2024, Alene has stopped working in the music industry and currently works as a hostess in a restaurant in Tel Aviv.

== Career ==
In October 2017, Alene was a contestant in the third season of the singing competition The X Factor Israel. She auditioned with the song "Stone Cold" by Demi Lovato. In January 2018, she won the season finale.

In April 2018, she performed a song by Arkadi Duchin at the torch-lighting ceremony that opened the celebrations of the 70th anniversary of the establishment of the State of Israel. In December 2018, she released her debut single "Better". In 2019, she took part in an Israeli production of the musical Little Shop of Horrors.

In February 2019, ahead of the Eurovision Song Contest 2019 held in Tel Aviv, Alene released a cover of the song "Save Your Kisses for Me" by Brotherhood of Man, which won the Eurovision Song Contest 1976. In March 2019, she released her second single, "When It Comes to You", which was produced by American producer Julian Bunetta.

=== Eurovision Song Contest ===
In 2019, she participated in the seventh season of the Israeli singing competition Rising Star (HaKokhav HaBa), achieving first place on 4 February 2020. As the winner, she was supposed to represent Israel in the Eurovision Song Contest 2020 to be held in Rotterdam, Netherlands. The four finalist songs for her were "Savior in the Sound", "Roots", "Rakata" and "Feker Libi". Eventually the song "Feker Libi" was picked, which contains four languages English, Arabic, Hebrew and Amharic. However, on 18 March 2020, the event was cancelled due to the COVID-19 pandemic.

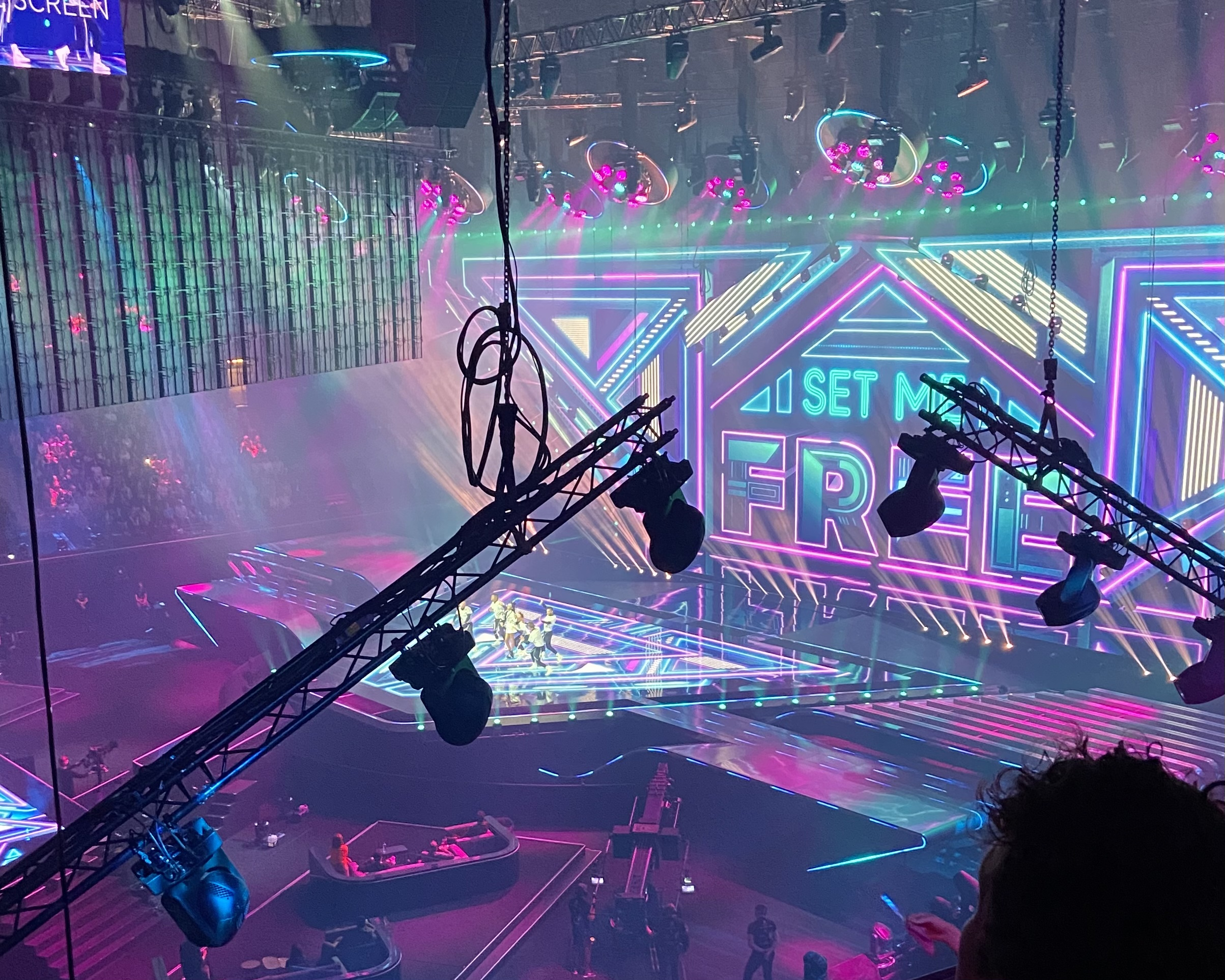
Performing in the 1st Semi final Jury Show

On 22 March 2020, it was announced that she had been internally chosen to represent Israel in the Eurovision Song Contest 2021. In January 2021, her three songs one of which is the candidate for the final are "Ue La La", "La La Love" and "Set Me Free". Eventually, on 25 January 2021, the song "Set Me Free" was picked.

On 18 May 2021, she performed 12th during the first semi-final, following Belgium and preceding Romania. She qualified to the final on 22 May. In addition to that, she broke the all-time record for the highest note in Eurovision history, hitting a B6 whistle note during the first semi-final of Eurovision 2021. In the final, she scored 93 points, finishing 17th out of 26.

== Discography ==
=== Extended plays ===
Title	Details
HaShir HaBa L'Eurovizion	Released: 27 February 2020; Label: Aroma Music, Tedy Productions; Format: Streaming, digital download

=== Singles ===
Title	Year	Peak chart positions				Album
Title	Year	ISR Air.	NLD	SWE	UK Down.	Album
"Better"	2018	10	—	—	—	Non-album singles
"Save Your Kisses for Me"	2019	—	—	—	—	Non-album singles
"When It Comes to You"	2019	—	—	—	—	Non-album singles
"Feker Libi"	2020	3	—	—	—	HaShir HaBa L'Eurovizion
"Ma Ata Over"	2020	—	—	—	—	Non-album singles
"Set Me Free"	2021	3	78	78	100	Non-album singles
"Ue La La"	2021	—	—	—	—	Non-album singles
"La La Love"	2021	—	—	—	—	Non-album singles
"LaKum"	2021	—	—	—	—	Non-album singles

== Notes ==
Awards and achievements
Preceded by Daniel Yafe	The X Factor Israel winner 2017–18	Succeeded by Michael Ben David
Preceded by Kobi Marimi	HaKokhav HaBa winner 2020	Succeeded by Tamir Grinberg
Preceded by Kobi Marimi with "Home"	Israel in the Eurovision Song Contest; 2020 (cancelled)	Succeeded by Herself with "Set Me Free"
Preceded by Herself with "Feker Libi"	Israel in the Eurovision Song Contest; 2021	Succeeded by Michael Ben David with "I.M"
