= Ella-Lee Lahav =

Israeli singer (born 2003)

Ella-Lee Lahav אלה־לי להב
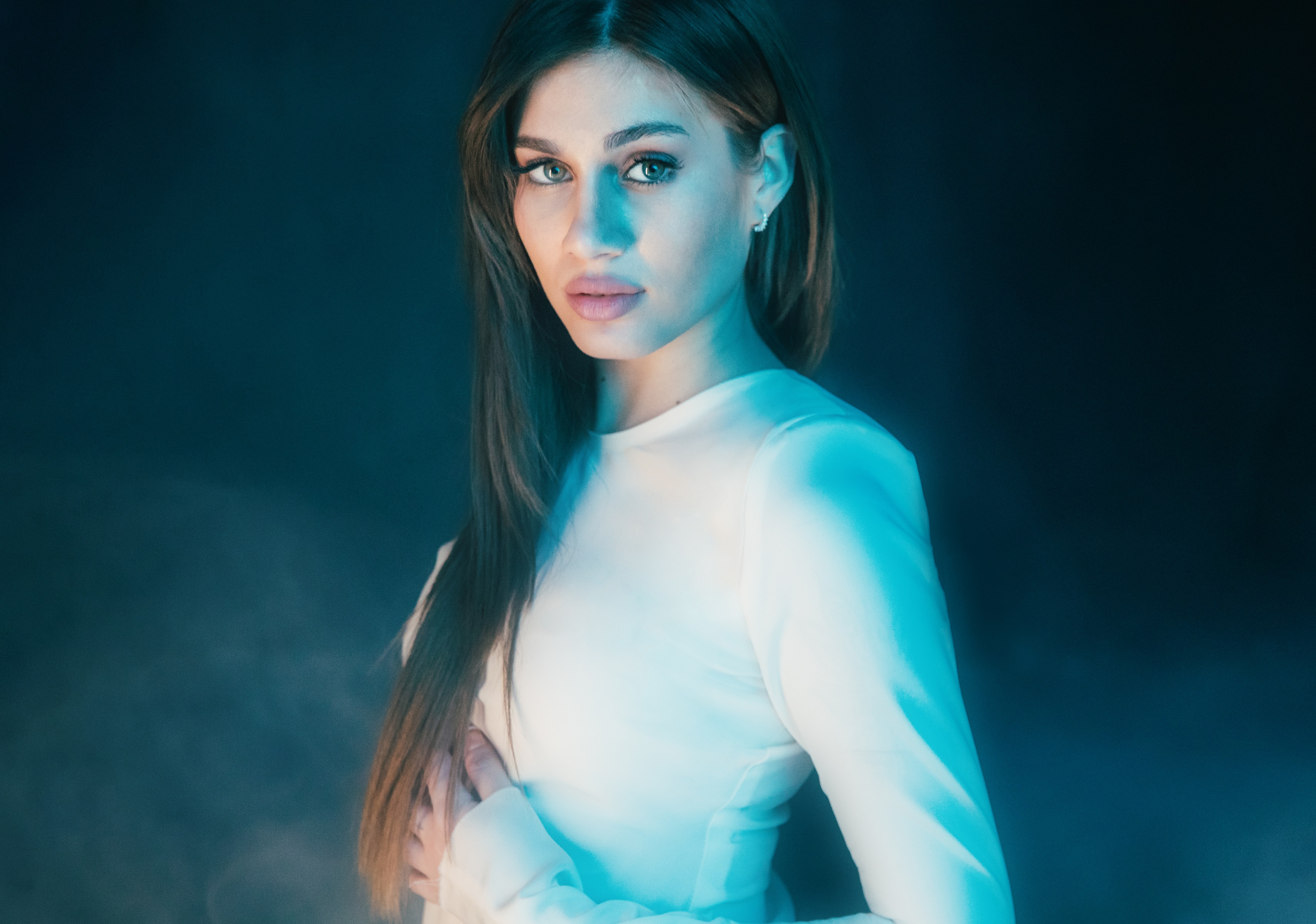
- Ella-Lee Lahav in 2023

Background information
- Also known as: Ella-Lee
- Born: Ella Lahav; 2 June 2003 (age 23); Shoham, Israel
- Genres: Pop; K-pop
- Occupation: Singer
- Instrument: Vocals
- Years active: 2019–present
- Label: Tedy Productions

Ella-Lee Lahav (Hebrew: אלה־לי להב; born 2 June 2003), known as Ella-Lee, is an Israeli singer. In 2019 she became famous following her second place at the seventh season of Israel's HaKokhav HaBa LaErovizion (Rising Star to the Eurovision), the Israeli national selection for the Eurovision Song Contest 2020. In June 2020, on her 17th birthday, she released her debut single "Zot Ani", the single was ranking high on the Apple UK playlist and topped the Media Forest airplay chart.

== Early life ==
Ella Lahav was born and raised in Shoham, Israel, to a family of Ashkenazi Jewish descent. Her parents are Yannai and Hagit, and she has two sisters.

Towards an appearance in television singing competition she changed her first name from Ella to Ella-Lee, after consultation with a numerologist.

In February 2022, she was enlisted to the Israel Defense Forces.

In February 2024, she had completed her military service and posted the celebration on Instagram.

== Career ==
=== 2019–2020: HaKokhav HaBa LaErovizion (Rising Star to the Eurovision) ===
In 2019, she auditioned for the seventh season of the Israeli singing competition Rising Star to the Eurovision (HaKokhav HaBa LaErovizion), Israel's national selection for the European Eurovision Song Contest, with "You Don't Own Me" by Saygrace. After receiving 96% of the votes, she advanced to the second stage of the competition in which she sang "Into You" by Ariana Grande. In January 2020, she performed "Hey Mama" by David Guetta and won a duel with Nicky Goldstein. After that, she performed a duet with Orr Amrami Brockman to "Señorita" by Shawn Mendes and Camila Cabello and got many praises from the judges and audience. In semi-final she performed "Only Girl (In the World)" and "Royals".

The last song Lahav performed in the competition was "Roar" by Katy Perry. After receiving 182 points from the judges and audience, Lahav won the second place, losing to Eden Alene.

=== 2020: Debut single and other projects ===
In March 2020, she appeared with fellow runner up of HaKokhav HaBa Orr Amrami Brockman in an advertising to Israeli telecommunications company Bezeq, along with the presenter of the company commercials, Israeli singer Gidi Gov. In April she performed with Amrami Brockman in Israel Independence national ceremony, held in Mount Herzl.

On 2 June 2020, her 17th birthday, she released her debut single "Zot Ani", produced by Johnny Goldstein. Just days after its release, the single became hit by reaching the top of Media Forest's airplay chart and ranking high on the Apple Music UK playlist Glitch.

On 15 November 2020, she released a second single titled "Ma Atta Rotse?".

In 2022 she played at the teen Israeli series "שומקום (סדרת טלוויזיה)" on TeenNick. There she met Philipp Shaulov, her ex-boyfriend.

== Personal life ==
In October 2020, she said in an interview about her sexual orientation: "I don't define myself, I can fall in love with a woman, I can fall in love with a man".

In 2021, she was in a relationship with Maya Geris, a female Israeli-Dutch social media celebrity of Arab and Jewish descent. From 2022 to 2024, she was in a relationship with male Israeli actor Philipp Shaulov.

== Discography ==
=== Charted singles ===
List of charted singles as lead artist, showing album name and year released
Title	Year	Peak chart positions		Album
Title	Year	ISR	ISR Dom. Air.	Album
"Zot Ani"	2020	*	1	Non-album single
"Ma Ata Rotse?"	2020	*	1	Non-album single
"Lechagog Umagog" (with Shahar Saul and HaPshuta)	2023	53	18	Non-album single
"—" denotes items which were not released in that country or failed to chart. "*" denotes that the chart did not exist at that time.
