= Feker Libi =

2020 song by Eden Alene

Single by Eden Alene

from the EP HaShir HaBa L'Eurovizion
- Language: English; Amharic; Hebrew; Arabic
- English title: My Beloved
- Released: 3 March 2020
- Recorded: February 2020
- Genre: Dance-pop; Afrobeat
- Length: 3:04
- Label: Tedy Productions; AM Productions
- Songwriters: Doron Medalie; Idan Raichel
- Producers: Yinon Yahel; Idan Raichel

Eden Alene singles chronology
| "When It Comes to You" (2019) | "Feker Libi" (2020) | "Ma Ata Over" (2020) |

Music video
- "Feker Libi" on YouTube

Eurovision Song Contest 2020 entry
- Country: Israel
- Artist: Eden Alene
- Languages: English, Amharic, Hebrew, Arabic
- Composers: Doron Medalie; Idan Raichel
- Lyricists: Doron Medalie; Idan Raichel

Finals performance
- Semi-final result: Contest cancelled

Entry chronology
- ◄ "Home" (2019)
- "Set Me Free" (2021) ►

"Feker Libi" (Amharic: ፍቅር ልቤ, lit. 'My beloved') is a song recorded by Israeli singer Eden Alene, performed in English, Amharic, Hebrew and Arabic. It was planned to represent Israel in the Eurovision Song Contest 2020. It would have been the first Eurovision entry to contain lyrics in Amharic.

== Eurovision Song Contest ==
The song was released as a single on March 3, 2020. It was set to represent Israel in the Eurovision Song Contest 2020, after Eden Alene was selected through HaKokhav HaBa L'Eurovizion, the music competition that selects Israel's entries for the Eurovision Song Contest. On January 28, 2020, a special allocation draw was held which placed each country into one of the two semi-finals, as well as which half of the show they would perform in. Israel was placed into the first semi-final, to be held on 12 May 2020, and was scheduled to perform in the second half of the show. However, the contest was later cancelled due to the COVID-19 pandemic.

== Credits and personnel ==
Credits adapted from YouTube.

- Eden Alene – vocals
- Doron Medalie – backing vocals, songwriting
- Idan Raichel – songwriting, production, keyboards
- Yinon Yahel – production, keyboards, programming, mixing, mastering
- Ronen Hilel – recording engineer
- Ofek Ariov – engineer assistant
- Omri Bar Hod – programming
- Rudi Bainesay – backing vocals

== Track listing ==
Digital download
| No. | Title | Length |
|---|---|---|
| 1. | "Feker Libi" | 3:04 |

== Charts ==
Weekly chart performance for "Feker Libi"
| Chart (2020) | Peak position |
|---|---|
| Israel Airplay (Media Forest) | 3 |

== See also ==
- Music of Israel
