= Liora Itzhak =

Israeli singer of Indian origin (born 1974)

Liora Itzhak (Pezarkar) ליאורה יצחק (פזרקר)
- Born: September 27, 1974 (age 51); Lod, Israel
- Genres: Pop; Mizrahi; Indian
- Occupation: Singer
- Years active: 2013–present

Liora Itzhak (Pezarkar) (Hebrew: ליאורה יצחק; born 27 September 1974) is an Israeli singer of Indian origin. She was born in Israel to parents who had made aliyah from Mumbai, India. During Indian Prime Minister Narendra Modi's 2017 visit to Israel, she sang Hatikvah and Jana Gana Mana – the national anthem of Israel and India respectively.

== Early life ==
Born in Lod to Indian Jewish (Bene Israel) parents from the state of Gujarat, Itzhak moved to India at the age of 16, returning to Israel eight years later. In India, she attended the Sur Sarvadhan Institute in Pune, where she learned music from Pandit Suresh Talwalkar and his wife, as well as from Ramesh Nadkarni.

== Career ==
Itzhak cites Bappi Lahiri as one of her influences, who gave her a chance at a music career. While living in India, she sang with several famous singers, such as Kumar Sanu and Udit Narayan. She performed in the Bollywood film Dil Ka Doctor.

In Israel, she collaborated with Israeli psytrance artist Blastoyz, singer Yoav Itzhak. In 2015, she performed at a state banquet in honor of Indian President Pranab Mukherjee's visit to Israel. In 2017, she performed at the annual Israel Festival in Jerusalem. Her first album, Mala Mala, was popular in Israel and India.

== Personal life ==
She is married and has 2 children.
