= Yinon Yahel =

Israeli music producer and DJ (born 1978)

Yinon Yahel ינון יהל
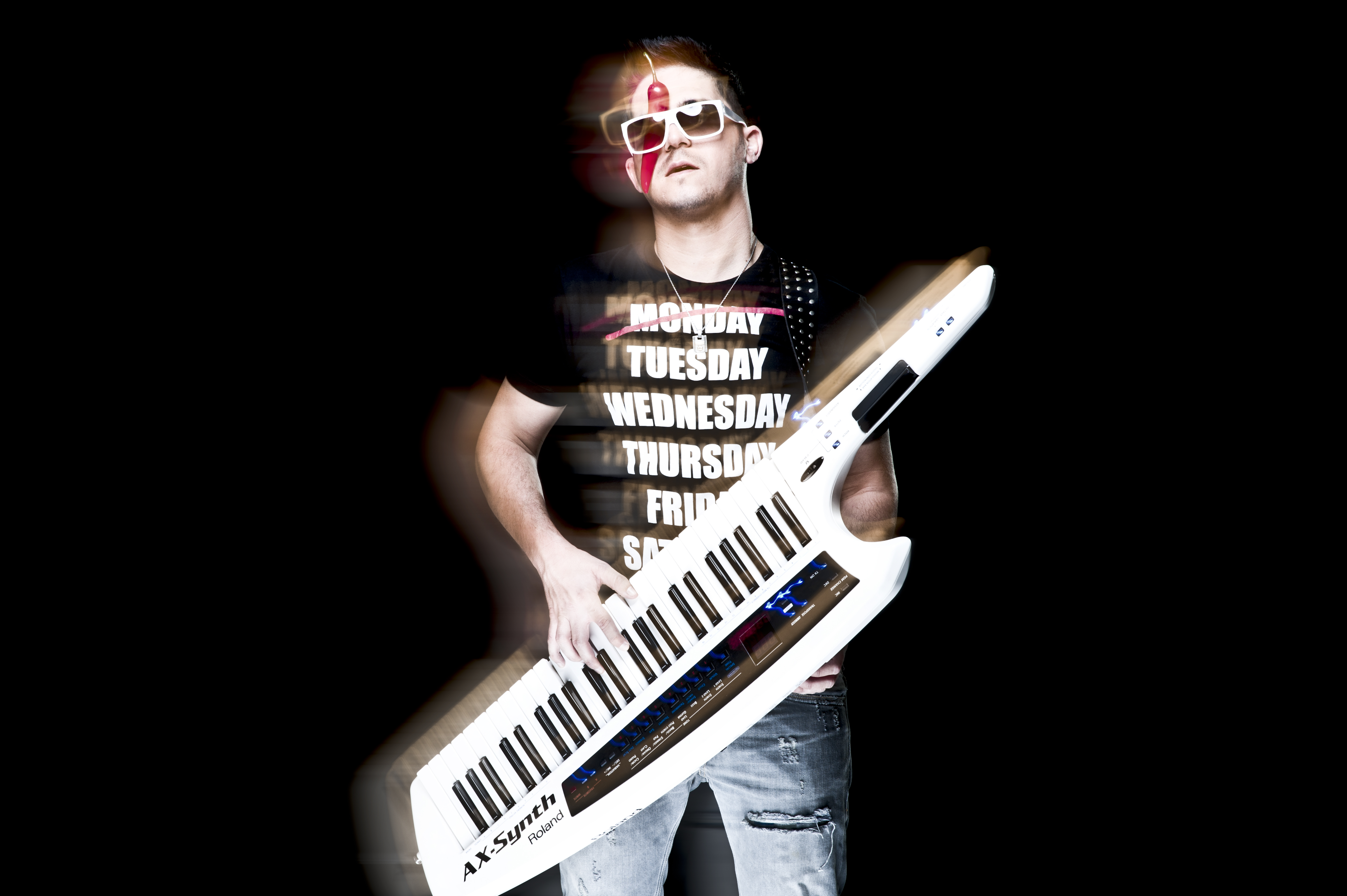
- Yahel in 2010

Background information
- Born: 26 August 1978 (age 47)
- Origin: Israel
- Genres: Pop; EDM; world music; house; Mizrahi music; folk
- Occupations: Record producer; DJ; remixer; songwriter; audio engineer
- Instruments: Keyboards; synthesizer; piano; guitar; drums; percussion
- Years active: 1993–present
- Formerly of: Eman
- Website: yinonyahel.com

Yinon Yahel (Hebrew: ינון יהל; born 26 August 1978), is an Israeli multi-instrumentalist, music producer, DJ, and remixer. He produced the Israeli Song of the Year in 2015 and 2017 and was declared Arranger of the Year in 2015.

== Career ==
=== 1993–1996: Eman ===
Yahel began his career at the age of 14 as the keyboardist for the Israeli teen rock group Eman, which in 1993 became the youngest group to sign a major record deal in Israel.

=== 2002–2005: Offer Nissim and Maya ===
In 2002, Yahel met Maya Simantov, also known as "Maya", and they began working together. They also collaborated with DJ Offer Nissim on several of his albums, including, First Time (2005), Searching, Forever Tel Aviv, Happy People: Summer Edition, Pride All Over, and Over You.

=== 2006–2008: Remixes and production work ===
By 2006, Yahel began receiving remix assignments from established artists. During this period, together with Nissim, he released several official remix hits, such as Kristine W's "Wonder of It All", Deborah Cooper's "Love You All Over", Amuka's "I Want More", and Deborah Cox's "Easy as Life". The two also remixed Beyoncé's "One Night Only" and "Deja Vu", and Suzanne Palmer's "Home" and "Fascinated".

In 2008, Yahel released the first single under his own name, "Shine", which was co-written with Canadian singer Jesse LaBelle. LaBelle was also the vocalist on the track.

Later in 2008, Yahel teamed up with singer-songwriter and producer Marcus Vest, better known by his stage name Channel 7, to collaborate as music producers on P. Diddy's MTV reality show Making the Band 4. Together with Donnie Klang and Jason Derulo, Yahel and Channel 7 wrote and produced the song "Dr Love", which later appeared on the original soundtrack of the motion picture Aliens in the Attic.

Furthermore, in 2008, Yahel and Vest wrote and produced the title track for singer Ashanti's fifth studio album, The Declaration.

=== 2010: White Is Pure 9 ===
In 2010, Yahel released a remix of Christina Aguilera's "You Lost Me". He also issued the mix compilation White Is Pure 9, an official compilation of Montreal's 2010 White Party Week.

The same year, Yahel collaborated with Israeli singer Kobi Peretz, remixing his song "Baleylot". The two also collaborated in a performance at Gany – Ha'taarucha, in Tel Aviv.

=== 2014–2015: Lorena Simpson, Madonna, and "Golden Boy" ===
In 2014, Yahel released two tracks with Brazilian singer-songwriter Lorena Simpson, "This Moment" and "Worth the Pain". The same year, he issued a remix of "Free People" by Tony Moran featuring Martha Wash. He also worked with Offer Nissim and Maya on the song "Everybody Needs a Man".

Also in 2014, Yahel produced the song "Revolution of Happiness", a collaboration between Lior Narkis and Omer Adam.

The same year, he wrote and produced the track "Love Song for You" for the Supergroup Project. The tune garnered more than four million views on YouTube.

In 2015, Yahel collaborated with Nissim on a remix for Madonna's "Living for Love", from her thirteenth studio album, Rebel Heart.

Also in 2015, Yahel produced the Israeli entry for the Eurovision Song Contest, "Golden Boy", performed by Nadav Guedj.

Yahel was also involved in producing the song "Queen of Roses" (מלכת השושנים) for Israeli singer Eden Ben Zaken.

=== 2016: Pet Shop Boys, Lina Makhul ===
In 2016, Yahel and Offer Nissim produced a remix of the Pet Shop Boys tracks "Say It to Me" and "The Pop Kids", from the British synth-pop duo's thirteenth studio album, Super.

Yahel also wrote the debut single for Palestinian singer Lina Makhul, titled "This Ain't About You", which was released worldwide on 29 April 2016.

In 2017, Yahel again worked with Nadav Guedj, on the single "Maybe We'll Talk" (אולי נדבר), which was #1 on the GLGLZ charts, #1 on the Israeli iTunes chart, and in the top 10 most-played songs by ACUM for 2017/2018.

=== 2018–2021 ===
In 2018, Yahel's single "Sweat" appeared on the soundtrack of the French drama film Sauvage.

In 2019, he produced and co-wrote "Beautiful" by Dutch electro house DJ Moti, with Jetfire and Lovespeake. The same year, Yahel produced the song "Beg", a duet between NETTA and Omer Adam.

In 2020, Yahel produced "Feker Libi", Israel's entry for the Eurovision Song Contest.

He also produced the theme song to the children's reality show Boys & Girls.

The same year, Yahel produced a campaign against violence, featuring Anna Zak. Another single produced by Yahel in 2020 was Ella-Lee's "Ma Ata Rotse?".

In 2021, Yahel worked on Roni Dalumi's single "It Comes to Me", Maor Edri & Shefita's single "Halik", Shiri Maimon's "Tipa", Eden Ben Zaken's "Yom Hafuch", and the first single from Narkis' third studio album, "Holechet Itcha".

=== 2023–present ===
In 2023, Yahel, together with Stav Beger, Tal Forer, Amit Shine, and Oudi Antebi, launched the record label Session42.

== Partial discography ==
Albums

- Shine Remixes (2009)
- מצב טיסה feat. Roni "Dani Din" Levi (2012)
- Colors – Yinon Yahel & Meital De Razon (2015)
- Sweat (Original & Remix Pack) (2015)
- Sweat Pt. 2 (2015)
- Bad Boy (Remixes) – Yinon Yahel & Mor Avrahami (2016)
- Night Is Over (feat. Meital De Razon) – Yinon Yahel & Mor Avrahami (2016)
- Don't Wait (The Remixes) – Yinon Yahel & Mor Avrahami (2018)
- Play It Safe (The Remixes) – Yinon Yahel feat. Sapir Amar (2019)
- The One, Pt. 1 (Remixes) – Yinon Yahel & DJ Head (2019)
- The One, Pt. 2 (Remixes) – Yinon Yahel & DJ Head (2019)
- The One, Pt. 3 (Remixes) – Yinon Yahel & DJ Head (2019)
- You & I (The Remixes) – Yinon Yahel feat. Kai (2019)
- Super Life (Remixes) – Yinon Yahel feat. Meital de Razon (2019)
- Not Good for Me (The Remixes) – Yinon Yahel feat. Sailo (2019)

Compilations

- Rock the Beat #001 (2020)
- Rock the Beat #002 (2020)
- Rock the Beat #003 (2020)
