= Home (Kobi Marimi song) =

2019 song by Kobi Marimi

Single by Kobi Marimi
- Released: 10 March 2019
- Recorded: 2019
- Label: Unicell
- Songwriter(s): Ohad Shragai; Inbar Wizman
- Producer(s): Amos Ben David

Kobi Marimi singles chronology
"Home" (2019)	"Yalla Bye" (2019)

Music video
- "Home" on YouTube

Eurovision Song Contest 2019 entry
- Country: Israel
- Artist(s): Kobi Marimi
- Languages: English
- Composer(s): Ohad Shragai; Inbar Wizman
- Lyricist(s): Ohad Shragai; Inbar Wizman

Finals performance
- Final result: 23rd
- Final points: 35

Entry chronology
- ◄ "Toy" (2018)
- "Feker Libi" (2020) ►

"Home" is a song performed by Israeli singer Kobi Marimi. It represented Israel in the Eurovision Song Contest 2019, in Tel Aviv. It finished in 23rd place at the final, with 35 points. The song was released on 10 March 2019.

== Eurovision Song Contest ==
The song represented Israel in the Eurovision Song Contest 2019, after Kobi Marimi was selected through HaKokhav HaBa L'Eurovizion, the music competition that selects Israel's entries for the Eurovision Song Contest. As the host country, Israel automatically qualified to compete in the final. In addition to its participation in the final, Israel was also required to broadcast and vote in one of the two semi-finals. At the semi-final draw, it was decided that Israel would have to broadcast and vote in semi-final one.

The song received 35 points in the final - all from the televote - and finished 23rd. Critics claimed the poor performance was due to the song being "too slow" and "lacking personality".

== Track listing ==
Single version
No.	Title	Length
1.	"Home"	2:58

Remix version
No.	Title	Length
1.	"Home (Remix)"	2:58

Eurovision version
No.	Title	Length
1.	"Home (Eurovision Version)"	2:58

== Charts ==
Chart (2019)	Peak position
Israel (Media Forest)	2
