= List of Israeli films of 1979 =

A list of films produced by the Israeli film industry in 1979.

== 1979 releases ==
Premiere	Title	Director	Cast	Genre	Notes	Ref
?	Dizengoff 99 (Hebrew: דיזנגוף 99)	Avi Nesher	Gali Atari, Gidi Gov, Meir Suissa, and Anat Atzmon	Romance		
?	Going Steady (Hebrew: אסקימו לימון 2 - יוצאים קבוע) (Lemon Popsicle II)	Boaz Davidson	Yftach Katzur, Zachi Noy, Jonathan Sagall	Comedy, Drama, Romance		
?	Na'arat haparvarim (Hebrew: נערת הפרברים, lit. "Suburban Girl")	George Obadiah	Ofra Haza	Musical		
?	Roveh Huliot (Hebrew: רובה חוליות)	Ilan Moshenson	Arik Rosen	Drama		
?	Ha-Lahaka (Hebrew: הלהקה, lit. "The Troupe")	Avi Nesher	Gidi Gov, Sassi Keshet, Meir Suissa, Gali Atari, Chelli Goldenberg	Comedy, Drama, Musical		
?	Shlager (Hebrew: שלאגר, lit. "The Hit")	Avi Nesher	Gavri Banai, Yisrael Poliakov, Shaike Levi, Ofra Haza	Musical		
?	Transit (Hebrew: טרנזיט)	Daniel Wachsmann			Entered into the 30th Berlin International Film Festival	
?	Imi Hageneralit (Hebrew: אמי הגנרלית, lit. "My Mother the General")	Joel Silberg	Gila Almagor	Comedy, Drama		
?	The Magician of Lublin	Menahem Golan		Drama	An Israeli-German co-production	
?	Lo La'alot Yoter (Hebrew: לא לעלות יותר)	Ze'ev Revach		Comedy		
?	Nisuin Nusah Tel Aviv (Hebrew: נישואין נוסח תל אביב, lit. "Marriage Tel Aviv Style")	Joel Silberg		Drama		
?	Ta'ut Bamispar (Hebrew: טעות במספר, lit. "Wrong Number")	Ze'ev Revach		Drama		
	Dizengoff 99	Avi Nesher	Gali Atari, Gidi Gov, and Anat Atzmon	Comedy	Dizengoff 99	

== See also ==
- 1979 in Israel
