= Dizengoff 99 =

- Directed by: Avi Nesher
- Written by: Avi Nesher
- Produced by: Arnon Milchan; David Shapira; Roni Yaakov
- Starring: Gali Atari; Gidi Gov; Meir Suissa; Anat Atzmon
- Edited by: Yitzhak Chayek
- Distributed by: Shapira Films
- Release date: 1979
- Running time: 110 minutes
- Country: Israel
- Language: Hebrew

Dizengoff 99 (Hebrew: דיזנגוף 99) is a 1979 Israeli comedy-drama film written and directed by Avi Nesher. It stars Gali Atari, Gidi Gov, Meir Suissa, and Anat Atzmon. The film portrays life around Dizengoff Street in Tel Aviv during the late 1970s. It was filmed in Tel Aviv and released in Israel and the United States under the title Dizengoff 99, and in West Germany as Three Under the Roof (German: Drei unter'm Dach). The film is regarded as a cult classic.

== Plot summary ==
The film follows three roommates—Natti (Gidi Gov), Moshon (Meir Suissa), and Ossi (Anat Atzmon)—who share an apartment at 99 Dizengoff Street in Tel Aviv. Ossi works at an insurance company, and together the three decide to produce a film using stolen equipment. The story depicts their efforts to make the film alongside their romantic relationships and social experiences.

== Cast ==
- Gali Atari — Miri
- Gidi Gov — Natti
- Meir Suissa — Moshon
- Anat Atzmon — Ossi
- Chelli Goldenberg — Ilana

== About the film ==
Dizengoff 99 was Avi Nesher’s second film, produced following the success of his 1978 film HaLahakah, which also featured Gidi Gov, Meir Suissa, and Gali Atari. The story was partly based on Nesher’s own experiences after completing his mandatory military service in the Israel Defense Forces, when he shared an apartment on Dizengoff Street with Yitzhak Tzachik (the editor of the film) and Dita Aviram (who later became the film’s artistic consultant).

The film was commercially successful upon its release and has been noted as a reflection of youth culture in the State Israel during the late 1970s. Nesher and producer Sharon Harel incorporated elements of popular culture of the period, such as disco and contemporary Israeli pop music. The soundtrack included songs such as "To Live with Him" by Riki Gal, "Tzlil Mekuvan" by Yitzhak Klepter, "Long Way" by Gali Atari, "Friday Party" by Svika Pick, "Layla Li" by Yorik Ben-David, and "Moving House" by Dori Ben-Zeev. The theme song was performed by Yigal Bashan.

One of the film’s sex scenes used a cover of the Lehakat HaNahal song “Shalva” from the soundtrack of HaLahaka. The scene was considered unusual for Israeli cinema of the time and drew criticism from some viewers. Gali Atari, who appeared in the scene, later expressed discomfort with it, describing it as overly explicit, though she later retracted her comments.

The film also includes a scene in which Natti (played by Gov) begins writing a script titled The Cowards, which became the title of Nesher’s next film.

== Legacy ==
Dizengoff 99 is regarded as a classic Israeli film. Between 2003 and 2016, the address 99 Dizengoff Street housed the Bauhaus Center Tel Aviv.

In a 2006 article, it was reported that Gali Atari later described her appearance in the film’s sex scene as a moment in her career she preferred to forget.

== Soundtrack ==
Dizengoff 99

Studio album by Various
- Released: 1979
- Genre: Soundtrack

A soundtrack was released to this movie, called "Dizengoff 99" and is filled with notable Israeli artists.

1. Dizengoff 99 - Yigal Bashan
2. Mesibat Yom Shishi - Tzvika Pick
3. Lagur Ito - Riki Gal
4. Ovrim Dira - Dori Ben Zeev
5. Rok B'Or Yarok - Arik Sinai
6. Ein Li Zman Lihiyot Atzuv - Rami Fortis
7. Tzlil Mekhuvan - Yitzhak Klepter
8. Leyad HaDelet - Yehudit Ravitz
9. Lailah Li - Yorik Ben David
10. Bein HaRe'ashim - David Broza
11. Ad Eizeh Gil - Dani Litani
12. Derekh Aruka - Gali Atari
