= 1979 in Israel =

- Decades: 1950s; 1960s; 1970s; 1980s; 1990s
- See also: History of Israel; Timeline of Israeli history; List of years in Israel

This article outlines events which occurred in Israel in the year 1979.

== Incumbents ==
- President of Israel – Yitzhak Navon
- Prime Minister of Israel – Menachem Begin (Likud)
- President of the Supreme Court – Yoel Zussman
- Chief of General Staff – Rafael Eitan
- Government of Israel – 18th Government of Israel

== Events ==
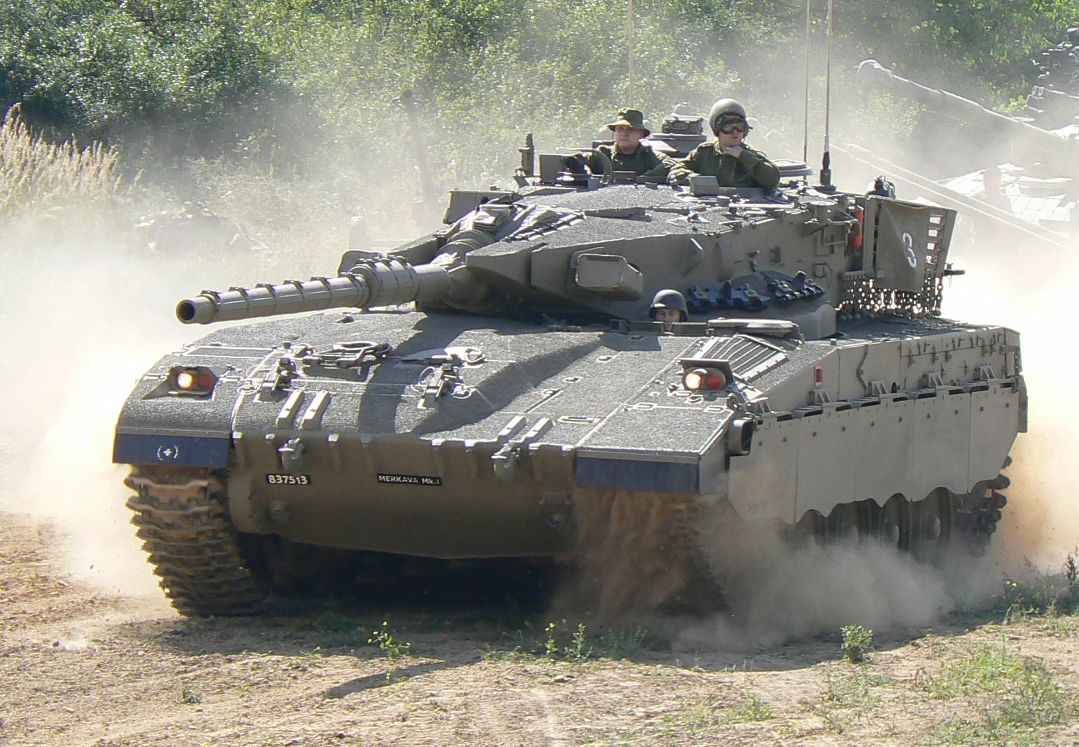
April 1979 – The Israeli developed and produced battle tank Merkava was first introduced to the IDF forces.

- 22 March – The Knesset approves the peace treaty between Israel and Egypt.
- 26 March – In a ceremony at the White House, President Anwar Sadat of Egypt and Prime Minister Menachem Begin of Israel sign a peace treaty. Egypt thus becomes the first Arab country to officially recognize Israel.
- 31 March – Milk and Honey represents Israel at the Eurovision Song Contest with the song “Hallelujah”, held at the Binyanei HaUma in Jerusalem, following Israel’s win the previous year, and achieving first place for the Israeli entry for the second consecutive year.
- April – nearly nine years after the decision to produce it was taken, the Israeli developed and produced battle tank Merkava was first introduced to the IDF forces.
- 21 October – Moshe Dayan resigns from the Israeli government. Dayan stated that he felt isolated from the Palestinian autonomy talks and was reduced to handling marginal foreign policy chores.

=== Israeli–Palestinian conflict ===
The most prominent events related to the Israeli–Palestinian conflict which occurred during 1979 include:

- 14 March – IDF soldier Avraham Amram, who was killed during the 1978 South Lebanon conflict, are returned to Israel as part of a prisoners exchange, in exchange for 76 Fatah militants.

Notable Palestinian militant operations against Israeli targets

The most prominent terror attacks committed against Israelis during 1979 include:

- 22 April – 1979 Nahariya attack: A group of four Palestinian Liberation Front militants, including the 16-year-old Samir Kuntar, enter Israel from Lebanon by boat and infiltrate the Israeli town of Nahariya, located ten kilometers south of the Lebanese border. The squad murder four Israeli civilians, including three members of one family: Danny Haran and his children, Einat Haran (age four) and Yael Haran (age two).
- 13 November – Israeli Ambassador to Portugal Ephraim Eldar was wounded during an attack carried out by Palestinian militants. During the attack a security guard was killed and an embassy chauffeur and local policeman were injured.

Notable Israeli military operations against Palestinian militancy targets

The most prominent Israeli military counter-terrorism operations (military campaigns and military operations) carried out against Palestinian militants during 1979 include:

=== Unknown dates ===
- The founding of the community settlement Ashalim.

== Notable births ==
- 11 March – Keren Peles, Israeli singer.
- 10 June – Assi azar, Israeli television personality
- 29 June – Yehuda Levi, Israeli actor and model.
- 26 July – Rona Keinan, Israeli singer.
- 9 August – Salim Tuama, Israeli Arab footballer.
- 29 August – Ehud Tenenbaum, Israeli cracker known as "The Analyzer".
- 13 November – Subliminal, Israeli rapper.

== Notable deaths ==
- 19 April – Shlomo Perlstein (born 1902), Austro-Hungarian (Galicia)-born Israeli politician.
- 20 June – Yisrael Yeshayahu (born 1911), Yemeni-born Israeli politician and minister.
- 10 November – Mahmud Al-Nashaf (born 1906), Israeli Arab politician.
- 14 August – Yehoshua Rabinovitz (born 1911), Russian (Belarus)-born Israeli politician.
- 16 November – Rachel Yanait Ben-Zvi (born 1886), Russian (Ukraine)-born Israeli author, educator, and a leading Labor Zionist.
- 26 November – Binyamin Shahor (born 1916), Israeli politician.
- Full date unknown – Abraham Schalit (born 1898), Austro-Hungarian (Galicia)-born Israeli historian.

== See also ==
- 1979 in Israeli film
- 1979 in Israeli television
- 1979 in Israeli music
- 1979 in Israeli sport
- Israel in the Eurovision Song Contest 1979
