= The Wonders =

The Wonders may refer to:

- The Wonders (2013 film), 2013 Israel film
- The Wonders (film), 2014 Italian film
- The Wonders, fictional band in That Thing You Do!
