= Opening act =

Entertainment act that performs at a concert before the featured act

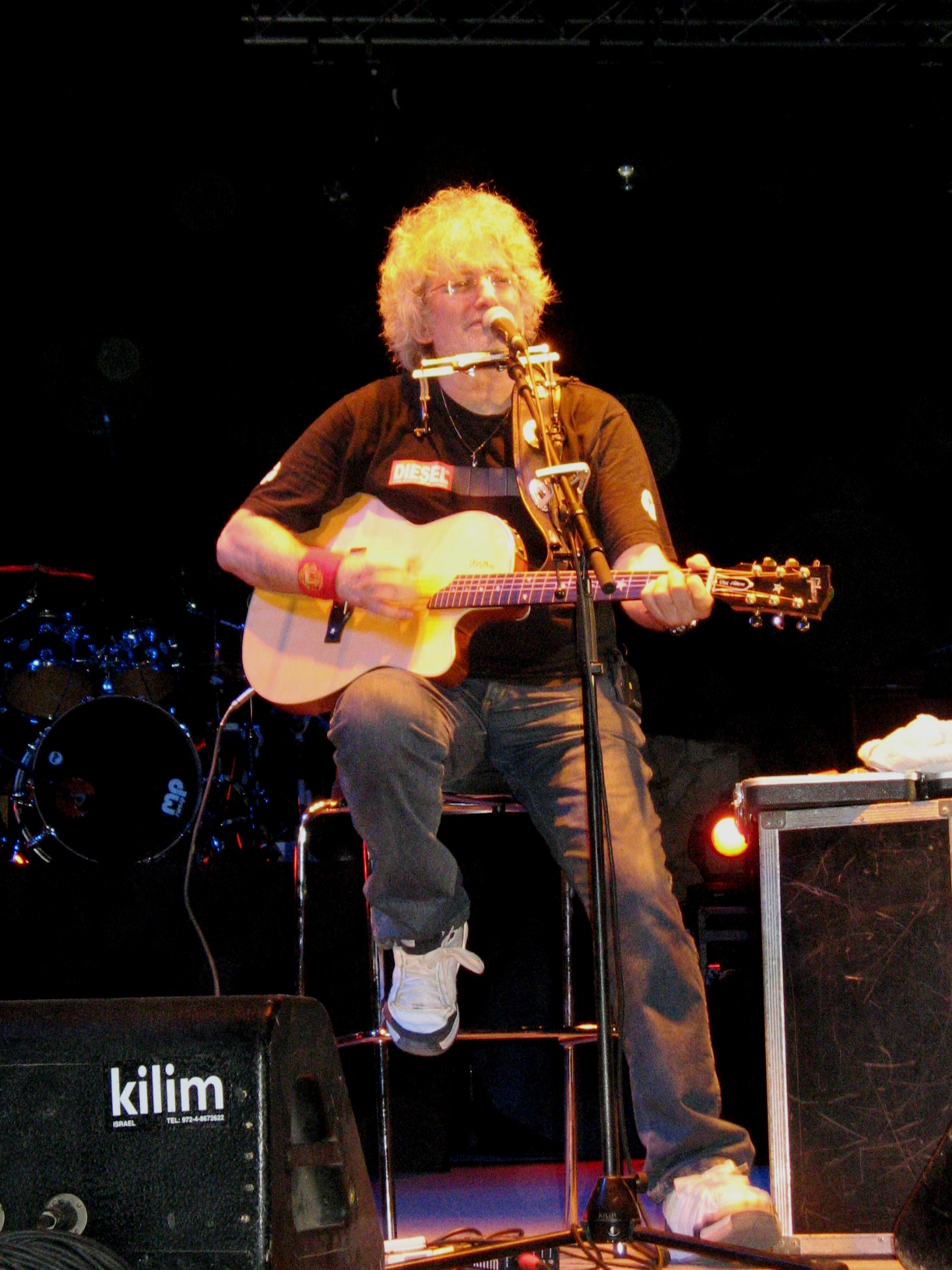
Dani Litani opening for Joe Cocker, 2008

An opening act, also known as a warm-up act, support act, supporting act or opener, is an entertainment act (musical, comedic, or otherwise), that performs at a concert before the featured act, or "headliner". Rarely, an opening act may perform again at the end of the event, or perform with the featured act after both have had a set to themselves.

The opening act's performance serves to "warm up" the audience, making it appropriately excited and enthusiastic for the headliner.

== Usages ==
=== Rock music ===
In rock music, the opening act will usually be an up-and-coming group with a smaller following than the headliner. On long concert tours, different opening acts may be used for different legs of the tour.

=== Comedy club ===
In comedy, a warm-up comedian or crowd warmer is a stand-up comedian who performs at a comedy club or before the filming of a television comedy in front of a studio audience.

More rarely, a comedian will open for a music concert. Their role is to make the audience feel integral to the show and encourage reactions during the show. They usually work alone and perform a comedy routine while also possibly explaining aspects of the show. In a television recording, they will also perform during commercial breaks. Some warm-up routines before talk shows involve giving prizes to audience members. The use of warm-ups in comedy dates back before television to radio shows.

=== Sports ===
In sports, an undercard is a preliminary bout or race between lesser known competitors, at a boxing, professional wrestling, horse racing, auto racing, or other sports event.

== See also ==
- Curtain raiser (drama)
- Compère
- Crowd manipulation
