= Shosh =

Shosh may refer to:

- Shosh, Albania, a municipality in the Shkodër District, Shkodër County, northwestern Albania
- Shosh, Nagorno-Karabakh (also Shushikend and Shushakend), a village in the disputed region of Nagorno-Karabakh
- Shosh Atari, Israeli actress
