= Izhar Cohen =

Israeli musical artist

Izhar Cohen יזהר כהן
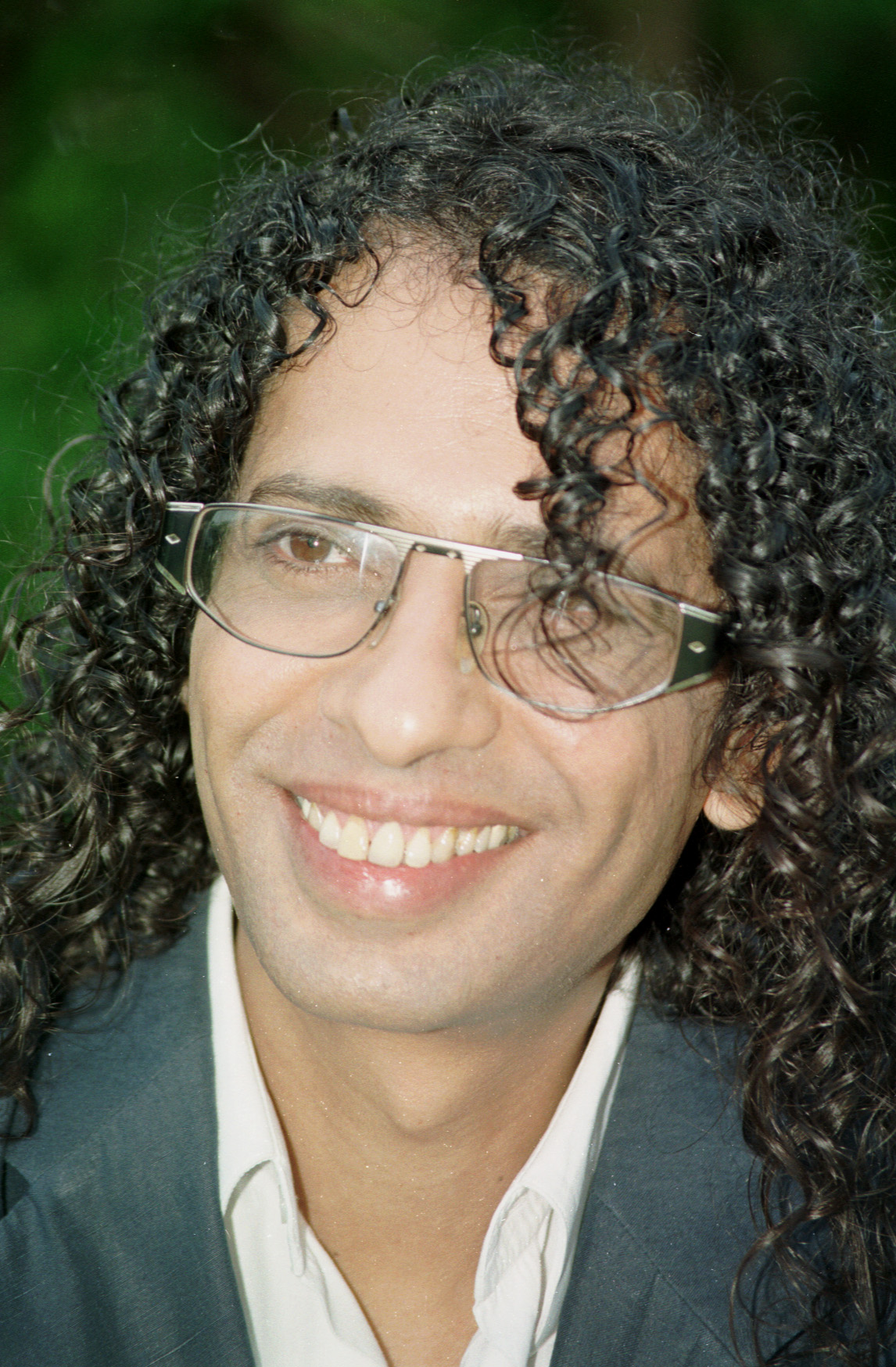

Background information
- Born: 13 March 1951 (age 75); Tel Aviv, Israel
- Genre: Pop
- Occupations: Singer-songwriter; actor; jewelry artist
- Instrument: Vocals
- Years active: 1970–present

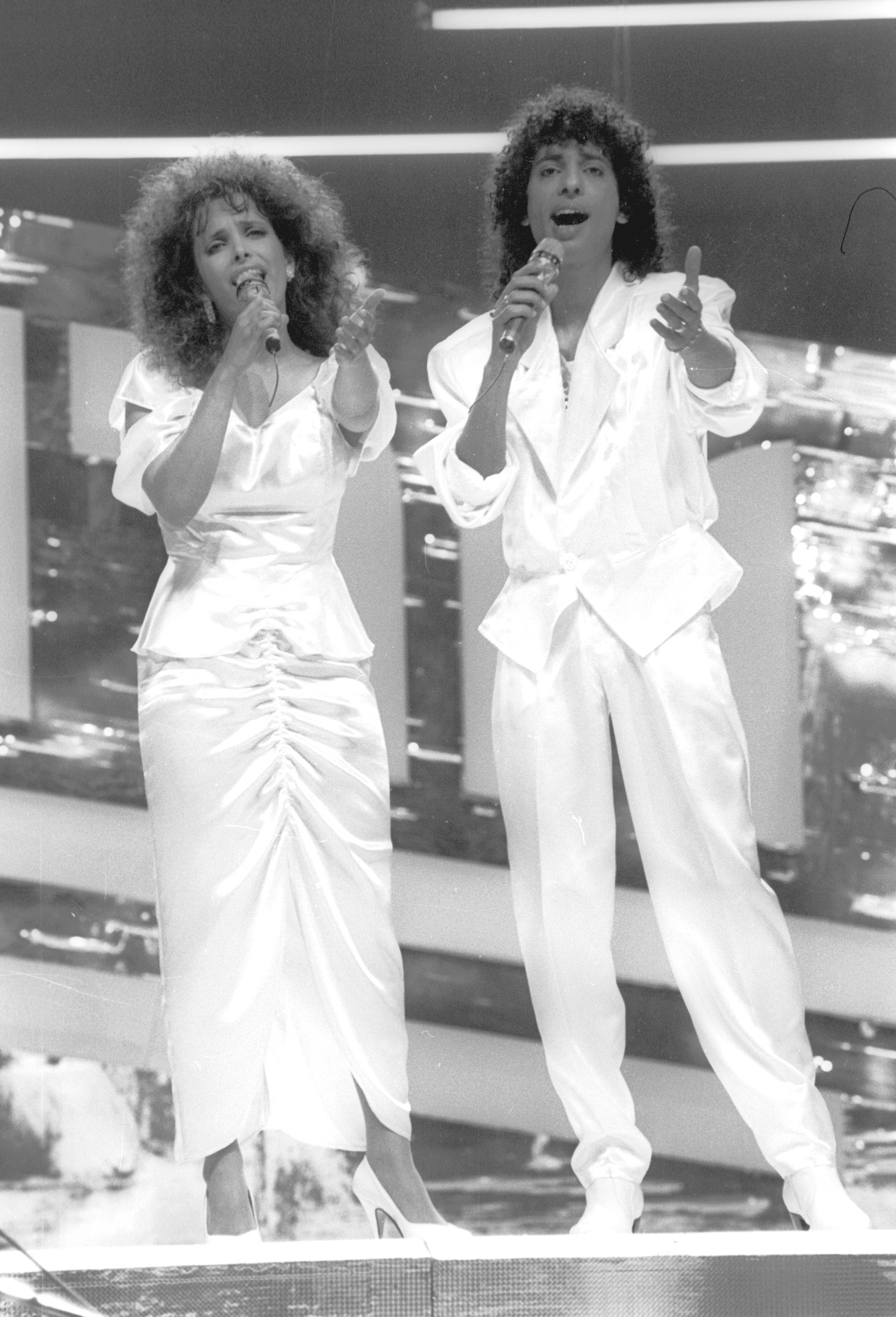
Izhar Cohen with his sister Vardina, during the 1987 Kdam Eurovision

Izhar Cohen (Hebrew: יִזְהָר כֹּהֵן, [jizˈhaʁ ˈkohen]; born 13 March 1951) is an Israeli singer who won the 1978 Eurovision Song Contest.

== Biography ==
Izhar Cohen was born in Tel Aviv, Israel, and raised in Givatayim, to a family of singers of Yemenite-Jewish descent – Shlomo Cohen, Sarah Cohen, and Hofni, Pini, and Vardina Cohen.

== Singing and stage career ==
Cohen started to sing when he was a child and joined his father in his performances. At 18, Cohen joined the IDF's Nachal entertainment troupe. During the 1970s Cohen was one of the most played singers in Israel. Representing Israel, he won the Eurovision Song Contest 1978 with the group Alphabeta performing "A-Ba-Ni-Bi" with music by Nurit Hirsh and words by Ehud Manor. The title of the song is the Hebrew word "ani" (first person singular pronoun) expressed in the popular children's language game "Bet language".

Cohen later represented Israel again (this time with an unnamed group of backing singers) at the 1985 contest performing "Olé, Olé" (music – Kobi Oshrat, words – Hamutal Ben-Ze'ev) where he finished 5th. He attempted to represent Israel again in 1982, 1987 and 1996 but did not win the national final.

Cohen was an actor in the Haifa Theatre. He owns a jewelry shop on Dizengoff Street in Tel Aviv.

Izhar was on The Singer in the Mask as "Bull", getting 10th overall.

In 2024, Izhar was on Israel's "Dancing with the stars" and was eliminated on 26 June 2024.

== See also ==
- Music of Israel

Awards and achievements
Preceded by (France) Marie Myriam with "L'oiseau et l'enfant"	Winner of the Eurovision Song Contest (with Alphabeta); 1978	Succeeded by (Israel) Milk and Honey with "Hallelujah"
Preceded by Ilanit with "Ahava Hi Shir Lishnayim"	Israel in the Eurovision Song Contest (with Alphabeta); 1978	Succeeded by Milk and Honey with "Hallelujah"
Preceded by Ofra Haza with "Khay"	Israel in the Eurovision Song Contest (5th with Ole Ole); 1985	Succeeded by Moti Giladi & Sarai Tzuriel with "Yavo Yom"
