= The Band (film) =

1978 film

- Original poster in Hebrew
- Hebrew: הלהקה
- Directed by: Avi Nesher
- Edited by: Izthk Tzhayek
- Music by: Yair Rozenblum
- Release date: 8 April 1978
- Running time: 112 minutes
- Country: Israel
- Language: Hebrew

The Band, הלהקה, (also known as The Troupe) is a 1978 Israeli musical comedy film directed by Avi Nesher about a military band during the War of Attrition. The story dives into the hazing, intense rivalries, and romantic entanglements between veteran members and new recruits who are eager to prove themselves. At the center of the film is a conflict and rebellion in the band following disagreements. It is based on real events, including the "Great Rebellion" that took place in the Lehakat HaNahal in 1971, during rehearsals for a major show celebrating the 30th anniversary of the Palmach.

The film was a major commercial success in Israel, attracting half a million viewers at theatres upon its release. Over the years, it has become one of the most celebrated films in the history of Israeli cinema. The film was accompanied by composer and arranger Yair Rosenblum, who was the musical director of the Lehakat HaNahal and composed the songs sung by the band, and who also appears with them in the film. The songs were re-recorded by the film's actors in his own arrangements. In addition, all of the actors in the film, except for Gali Atari and Chelli Goldenberg, are former members of military bands themselves, and drawing from their experiences.

== Plot ==
In 1968, an Israeli military ensemble (based on The Nahal Band), performs comedy and musical acts to boost morale among soldiers in combat zones during the War of Attrition. At the film’s start, three veteran members of the troupe give their farewell performance before finishing their service in the Israel Defense Forces. The next day, auditions are held by troupe director Paul Aviv (Tuvia Tzafir) to fill these positions, resulting in the selection of three new recruits: the forward Giora Datner (Gidi Gov), the nerdy Moshe "Bazooka" Albuz (Meir Suissa), and the talented Noa Barron (Dafana Armoni). The veteran troupe members welcome the new recruits very coldly by hazing them.

During a rehearsal, Leicht, the assistant musical director, unexpectedly assigns Noa a solo originally sung by the troupe’s prima donna, Yaffa (Smadar Brenner). Jealous of Noa’s pure talent, she storms out of the rehearsal in tears.

Later on while painting sets for the new show, Noa breaks down in tears following cruel remarks from Yaffa, Sari (Galiat Anorki), and Mali (Gali Atari) after the previous night following the rehearsal. Datner and Bazooka try to figure out what’s wrong, until Zami (Eli Gorenstein), the troupe’s electrician, explains to them that hazing new recruits is “Tradition”. In defiance, Datner and Bazooka decide to retaliate.

On the day of their first performance in front of an audience, Datner and Bazooka begin their payback hazing. They damage the drummer’s set, fill powder inside the keyboard, and Yaffa and another veteran, Doron (Yoni Chen) get electrocuted from wetting the microphones. Believing the sabotage to be part of a comedy act, the audience just erupts in thunderous laughter.

The next morning, before boarding a bus for a concert tour, drummer Shuka, Doron, and keyboardist Moni, take their hazing to the next level by smearing dog feces on Datner's bus seat. Sensing it’s another prank, Datner dramatically pretends to faint, causing alarm among the troupe. Moni’s spunky loudmouth girlfriend Micki (Liron Nirgad), confronts him, Shuka, and Doron for their disgusting actions, demanding they clean the seat. A brief moment, Datner winks at Micki, sparking a budding romance between them.

During the journey, Dani (Sassi Kesshet), the troupe's charming and flirtatious lead singer, and Yaffa’s boyfriend, Commander Moti (Doval’e Glickman), both develop feelings for Noa, sparking a rivalry between them. Meanwhile, the shy Bazooka becomes infatuated with Dani's girlfriend, Orli (Chelli Goldenberg). Datner steps in to teach Bazooka how to navigate relationships, setting him up on a series of practice dates before he attempts to approach Orli. Datner sets Bazooka up on several dates that go poorly. Meanwhile, the hazing continues between Datner and Bazooka vs. Moni, Shuka, and Doron on and off stage.

Early one morning, Moti announces to the troupe that they’ve been chosen to perform on a National Entertainment Army Variety show on television. Despite the excitement for the special, tensions continue to escalate. Noa is given another solo, further intensifying Yaffa’s resentment. During the show, a piece of backdrop scenery unexpectedly falls, nearly hitting Noa. Eventually, the ongoing practical jokes boil over, leading to intense confrontations, such as Moti confronting Dani falling for Noa.

As the television performance draws closer, tensions within the troupe start to impact their performances, with some soldiers in the audience even walking out mid-show. Amidst the growing drama, Israeli Army Officer Alron, enforces a strict 48-hour boot camp rehearsal, led by Aviv, to prepare for the television special. He cautions the troupe that any further misbehavior could lead to a significant reduction in their ranks.

The long rehearsal soon takes a toll on the troupe’s performances, with exhaustion affecting everyone—especially Micki. After a wake up call commandment from Aviv, Micki eventually snaps and dumps a cup of yogurt on his face before storming out of the rehearsal hall. She eventually is court-martialed, placed on 30 days probation, and removed from both the troupe and the television special. Heartbroken and outraged over the loss of their key member and his girlfriend, a rebellious Datner confronts Aviv for the action he caused to have Micki removed. Eventually Bazooka and veteran troupe members step forward with Datner, which turns into a strike against their director, as they all demand to have Micki back. Aviv refuses. He angrily disbands the troupe on the spot, places them on lockdown, and storms out to inform Alron.

While awaiting Aviv's return, the veteran members, along with Datner, Bazooka, and Noa, begin bonding for the first time. During a game that combines spin the bottle with truth or dare, secrets and confessions come to light. Benjamin Razon, a quiet member of the troupe, comes out as queer; Datner reveals he lost his virginity to Micki; Mali discovers her best friend, Sari, has been betraying her; and Bazooka finally gets his long-awaited dream kiss from Orli.

Furious over the chaos in rehearsal, Alron confronts Datner, Dani, and Moti for their actions they caused. As punishment, he announces that the troupe’s television special is canceled and that each member will be reassigned to different army bases. During the lineup to receive new assignments, Zami, who has overheard everything, intervenes to stop the split, holding Alron, Aviv, and assistant Shula accountable for the troupe’s issues. To make his point, he humorously dumps two cups of yogurt over himself. Laughter erupts and the commanders reconsider, and the television special is back on. The full troupe, including Micki, stays together as they head into rehearsals with renewed unity.

At the film’s conclusion, the Troupe is shown performing live on television, singing Shir LaShalom and inviting the audience to join them on stage.

== Cast ==
- Gidi Gov as Giora Datner
- Liron Nirgad as Michal (Micki) Ben Tov
- Meir Swisa as Moshe Albez
- Sassi Keshet as Dani Stav
- Dov Glickman as Mordechai (Moti) Helperon
- Smadar Brenner as Yafa "Yafchuk" Harish
- Dafna Armoni as Noa Baron
- Gali Atari as Malka Levy
- Chelli Goldenberg as Orly Ne'eman
- Gilat Ankori as Sarah "Sari" Liechtenstein
- Tuvia Tzafir as Paul Aviv
- Yoni Chen as Doron
- Eli Gorenstein as Zamar "Zami" Klein, aka Antenna

== Production ==
Nesher wrote most of the script with his then-partner, Sharon Harel, when they were both students at Columbia University. According to Nesher, Paramount Pictures were initially interested when they were shown the script, but would not commit to the project with Nesher also directing. Nesher and Harel returned to Tel Aviv as a friend and producer had agreed to make the film. This financing fell through and the pair secured a second producer. Harel estimates that they saw 2,000 people during the casting period.

== Reception ==
In 2024, Hannah Brown, film critic at The Jerusalem Post, described the film as "phenomenally successful", praising its "charismatic young cast". Brown raised how "the story of rebellion among the performers that can be seen as a metaphor for youth defying society’s conventions,". Brown also noted that songs from the film's score "are still popular to this day."
