= Anat Atzmon =

Israeli actress and singer (born 1958)

Anat Atzmon ענת עצמון
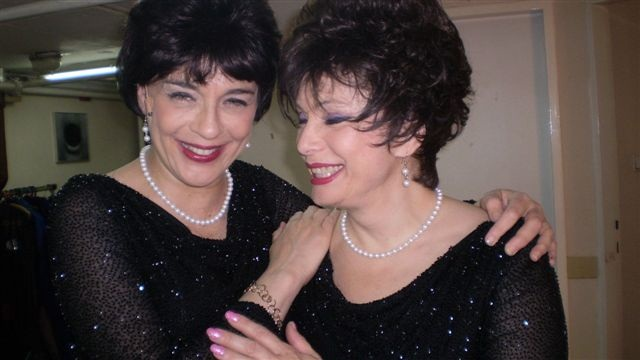
- Anat Atzmon (left) with Monica Wardimon, 2009
- Born: 27 November 1958 (age 67); Tel Aviv, Israel
- Occupations: Actress and singer
- Partner: Danny Sanderson

Anat Atzmon (Hebrew: ענת עצמון; born 27 November 1958) is an Israeli actress and singer.

== Biography ==
Atzmon was born and raised in Tel Aviv. She is the daughter of the theater actor Shmulik Atzmon, a native of Biłgoraj, Poland, who survived the Holocaust by fleeing east into the Soviet Union. In her childhood her father exposed her to the Yiddish culture.

Atzmon studied at the Aleph High School of Arts Tel Aviv (תיכון א' לאמנויות תל אביב). In 1976 Atzmon was drafted and she subsequently served in the IDF theater. After her military service Atzmon learned to act in the Tel Aviv University. Atzmon became widely famous in Israel during 1978, when she played the main character of Nili in Boaz Davidson's cult youth film Lemon Popsicle (Eskimo Limon).

Following the enormous success of Lemon Popsicle and the publicity given to Atzmon, in 1979 she starred in Avi Nesher's film Dizengoff 99. This film also won a phenomenal success and evidently also become an Israeli cult film. In 1981 Atzmon played in the film The Vulture and in 1982, she played in Yaky Yosha's film Dead End Street. In 1984 Atzmon starred in Evidence of Rape and Yaky Yosha's film Summertime Blues. In 1986 Atzmon played alongside her father in the film Pact of Love and later on in Moshe Mizrahi's film Stolen Love. In 1988, Atzmon played in the film Shock of the Battle.

In 1989, Atzmon began her singing career when she released her first album "Bachalom" (בחלום), which included a song which she performed that same year in the Kdam Eurovision song contest and which ended up in fourth place.

In 1992, Atzmon played in the films Double Edge and the Spirit of Angels. In the same year, Atzmon competed for the second time in the Kdam Eurovision song contest with the song "HaTikva" (התקווה). Atzmon eventually lost to Dafna Dekel and filed a lawsuit against Dekel because Dekel's song "Ze Rak Sport" (זה רק ספורט), which was chosen to represent Israel in the Eurovision Song Contest, exceeded the required playtime in 17 seconds. Nevertheless, Atzmon lost the suit, and Dekel shortened her song to the required 3 minutes. During the same year Atzmon released her second album "Lila Kar VeDmut Alma ... " (לילה כר ודמות עלמה...), the album was a commercial failure.

In 1997, Atzmon played in the film Mossad and in 1999 she played in the films Frank Sinatra is Dead and Seven Days in Elul (שבעה ימים באלול). During 1999, Atzmon also published her first children's book called Moni Shmanmoni VeChanut Hamamtakim (מוני שמנמוני וחנות הממתקים). In 2001, Atzmon played in the Israeli telenovela City Tower as Orit.

Through the years Atzmon also had a theatrical career. Atzmon played among others in the Be'er Sheva Theater and at the Beit Lessin Theater. At 1998, after her father opened the Yiddishpiel theater in Tel Aviv, Atzmon played in various Yiddish plays in the theater. Atzmon also played in the play Chapter Two in the Hacameri theater.

During the 2000s, she released various singles from her upcoming third album.

In 2008, Atzmon played in the musical drama "Danny Hollywood" alongside Ran Danker in which she played Danker's mother.

=== Private life ===
In 1989, Atzmon married actor Dan Turgeman. The couple had two children, Liam and Elad, and eventually divorced in 2003. Afterwards, Atzmon had a long relationship with actor Sharon Alexander. Now she is the partner of singer and musician Danny Sanderson.

== Filmography ==
=== Movies ===
- 1978: Lemon Popsicle
- 1979: Dizengoff 99
- 1981: Ha-Ayit
- 1984: Edut Me'ones Raphaël Rebibo
- 1986: Every Time We Say Goodbye
- 1986: Chozeh Ahavah
- 1992: Lahav Hatzui
- 1997: Minotaur
- 1999: Frank Sinatra Is Dead
- 1999: Shiv'a Yamim Be'Elul
- 2016: Amor Raphaël Rebibo
- 2022: The Other Widow as Amalia

=== TV Series ===
- 1995: Pulse counter
- 2001: City Tower
- 2008: Danny Hollywood

== Discography ==
- 1989: Bachalom
- 1992: Lila Kar VeDmut Alma ...
