= The Penitent (film) =

- Directed by: Cliff Osmond
- Written by: Cliff Osmond
- Produced by: Michael Fitzgerald
- Starring: Raul Julia; Armand Assante
- Cinematography: Robin Vidgeon
- Edited by: Peter Taylor
- Music by: Alex North
- Distributed by: Cineworld Pictures
- Release date: May 27, 1988
- Running time: 94 minutes
- Countries: United States; Mexico
- Language: English

The Penitent is a 1988 American-Mexican film and the directorial debut of Cliff Osmond. It stars Raul Julia and Armand Assante.

== Plot ==
In a small, deeply religious New Mexican town where annually the crucifixion of Jesus is literally reenacted, a love triangle with tragic results develops between a troubled young wife Celia Guerola (Rona Freed), her husband Ramón Guerola (Raul Julia) and his handsome best friend Juan Mateo (Armand Assante).

== Cast ==
- Raul Julia as Ramon Guerola
- Armand Assante as Juan Mateo
- Rona De Ricci as Celia Guerola (Credited as Rona Freed)
- Julie Carmen as Corina
- Lucy Reina as Margarita
- Eduardo Lopez Rojas as The Mayor
- Juana Molinero as Ramon's Mother
- Martin LaSalle as Miguel
- Tina Romero as Susana
- Demián Bichir as Roberto
