= Avi Nesher =

Israeli film producer & director

- אבי נשר
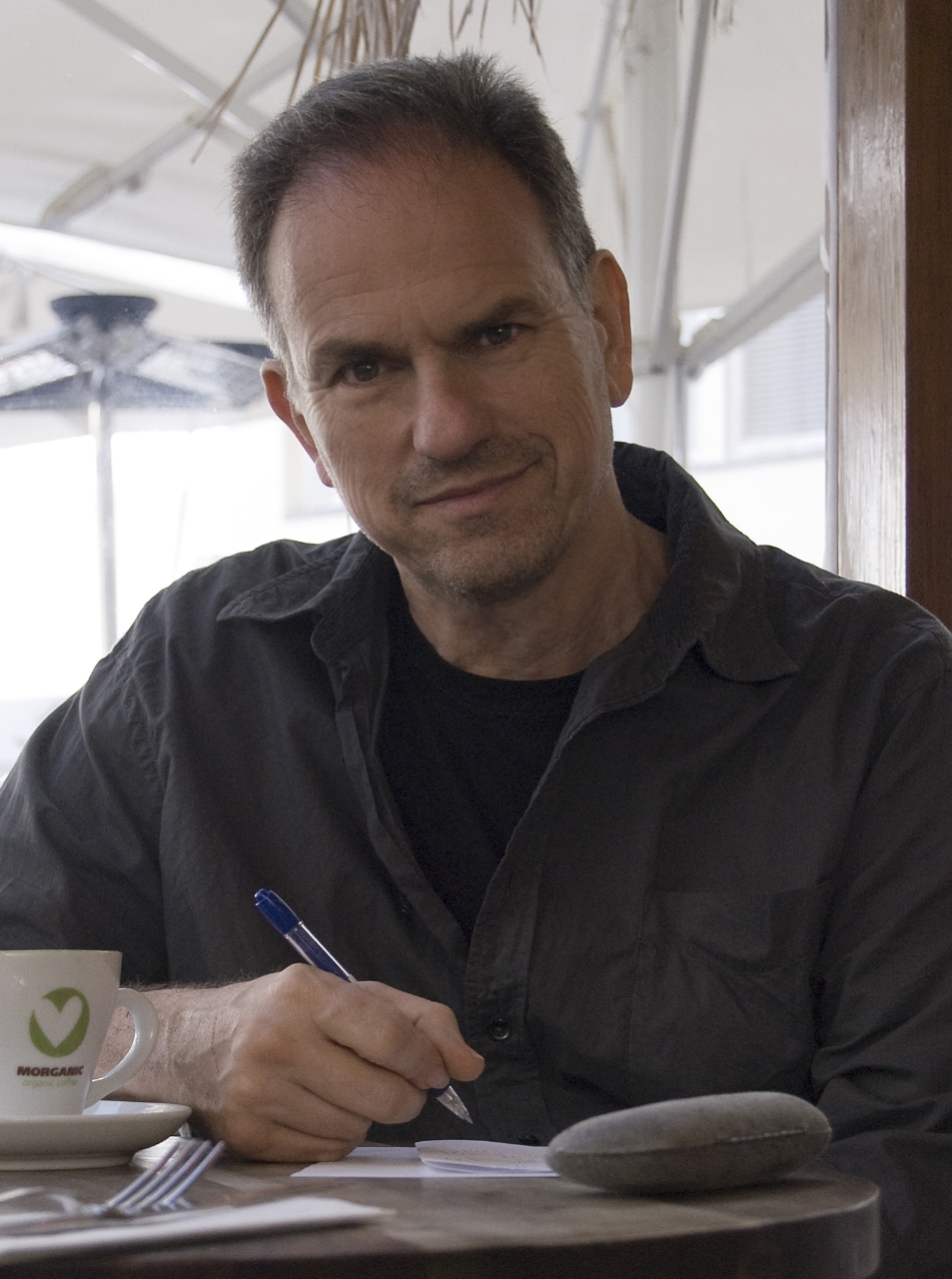
- Avi Nesher 2009
- Born: 13 December 1953 (age 72); Ramat Gan, Israel
- Occupations: Film producer, film director, screenwriter
- Years active: 1979–present
- Spouse: Iris Nesher
- Children: Tom Nesher

Avi Nesher (Hebrew: אבי נשר; born 13 December 1952) is an Israeli film producer, film director, screenwriter and actor.

He rose to prominence with his directorial debut, HaLahaka (1979), which has become one of the most loved films in Israel. Nesher then directed Dizengoff 99 (1979), a comedy-drama about life around Dizengoff Street in the 1970s in Tel Aviv. His 1984 film, Rage and Glory, won critical acclaim overseas while being controversial in Israel for its subject content and release during the First Lebanon War.

Nesher then embarked on a career in Hollywood, releasing English-language films such as Doppelganger (1993), starring Drew Barrymore.

Nesher resumed his filmmaking career in Israel with the box office smash hit, Turn Left at the End of the World (2004). He has since directed films such as The Secrets (2007), The Matchmaker (2010), Past Life (2016), The Other Story (2018), Image of Victory (2021), Gan Kofim (2023) and Our Loves (2026).

== Early life ==
Avi Nesher was born in Ramat Gan, Israel and later raised on the Upper West Side in Manhattan in New York City. His father was a diplomat from Czernowitz, and his mother came from Yedenitz in Bessarabia. His parents were Holocaust survivors, his father was in labor camps in Romania and his mother lost all her family. In 1965, he moved with his family to the United States. He graduated from Ramaz School and studied international relations at Columbia University. In 1971 he returned to Israel. Nesher enlisted into the IDF elite special forces unit Sayeret Matkal where Yoni Netanyahu was his superior. He served for a year, before being injured. He then studied international relations for two years at Columbia University before returning to the IDF. He fought in the Yom Kippur War in 1973 and lost two close childhood friends.

== Film career ==
In 1978, Nesher directed and produced his first film, The Band, which depicted an army entertainment troupe similar to the Lehakat HaNahal (Nahal band). The film stars many of the leading actors and singers of that era, including Gidi Gov, Gali Atari, Sassi Keshet and Heli Goldenberg, most of whom served in military entertainment troupes themselves. The film was a great commercial success in Israel (600,000 viewers), received excellent reviews and gained cult film status. The movie production, accompanied by the composer Yair Rosenblum, who was musical director of the Nahal Military Group and composed the songs the band also appear in the film.

In 1979, Nesher directed his second film, Dizengoff 99, about three young friends living together in a flat on Dizengoff Street, the center of nightlife in Tel Aviv. The film is based on the experiences of Nesher himself, when he lived with two friends in Tel Aviv. The soundtrack of the film included songs performed by Zvika Pick, Riki Gal, Gali Atari and various Israeli bands. It was also a hit (450,000 viewers) and achieved cult film status in Israel. In 1980 Nesher directed HaPakhdanim (Hebrew: "הפחדנים", lit. The Cowards), a moderate commercial success (120,000 viewers).

In 1984, Nesher wrote, directed and produced the film Rage and Glory which tells the story of the underground Zionist group Lehi and their struggle against the British Mandate in the 1940s. The film stars Juliano Mer, Hana Azoulay-Hasfari, and Roni Finkovitz. The movie caused a political storm, was lauded by international critics and in 2001 was selected by the Lincoln Center Film Society as one of the most important films in fifty years of Israeli cinema.

In 1985, Nesher produced Shovrim, about a group of youngsters making a Rock opera parody film of the biblical story of David and Goliath.

After seeing Rage and Glory, producer Dino De Laurentis convinced Nesher to come to Hollywood. Consequently, Nesher wrote and directed the sci-fi mystery Timebomb for MGM (produced by Rafaella De Laurentiis) and starring Michael Biehn. In 1993 he directed Doppelganger for 20th Century Fox, starring Drew Barrymore. Both films won prizes at the Avoriaz Science Fiction and Fantasy Festival in France.

In 1998, Nesher wrote, produced and directed the independent feature Taxman the story of tax investigator Al Benjamin (played by Joe Pantoliano) who stumbles over a series of bloody murders and gets involved in an investigation with a rookie cop. The New York Times called the film "A delight...a charmer of a mystery" and Jeffrey Lyons of NBC called it "A cinematic gem...Not to be missed!"

In 2002, he directed for Miramax/Dimension the horror film Ritual starring Jennifer Grey and Tim Curry.

In 2004, Nesher directed, produced and wrote Turn Left at the End of the World, a film about a small town in the Negev during the 1960s and the struggle of the Moroccan and Indian Jews who live there. The film starred Neta Garty, Liraz Cherki, and Ruby Porat-Shoval. The movie was nominated for 8 Israeli Academy awards and won three.

In 2005, Nesher directed the experimental political documentary Oriental about the Camp David Accords and won the "Spirit of Freedom" award at the Jerusalem Film Festival. It was described as "brilliant and original" by The Jerusalem Post, which called Nesher "Israel's most innovative filmmaker."

In 2007, Nesher's "The Secrets" premiered at the Toronto International Film Festival. Reviewers wrote that it was "witty and wise, sensual and emotionally overpowering." "The Secrets" was shown at more than 50 international film festivals. American film critic Andrew Sarris called it "one of the best movies of the year".

In 2010 Nesher wrote, directed and produced The Matchmaker. Inspired by Amir Gutfreund's novel When Heroes Fly, the film is set in Haifa in 1968. It tells the story of an Israeli teenager who gets a summer job working for a Holocaust survivor who runs a matchmaking service. The Matchmaker premiered at the 2010 Toronto Film Festival and later that year won the Silver Plaque award at the Chicago International Film Festival. When it opened in U.S. theaters Los Angeles Times film critic, Kenneth Turan hailed it as "beautiful and honest."

In 2013, Nesher's film The Wonders was praised by film critic Yair Raveh (Cinemascope) who called it the best Israeli movie of the year. It premiered at the Toronto International Film Festival and was selected as one of five exceptional films featured in the Contemporary World Speakers program. Variety film critic Alissa Simon hailed it a "smart, stylish, and sophisticated dramedy."

In 2016, Nesher wrote, directed and produced the post-war family drama "Past Life", which is set in Israel's revolutionary year of 1977 and is based on true events (inspired by Dr. Baruch Milch's autobiography "Can Heaven Be Void?")."Past Life" was an official selection at Toronto International Film Festival 16' ("Profoundly moving, suspenseful, gripping character-driven drama with hauntingly beautiful music" - Variety), and also the closing night at the Haifa International Film Festival ("An explosion of sheer emotional and cinematic virtuosity" – Cinemascope). In its long theatrical run in Israel, "Past Life" was a resounding success, receiving excellent reviews and close to 300,000 spectators. It was nominated for 5 Ophir Awards (the Israeli Oscars) including Best Actress and Original Score. Internationally the film was bought and distributed by the Samuel Goldwyn Company and by MGM/Orion.

In 2018 Nesher released The Other Story. The film premiered at the 2018 Toronto Film Festival "The Other Story", which is based on a true story and was written by Nesher and his co-writer and known psychologist Noam Shpancer, was the most viewed Israeli film of 2018 and granted Nesher the Best Director Award from The Israeli Film Critic Association.

In 2018 Avi Nesher won a Lifetime Achievement Award from the Israeli Ministry of Culture and Sports.

In 2021, his film "Image of Victory" was nominated for 15 Israel Academy Awards and won in the best cinematography, best costume design, and best makeup categories. Avi himself was awarded the Academy of Israeli Motion Pictures Excellence Award.

On 17 December 2021, Israel's National theater awarded Nesher its prestigious "Cultural Icon" Award.

In 2022, Nesher wrote and directed "The Monkey House", which was released in September 2023. In July 2023, the Israeli Academy of Film and Television awarded "The Monkey House" 11 nominations for the Ophir Award (including Ophir Award for Best Director).

== Personal life ==
He is married to the Israeli artist, Irish Nesher, whom he met when she was an extra on his 1984 film, Rage and Glory.

In 2018, Nesher's seventeen-year-old son, Ari, was killed in a hit and run by driver, Manamto Asefa in Tel Aviv.

His daughter, Tom Nesher, is also a film director who won an Ophir Awards for her film Come Closer.

== Awards and recognition ==
In 2008, Nesher received the Extraordinary Achievement Award at the Jerusalem Film Festival. In 2009 he won the Cinematic Excellence Award at the Haifa Film Festival and was accorded a star on "The Avenue of the Stars" - an honor rarely bestowed on directors. In 2010 Nesher received the Landau Award for Excellence in the Arts. In 2017, Nesher received the Outstanding Achievement Award from the Israeli National Association of Theatres Owners, their highest award for cinematic box-office success.

- Director award, Avoriaz Fantastic Film Festival 1992
- Director award, Taromina Film Festival 2004
- Spirit of Freedom award, Jerusalem Film Festival 2005
- Best screenplay, Jackson Hole Film Festival 2007
- Lifetime achievement award, Israeli Film Festival 2007
- Extraordinary Achievement Award at the Jerusalem Film Festival 2008
- Lifetime achievement award, Washington Jewish Film Festival 2010
- Landau award for cinematic excellence 2010
- Outstanding Achievement Award for Box Office Success 2017
- Best Director Award, Israeli Film Critic Association 2018
- Torchbearer in the national Israeli Independence Day ceremony, 2019
- Lifetime Achievement Award, Israeli Ministry of Culture and Sport 2018
- Excellence Award, Academy of Israeli Motion Pictures, 2021
- Lifetime Achievement Award at the Haifa International Film Festival, 2026

== Filmography ==
Year	Title	Language	Notes
1979	HaLahaka	Hebrew	Director, Producer
1979	Dizengoff 99	Hebrew	Director
1980	The Cowards	Hebrew	Director
1982	She	English	Director
1985	Shovrim (Breaking)	Hebrew	Producer
1985	Rage and Glory	Hebrew	Director, Writer, Producer
1991	Time Bomb	English	Director, Writer
1993	Doppelganger	English	Director
1996	Savage	English	Director
1998	Taxman	English	Director, Writer, Producer
2000	Raw Nerve	English	Director
2002	Ritual	English	Director
2004	Sof Haolam Smola (Turn Left at the End of the World)	Hebrew	Director, Writer, Producer
2005	Oriental	Hebrew	Documentary
2007	Hasodot	Hebrew	Director, Writer
2010	Pa'am Haitty (The Matchmaker)	Hebrew	Director, Writer, Producer
2013	The Wonders	Hebrew	Director
2016	Past Life	Hebrew	Director, Writer, Producer
2018	The Other Story	Hebrew	Director, Writer
2021	Image of Victory	Hebrew	Director
2023	Gan Kofim (The Monkey House)	Hebrew	Director, Writer
2026	Our Loves	Hebrew	Director, writer
