= Yona Atari =

Israeli singer and actress (1933–2019)

- יונה עטרי
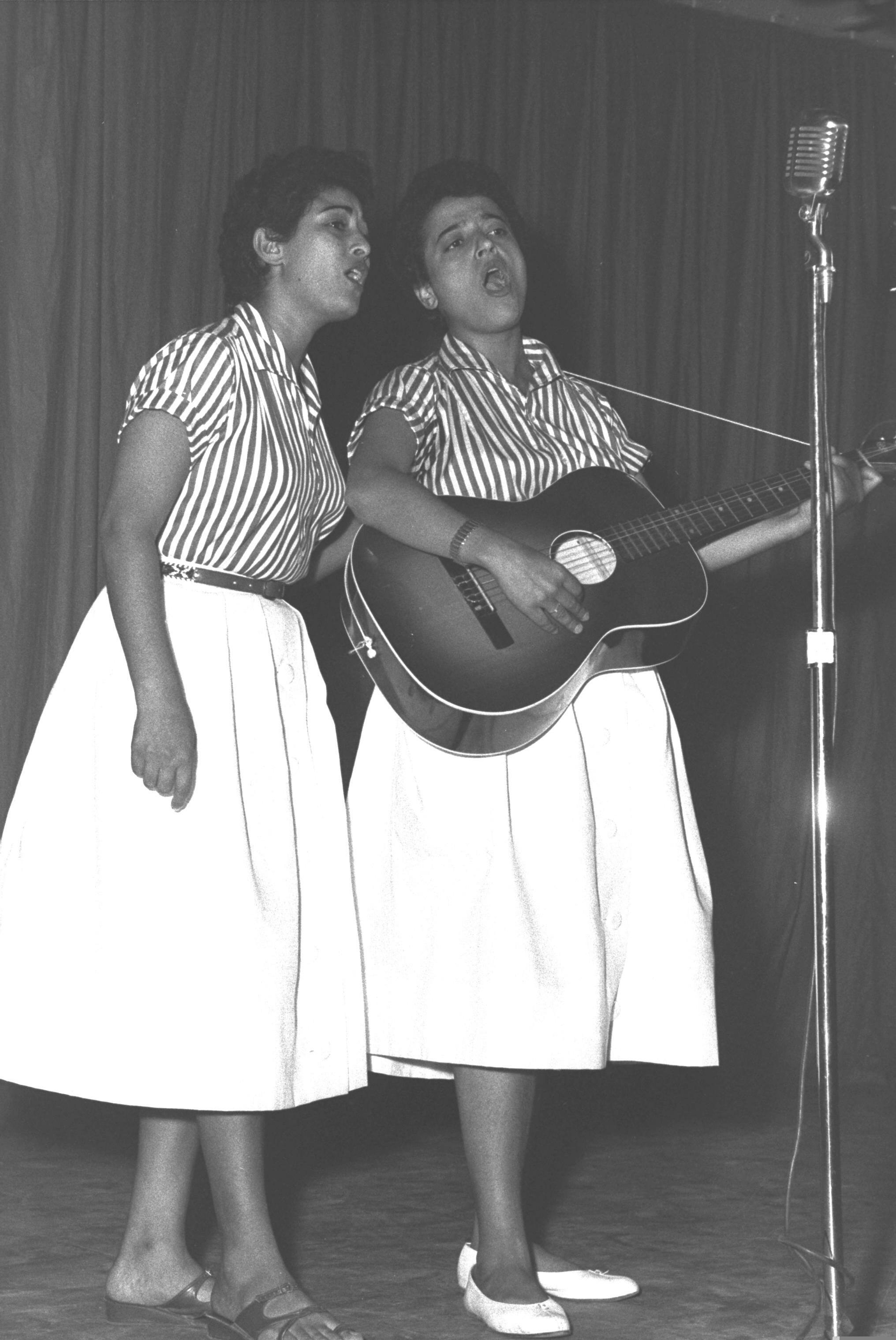
- Atari (left) with Matty Enav in 1958
- Born: 4 December 1933; Sanaa, Yemen
- Died: 11 March 2019 (aged 85); Tel Aviv, Israel
- Occupations: Singer; actress
- Years active: 1949–2009
- Spouse: Uri Yaffe (m. 1960; died 2012)
- Children: 2
- Relatives: Shosh Atari (sister); Gali Atari (sister)

Yona Atari (Hebrew: יונה עטרי; 4 December 1933 – 11 March 2019) was an Israeli singer and actress.

== Biography ==
Born in Sana'a and the first out of eight children, Atari and her family moved to Israel when she was three months old. She was brought up in Rehovot. Atari was sent by her mother to study music and theatre but her father forbade this since these pastimes were considered to be idolatry. At the age of 15, Atari moved to Tel Aviv where she resided in Kerem HaTeimanim under the guidance of Nahum Nardi who introduced her to Esther Gamlielit. In 1950, she joined up with the Nahal Troupe and between 1951 and 1955, she studied acting at the Habima Theatre.

In 1957, Atari joined up with Batzal Yarok before starring in a play written by Haim Hefer and Dahn Ben-Amotz. She also participated in a theatrical adaption of Sammy Gronemann’s King Solomon and the Shoemaker alongside Rachel Attas and Illi Gorlitzky in 1964. She teamed up with the latter once again and they performed the song Concertina and a Guitar. Atari began to focus more of her attention on acting and starred in adaptations of The Dybbuk, Medea, The Threepenny Opera and more.

On television, Atari was a prominent cast member on Rechov Sumsum, the Israeli adaptation of the U.S. children's show Sesame Street, from 1983 until 1987.

=== Personal life ===
Atari was the older sister of radio personality Shosh Atari and singer Gali Atari. She was married to El Al and Air Force pilot Uri Yaffe from 1960 until his death on June 10, 2012. They had two children, Dana and Oren.

== Death ==
Atari died on 11 March 2019, in Tel Aviv following complications from Alzheimer's disease at the age of 85. Her coffin was put on display at the Cameri Theatre for the funeral service before being laid to rest at Yarkon Cemetery.
