= Wonderland (2013 film) =

- פלאות
- Directed by: Avi Nesher
- Written by: Avi Nesher; Shanan Street
- Starring: Adir Miller; Uri Hezekiah; Yehuda Levi
- Cinematography: Michel Abramowicz
- Edited by: Itzhak Tzhayek
- Music by: Avner Dorman
- Distributed by: United Kings Films
- Release date: June 6, 2013
- Running time: 112 minutes
- Country: Israel
- Language: Hebrew

Wonderland (Hebrew: פלאות, romanized: Plaot, lit. Wonders), also known as The Wonders, is an Israeli film directed by Avi Nesher from 2013. It is a comic thriller and tribute to the genre of film noir.

== Plot ==
Ariel Navon (Uri Hezekiah), who goes by the nickname Rabbit, is a young Hiloni who lives and works as a bartender in Jerusalem. With him is his former partner, Vax (Efrat Gosh) who is in the process of becoming more religious. At nights, Rabbit paints graffiti and covers his face to avoid the police. One evening, Rabbit sees three religious men bringing a covered figure into an abandoned building opposite his apartment window. The next day, he meets a private investigator named Jacob Ghitis (Adir Miller), who wishes to use a Rabbit's apartment for a view of the abandoned building. Rabbit swings between refusal and acceptance and finally agrees to allow the investigator to install a hidden camera in his apartment. The film was influenced by an incident where popular religious Israeli figure, Rabbi Nir Ben-Artzi, disappeared from the public for three years.

== Production ==
Avi Nesher met with Shanan Street, the lead singer of Hadag Nahash, to include his songs in the soundtrack of a film he planned to release. During their acquaintance, the Jerusalem-based Street showed Nesher unique characters and places in Jerusalem, and in this context, Nesher came up with the idea of writing a joint script centered around Jerusalem and the characters surrounding it. Although Street had no experience writing scripts, he agreed to the offer.

The character of "Arnav" is based somewhat on Street's own life, and according to him, the bar he works at and the characters around him are similar to Street's past works. Despite this, they decided that he would not be a musical artist, but a painter and graffiti artist.

== A Tribute to the "Film Noir Style ==
Film noir (dark film) is a style of filmmaking characterized by shadowy lighting (and sometimes black and white photography), a nihilistic world, a cynical and gloomy protagonist who often plays a detective or private investigator, injustice, a femme fatale, and unconventional camera angles. Wonders is a tribute to the film noir films that began appearing in the 1940s.

Wonders has many of these characteristics, the rabbit (Uri Hezekiah) is reminiscent of L. B. Jeffries from Hitchcock's Rear Window. Similar to Wonders, in Rear Window the protagonist watches from his window at his neighbors and discovers dark secrets about them. Jacob Gittis (Adir Miller) is reminiscent of the character of Jake (Jacob) Gittis from Polanski's Chinatown, a tough and cynical former detective who pursues justice in an unjust world. Jacob's attire, a coat and hat, is reminiscent of the attire of many characters from film noir films, for example Walter Neff (Double Life Insurance) or John Ferguson (Vertigo). Jacob's controlled and tough style matches that of film noir detectives. The character of Ella (Yuval Sharaf) is the character of the femme fatale (Pam Patel). A beautiful and passionate woman who hides dark secrets from her past.

Similar to films such as The Maltese Falcon, Chinatown or Vertigo, the femme fatale who hides dark secrets hires the services of a tough private detective. As the plot unfolds, the true motives of the femme fatale become clear, as the detective continues his investigation and pursues justice beyond the confines of his job. Additionally, similar to films like Rear Window or Blue Velvet, a seemingly innocent protagonist driven by curiosity independently investigates the events and becomes entangled in a complex and dangerous affair.

== Cast ==
| Actor Name | Character Name | Role |
|---|---|---|
| Uri Hezekiah | Rabbit (Hebrew: ארנב) / Ariel Navon | A Jerusalem bartender and graffiti artist who rents his apartment to Detective Gittis for observation. |
| Adir Miller | Yaakov Gittis | A tough private investigator, formerly a police officer. A tribute to the character of Jake Gittis from the movie Chinatown. He lives alone, his wife left him because she became more religious, his two children don't talk to him except for one who meets him secretly from time to time. |
| Yehuda Levy | Rav Shaya Knafo | A rabbi, perhaps powerful, perhaps a crook, who suddenly disappears. His character is based somewhat on Rabbi Nir Ben Artzi. |
| Yuval Scharf | Ella Gorski | The sister of Rabbi Knafo's wife. Beautiful and mysterious, she hires the services of Yaakov Gittis. |
| Efrat Gosh | Vax | Arnav's ex-girlfriend, who works with him at the bar as a waitress. |
| Shanan Street | Cafe Owner | Haredi, owner of the neighborhood cafe. |
| Gavri Banay | Kavilio | A regular customer at the pub where Arnav works. He drinks alcohol and gets a little drunk, wants to establish all sorts of associations to reduce alcohol prices and all sorts of other things, and uses the initials of the names of the associations he wants to establish. |
