= Rage and Glory =

- Original film poster in Hebrew
- זעם ותהילה
- Directed by: Avi Nesher
- Written by: Avi Nesher
- Produced by: Avi Nesher
- Starring: Juliano Mer Rona Frid Yigal Naor
- Music by: Rami Kleinstein
- Release date: 1984
- Running time: 118 minutes
- Language: Hebrew
- Budget: $900,000

Rage and Glory is a 1984 Israeli historical drama film written and directed by Avi Nesher, and starring Juliano Mer, Rona Frid, Yigal Naor. It follows a group of Lehi fighters in the early 1940s and led by Eddie (Mer).

The film was released in Israel in November 1984. Upon its release, during the First Lebanon War is provoked controversy from both the left and the right in Israel. However, it was acclaimed by foreign film critics.

In 2017, The Jerusalem Cinematheque's Israel Film Archive digitally restored the film. The new version premiered at the Jerusalem Jewish Film Festival in December 2017.

== Film production ==
This is Avi Nesher's fifth film, it recreates the actions of the Jerusalem Lehi cell in March 1942, shortly after the murder of "Yair" by the British mandate authorities. The film was shot between January and May 1984.

The script was written after interviews with Lehi fighters, especially David Shomron and Anshel Shpilman. Yitzhak Shamir also participated in the consultations. Real events were recreated, such as the distribution of leaflets, the kidnapping and murder of Alex Rubovitz, a military trial and execution by hanging, an underground broadcast, an attempt on the life of a British commander, and others. The film had a budget of about a million dollars and was in production for a year. For the production of the film, the details of that period were carefully restored: the basement apartments with almost no furniture in which the underground lived, the headquarters of the British police, the lifestyle and clothes in Jerusalem in the 1940s, Lehi posters, British army uniforms brought specially from England, military trucks and weapons of that period. The actors voluntarily locked themselves up for three months in one apartment in order to personally learn the nature of the life of the underground.

The film pays considerable attention to explaining the motives of the rebels, whose goal was to fight the treacherous, in their opinion, policy of the British authorities, which prevented the escape and rescue of Jews from the Holocaust in Europe. This British policy violated the main condition of the British Mandate received from the League of Nations - the creation of Jewish National Home and a refuge for Jews from persecution in the Diaspora. Despite this, the British Mandatory authorities denied asylum to Jews from 1939 to 1948, including during the Nazi genocide, the mass planned murder of 6 million Jews.

The credits at the beginning of the film mention that with the outbreak of war, the main Jewish military organizations, the Haganah and the Irgun, ceased their anti-British underground activities and joined the British war effort against Germany. Most of the Jewish population did not realize the scope of the Holocaust in Europe and the urgency of overcoming the British blockade of Jewish refugees. Lehi fighters are forced to fight the British authorities alone, surrounded by a wall of exclusion.

The film caused great controversy in Israel during the Lebanon War (Nesher was even accused of legitimizing terrorism), but, on the other hand, the film was recognized and appreciated at film festivals around the world, in the eyes of critics and film professionals. In the US, it is considered one of the most stylish action films ever made. During the production of the film, the actor Juliano Mer was wounded by shrapnel from a blank bullet, director Avi Nesher replaced him in the filming of the police station explosion scene. A few months later, after Mer's recovery, they added close-up shots of the scene.

== Plot ==
The film begins with an underground Lehi broadcast by Daphne (Khana Azulai) from a building basement in Jerusalem, where the commander of the Jerusalem branch, Melnik (Yigal Naor) and broadcaster Slonim (Lior Nachman), are located.

The date is March 14, 1942, about a month after the assassination of Avraham Stern. Lehi HQ sends Eddie "The Butcher" (Juliano Mer), a fearless fighter, to Jerusalem to shake up the passive cell and kill the British commander in Jerusalem.

Also among the cell's fighters is Noah Kaplan (Roni Pinkovich), a 19-year-old high school graduate. He is in love with his high school girlfriend Angela Sasson (Rona Frid). Noah arrives at a dance party attended by British soldiers. Angela introduces Noah to her father (Jacques Cohen) and mother (Gaby Aldor), but they disapprove of her relationship with Noah.

The British arrest Shimon Rubovitz (Yahli Bergman) while distributing leaflets. He is tortured to death by interrogator Garwin (John Phillips), but does not name his friends.

Eddie plans to kill the British commander. The explosives are being prepared by "Pinocchio" (Tovia Gelber) and should explode when the command vehicle enters the fortified base. The explosive fails to detonate, the plan goes awry, however the fighter Alex (Dudu Yafet) still desperately opens fire, followed by the rest of the attackers. The British open heavy fire and hit Alex. The fighters retreat with the wounded, but their hiding place is betrayed by an informant. The British rush there and capture Alex. He appears before a British court-martial and delivers a fiery speech against the British government's treacherous policy of preventing Jewish rescue from the Holocaust by blocking them from escaping to the Land of Israel. Alex is sentenced to death by a British court, defiantly refuses a petition for clemency, and is executed by the British on the gallows. "Pinocchio" manages to escape to the apartment of his girlfriend Yael (Segal Cohen), who takes care of him and cheers him up.

Noah and Angela marry in secret. Her father eventually decides to sell his factory and emigrate to the United States, and Angela informs Noah that she must leave with her parents.

Eddie prepares an attack on the British base by planting a bomb on a captured British truck full of Lehi fighters dressed as British soldiers. They manage to infiltrate the British base in a truck, but are recognized. A long, bitter battle ensues, in which Eddie and all of Lehi's attackers are killed except for Noah, who manages to escape. The car explodes and wreaks havoc.

Noah is caught six weeks later, sentenced to life in prison and released with the establishment of the State of Israel.

== Cast ==
Player name	character name
Juliano Mer	Eddie "The Butcher"
Ronnie Pinkovich	Noah Kaplan
Yigal Naor	Miller
Hana Azulai	Daphne
Rona Frid	Angela Sasson
Jacques Cohen	Mr Sasson
Gaby Eldor	Ms Sasson
Tobia Gelber	"Pinocchio"
Lior Nachman	Slonim
Dudu Yaphet	Alex
Yali Bergman	Shimon
John Phillips	Garvin
Sigal Cohen	Yael
Yael Dar	Niva
Joseph Bee	Martin
Muni Yosef	Elnakam
Barry Langford	Colonel Kane
Danny Friedman	Langer

== Reception ==
The film won critical acclaim overseas while being controversial in Israel for its subject content and release during the First Lebanon War.

== See also ==
- Abandonment of the Jews
- War Refugee Board
- White Paper of 1939
