= Rona De Ricci =

Actress

- De Ricci in The Pit and the Pendulum (1991)
- Born: June 15, 1961; Italy
- Died: 30 June 2020 (aged 59); Cologne, Germany
- Occupation: Actress
- Spouse: Cosimo M. Carafa (m. 1993; sep. 2015)
- Children: 2

Rona De Ricci (June 15, 1961 – June 30, 2020) was an Italian-American actress known for her roles in The Penitent (1988) and The Pit and the Pendulum (1991). She was also credited as Rona Freed and Rona Frid in some works.

== Early life and education ==
De Ricci was born in Italy on June 15, 1961. In 1984, she moved to the United States and attended the Lee Strasberg Theatre and Film Institute in New York City from 1984 to 1986. She obtained U.S. citizenship in the late 1980s.

== Career ==
De Ricci began her acting career with a supporting role in the Israeli film Rage and Glory (1984), credited as Rona Frid (sometimes spelled Freed). She appeared (again as Rona Freed) in The Penitent (1988) as Celia Guerola, alongside Raúl Juliá and Armand Assante. In 1988, she featured in the Fleetwood Mac music video for the song "As Long as You Follow". Her most notable role was as Maria in The Pit and the Pendulum (1991), directed by Stuart Gordon, in which she appeared fully nude. Dissatisfied with subsequent roles, she retired from acting after this film.

== Personal life ==
In 1993 De Ricci married Cosimo M. Carafa, and together they started a roofing business in California. They had two sons, born in 2000 and 2004. The couple separated in 2015, and De Ricci filed for divorce, which was never finalized. In 2018, she relocated to Zündorf, near Cologne, Germany. Estranged from her family and unable to find employment, she wrote her autobiography, Truth & Dare, published in June 2020.

== Death ==
De Ricci committed suicide on June 30, 2020, in Cologne, Germany. Minutes before it happened, she posted a note on her Instagram page (@thehumanrevolution2020) but it has since been taken down, presumably by her family.

== Filmography ==
- Rage and Glory (1984) – Angela (credited as Rona Frid)
- The Penitent (1988) – Celia Guerola (credited as Rona Freed)
- The Pit and the Pendulum (1991) – Maria
