= Hallelujah (Milk and Honey song) =

1979 song by Milk and Honey

Single by Milk and Honey

from the album Milk & Honey With Gali
- Language: Hebrew
- B-side: "Lady Sun"
- Released: 1979
- Genre: Pop
- Length: 3:27
- Label: Polydor
- Composer: Kobi Oshrat
- Lyricist: Shimrit Orr
- Producer: Shlomo Zach

Milk and Honey singles chronology
"Hallelujah" (1979)	"Goodbye New York" (1979)

Eurovision Song Contest 1979 entry
- Country: Israel
- Artists: Gali Atari; Shmulik Bilu; Reuven Gvirtz; Yehuda Tamir
- As: Milk and Honey
- Conductor: Kobi Oshrat

Finals performance
- Final result: 1st
- Final points: 125

Entry chronology
- ◄ "A-Ba-Ni-Bi" (1978)
- "Halayla" (1981) ►

Official performance video
- "Hallelujah" on YouTube

"Hallelujah" (Hebrew: הללויה) is a song recorded by Israeli band Milk and Honey with music composed by Kobi Oshrat and Hebrew lyrics written by Shimrit Orr. It represented Israel in the Eurovision Song Contest 1979 held in Jerusalem, winning the contest.

== Background ==
=== Conception ===
"Hallelujah" was composed by Kobi Oshrat with Hebrew lyrics by Shimrit Or. In 1978, Oshrat originally submitted the song to the national selection the Israeli Broadcasting Authority (IBA) organized to select its song and performer for the 23rd edition of the Eurovision Song Contest. The song was rejected as "the selection committee did not think 'Hallelujah' was strong enough". It was also rejected by song festivals in Chile and Japan.

=== National Selection 1979 ===
However, in 1979, IBA accepted the song for its national selection for the 24th edition of the Eurovision Song Contest, where it was intended to be performed by the band Hakol Over Habibi. Hakol Over Habibi, nevertheless, declined the opportunity to sing it because the lead singer Shlomit Aharon declared she did not want to go to Eurovision.

After they decided to withdraw the song, the national final producers wanted Gali Atari to perform it instead. The group Milk and Honey was then formed especially for the national selection around Atari, giving her the company of the three male vocalists Shmulik Bilu, Reuven Gvirtz, and Yehuda Tamir, so that the group had the same number of singers and gender composition as Hakol Over Habibi. The song only narrowly won the national Israeli selection with 63 points, only two more points than "Ein li ish milvadi", performed by Tzvika Pick, - who later composed the 1998 Eurovision winning song "Diva". It became the Israeli entrant – and Milk and Honey the performers – for Eurovision.

In addition to the Hebrew original version, they recorded the song in English – with lyrics by Shimrit Orr, French – with lyrics by Michel Jourdan and Shimrit Orr, and German –with lyrics by Fini Busch.

=== Eurovision ===
On 31 March 1979, the Eurovision Song Contest was held at the International Convention Center in Jerusalem hosted by IBA and broadcast live throughout the continent. Milk and Honey performed "Hallelujah" tenth on the night –entering the stage one by one rather than all together–, following West Germany's "Dschinghis Khan" by Dschinghis Khan and preceding France's "Je suis l'enfant soleil" by Anne-Marie David. Kobi Oshrat conducted the event's live orchestra in the performance of the Israeli entry.

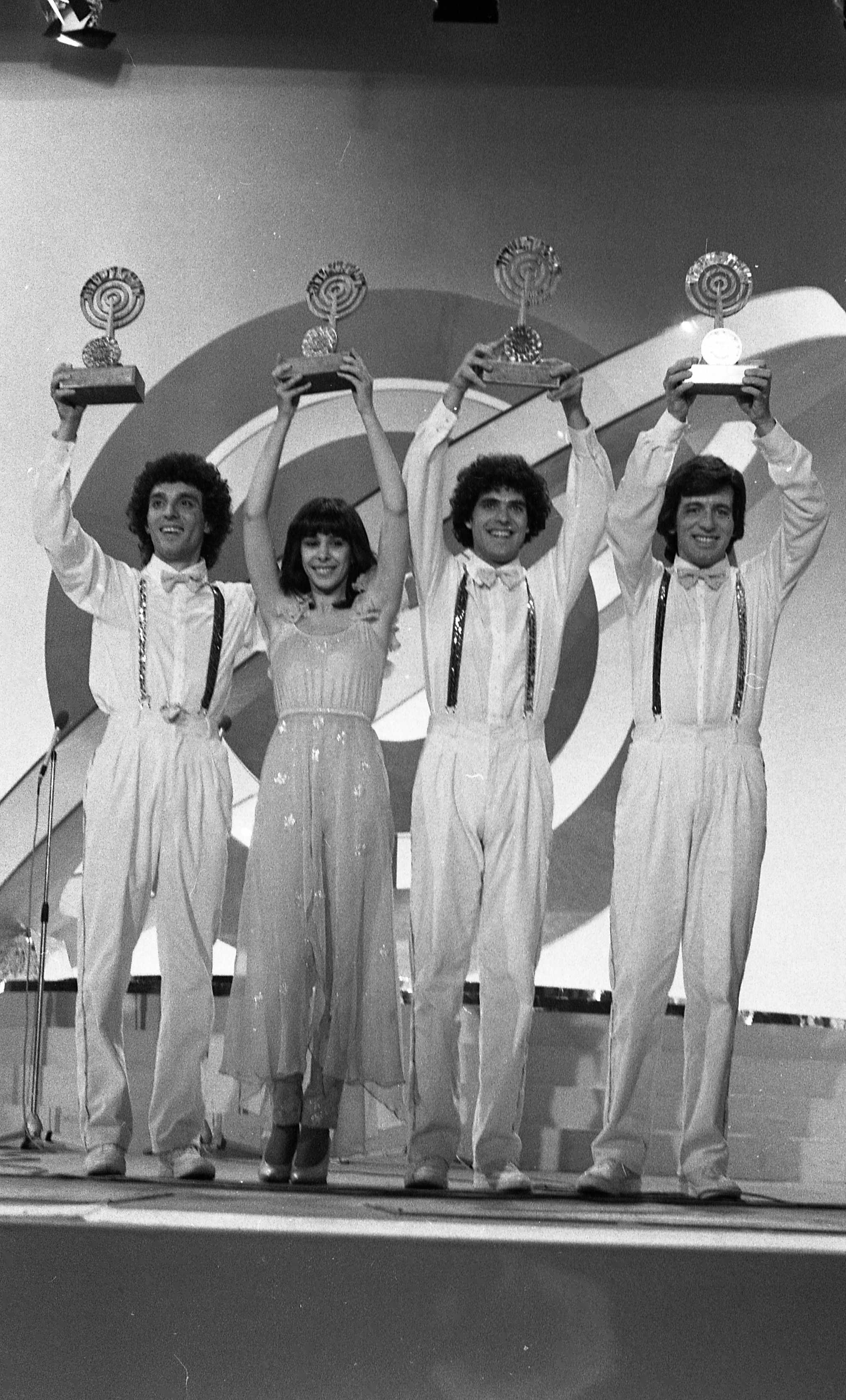
Milk and Honey (left to right: Bilu, Atari, Gvirtz, Tamir) show their winners' trophies.

At the close of voting, it had received 125 points, placing first in a field of nineteen, winning the contest. As Spain had been leading on the penultimate round of voting, this was the first time the winning song had come from behind to clinch victory on the final vote. The last jury to vote was the Spanish one, who gave the contest to Israel, relegating "Su canción" by Betty Missiego to second position.

This was the fourth occasion on which the host country had won the contest – Switzerland, Spain and Luxembourg had achieved the feat before this – and there have since been two more such occasions to date –Ireland winning once in Millstreet and once more in Dublin. The song was succeeded as contest winner in the 1980 contest by "What's Another Year" by Johnny Logan for Ireland.

=== Aftermath ===
Israel could neither host nor compete in Eurovision in 1980, which was scheduled for the same day as Yom Hazikaron, Israel's Memorial Day: the festivities of the event would clash with the somber tone of the day, which is marked in Israel with memorial services, two minutes of silence, and large numbers of visitors at military and civilian cemeteries. It returned to the fold for the 1981 contest with "Halayla" by Hakol Over Habibi.

On 22 August 1981, Milk and Honey (Note: Atari was replaced by Leah Lupatin.) performed their song in the Eurovision twenty-fifth anniversary concert Songs of Europe held in Mysen. On 29 May 1999, in the Eurovision Song Contest 1999 held in Jerusalem all the contestants performed the song after the winning reprise as a tribute to the victims of the wars in the Balkans. On 22 October 2005, in the Eurovision fiftieth anniversary competition Congratulations: 50 Years of the Eurovision Song Contest held in Copenhagen, Atari performed the song as part of the interval acts. On 31 March 2015, in the Eurovision sixtieth anniversary concert Eurovision Song Contest's Greatest Hits held in London, Anne-Marie David performed the song as part of the closing medley. On 18 May 2019, in the 'Switch Song' interval act during the grand final of the Eurovision Song Contest 2019 held in Tel Aviv, Atari –who had refused to sing with her former Milk and Honey teammates– performed the song accompanied by Conchita Wurst, Måns Zelmerlöw, Eleni Foureira, and Verka Serduchka. The television special Eurovision: Europe Shine a Light, aired on 16 May 2020 throughout Europe, features Atari performing the song in an empty Old City of Jerusalem as a Zoom-style sing-along with finalists of the Junior Songfestival 2018 and 2019.

In 2018, to celebrate Israel's 70th year of independence, the Israeli Ministry of Culture and Sport released an updated version of the song. This version was sung by Atari and pop singer Eden Ben Zaken, and was performed at the official state ceremony in Jerusalem.

== Chart performance ==
=== Weekly charts ===
Chart (1979)	Peak position
Austria (Ö3 Austria Top 40)	15
Belgium (Ultratop 50 Flanders)	4
Finland	1
Ireland (IRMA)	1
Israel (IBA)	1
Netherlands (Dutch Top 40)	8
Netherlands (Single Top 100)	6
Norway (VG-lista)	1
Spain (Spanish Singles Chart)	22
Sweden (Sverigetopplistan)	1
Switzerland (Schweizer Hitparade)	2
UK Singles (OCC)	5
West Germany (GfK)	11

== Legacy ==
The husband-and-wife singing duo of Steve Lawrence and Eydie Gorme released the song in early 1979 on Warner Brothers Records. The song was a modest hit on the adult contemporary chart, and the couple also performed it on The Tonight Show Starring Johnny Carson. They also recorded a live version which was released on Applause Records in 1982.

In 1987, Oshrat's composition was covered by Marika Gombitová, Karel Gott and Josef Laufer, and recorded under the title "Hrajme píseň" ("Let's Play a Song") in Czechoslovakia. As a trio (featuring solo part performed by Czech actress Věra Galatíková), the song was presented on November 1, 1987, and with alternate lyrics by Zdeněk Borovec during the pre-filmed live show Abeceda: G+L created by Česká televize.

There is also an undocumented Polish version by Eleni Tzoka, recorded under title "Alleluja miłość twa".

== Bibliography ==
- Graclík, Miroslav; Nekvapil, Václav (2008). Marika Gombitová: neautorizovaný životní příběh legendy československé pop music [Marika Gombitová: An Unauthorized Life Story of the Legend of Czechoslovak Pop Music] (in Czech). Prague, Czech Republic: XYZ. ISBN 978-80-7388-115-3. OCLC 294939865.
- Lehotský, Oskar (April 23, 2008a). Slovak Popular Music in the Years 1977–1989 – Marika Gombitová (PDF) (in Slovak). Bratislava, Slovakia: Comenius University, Faculty of Arts. Archived from the original (PDF) on 2014-07-14.

Preceded by "A-Ba-Ni-Bi" by Izhar Cohen & Alphabeta	Eurovision Song Contest winners 1979	Succeeded by "What's Another Year" by Johnny Logan
