= Yehuda Levy =

Israeli publisher

Colonel Yehuda Levy (Hebrew: יהודה לוי) served as the president and publisher of the Israeli English daily newspaper The Jerusalem Post.

== Overview ==
Levy served as a Jewish National Fund emissary in Vancouver, Canada, where he befriended Hollinger president David Radler. After representing Hollinger during its purchase of The Jerusalem Post from Koor and Bank Hapoalim in 1989, Levy was appointed the paper's president and publisher, posts he held until 1997. In that time, Yehuda Levy turned the Jerusalem Post into a profitable company and raised the circulation of its titles. Before his work at the Jewish National Fund, he served 25 years in the Israel Defense Forces.

Levy died in his sleep at the age of 64 in Jerusalem on January 26, 2000.
