= Kobi Oshrat =

Israeli composer and conductor (born 1944)

Kobi Oshrat קובי אשרת
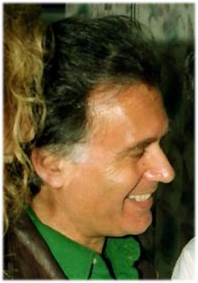

Background information
- Born: Yaakov Ventura יעקב ונטורה; July 15, 1944 (age 82); Haifa, Mandatory Palestine
- Origin: Haifa, Israel
- Genres: Israeli rock, Israeli pop
- Instrument: Electric guitar
- Formerly of: Northern Command Band, Milk and Honey

Kobi Oshrat (Hebrew: קובי אשרת; born July 15, 1944) is an Israeli composer and conductor. He composed and conducted the winning entry at the Eurovision Song Contest 1979 "Hallelujah" sung by the vocal ensemble Milk and Honey.

== Biography ==
Yaakov (Kobi) Ventura (later Kobi Oshrat) was born in Haifa to parents who had immigrated from Salonika. After an early career on the Israeli stage, in 1969 he began composing and arranging music for radio, TV, film and advertisements, with his first hit arriving that same year. Oshrat achieved international fame when his composition, "Hallelujah", sung by the Israeli group Milk and Honey, won the Eurovision Song Contest 1979. Oshrat has written more than 1000 songs, but "Hallelujah" is his most famous, with 400 cover versions of it around the world.

Oshrat also composed and conducted the 1985 and 1992 Israeli entries. He conducted the 1987 and 1991 Israeli entries but did not write the music for them.

== See also ==
- Music of Israel
