= Milk and Honey (Israeli group) =

Israeli vocal group

Milk and Honey חלב ודבש
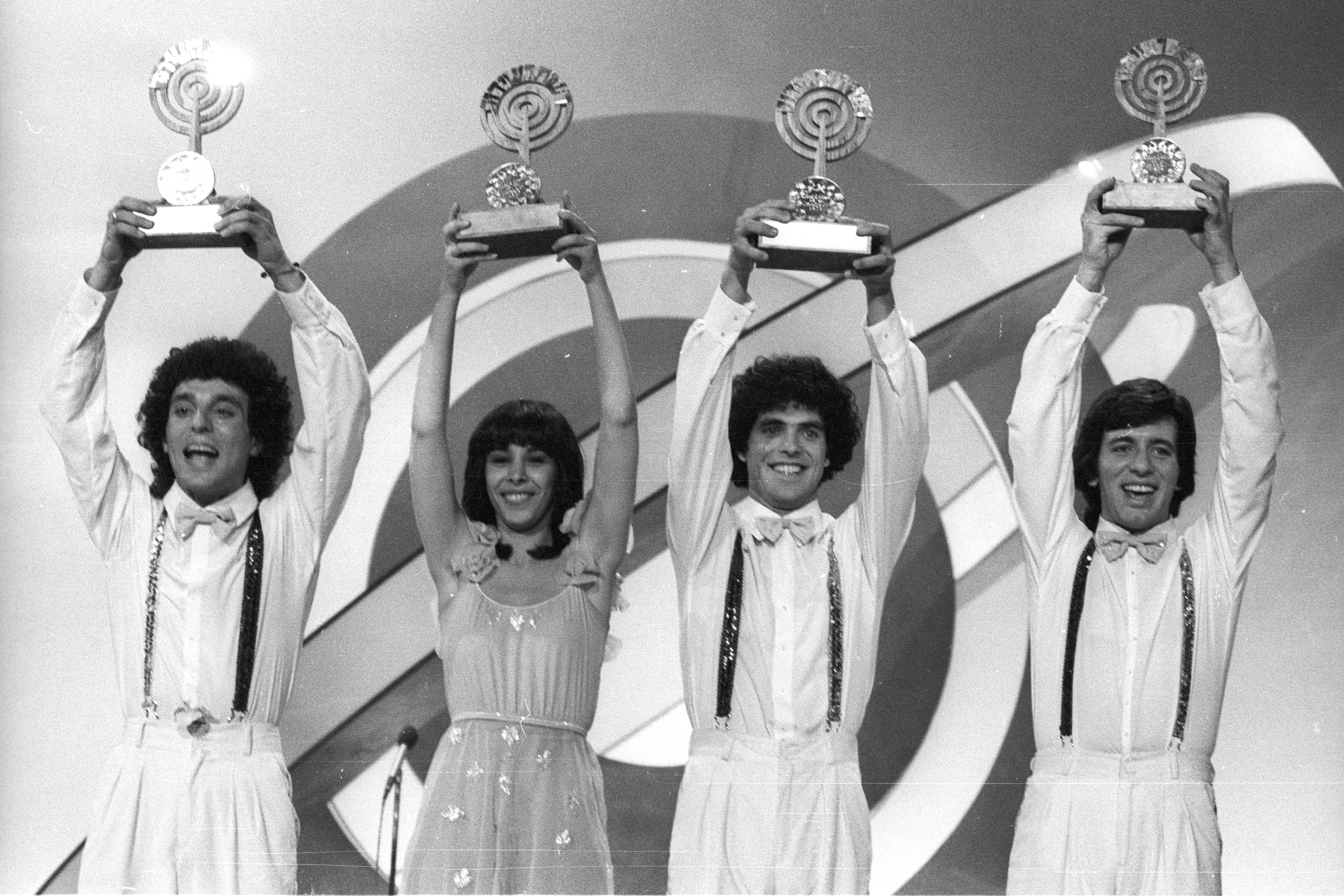
- The group holding their Eurovision trophies

Background information
- Origin: Israel
- Genre: Pop
- Years active: 1979–1983; 1987; 1989; 2001; 2009; 2017
- Members: Reuven Gvirtz; Yehuda Tamir; Leah Lupatin
- Past members: Shmulik Bilu; Gali Atari

Milk and Honey (Hebrew: חלב ודבש, romanized: Khalav U'Dvash) was an Israeli vocal group. The original line-up consisted of Shmulik Bilu, Reuven Gvirtz, Yehuda Tamir, and Gali Atari. They won the Eurovision Song Contest 1979 for Israel with the song "Hallelujah".

== History ==
The group was assembled in 1978 by producer Shlomo Zach and composer Kobi Oshrat, after both Hakol Over Habibi and Yardena Arazi turned down the opportunity to perform Oshrat's song "Hallelujah" in the Israeli national selection for the Eurovision Song Contest 1979. Milk and Honey eventually won the national selection, and went on to also win the Eurovision Song Contest 1979. "Hallelujah" peaked in the UK Singles Chart at #5 in April 1979. The group had one other international hit, "Goodbye New York".

Less than a year after the song contest, Atari retired from Milk and Honey and was replaced by Leah Lupatin in 1981. The same year, Atari sued Zach for unpaid royalties; in 1994, an Israeli court ruled in Atari's favour, ordering Zach to pay the royalties. Subsequently, in 2003, Zach and his partners sued Oshrat, alleging that Oshrat should have also contributed to the payments made to Atari, as he was a partner in the group. That lawsuit was settled in 2009 through mediation.

Milk and Honey competed in the national final on two further occasions; they performed the song "Serenada" in 1981, coming fourth, and "Ani Ma'amin" in 1989, where they came eighth. Gvirtz and Tamir accompanied the Israeli song contest act in 1988.

Shmulik Bilu died at Ichilov Hospital in Tel Aviv on 31 December 2023, at the age of 71.

== See also ==
- Music of Israel

Awards and achievements
Preceded by (Israel) Izhar Cohen and the Alphabeta with "A-Ba-Ni-Bi"	Winner of the Eurovision Song Contest; 1979	Succeeded by (Republic of Ireland) Johnny Logan with "What's Another Year"
Preceded by Izhar Cohen and the Alphabeta with "A-Ba-Ni-Bi"	Israel in the Eurovision Song Contest; 1979	Succeeded by Hakol Over Habibi with "Halayla"
