= Shosh Atari =

- שוש עטרי
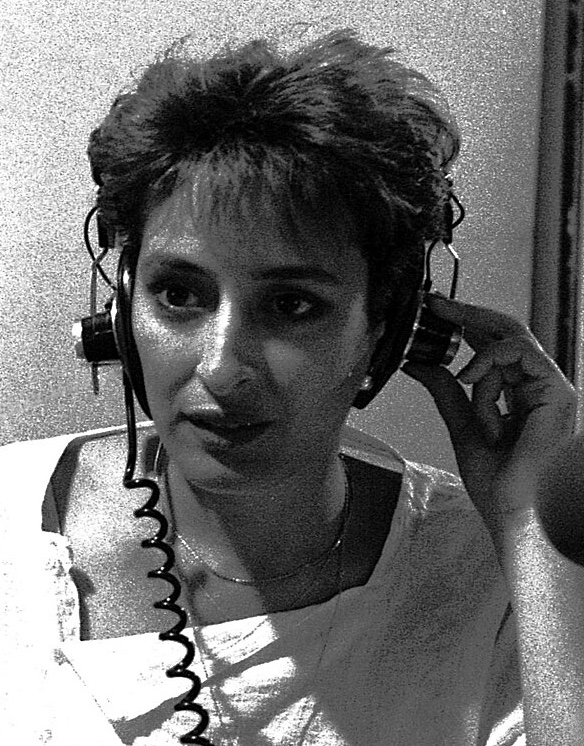
- Atari in 1983
- Born: Shoshana Atari; 24 November 1949; Rehovot, Israel
- Died: 1 April 2008 (aged 58); Tel Aviv, Israel
- Occupations: Radio presenter; television presenter; actress
- Years active: 1970–2008
- Relatives: Gali Atari (sister); Yona Atari (sister)

Shosh Atari (Hebrew: שוש עטרי; 24 November 1949 – 1 April 2008) was an Israeli radio presenter, television presenter and actress.

== Biography ==
Shoshana Atari was born in Rehovot. She was the sister of Gali Atari and Yona Atari.

In the 1970s Atari joined Kol Yisrael and in the 1980s she was one of the stars of Reshet Gimel, where she was the host of the music hit programs - "Chadash, Chadish, U-mechudash", "Lohet", and other programs edited by Tony Fine. Atari was also famous as the host of the popular TV game - Pitsuchim of the Israeli Educational Television channel. A few years ago, Atari had a kidney transplant operation after having a kidney disease. After the transplant she went to Reshet Gimel but got back to broadcasting a daily show in Radio Lev HaMedina. In 2007, Atari returned to television as a star of Hakol Dvash, a dramedy on Channel 2.

== Death ==
Atari died of a heart attack at her home on 1 April 2008. She was discovered by her two sisters. She was 58 years old, and buried at the Yarkon Cemetery.
