= Dani Litani =

Israeli musician and actor

Dani Litani דני ליטני
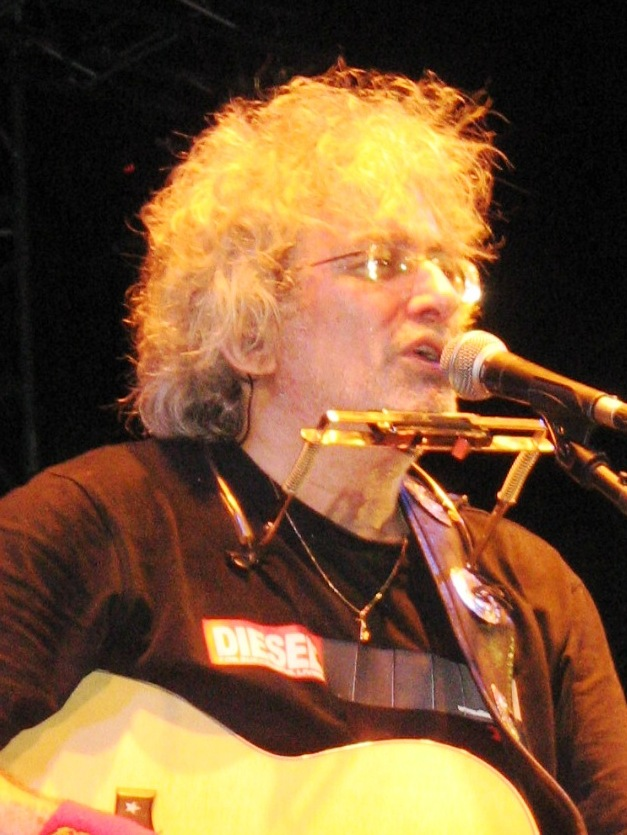
- Litani performing in 2008

Background information
- Born: Dan Litovski; 30 June 1943 (age 83); Haifa, Mandatory Palestine
- Genres: Folk; blues; rock; jazz
- Occupations: Singer-songwriter; composer; actor; voice artist
- Instruments: Vocals; guitar; harmonica
- Years active: 1968–present
- Website: http://www.danilitani.co.il

Dani Litani (Hebrew: דני ליטני [ˈdani liˈtani]; born 30 June 1943) is an Israeli singer-songwriter, composer, actor and voice actor.

== Biography ==
=== Early life ===
Born in Haifa, Litani learned to play the piano at age six and at age nine, he and his family moved to Jerusalem. He also spent some of his childhood in Ein HaShofet and Sha'ar HaAmakim where he improved on playing the guitar and the accordion. At age 17, Litani returned to Haifa and took an interest in blues and soul music, then he later founded a band with several friends.

After completing his military service, Litani founded another band which rose to fame since The Six-Day War. The band remained active throughout the 1960s.

=== Music career ===
In 1970, Litani ventured out into a solo career. Since then, he moved to Tel Aviv and abandoned his birth name. While in Tel Aviv, he met fellow musician Drora Havkin and made several collaborations with her. While performing, Litani often accompanies himself on the guitar and the harmonica and is heavily influenced by the work of Bob Dylan. He has performed cover versions of most of Dylan's music and has also performed covers of the works of Leah Goldberg.

During the mid-1970s, Litani sang in two satirical performances by Yehonatan Geffen. He has also made collaborations with other musicians which include Ronnie Peterson, Danny Robas, Udi Harpaz, Rachel Shapira and Shalom Hanoch.

=== Acting career ===
When Litani reached the peak of his fame, he also found fame acting. He has made appearances at the Haifa Theatre and performed in shows like Richard III. Litani appeared in the 1993 films Life According to Agfa and Dummy in a Circle. He has also appeared in numerous musicals on stage and television and performed for the soundtrack for the 1979 film Dizengoff 99.

As a voice actor, Litani provided voices of numerous Disney characters in Hebrew, starting with Baloo in The Jungle Book. He later voiced Little John in Robin Hood, Governor Ratcliffe in Pocahontas, Chef Louis in The Little Mermaid, The Walrus in Alice in Wonderland and a Crow in Dumbo.

=== Personal life ===
Litani is married and has four children. Since the early 2010s, Litani has had a hearing impairment but this has not affected his career.
