= Chelli Goldenberg =

Israeli actress, model, and writer

- חלי גולדנברג
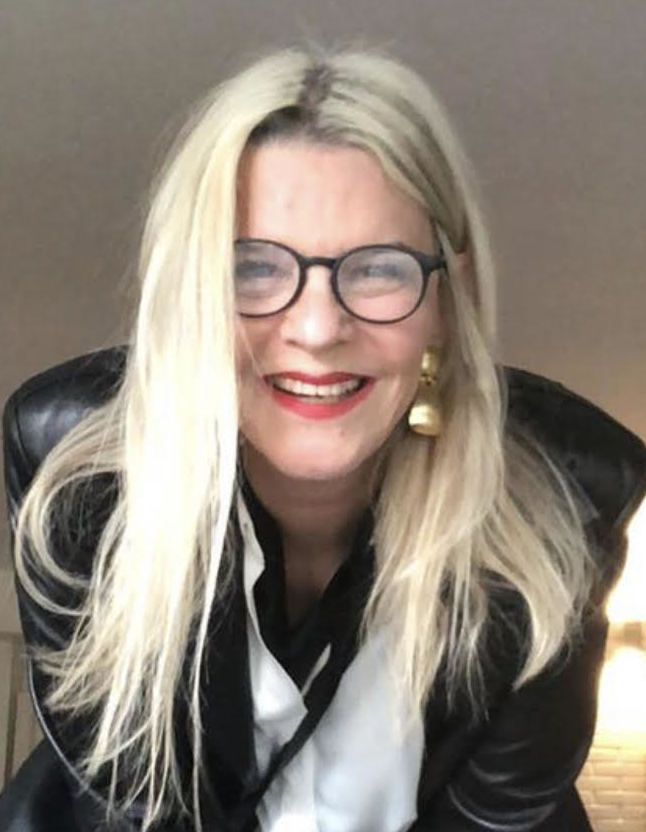
- Goldenberg, 2021
- Born: Rachel Goldenberg; 25 May 1954 (age 72); Tel Aviv, Israel
- Occupations: Actress, author
- Spouse: Avri Gilad (div.)
- Children: 1

Rachel "Chelli" Goldenberg (Hebrew: חלי גולדנברג; born May 25, 1954, in Tel Aviv) is an Israeli actress, model, blogger and writer.

== Biography ==
Goldenberg was born and raised in Tel Aviv, Israel, to family of Jewish background. At age 16, Goldenberg began a modeling career. Goldenberg became one of the leading Israeli models during the 1970s and 1980s. In 1973, Goldenberg was enlisted to the IDF and served in the Israeli Air Force.

In 1977, she appeared in Menahem Golan's film Operation Thunderbolt. Her big break as an actress occurred in 1978 when she starred in the Israeli cult film Ha-Lahaka. In 1979, she appeared in Dizengoff 99. Afterward, she studied in New York City at the Stella Adler Studio of Acting and the Lee Strasberg Theatre and Film Institute.

During the 1980s and 1990s, she took part in various films and advertisements, including a series of advertisements for the Israeli dairy pudding "Milky", for the Israeli food products brand Telma, and for the Israeli-based telecommunications company "Pelephone". During those years she appeared in The Delta Force (1986), Abba Ganuv 3, and the TV movie Hatulot Hara'am (1998).

During the 2000s, she participated in several TV series including Brown Girls, and Esti HaMekho'eret. Goldenberg also hosted a live variety style TV show called Our Life. Through the years, she released two children's books - her first book called "Smiles" was published in the mid-1990s by Ma'ariv. In 2004, she released her second book called "The Colored Dots of Compulsive Beetle", published by Yediot Aharonot. In 2006, she began writing a blog as well as a column in the printed edition of Yediot Ahronot.

In October 2026, during an interview with Israeli news Channel 13, Goldenberg, unaware that the channel was live on air, strongly criticized Israel's actions towards Palestine and Palestinians, characterizing Israelis as "occupiers" and citing such things as Israeli settlements in the West Bank or Jewish terrorism. Goldenberg later clarified these statements and apologized for the tone of her remarks.

== Personal life ==
Goldenberg was married to Israeli television host Avri Gilad; the couple has one daughter. Goldenberg resides in the neighborhood of Afeka, Tel Aviv.

== Children's books ==
- Smiles (Hebrew: חיוכים) (published by Ma'ariv)
- The Colored Dots of Piti the Beetle (Hebrew: הנקודות הצבעוניות של פיתי החיפושית) (Yediot Aharonot, 2004)

== Filmography ==
- Operation Thunderbolt (1977)
- Ha-Lahaka (1978)
- Dizengoff 99 (1979)
- The Cowards (1980)
- The Ambassador (1982)
- Girls (1985)
- "the delts force" (1986 )
- Abba Ganuv 3 (1991)
- Closing Doors Quietly (1994)
- Hatulot Hara'am (1997)
- One Small Step (2003)
- "Out in the dark" (2012 )
- "Sun flowers" (2014)
- "haritage" (2017 )
- 'the pool" (2023 )
- "Mama" (2025 )

Notable Television Appearances:

- Losing Alice (2020) as Tami
- Ad Hachatuna (2010) as Dede Sadot
- HaEi (2009) as Liz
- Hashoofim (2008) as Malca Lev-Ari
- Esti HaMechoeret (2004) as Ruti Caspi
- Bnot Brown (2002) as Miri Kraus
- Sipurim Kzarim Al Ahava as (1998)
