= Riki Gal =

Israeli singer (born 1950)

Riki Gal ריקי גל

Background information
- Born: July 7, 1950 (age 76)
- Origin: Israel
- Years active: 1971–present

Riki Gal (Hebrew: ריקי גל; born July 7, 1950, in Jerusalem) is an Israeli singer. Gal, who reached the height of her career in the 1980s, sings a mix of blues, folk and pop.

== Biography ==
Rivka Menashe (later Riki Gal) was born in 1950 to an Orthodox family in the poor neighborhood of Mea Shearim in Jerusalem. In her early years, Gal experienced a hard childhood: her parents divorced when she was two years old and she was taken to an institution in Kfar Saba along with her brother Menachem . Her mother was then able to raise the children on her own, but later could not afford the cost of growth, so she handed her children over to caregivers of the Finnish Lutheran Mission who raised them with strict discipline at the home Shalhevetya.

In 1968, at the age of seventeen, Gal was drafted into the navy, where she began her music career. After completing her military service in 1971, she married Yisrael Poliakov of the HaGashash HaHiver trio. The couple divorced in 1975. Following the divorce, Gal flew to New York, where she got married the second time. This marriage also ended in a divorce. Subsequently, Gal returned to Israel. From 1990 to 2002, she was married to the news reporter of Channel 1 Ori Cohen Aharonov. In 1991, they had a daughter named Leary.

== Music career ==
Gal began her music career in the entertainment troupe of the Israeli Navy. After her discharge from the IDF, she released her first single and an album called World of Jacques Brel. She has collaborated with Matti Caspi, Ehud Manor and Louis Lahav. She played Mama Morton in the Beit Lessin Theater production of Chicago and was a judge on Israel's version of A Star is Born, Kokhav Nolad. She was one of the stars of Les Miserables, a musical by Claude-Michel Schönberg and Alain Boublil based on the Victor Hugo novel. In 1989 she headlined the Israeli production of Evita, also starring Eli Gornstein and Viki Tavor.

Gal's album Ohevet otcha yoter (I love you more) was a co-production with Matti Caspi, who was responsible for most of the compositions, arrangements and instrumental accompaniment.

The title song of Gal's album Seeing the Years (2009) is "Imazman," a tribute to Gal's mother and also a play on words (ima = mom, zman = time, im hazman = over time). The song begins with words from the popular song "Que Sera, Sera" (Whatever Will Be, Will Be) and continues in Spanish.

== Dubbing Roles ==
- The Hunchback of Notre Dame - Esmeralda (Hebrew dub)

== See also ==
- Music of Israel
