= Gali Atari =

Israeli singer and actress (born 1953)

Gali Atari גלי עטרי
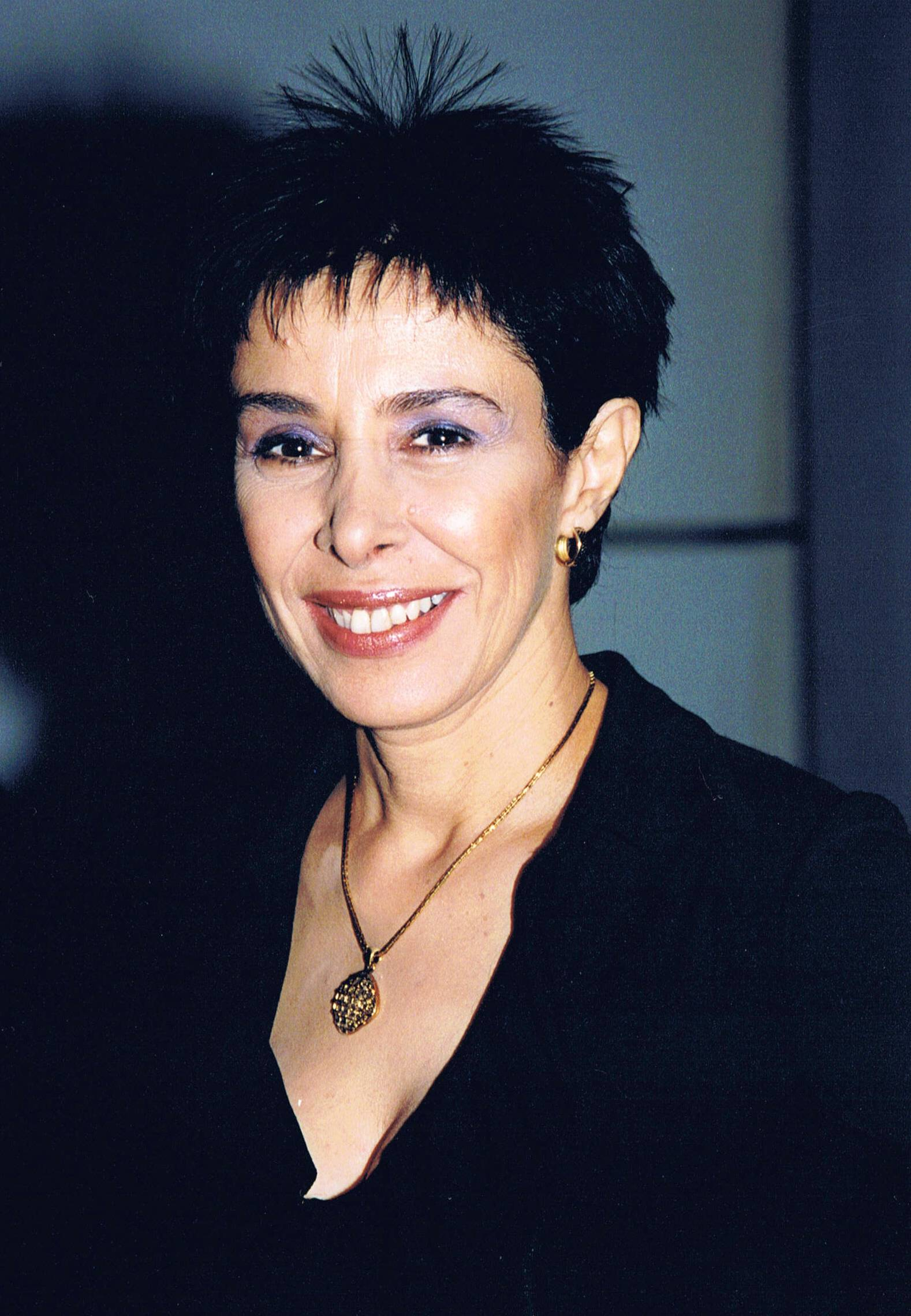

Background information
- Born: Avigail Atari; 29 December 1953 (age 72); Rehovot, Israel
- Genres: Pop; folk; rock
- Occupations: Singer; actress
- Years active: 1970–present
- Labels: Phonokol; NMC; CBS
- Formerly of: Milk and Honey

Gali Atari (Hebrew: גלי עטרי; born 29 December 1953) is an Israeli singer and actress. Atari won the Eurovision Song Contest 1979 which was held in Jerusalem, as part of the musical group Milk and Honey.

== Early life ==
Atari was born as Avigail Atari (Hebrew: אביגיל עטרי) in Rehovot, Israel, to Jewish parents who immigrated to Israel from Yemen. She is the sister of Yona Atari, a singer and actress, and Shosh Atari, a radio host and TV personality. Her father died when she was four years old, and, after his death, her family moved to live in Tel-Aviv.

== Career ==
=== 1970s ===
Atari was introduced to the Israeli musician David Kribushe when she was 15 years old. After an audition for him, he gave her a featured singing part in one of his songs “Half and Half”. In 1970, when she was 17 years old, she recorded two songs. The first song was in English, and it was called “Give Love Away”. The second song was a Hebrew song called “Im yesh lecha shemesh” (If You Have the Sun). The song became a big hit in Israel, and Atari represented Israel at the World Popular Song Festival in Japan. Atari participated in the contest again in 1976, this time with the song "The Same Old Game".

During the 1970s, Atari's career was progressing slowly. She recorded the song “sal eretz hachalom” (About the Land of Dream), which did not get much attention, and in 1975 she participated in the Hassidic Song Festival with the song “Leyerushalyim Yirech” (To your city of Jerusalem) and won second place. In 1978, Atari performed the song "Nesich hachlomot" (Dream Prince), along with musicians Zvi Bums and Udi Spielman, at the Festival Hazemer Ha'ivri - the Israeli qualification heat for the Eurovision Song Contest. She placed third at the festival and released a successful album by the same name as her third place song. Atari, undeterred by not winning the qualification heat for the Eurovision, entered again in 1979, this time as female vocalist with the Milk and Honey. They won, and their song, “Hallelujah”, represented Israel at the Eurovision Song Contest Song Contest staged in Jerusalem on March 31. The song was voted the winner and was a success on the European charts.

=== 1980s ===
After their Eurovision Song Contest win, Atari kept performing with Milk and Honey. They recorded a few more songs, many of which became great hits like “Galgal Anak” (Big Wheel), which won the title Song of the year for 1980, “Shir Lashirim” (A Song for the Songs), “Yachad” (Together), and “Ulay Od Kayitz” (Maybe One Summer).

In 1980, after a year of working together, Atari retired from Milk and Honey as a result of a lawsuit she filed against her manager, Shlomo Tasch. Atari claimed in court that she was not paid for about sixty performances on TV and in Europe and that once she left Milk and Honey a new vocalist was introduced and released an album with songs she recorded under the new vocalist's name. The trial dragged on for 14 years and concluded with a win for Atari, who was awarded 800,000 Shekels (about $227,000).

In 1981 Atari, working with the producer Yeroslav Yahakivovitch, recorded a rock album titled Kach Oti Habayta (Take Me Home). The album included hits including “Duet Preda” (Goodbye Duet) “Lo Yoda'at” (I Don't Know), and “Shelcha Ad Etmol” (Yours until Yesterday).

In 1986 Atari released her fourth album Emtza September (Middle of September). The album quickly became her most successful album up to that point, selling over 30,000 copies and prompting Atari to go on a successful concert tour as a soloist for the first time in her career. The album's most notable song "Ein Li Eretz Echeret" (I have no other land) became a patriotic anthem and was voted as the country's best song ever in 2023. The song was also translated and quoted by Nancy Pelosi in 2021 and 2022 following both the January 6 attacks and the overturning of Roe v Wade respectively.

Atari's success continued through the 80s as the singer released two more albums, Tza'ad Echad Lifnei Hanahar (One Step before the River), which sold over 80,000 copies in 1988 and Bereshit (Genesis), which sold 15,000 copies in 1989.

=== 1990s ===
In 1991 Atari released her first greatest hits album, titled Rak Etmol (Only Yesterday). The album was successful and sold over 20,000 copies.

In 1992 the album Bayom Shéachrei (The Day After) was released, and Atari was named the Singer of the Year by the Israeli radio station Reshet Gimel.

In 1994 she was requested by Israeli children's series Shirim K'tanim to work with Uzi Hitman. She was involved in the 7th video of the series which was revolving Passover and Shavuot and she joined in with all of the festival songs.

In 1996 Atai gave birth to her only child, Li, which inspired her to release an album titled Glida (Ice Cream). Even though the songs were written by the most popular songwriters in Israel at the time like Kobie Oz, Asthar Shamir and Shalom Chanoch, the album was not successful.

=== 2000s ===
In 2003 Atari released her album Chabeck Oti Léat (Hug Me Slowly). The song “Ma Shéat Ohevet" (What It Is that You Love) became successful and was adopted by many Israeli teenage girls as the celebration song for their Bat Mitzva celebrations.

In 2008, after her sister Shosh Atari's death, she released her album Bein Haésh Levein Hamayim (Between Fire and Water), which was dedicated to her sister.

In 2011, Atari released a few singles on the radio from an album in the works with the musician Amir Benayun. The album has yet to be released. In an interview on 2/17/2014 Atari said “The album is not happening right now, but I wouldn’t hurry to call the project canceled. I believe in this project but I need to find the correct time for this project.”

In 2012, she was approached to do a PR film for Hadassim youth village where she grew up; she refused. In February 2014, a new album was announced and a new single Ahava Lemaerchakim Arukim (Long-distance Love) was released. In 2019 when approached to revive the song that won her the Eurovision song contest at the 1979 competition, she refused to sing with her former teammates, Milk and Honey members Reuven Gvirtz, Shmulik Bilu and Yehuda Tamir. Instead, she sang the song as a solo artist, and almost immediately after joined by fellow past contestants Conchita Wurst, Måns Zelmerlow, Verka Serduchka, and Eleni Foureira.

== Solo discography ==
- 1978 – Nasich Hachalomot (Prince of dreams)
- 1981 – Kach Oti Habayta (Take me Home)
- 1984 – Mamria Baruach (Soaring in the Wind)
- 1986 – Emtza September (Middle of September)
- 1988 – Tza'ad Echad Lifnei Hanahar (One Step before the River)
- 1989 – Bereshit (Genesis)
- 1992 – Bayom Shéachrei (The Day After)
- 1992 – Simanim (Signs)
- 1998 – Glida (Ice Cream)
- 2003 – Chabeck Oti Léat (Hug Me Slowly)
- 2008 – Bein Haésh Levein Hamayim (Between Fire and Water)
- 2015 – Ahava Lemerchakim Arukim (Love for Long Distances)

Awards and achievements
Preceded by (Israel) Izhar Cohen & Alphabeta with "A-Ba-Ni-Bi"	Winner of the Eurovision Song Contest (as part of Milk and Honey); 1979	Succeeded by (Republic of Ireland) Johnny Logan with "What's Another Year?"
Preceded by Izhar Cohen & Alphabeta with "A-Ba-Ni-Bi"	Israel in the Eurovision Song Contest (as part of Milk and Honey); 1979	Succeeded by Hakol Over Habibi with "Halayla"
