= Israel in the Eurovision Song Contest 2019 =

- Eurovision Song Contest 2019
- Participating broadcaster: Israeli Public Broadcasting Corporation (IPBC/Kan)
- Country: Israel
- Selection process: Artist: HaKokhav HaBa L'Eirovizion; Song: Internal selection
- Selection date: Artist: 12 February 2019; Song: 10 March 2019

Competing entry
- Song: "Home"
- Artist: Kobi Marimi
- Songwriters: Ohad Shragai; Inbar Weitzman

Placement
- Final result: 23rd, 35 points

Participation chronology

Israel was represented at the Eurovision Song Contest 2019 with the song "Home", written by Ohad Shragai and Inbar Weitzman, and performed by Kobi Marimi. The Israeli participating broadcaster, the Israeli Public Broadcasting Corporation (IPBC/Kan), organised the reality singing competition HaKokhav HaBa L'Eirovizion ("The Next Star for Eurovision"), in collaboration with the commercial broadcaster Keshet and Tedy Productions, to select its performer for the contest, while the song "Home" was internally selected. In addition, Kan was also the host broadcaster and staged the event at Expo Tel Aviv in Tel Aviv, after winning the previous edition with the song "Toy" performed by Netta.

== Background ==
Prior to the 2019 contest, the Israel Broadcasting Authority (IBA) until 2017, and the Israeli Public Broadcasting Corporation (IPBC/Kan) in 2018, had participated in the Eurovision Song Contest representing Israel forty-one times since IBA's first entry in 1973. They had won the contest on four occasions: in 1978 with the song "A-Ba-Ni-Bi" performed by Izhar Cohen and the Alphabeta, in 1979 with the song "Hallelujah" performed by Milk and Honey, in 1998 with the song "Diva" performed by Dana International, and in 2018 with the song "Toy" performed by Netta Barzilai. Since the introduction of the semi-finals in 2004, they have failed to reach the final six times. In 2005, "Hasheket Shenish'ar" performed by Shiri Maimon gave them their tenth top five result, finishing fourth. Having failed to qualify for the final for four consecutive years (2011–14), they reached the final for the first time in five years, with "Golden Boy" by Nadav Guedj finishing ninth in 2015, and the country had participated in the final every year since.

The Israeli entry for the 2019 contest was selected through the reality singing competition HaKokhav HaBa L'Eirovizion ("The Next Star for Eurovision"), which was organised by Kan in collaboration with the commercial broadcaster Keshet and Tedy Productions. This was the fifth time that the Israeli entry was selected through a collaboration between these three companies.

== Before Eurovision ==
=== HaKokhav HaBa L'Eirovizion ===
The singer who would perform the Israeli entry for the Eurovision Song Contest 2019 was selected through the reality singing competition HaKokhav HaBa L'Eirovizion ("The Next Star for Eurovision"), the original version of the international format Rising Star produced by Tedy Productions and Keshet Media Group. HaKokhav HaBa had been used since 2015 to select the Israeli artist for Eurovision. The shows were hosted by Assi Azar and Rotem Sela and featured a judging panel composed of Asaf Amdursky, Keren Peles, Shiri Maimon (2005 Israeli Eurovision entrant), Harel Skaat (2010 Israeli Eurovision entrant) and Static & Ben-El Tavori.

The competition commenced on 24 November 2018 and concluded on 12 February 2019. All shows in the competition were broadcast on Keshet 12 as well as online via mako.co.il.

In addition, three showcase programs were broadcast on Kan to determine the song that would represent Israel in 2019. Kan also held an additional show to select one singer to go through to the final of HaKokhav HaBa L'Eurovizion.

==== Shows ====
===== Auditions =====
The auditions were broadcast between 24 November 2018 and 1 January 2019. 59 of the 105 contestants advanced to the next phase following achieving at least 70% of the votes while 9 contestants who did not get enough votes to qualify were saved by the hosts.

Among the contestants were Danielle Mazuz, who previously took part in the Eurovision Song Contest 2018 as a backing vocalist and dancer behind Netta, and Maya Bouskilla who was a candidate to represent Israel in the Eurovision Song Contest 2009, 2011 and 2012.

On 2 January 2019 one of the originally advanced contestants, Elkana Marziano announced that he would withdraw from the competition.

Audition 1 – 24 November 2018
Draw	Artist	Song	Judges' Vote					Presenters' Vote		Score	Result
Draw	Artist	Song	A. Amdursky	K. Peles	H. Skaat	S. Maimon	Static & B. El Tavori	R. Sela	A. Azar	Score	Result
1	Danielle Mazuz	"Happy"	Yes	Yes	Yes	Yes	Yes	—	—	90%	Advanced
2	Ofri Calfon	"Le'esof"	Yes	Yes	Yes	Yes	Yes	—	—	93%	Advanced
3	Yevgeny Morozov	"Shnei meshuga'im"	No	No	No	Yes	Yes	—	—	53%	Eliminated
4	Shachar Adawi	"Wikipedia"	Yes	Yes	Yes	Yes	Yes	—	—	89%	Advanced
5	Hila Leder	"Ex's & Oh's"	No	No	No	No	No	—	—	30%	Eliminated
6	Nadav Philips	"I Have Nothing"	Yes	Yes	No	Yes	Yes	—	—	82%	Advanced
7	Daniel Barzilai	"Osher ledaka"	Yes	Yes	Yes	Yes	Yes	—	—	88%	Advanced
8	Shalva Band	"Here Comes the Sun"	Yes	Yes	Yes	Yes	Yes	—	—	91%	Advanced

Audition 2 – 27 November 2018
Draw	Artist	Song	Judges' Vote					Presenters' Vote		Score	Result
Draw	Artist	Song	A. Amdursky	K. Peles	H. Skaat	S. Maimon	Static & B. El Tavori	R. Sela	A. Azar	Score	Result
1	Avraham de Carvalho	"Issues"	Yes	Yes	Yes	Yes	Yes	—	—	89%	Advanced
2	Lior Chen	"She'eriot me'atzmi"	Yes	Yes	Yes	Yes	Yes	—	—	89%	Advanced
3	Shir Azulai	"Aba"	No	No	Yes	Yes	Yes	—	—	67%	Eliminated
4	Tai	"River"	Yes	Yes	Yes	Yes	Yes	—	—	92%	Advanced
5	Alex Kay	"Rolling in the Deep"	No	Yes	Yes	No	No	—	—	43%	Eliminated
6	Shefita	"You Oughta Know"	No	Yes	Yes	Yes	Yes	Save	Save	58%	Saved
7	Maya Bouskilla	"Listen"	Yes	Yes	Yes	Yes	Yes	—	—	82%	Advanced

Audition 3 – 1 December 2018
Draw	Artist	Song	Judges' Vote					Presenters' Vote		Score	Result
Draw	Artist	Song	A. Amdursky	K. Peles	H. Skaat	S. Maimon	Static & B. El Tavori	R. Sela	A. Azar	Score	Result
1	Osher Biton	"Tel Aviv balaila"	Yes	Yes	— (Note: Harel Skaat was not present during the audition, therefore he did not vote. The remaining four judges could boost each contestant's score by 10% instead of the original 8.)	Yes	Yes	—	—	85%	Advanced
2	Liat Eliyahu	"She'tisaref ha'ahava"	Yes	Yes	Yes	Yes	Yes	—	—	88%	Advanced
3	Ruby Bedalov	"Don't Stop Me Now"	No	No	No	Yes	No	—	—	54%	Eliminated
4	Shachaf	"Born This Way"	Yes	Yes	Yes	No	Yes	—	—	76%	Advanced
5	Klara Sabag	"Mangina"	Yes	Yes	Yes	No	Yes	—	—	81%	Advanced
6	Judith Hasin	"River"	No	Yes	Yes	Yes	Yes	—	—	80%	Advanced
7	Elad Tavori	"Ve'at"	Yes	No	Did not vote	No	Did not vote	—	—	44%	Eliminated

Audition 4 – 3 December 2018
Draw	Artist	Song	Judges' Vote					Presenters' Vote		Score	Result
Draw	Artist	Song	A. Amdursky	K. Peles	H. Skaat	S. Maimon	Static & B. El Tavori	R. Sela	A. Azar	Score	Result
1	Gal Binyamin	"Hakol over"	No	Yes	No	Yes	Yes	—	—	70%	Advanced
2	Barry Brown	"You Raise Me Up"	No	Yes	Yes	Yes	Yes	—	—	78%	Advanced

Audition 5 – 4 December 2018
Draw	Artist	Song	Judges' Vote					Presenters' Vote		Score	Result
Draw	Artist	Song	A. Amdursky	K. Peles	H. Skaat	S. Maimon	Static & B. El Tavori	R. Sela	A. Azar	Score	Result
1	Naor Cohen	"Shemishehu yaatzor oti"	Yes	Yes	Yes	Yes	Yes	—	—	85%	Advanced
2	Naama Gali Cohen	"New Rules"	No	Yes	Yes	Yes	Yes	—	—	75%	Advanced
3	Shay Ben Aroya	"Ima im haiti"	No	Yes	Did not vote	Did not vote	No	—	—	46%	Eliminated
4	Romi Azar	"Creep"	No	Yes	Yes	No	No	Save	Save	55%	Saved
5	Limor Oved	"Ve'im preda"	Yes	Yes	—	Yes	Yes	—	—	91%	Advanced
6	Enosh Tzuberi	"Silsulim"	No	Yes	No	No	No	—	—	30%	Eliminated
7	Julia Grinitz	"Creep"	No	Yes	No	Yes	No	Save	Save	59%	Saved

Audition 6 – 8 December 2018
Draw	Artist	Song	Judges' Vote					Presenters' Vote		Score	Result
Draw	Artist	Song	A. Amdursky	K. Peles	H. Skaat	S. Maimon	Static & B. El Tavori	R. Sela	A. Azar	Score	Result
1	Asaf Maslati	"Ma ata rotze mimeni"	No	Yes	Yes	Yes	Yes	—	—	71%	Advanced
2	Eti Bitton	"Rak le'ima"	Yes	Yes	Yes	Yes	Yes	—	—	83%	Advanced
3	Asia and Alexandra	"Lost on You"	No	No	No	No	Yes	—	—	55%	Eliminated
4	Roy Sandler	"Yeladim ka'ale"	Yes	Yes	Yes	Yes	Yes	—	—	82%	Advanced
5	Aviv Matka	"Me and You"	No	No	No	No	No	—	—	35%	Eliminated
6	Sarah Moshaioff	"Ein li af echad"	Yes	Yes	Yes	Yes	Yes	—	—	90%	Advanced
7	Ohad Levi	"Tachzeri"	No	No	No	Yes	Yes	—	—	49%	Eliminated
8	Kobi Marimi	"Sweet Dreams"	Yes	Yes	Yes	Yes	Yes	—	—	92%	Advanced

Audition 7 – 11 December 2018
Draw	Artist	Song	Judges' Vote					Presenters' Vote		Score	Result
Draw	Artist	Song	A. Amdursky	K. Peles	H. Skaat	S. Maimon	Static & B. El Tavori	R. Sela	A. Azar	Score	Result
1	Ido Dankner	"One Dance / No"	No	Yes	No	Yes	Yes	—	—	70%	Advanced
2	Amit Sade	"Addicted to You"	No	Yes	Yes	Yes	Yes	—	—	81%	Advanced
3	Tomer Raz	"Gvulot hegayon"	Yes	Yes	Yes	Yes	No	—	—	71%	Advanced
4	Maor Kdoshim	"Im ha'ita ro'eh"	No	Yes	Yes	No	No	—	—	54%	Eliminated
5	Gilad Tenzer	"Ein yoter tov mize"	No	Yes	Yes	Yes	Yes	—	—	75%	Advanced
6	Meshi and Mor Portal	"Ach sheli"	No	No	Did not vote	Yes	No	—	—	39%	Eliminated
7	Elkana Marziano	"Holech li meyuash"	Yes	Yes	Yes	Yes	Yes	—	—	77%	Withdrew
8	Avivit Doron	"Mi yada she'kach yihye"	No	No	—	No	No	—	—	43%	Eliminated

Audition 8 – 13 December 2018
Draw	Artist	Song	Judges' Vote					Presenters' Vote		Score	Result
Draw	Artist	Song	A. Amdursky	K. Peles	H. Skaat	S. Maimon	Static & B. El Tavori	R. Sela	A. Azar	Score	Result
1	Niv Yanko	"Ha'ahava hazot shelanu"	Yes	Yes	Yes	Yes	Yes	—	—	91%	Advanced
2	Gavriel Cohen	"Ve'im preda"	No	Yes	—	No	No	—	—	29%	Eliminated
3	Eden Vered Mery	"Seven Nation Army"	Yes	Yes	No	Yes	Yes	—	—	78%	Advanced
4	Eliya Gabai	"Ahava ka'zo"	Yes	Yes	Yes	Yes	Yes	—	—	93%	Advanced

Audition 9 – 15 December 2018
Draw	Artist	Song	Judges' Vote					Presenters' Vote		Score	Result
Draw	Artist	Song	A. Amdursky	K. Peles	H. Skaat	S. Maimon	Static & B. El Tavori	R. Sela	A. Azar	Score	Result
1	Nave Madmon	"Stitches"	Yes	Yes	Yes	Yes	Yes	—	—	88%	Advanced
2	Yarden Yishai	"Albi ma'ak"	No	Yes	No	No	No	—	—	56%	Eliminated
3	Ayala Eligoola	"All I Ask"	No	Yes	Yes	Yes	Yes	—	—	83%	Advanced
4	Emanuel Shmuel	"Shelach beahava"	No	No	No	No	No	—	—	22%	Eliminated
5	Wanna Wanna	"Haverot shelach"	No	Yes	Yes	Yes	Yes	—	—	70%	Advanced
6	Tal Versano	"Malach sheli"	No	Yes	No	No	Yes	Save	Save	54%	Saved
7	Meni Gross	"Bamechonit"	Yes	Yes	No	No	Yes	—	—	66%	Eliminated
8	Ketreyah	"Mirrors"	Yes	Yes	Yes	Yes	Yes	—	—	95%	Advanced

Audition 10 – 19 December 2018
Draw	Artist	Song	Judges' Vote					Presenters' Vote		Score	Result
Draw	Artist	Song	A. Amdursky	K. Peles	H. Skaat	S. Maimon	Static & B. El Tavori	R. Sela	A. Azar	Score	Result
1	Alik Manshirov	"Ein po makom"	Yes	No	Yes	Yes	Yes	—	—	76%	Advanced
2	Frida Uziel	"Vidui"	No	Yes	No	Yes	Yes	Save	Save	60%	Saved

Audition 11 – 22 December 2018
Draw	Artist	Song	Judges' Vote					Presenters' Vote		Score	Result
Draw	Artist	Song	A. Amdursky	K. Peles	H. Skaat	S. Maimon	Static & B. El Tavori	R. Sela	A. Azar	Score	Result
1	Zohar Shechtman	"Shir shel yom chulin"	No	Yes	Yes	No	No	Save	Save	55%	Saved
2	Ilai Chapman	"Eich she'at yafa"	Yes	Yes	Yes	Yes	No	—	—	80%	Advanced
3	Osher Saba	"Ima im haiti"	No	No	No	Did not vote	No	—	—	34%	Eliminated
4	Noe Sassover	"Dangerous Woman"	Yes	Yes	—	Yes	Yes	—	—	86%	Advanced
5	Shon Bello	"Zman tov lishmoah"	No	— (Note: Keren Peles was not present during the audition, therefore she did not vote. The remaining four judges could boost each contestant's score by 10% instead of the original 8.)	No	No	Yes	—	—	40%	Eliminated
6	Yagel Yadai	"Ein li otcha"	No	Yes	Yes	Yes	Yes	—	—	77%	Advanced
7	Elsie Doll	"Friends"	No	No	No	Yes	No	—	—	36%	Eliminated
8	Nitay Twito	"Rise Up"	Yes	Yes	Yes	Yes	Yes	—	—	92%	Advanced

Audition 12 – 25 December 2018
Draw	Artist	Song	Judges' Vote					Presenters' Vote		Score	Result
Draw	Artist	Song	A. Amdursky	K. Peles	H. Skaat	S. Maimon	Static & B. El Tavori	R. Sela	A. Azar	Score	Result
1	Nethanel and Yarden Barzilai	"Tsevaim"	No	Yes	—	Yes	Yes	—	—	70%	Advanced
2	Maayan Brinza	"Leilotai"	No	No	Yes	Did not vote	No	—	—	46%	Eliminated
3	Shira Givony	"If I Were a Boy"	No	Yes	No	Yes	Yes	—	—	72%	Advanced
4	Or Ben Atar	"Achrei hakol mitgagea"	Yes	Yes	Yes	Yes	Yes	—	—	94%	Advanced
5	Meital Locke	"Haderech el hakfar"	No	—	Yes	Yes	No	—	—	66%	Eliminated
6	Avi Ashur	"Eten lach"	Yes	—	No	Yes	Yes	—	—	79%	Advanced
7	Sofia Makovkina	"Highway to Hell"	No	Yes	No	No	No	—	—	39%	Eliminated
8	Ihab Atila	"Eten lach shanim"	Yes	Yes	—	Yes	Yes	—	—	85%	Advanced

Audition 13 – 29 December 2018
Draw	Artist	Song	Judges' Vote					Presenters' Vote		Score	Result
Draw	Artist	Song	A. Amdursky	K. Peles	H. Skaat	S. Maimon	Static & B. El Tavori	R. Sela	A. Azar	Score	Result
1	Rotem Chen	"Osher ledaka"	Yes	Yes	No	Yes	Yes	—	—	80%	Advanced
2	Tchelet Perlmutter	"Soon We'll Be Found"	Yes	Yes	Yes	Yes	Yes	—	—	86%	Advanced
3	Dana Hertz	"Rise Up"	Yes	Yes	No	No	Yes	—	—	57%	Eliminated
4	Noa Klein	"Over the Rainbow"	Yes	—	Yes	Yes	Yes	—	—	88%	Advanced
5	Los Caparos	"Nachon lehayom"	No	Yes	Yes	Yes	Yes	—	—	70%	Advanced
6	Daniela Lamash	"Make You Feel My Love"	No	Yes	No	No	No	—	—	44%	Eliminated
7	Ofek Adanek	"She'at zaza"	Did not vote	No	Yes	Did not vote	Yes	Save	Save	50%	Saved

Audition 14 – 30 December 2018
Draw	Artist	Song	Judges' Vote					Presenters' Vote		Score	Result
Draw	Artist	Song	A. Amdursky	K. Peles	H. Skaat	S. Maimon	Static & B. El Tavori	R. Sela	A. Azar	Score	Result
1	Tali Rabinovich	"Dangerous Woman"	Yes	Yes	—	Yes	Yes	—	—	81%	Advanced
2	Itai Goren	"Hey at"	No	No	No	No	No	—	—	24%	Eliminated
3	Yuval Shauli	"Warrior"	No	No	Yes	Yes	No	Save	Save	59%	Saved
4	Immanuel Spiker	"Part of Your World"	No	No	Yes	No	Yes	—	—	59%	Eliminated
5	Dili	"Hasholef meBagdad"	No	No	No	No	No	—	—	25%	Eliminated
6	Bar Cohen	"Kshe'halachta"	Yes	Yes	Yes	Yes	No	—	—	81%	Advanced

Audition 15 – 31 December 2018
Draw	Artist	Song	Judges' Vote					Presenters' Vote		Score	Result
Draw	Artist	Song	A. Amdursky	K. Peles	H. Skaat	S. Maimon	Static & B. El Tavori	R. Sela	A. Azar	Score	Result
1	Avigal Reef Cohen	"Migdalor"	No	Yes	No	Yes	Yes	—	—	73%	Advanced
2	Ben Ganon	"Zer kisufim"	No	Yes	No	No	No	—	—	50%	Eliminated
3	Ariella Siman Tov	"Lo ohev oti yoter"	Yes	Yes	—	Yes	No	—	—	82%	Advanced
4	Roy Pinhasov	"Al taslicheni l'et zikna"	No	Yes	Yes	Yes	Yes	—	—	68%	Eliminated
5	Yakir Rada	"Alfei sipurim"	Did not vote	No	Did not vote	Did not vote	Did not vote	—	—	29%	Eliminated
6	Osher Davidian	"Nizacht iti hakol"	Yes	Yes	Yes	Yes	Yes	—	—	88%	Advanced

Audition 16 – 1 January 2019
Draw	Artist	Song	Judges' Vote					Presenters' Vote		Score	Result
Draw	Artist	Song	A. Amdursky	K. Peles	H. Skaat	S. Maimon	Static & B. El Tavori	R. Sela	A. Azar	Score	Result
1	Marie Ben Haim	"Yesh bi od koach"	Yes	No	No	No	Yes	Save	Save	67%	Saved
2	Mazal Kav	"Latch"	Yes	Yes	No	Yes	Yes	—	—	73%	Advanced
3	Michal Shavo	"Your Love (Keeps Me Alive)"	No	No	No	No	No	—	—	18%	Eliminated
4	Elisete Ritter	"Mas que Nada"	No	No	No	No	No	—	—	22%	Eliminated
5	Gadi Sulimanov	"Nagia rachok"	No	Yes	—	Did not vote	Yes	—	—	63%	Eliminated
6	Natalie Wamba Berry	"Crazy"	Yes	—	Yes	Yes	Yes	—	—	83%	Advanced
7	Amir and Shahar Exol	"Katonti"	Yes	—	No	Yes	No	—	—	66%	Eliminated
8	Ana Eliya Ben David	"Nigun haneshamot"	No	Yes	—	Yes	No	—	—	45%	Eliminated
9	Zohar Garala	"Lomedet lalechet"	Yes	No	No	Yes	Yes	—	—	78%	Advanced

===== Shortlisting rounds =====
The shortlisting rounds were broadcast between 7 and 10 January 2019. 20 of the 67 contestants advanced to the next phase of the competition. The results were decided with the same method as in the auditions with the only difference that votes in this round were cast solely by the judges, therefore each judge could add 20% to the contestant's final score. Each shortlisting round consisted of two rounds: in the first round all contestants performed behind the wall. The contestants with a score of at least 60% advanced to the second round where the judges decided which contestants advance to the next phase of the competition.

Shortlisting Round 1 – 7 January 2019
Draw	Artist	Song	Judges' Vote					Score	Result
Draw	Artist	Song	A. Amdursky	K. Peles	H. Skaat	S. Maimon	Static & B. El Tavori	Score	Result
1	Lior Chen	"Sipur machur"	Yes	Yes	Did not vote	Yes	Yes	80%	Advanced
2	Maya Bouskilla	"Wrecking Ball"	Yes	Yes	Yes	Yes	Yes	100%	Advanced
3	Shefita	"Karma Police"	No	Yes	Yes	Yes	Yes	80%	Advanced
4	Tal Versano	"Osher ledaka"	No	No	No	No	Yes	20%	Eliminated
5	Tai	"High Hopes"	No	Yes	Yes	Yes	Yes	80%	Advanced
6	Nadav Philips	"Paparazzi"	Yes	Yes	No	No	Yes	60%	Eliminated
7	Ariella Siman Tov	"Chelek mimcha"	No	Yes	No	No	No	20%	Eliminated
8	Ayala Eligoola	"Shallow"	No	Yes	Yes	Yes	Yes	80%	Eliminated
9	Osher Biton	"Yam shel dmaot"	Yes	Yes	No	Yes	Yes	80%	Advanced

Shortlisting Round 2 – 8 January 2019
Draw	Artist	Song	Judges' Vote					Score	Result
Draw	Artist	Song	A. Amdursky	K. Peles	H. Skaat	S. Maimon	Static & B. El Tavori	Score	Result
1	Klara Sabag	"Who You Are"	No	Yes	Yes	Yes	Yes	80%	Advanced
2	Daniel Barzilai	"I'm Not the Only One"	Yes	Yes	Yes	Yes	Yes	100%	Advanced
3	Frida Uziel	"Wicked Game"	No	Yes	No	Did not vote	No	20%	Eliminated
4	Naor Cohen	"Etz yarok miplastik"	No	Yes	Yes	Yes	Yes	80%	Advanced
5	Naama Gali Cohen	"Crazy in Love"	No	Yes	Yes	Yes	No	60%	Advanced
6	Ido Dankner	"...Baby One More Time"	No	Yes	No	Yes	Yes	60%	Eliminated
7	Romi Azar	"Help!"	No	No	No	Yes	No	20%	Eliminated
8	Shalva Band	"Eich efshar shelo"	Yes	Yes	Yes	Yes	Yes	100%	Advanced

Shortlisting Round 3 – 9 January 2019
Draw	Artist	Song	Judges' Vote					Score	Result
Draw	Artist	Song	A. Amdursky	K. Peles	H. Skaat	S. Maimon	Static & B. El Tavori	Score	Result
1	Gal Binyamin	"Absurd"	No	Yes	No	Yes	Yes	60%	Eliminated
2	Shachaf	"Fallin'"	No	Yes	Yes	Yes	Yes	80%	Advanced
3	Nethanel and Yarden Barzilai	"HaSheket SheNish'ar"	No	No	No	Did not vote	Yes	20%	Eliminated
4	Liat Eliyahu	"Ve'im tavo'i elay / Haim sheli"	No	Yes	Yes	Yes	Yes	80%	Advanced
5	Kobi Marimi	"Jar of Hearts"	No	Yes	Yes	Yes	Yes	80%	Advanced
6	Julia Grinitz	"Freedom"	Yes	Yes	Yes	Yes	No	80%	Eliminated
7	Ofri Calfon	"Kol hamilim"	Yes	Yes	Yes	Yes	Yes	100%	Advanced
8	Asaf Maslati	"Ahava"	No	No	Yes	No	Yes	40%	Eliminated
9	Wanna Wanna	"Only Girl (In the World)"	Yes	Yes	Yes	Yes	Yes	100%	Advanced

Shortlisting Round 4 – 10 January 2019
Draw	Artist	Song	Judges' Vote					Score	Result
Draw	Artist	Song	A. Amdursky	K. Peles	H. Skaat	S. Maimon	Static & B. El Tavori	Score	Result
1	Danielle Mazuz	"Ata chayav lamut alay"	No	Yes	Yes	Yes	Yes	80%	Advanced
2	Avraham de Carvalho	"Who You Are"	Yes	No	Yes	Yes	Yes	80%	Advanced
3	Amit Sade	"This Love"	Did not vote	No	No	Yes	No	20%	Eliminated
4	Tchelet Perlmutter	"Gara mul hamayim"	Yes	Yes	Yes	No	No	60%	Eliminated
5	Ketreyah	"Price Tag"	No	Yes	Yes	No	Yes	60%	Advanced
6	Judith Hasin	"Lif'amim"	No	Yes	No	No	No	20%	Eliminated
7	Nitay Twito	"All of Me"	Yes	Yes	Yes	Yes	Yes	100%	Advanced
8	Ofek Adanek	"Stigma shel hagil"	No	No	Yes	No	Yes	40%	Eliminated
9	Nave Madmon	"Pillowtalk"	Yes	Yes	Yes	Yes	Yes	100%	Advanced

Eliminated contestants whose performances were not included in the shows
Alik Manshirov	Limor Oved	Roy Sandler
Avi Ashur	Los Caparos	Sarah Moshaioff
Avigal Reef Cohen	Marie Ben Haim	Shachar Adawi
Bar Cohen	Mazal Kav	Shira Givony
Barry Brown	Natalie Wamba Berry	Tali Rabinovich
Eden Vered Mery	Niv Yanko	Tomer Raz
Eliya Gabai	Noa Klein	Yagel Yadai
Eti Bitton	Noe Sassover	Yuval Shauli
Gilad Tenzer	Or Ben Atar	Zohar Garala
Ihab Atila	Osher Davidian	Zohar Shechtman
Ilai Chapman	Rotem Chen	

===== Top 20 round =====
The Top 20 round was broadcast between 13 and 15 January 2019. The remaining 20 contestants were paired in 10 duels. From each duel, the contestant with the higher score advanced to the next phase of the competition. At the end of the duels, two contestants who did not win their duels were saved by the judges and the remaining contestants were eliminated.

Static and Ben-El Tavori did not attend the shows, therefore they did not vote. They were replaced by singer Itay Levi in the judging panel.

Top 20 Round – Show 1 – 13 January 2019
Duel	Draw	Artist	Song	Judges' Vote					Score	Result
Duel	Draw	Artist	Song	A. Amdursky	K. Peles	I. Levi	H. Skaat	S. Maimon	Score	Result
I	1	Wanna Wanna	"I Trusted U"	No	Yes	Yes	Yes	Yes	68%	Eliminated
I	2	Maya Bouskilla	"If I Were a Boy"	No	Yes	Yes	Yes	Yes	81%	Advanced
II	3	Shachaf	"Déjà vu"	No	Yes	Yes	Yes	Yes	60%	Eliminated
II	4	Klara Sabag	"Rolling in the Deep"	No	Yes	Yes	Yes	No	76%	Advanced
III	5	Lior Chen	"Russian Roulette"	No	Yes	Yes	No	Yes	64%	Eliminated
III	6	Osher Biton	"Estader levad"	Yes	Yes	Yes	Yes	Yes	87%	Advanced

Top 20 Round – Show 2 – 14 January 2019
Duel	Draw	Artist	Song	Judges' Vote					Score	Result
Duel	Draw	Artist	Song	A. Amdursky	K. Peles	I. Levi	H. Skaat	S. Maimon	Score	Result
I	1	Naama Gali Cohen	"Rockabye"	Yes	Yes	No	Yes	No	64%	Eliminated
I	2	Daniel Barzilai	"Ish shel laila"	No	Yes	Yes	Yes	Yes	80%	Advanced
II	3	Shefita	"Can't Stop the Feeling!"	No	Yes	No	Yes	No	41%	Saved
II	4	Tai	"Radioactive"	Yes	Yes	Yes	Yes	Yes	89%	Advanced
III	5	Kobi Marimi	"Mad World"	No	Yes	Yes	Yes	No	57%	Advanced
III	6	Liat Eliyahu	"Stone Cold"	Yes	No	No	No	No	51%	Eliminated

Top 20 Round – Show 3 – 15 January 2019
Duel	Draw	Artist	Song	Judges' Vote					Score	Result
Duel	Draw	Artist	Song	A. Amdursky	K. Peles	I. Levi	H. Skaat	S. Maimon	Score	Result
I	1	Avraham de Carvalho	"Viva la Vida"	Yes	No	No	Yes	Yes	67%	Saved
I	2	Ketreyah	"Just the Way You Are"	No	Yes	Yes	Yes	Yes	83%	Advanced
II	3	Nitay Twito	"Sorry"	No	No	Yes	Yes	Yes	68%	Eliminated
II	4	Ofri Calfon	"Tocho ratzuf ahava"	Yes	Yes	Yes	Yes	Yes	90%	Advanced
III	5	Nave Madmon	"Never Forget You"	No	No	Yes	No	Yes	53%	Eliminated
III	6	Danielle Mazuz	"Earth Song"	No	Yes	No	No	No	54%	Advanced
IV	7	Shalva Band	"The Sound of Silence"	Yes	Yes	Yes	Yes	Yes	95%	Advanced
IV	8	Naor Cohen	"Shtaim balaila"	No	No	Yes	Yes	Yes	66%	Eliminated

===== Elimination shows =====
====== Heat 1 ======
The first heat was broadcast on 19 January 2019. The remaining twelve contestants were paired in five thematical duels: the contestants of the first duel had to show their style, the second duel consisted of songs of divas, in the third duel four contestants were paired in two duets, the contestants in the fourth duel had to sing about a personal story and the fifth duel consisted of former Eurovision Song Contest entries. From each duel, the contestant with the higher score advanced to the next phase of the competition. At the end of the duels, five contestants who did not win their duels were saved by the judges and the remaining one contestant was eliminated.

Heat 1 – 19 January 2019
Duel	Draw	Artist	Song	Judges' Vote					Score	Result
Duel	Draw	Artist	Song	A. Amdursky	K. Peles	H. Skaat	S. Maimon	Static & B. El Tavori	Score	Result
I	1	Ketreyah	"Wings"	Yes	Yes	Yes	Yes	Yes	85%	Advanced
I	2	Danielle Mazuz	"No Diggity"	No	Yes	No	Yes	Yes	69%	Saved
II	3	Shefita	"Bootylicious"	Yes	Yes	Yes	Yes	Yes	83%	Saved
II	4	Avraham de Carvalho	"When We Were Young"	Yes	Yes	Yes	Yes	Yes	88%	Advanced
III	5	Klara Sabag and Osher Biton	"Tafasta li makom"	Yes	No	Yes	Yes	No	71%	Eliminated; Saved (Note: At the end of the show, Klara Sabag was eliminated while Osher Biton was saved by the judges.)
III	6	Ofri Calfon and Shalva Band	"Chalomot shel acherim"	Yes	Yes	Yes	Yes	Yes	94%	Advanced
IV	7	Tai	"Breathe Me"	No	Yes	No	Yes	Yes	72%	Saved
IV	8	Daniel Barzilai	"Hello"	No	Yes	Yes	Yes	Yes	79%	Advanced
V	9	Kobi Marimi	"Fuego"	Yes	Yes	No	Yes	Yes	80%	Saved
V	10	Maya Bouskilla	"Rise Like a Phoenix"	Yes	Yes	Yes	Yes	Yes	85%	Advanced

====== Heat 2 ======
The second heat was broadcast on 20 and 21 January 2019. The remaining eleven contestants were paired in duels. From each duel, the contestant with the higher score advanced to the next phase of the competition while the contestant with the lowest score at that moment had to choose its opponent at the end of each duel. At the end of the duels, the contestant with the lowest score was eliminated.

Heat 2 – First Part – 20 January 2019
Draw	Artist	Song	Judges' Vote					Score	Result
Draw	Artist	Song	A. Amdursky	K. Peles	H. Skaat	S. Maimon	Static & B. El Tavori	Score	Result
1	Daniel Barzilai	"Grenade"	Yes	Yes	Yes	Yes	No	73%	Advanced
2	Maya Bouskilla	"Warrior"	Yes	Yes	Yes	Yes	No	63%	Advanced
3	Shefita	"Broken"	Yes	Yes	Yes	Yes	No	69%	Advanced
4	Danielle Mazuz	"Toxic"	No	Yes	No	No	Yes	59%	Advanced
5	Avraham de Carvalho	"Back to Black"	Yes	Yes	Yes	Yes	Yes	88%	Advanced
6	Osher Biton	"Harbe mimech nishar"	No	No	Yes	Yes	No	47%	Eliminated
7	Shalva Band	"Hallelujah"	Yes	Yes	Did not vote	Yes	No	76%	Advanced
8	Ofri Calfon	"Ahava ka'zo"	Yes	Yes	No	No	No	55%	Advanced

Heat 2 – Second Part – 21 January 2019
Draw	Artist	Song	Judges' Vote					Score	Result
Draw	Artist	Song	A. Amdursky	K. Peles	H. Skaat	S. Maimon	Static & B. El Tavori	Score	Result
9	Kobi Marimi	"Circle of Life"	No	Yes	Did not vote	Yes	Yes	70%	Advanced
10	Tai	"Love on the Brain"	No	No	Yes	Yes	Yes	64%	Advanced
11	Ketreyah	"Kshalev boche"	Yes	Yes	Yes	Yes	Yes	86%	Advanced

Duels of the first part
Duel	Artist	Score	Artist	Score
I	Daniel Barzilai	73%	Maya Bouskilla	63%
II	Maya Bouskilla	63%	Shefita	69%
III	Maya Bouskilla	63%	Danielle Mazuz	59%
IV	Danielle Mazuz	59%	Avraham de Carvalho	88%
V	Danielle Mazuz	59%	Osher Biton	47%
VI	Osher Biton	47%	Shalva Band	76%
VII	Osher Biton	47%	Ofri Calfon	55%

Duels of the second part
Duel	Artist	Score	Artist	Score
VIII	Osher Biton	47%	Kobi Marimi	70%
IX	Osher Biton	47%	Tai	64%
X	Osher Biton	47%	Ketreyah	86%

====== Heat 3 ======
The third heat was broadcast on 26 January 2019. The remaining ten contestants were paired in four thematical duels: in the first duel four contestants were paired in two duets, the contestants in the second duel had to sing about a personal story, the third duel consisted of votes of the audience only and the contestants in the fourth duel had to sing in duet with one of the judges, Harel Skaat. From each duel, the contestant with the higher score advanced to the next phase of the competition. At the end of the duels, four contestants who did not win their duels were saved by the judges and the remaining one contestant was eliminated.

In the first and fourth duel, Harel Skaat was replaced by Gali Atari who, as part of Milk and Honey, won the Eurovision Song Contest 1979.

Heat 3 – 26 January 2019
Duel	Draw	Artist	Song	Judges' Vote					Score	Result
Duel	Draw	Artist	Song	A. Amdursky	K. Peles	H. Skaat	S. Maimon	Static & B. El Tavori	Score	Result
I	1	Maya Bouskilla and Ketreyah	"Bang Bang"	Yes	Yes	Yes	Yes	Yes	94%	Advanced
I	2	Ofri Calfon and Daniel Barzilai	"Lifnei she'yigamer"	Yes	Yes	Yes	Yes	Yes	92%	Saved
II	3	Danielle Mazuz	"Make You Feel My Love"	No	Yes	No	Did not vote	No	58%	Eliminated
II	4	Kobi Marimi	"This Is Me"	No	Yes	Yes	Yes	Yes	81%	Advanced
III	5	Shefita	"Material Girl"	—	—	—	—	—	37%	Saved
III	6	Tai	"Womanizer"	—	—	—	—	—	76%	Advanced
IV	7	Shalva Band and Harel Skaat	"Bechayai"	No	Yes	Yes	Yes	Yes	83%	Advanced
IV	8	Avraham de Carvalho and Harel Skaat	"Shallow"	Yes	Yes	Yes	Yes	No	75%	Saved

====== Heat 4 ======
The fourth heat was broadcast on 27 and 28 January 2019. The remaining nine contestants performed behind the wall except for the first contestant. At the end of the performances, the contestant with the lowest score was eliminated.

Heat 4 – First Part – 27 January 2019
Draw	Artist	Song	Judges' Vote					Score	Result
Draw	Artist	Song	A. Amdursky	K. Peles	H. Skaat	S. Maimon	Static & B. El Tavori	Score	Result
1	Kobi Marimi	"Diamonds"	Yes	Yes	Yes	No	No	48%	Eliminated
2	Ketreyah	"Stay"	Yes	Yes	Yes	Yes	Yes	95%	Advanced
3	Ofri Calfon	"Runnin' (Lose It All)"	Yes	Yes	No	No	Yes	71%	Advanced
4	Shefita	"Black Hole Sun"	Yes	Yes	Yes	Yes	No	54%	Advanced
5	Tai	"Never Tear Us Apart"	No	Yes	No	Yes	Yes	69%	Advanced
6	Daniel Barzilai	"Eifo hayit"	No	No	Yes	Yes	No	59%	Advanced
7	Maya Bouskilla	"I Will Always Love You"	Yes	Yes	Yes	No	Yes	77%	Advanced

Heat 4 – Second Part – 28 January 2019
Draw	Artist	Song	Judges' Vote					Score	Result
Draw	Artist	Song	A. Amdursky	K. Peles	H. Skaat	S. Maimon	Static & B. El Tavori	Score	Result
8	Shalva Band	"Ani ro'a bach mashehu tov"	Yes	Yes	Yes	Yes	Yes	91%	Advanced
9	Avraham de Carvalho	"Let It Go"	No	No	Yes	Did not vote	Yes	56%	Advanced

====== Semi-final 1 ======
The first semi-final was broadcast on 2 February 2019 and consisted of two rounds: four of the remaining eight contestants were paired in two duels in the first round. From each duel, the contestant with the higher score advanced to the second round. At the end of the first round, one of the remaining two contestants was saved by the judges and the other contestant was eliminated. The winners of the two duels were paired in a third duel in the second round. At the end of the duel, each judge allocated twelve points to their favourite and ten points to their runner-up. In addition to the votes of the judges, 40 points in proportion to the votes of the audience were also allocated to the two contestants. In the end, the contestant with the higher number of points advanced directly to the final and the other contestant advanced to the next phase of the competition.

In addition to the individual performances, the four contestants performed I Gotta Feeling prior to the first round.

On 5 February 2019 Shalva Band announced that they would withdraw from the competition.

Semi-final 1 – First Round – 2 February 2019
Duel	Draw	Artist	Song	Judges' Vote					Score	Result
Duel	Draw	Artist	Song	A. Amdursky	K. Peles	H. Skaat	S. Maimon	Static & B. El Tavori	Score	Result
I	1	Ketreyah	"There's Nothing Holdin' Me Back"	Yes	Yes	Yes	Yes	Yes	88%	Second Round
I	2	Tai	"Genius"	No	No	No	No	No	42%	Eliminated
II	3	Daniel Barzilai	"Kshe'acher"	No	Yes	No	No	No	30%	Saved
II	4	Shalva Band	"True Colors"	Yes	Yes	No	Yes	Yes	84%	Second Round

Semi-final 1 – Second Round
Draw	Artist	Song	Jury							Audience	Total	Result
Draw	Artist	Song	A. Amdursky	K. Peles	H. Skaat	S. Maimon	Static	B. El Tavori	Total	Audience	Total	Result
5	Shalva Band	"Pizmon LaYakinton"	10	10	10	12	12	12	66	21	87	Withdrew
6	Ketreyah	"HaSheket SheNish'ar"	12	12	12	10	10	10	66	19	85	Advanced

====== Semi-final 2 ======
The second semi-final was broadcast on 3 February 2019 and consisted of two rounds: four of the remaining eight contestants were paired in two duels in the first round. From each duel, the contestant with the higher score advanced to the second round. At the end of the first round, one of the remaining two contestants was saved by the judges and the other contestant was eliminated. The winners of the two duels were paired in a third duel in the second round. At the end of the duel, each judge allocated twelve points to their favourite and ten points to their runner-up. In addition to the votes of the judges, 40 points in proportion to the votes of the audience were also allocated to the two contestants. In the end, the contestant with the higher number of points advanced directly to the final and the other contestant advanced to the next phase of the competition.

In addition to the individual performances, the four contestants performed Can't Stop the Feeling prior to the first round.

Semi-final 2 – First Round – 3 February 2019
Duel	Draw	Artist	Song	Judges' Vote					Score	Result
Duel	Draw	Artist	Song	A. Amdursky	K. Peles	H. Skaat	S. Maimon	Static & B. El Tavori	Score	Result
I	1	Maya Bouskilla	"Love On Top / We Will Rock You"	Yes	Yes	Yes	Yes	Yes	85%	Second Round
I	2	Shefita	"Imagine"	Yes	Yes	Yes	Yes	Yes	72%	Saved
II	3	Avraham de Carvalho	"Writing's on the Wall"	Yes	Yes	Yes	Yes	Yes	82%	Second Round
II	4	Ofri Calfon	"Ya mama"	Yes	No	Yes	No	No	55%	Eliminated

Semi-final 2 – Second Round
Draw	Artist	Song	Jury							Audience	Total	Result
Draw	Artist	Song	A. Amdursky	K. Peles	H. Skaat	S. Maimon	Static	B. El Tavori	Total	Audience	Total	Result
5	Avraham de Carvalho	"Halo"	12	10	10	10	10	10	62	19	81	Advanced
6	Maya Bouskilla	"A Million Voices"	10	12	12	12	12	12	70	21	91	Finalist

====== Semi-final 3 ======
The third semi-final was broadcast on 4 February 2019. The remaining four contestants who did not advance automatically to the final performed behind the wall except for the first contestant. At the end of the performances, the contestant with the highest score advanced to the final.

Semi-final 3 – 4 February 2019
Draw	Artist	Song	Judges' Vote					Score	Result
Draw	Artist	Song	A. Amdursky	K. Peles	H. Skaat	S. Maimon	Static & B. El Tavori	Score	Result
1	Daniel Barzilai	"Use Somebody"	No	Yes	No	No	No	50%	Advanced
2	Ketreyah	"Rise Up"	Yes	Yes	Yes	Yes	Yes	91%	Finalist
3	Shefita	"Lioness"	Yes	Yes	Yes	Yes	No	65%	Advanced
4	Avraham de Carvalho	"Perfect"	Yes	Yes	Yes	Yes	Yes	89%	Advanced

====== Wildcard round ======
The wildcard round was broadcast on 7 February 2019. Two previously eliminated contestants were paired in a duel. At the end of the duel, each judge allocated twelve points to their favourite and ten points to their runner-up. In addition to the votes of the judges, 40 points in proportion to the votes of the audience were also allocated to the two contestants. In the end, the contestant with the higher number of points returned to the competition and the other contestant was eliminated.

Wildcard Round – 7 February
Draw	Artist	Song	Jury							Audience	Total	Result
Draw	Artist	Song	A. Amdursky	K. Peles	H. Skaat	S. Maimon	Static	B. El Tavori	Total	Audience	Total	Result
1	Osher Biton	"Pri ganech"	10	10	12	10	12	12	66	19	85	Eliminated
2	Kobi Marimi	"Knockin' on Heaven's Door"	12	12	10	12	10	10	66	21	87	Wildcard

====== Semi-final 4 ======
The fourth semi-final was broadcast on 9 February 2019 and consisted of two rounds: the remaining four contestants were paired in two duels in the first round. From each duel, the contestant with the higher score advanced to the second round. At the end of the first round, one of the remaining two contestants was saved by the judges and the other contestant was eliminated. The remaining three contestants were paired in a third duel in the second round. At the end of the duel, each judge allocated twelve points to their favourite, ten points to their runner-up and eight points to their least favourite. In addition to the votes of the judges, 60 points in proportion to the votes of the audience were also allocated to the three contestants. In the end, the two contestants with the highest number of points advanced to the final and the third-placed contestant was eliminated.

Semi-final 4 – First Round – 9 February 2019
Duel	Draw	Artist	Song	Judges' Vote					Score	Result
Duel	Draw	Artist	Song	A. Amdursky	K. Peles	H. Skaat	S. Maimon	Static & B. El Tavori	Score	Result
I	1	Shefita	"Crazy"	Yes	Yes	Yes	Yes	Yes	74%	Saved
I	2	Avraham de Carvalho	"Believe"	Yes	Yes	Yes	Yes	Yes	89%	Second Round
II	3	Daniel Barzilai	"Im ha'ita ro'eh"	No	Yes	Yes	No	Yes	58%	Eliminated
II	4	Kobi Marimi	"Russian Roulette"	No	Yes	Yes	Yes	Yes	78%	Second Round

Semi-final 4 – Second Round
Draw	Artist	Song	Jury							Audience	Total	Result
Draw	Artist	Song	A. Amdursky	K. Peles	H. Skaat	S. Maimon	Static	B. El Tavori	Total	Audience	Total	Result
5	Avraham de Carvalho	"Stay with Me"	10	8	8	8	8	10	52	18	70	Eliminated
6	Shefita	"Feeling Good"	12	10	12	10	10	8	62	20	82	Finalist
7	Kobi Marimi	"Hallelujah"	8	12	10	12	12	12	66	22	88	Finalist

====== Final ======
The final was held on 12 February 2019 and consisted of two rounds: the remaining four contestants were paired in two duels in the first round. From each duel, the contestant with the higher score advanced to the second round. In the first round, each judge could boost the contestants' score by three percent instead of the original eight. At the end of the first round, one of the remaining two contestants was saved by the viewers and the other contestant was eliminated.

The remaining three contestants were paired in a third duel in the second round. At the end of the duel, each judge allocated twelve points to their favourite, ten points to their runner-up and eight points to their least favourite. In addition to the votes of the judges, 270 points in proportion to the votes of the audience were also allocated to the three contestants. In the end, the contestant with the highest number of points won the competition.

Additionally, three thematical jury groups were asked to vote by the same method as the in-studio judges in the second round. The members of the three jury groups were:

- Group 1: Judges of Kokhav Nolad – Gal Uchovsky, Margalit Tzan'ani, Tzedi Tzarfati
- Group 2: Presenters of the Israeli Public Broadcasting Corporation – Avia Malka, Dafna Lustig, Lucy Ayoub
- Group 3: Composers of former Israeli Eurovision Song Contest entries – Kobi Oshrat, Stav Beger, Yoav Ginai

In addition to the individual performances, the four contestants performed a medley of Toy and High Hopes prior to the first round and the winner of the Eurovision Song Contest 2018, Netta performed Bassa Sababa as an interval act.

Final – First Round – 12 February 2019
Duel	Draw	Artist	Song	Judges' Vote					Score	Result
Duel	Draw	Artist	Song	A. Amdursky	K. Peles	H. Skaat	S. Maimon	Static & B. El Tavori	Score	Result
I	1	Ketreyah	"Locked Out of Heaven"	No	Yes	Yes	Yes	Yes	68%	Second Round
I	2	Shefita	"My Way"	Yes	Yes	Yes	Yes	Yes	65%	Saved
II	3	Maya Bouskilla	"Euphoria"	No	Yes	Yes	Yes	No	54%	4th
II	4	Kobi Marimi	"Always"	No	Yes	Yes	Yes	Yes	79%	Second Round

Final – Second Round
Draw	Artist	Song	Jury	Viewers	Total	Place
1	Shefita	"Broken"	90	70	160	3
2	Kobi Marimi	"Let It Be"	102	113	215	1
3	Ketreyah	"Impossible"	78	87	165	2

Detailed Jury Votes
Artist	HaKokhav HaBa Judges						Jury Groups			Total
Artist	A. Amdursky	K. Peles	H. Skaat	S. Maimon	Static	B. El Tavori	Group 1	Group 2	Group 3	Total
Shefita	12	10	10	10	10	12	8	8	10	90
Kobi Marimi	8	12	12	12	12	10	12	12	12	102
Ketreyah	10	8	8	8	8	8	10	10	8	78

== At Eurovision ==
The Eurovision Song Contest 2019 took place at the Expo Tel Aviv in Tel Aviv, Israel and consisted of two semi-finals on 14 and 16 May and a final on 18 May 2019. According to Eurovision rules, all nations with the exceptions of the host country and the "Big Five" (France, Germany, Italy, Spain and the United Kingdom) were required to qualify from one of two semi-finals in order to compete for the final; the top ten countries from each semi-final progressed to the final. As the host country, Israel automatically qualified to compete in the final. In addition to its participation in the final, Israel was required to broadcast and vote in one of the two semi-finals.

Israel was drawn to compete in the second half of the final, performing 14th, receiving a total of 35 points: 35 points from the televoting and 0 points from the juries. This made it the fourth time since 2015 that the host country ranked in the bottom five.

=== Voting ===
Voting during the three shows involved each country awarding two sets of points from 1-8, 10 and 12: one from their professional jury and the other from televoting. Each nation's jury consisted of five music industry professionals who are citizens of the country they represent, with their names published before the contest to ensure transparency. This jury judged each entry based on: vocal capacity; the stage performance; the song's composition and originality; and the overall impression by the act. In addition, no member of a national jury was permitted to be related in any way to any of the competing acts in such a way that they cannot vote impartially and independently. The individual rankings of each jury member, as well as the nation's televoting results, were released shortly after the grand final.

==== Points awarded to Israel ====
Points awarded to Israel (Final)
Score	Televote	Jury
12 points	France	
10 points		
8 points		
7 points	Moldova	
6 points		
5 points	Cyprus	
4 points	Georgia	
3 points	Czech Republic; Romania	
2 points		
1 point	San Marino	

==== Points awarded by Israel ====
Points awarded by Israel (Semi-final 1)
Score	Televote	Jury
12 points	Australia	Greece
10 points	Estonia	Estonia
8 points	Cyprus	Australia
7 points	Georgia	Hungary
6 points	Czech Republic	Czech Republic
5 points	San Marino	Poland
4 points	Belarus	Cyprus
3 points	Iceland	Belgium
2 points	Poland	San Marino
1 point	Serbia	Belarus

Points awarded by Israel (Final)
Score	Televote	Jury
12 points	Russia	Netherlands
10 points	Norway	Italy
8 points	Italy	Estonia
7 points	Switzerland	Azerbaijan
6 points	Australia	Sweden
5 points	Spain	Australia
4 points	France	Malta
3 points	Azerbaijan	Switzerland
2 points	Netherlands	France
1 point	Denmark	Czech Republic

==== Detailed voting results ====
The following members comprised the Israeli jury:

- Aviad Rosenbaum (jury chairperson) – head of music Kan
- Doron Talmon – singer, songwriter
- Shlomit Aharon – professional singer, represented Israel in the 1981 contest as member of Hakol Over Habibi
- Dikla Dori (Dikla) – singer, songwriter, musician
- Avi Ochayon – songwriter and composer

Detailed voting results from Israel (Semi-final 1)
Draw	Country	Jury							Televote	
Draw	Country	D. Talmon	S. Aharon	Dikla	A. Rosenbaum	A. Ochayon	Rank	Points	Rank	Points
01	Cyprus	6	8	15	4	6	7	4	3	8
02	Montenegro	15	12	12	14	16	14		17	
03	Finland	13	15	9	7	14	12		16	
04	Poland	7	11	6	3	10	6	5	9	2
05	Slovenia	9	9	8	6	13	11		13	
06	Czech Republic	4	2	11	9	5	5	6	5	6
07	Hungary	3	5	5	2	7	4	7	11	
08	Belarus	10	6	7	11	9	10	1	7	4
09	Serbia	11	10	13	12	12	13		10	1
10	Belgium	8	7	4	10	8	8	3	14	
11	Georgia	14	13	14	13	15	15		4	7
12	Australia	2	14	2	5	3	3	8	1	12
13	Iceland	17	16	16	17	11	16		8	3
14	Estonia	5	1	3	8	1	2	10	2	10
15	Portugal	16	17	17	15	17	17		12	
16	Greece	1	3	1	1	2	1	12	15	
17	San Marino	12	4	10	16	4	9	2	6	5

Detailed voting results from Israel (Final)
Draw	Country	Jury							Televote	
Draw	Country	D. Talmon	S. Aharon	Dikla	A. Rosenbaum	A. Ochayon	Rank	Points	Rank	Points
01	Malta	9	7	7	9	7	7	4	16	
02	Albania	24	20	21	23	23	24		24	
03	Czech Republic	6	9	11	7	12	10	1	15	
04	Germany	20	15	13	24	8	18		22	
05	Russia	12	17	3	10	13	12		1	12
06	Denmark	16	11	17	15	18	20		10	1
07	San Marino	25	16	22	25	19	23		20	
08	North Macedonia	10	21	10	17	9	15		14	
09	Sweden	4	12	18	13	1	5	6	13	
10	Slovenia	18	23	15	16	25	21		19	
11	Cyprus	15	14	8	12	11	14		12	
12	Netherlands	2	2	2	2	3	1	12	9	2
13	Greece	13	18	9	11	14	16		25	
14	Israel									
15	Norway	22	8	12	14	17	17		2	10
16	United Kingdom	14	4	20	19	5	11		23	
17	Iceland	21	25	25	22	20	25		17	
18	Estonia	8	1	4	21	2	3	8	11	
19	Belarus	23	3	23	18	15	13		18	
20	Azerbaijan	1	6	16	3	16	4	7	8	3
21	France	5	10	19	6	10	9	2	7	4
22	Italy	3	5	1	1	6	2	10	3	8
23	Serbia	19	22	14	20	24	22		21	
24	Switzerland	7	13	5	5	22	8	3	4	7
25	Australia	11	24	6	4	4	6	5	5	6
26	Spain	17	19	24	8	21	19		6	5
