= SHALVA =

Israeli disability advocacy organization

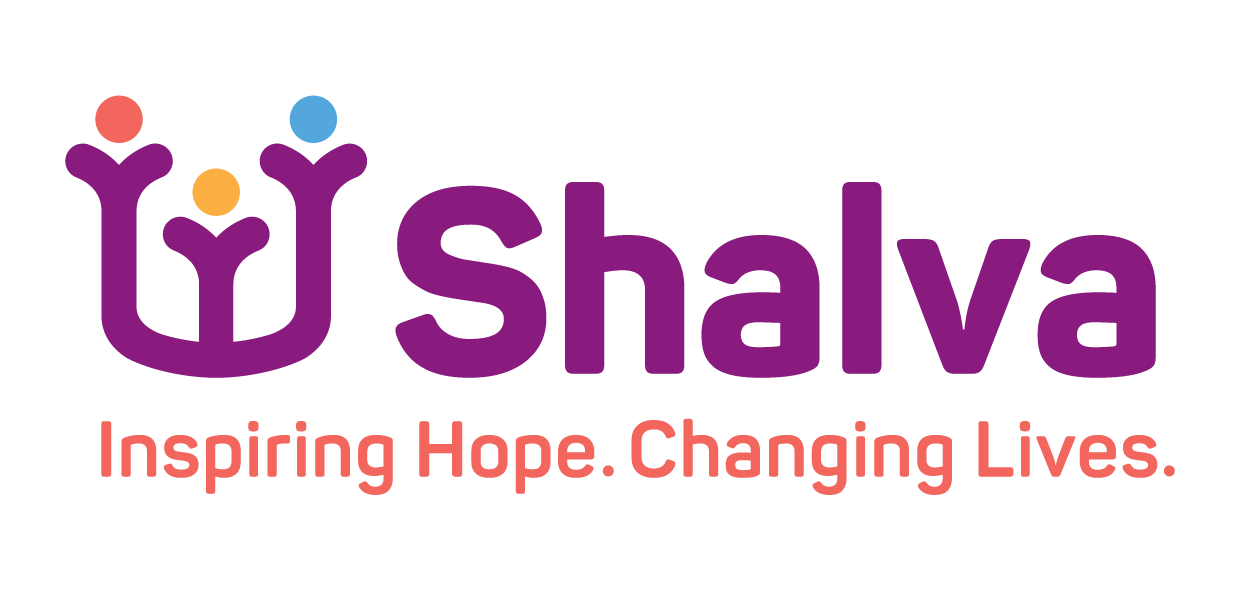
- Formation: 1990; 36 years ago
- Type: Non-profit NGO
- Purpose: supports individuals with special needs
- Headquarters: Jerusalem, Israel
- Location: 1 Shalva Road
- Region served: Israel
- Founder and President: Kalman Samuels
- Website: www.shalva.org

Shalva (The Israel Association for Care and Inclusion of Persons with Disabilities) (Hebrew: שַׁלְוָה) is a non-profit organization that supports and empowers individuals with disabilities and their families in Israel. The organization works with a wide range of individuals with disabilities: mental retardation, developmental delays, learning disabilities, attention deficit disorders, the Autism spectrum, special needs with recognized handicaps (children with minor to severe retardation, Down syndrome, Fragile X syndrome), and more.

Founded by Kalman Samuels in 1990, the organization offers a range of programs to approximately 2000 individuals with disabilities including infants, children, and youth and their families. Non-denominational and free of charge, Shalva offers a range of therapies, inclusive educational frameworks, recreational programs, vocational training, respite and family support. Shalva advocates for the inclusion of persons with disabilities through employment programs, community initiatives, and disability research. Shalva collaborates with communities worldwide as well as government, academic, and cultural institutions to pioneer innovative therapy solutions around the common goal of improving the lives of people with disabilities and promoting their inclusion in society. The organization is supported by a wide network of volunteers from the broader community as well as National Service volunteers.

Shalva's programs have been distinguished by several awards, among them: the President of Israel Prize for Excellence (1994); the Mayor of Jerusalem Award for Exceptional Service (1999); the Shalem Fund Award for "Israel's most unique program for the mentally challenged" (2004); the Knesset Speaker's Quality of Life Prize for Leadership and Public Excellence (2005); the Ruderman Foundation Prize for the integration of children with special needs (2012); and Consultant Status for the United Nations Economic and Social Council (2018). The organization's management standards are recognized by the ISO 9001/2001 certification and Midot's Seal for Outstanding Effectiveness. The story of Shalva's establishment is chronicled in a memoir by the organization's founder, Kalman Samules, published by Toby Press in May 2020 called Dreams Never Dreamed.

== Background ==
As parents of a child with disabilities, Kalman and Malki Samuels understood the need for the founding of an organization that would ease the burdens of families of children with disabilities. Their son, Yossi Samuels, was born a healthy child in 1977 however, after receiving a faulty DPT vaccination, he was rendered blind, deaf, and hyperactive. He was isolated in his own world without a method of communication. Based on their personal experience with the day-to-day challenges of raising a family and the constant need to care for a child with special needs, they decided to establish Shalva in 1990.

The first center was established in a private apartment in the Har Nof neighborhood in Jerusalem and catered to a few dozen local children. As a greater need emerged, the organization bought an additional facility on an adjacent street and began expanding its programs; the building was later called "Beit Nachshon" in memory of Nachshon Wachsman who was kidnapped and murdered by terrorists in 1994. Over the years, programs with innovative therapies were developed for infants, and the organization began to support research in various subjects in its field. Today, Shalva's programs are housed in the Shalva National Center in the Bayit Vegan near the Shaare Zedek Medical Center.

== The Shalva National Center ==
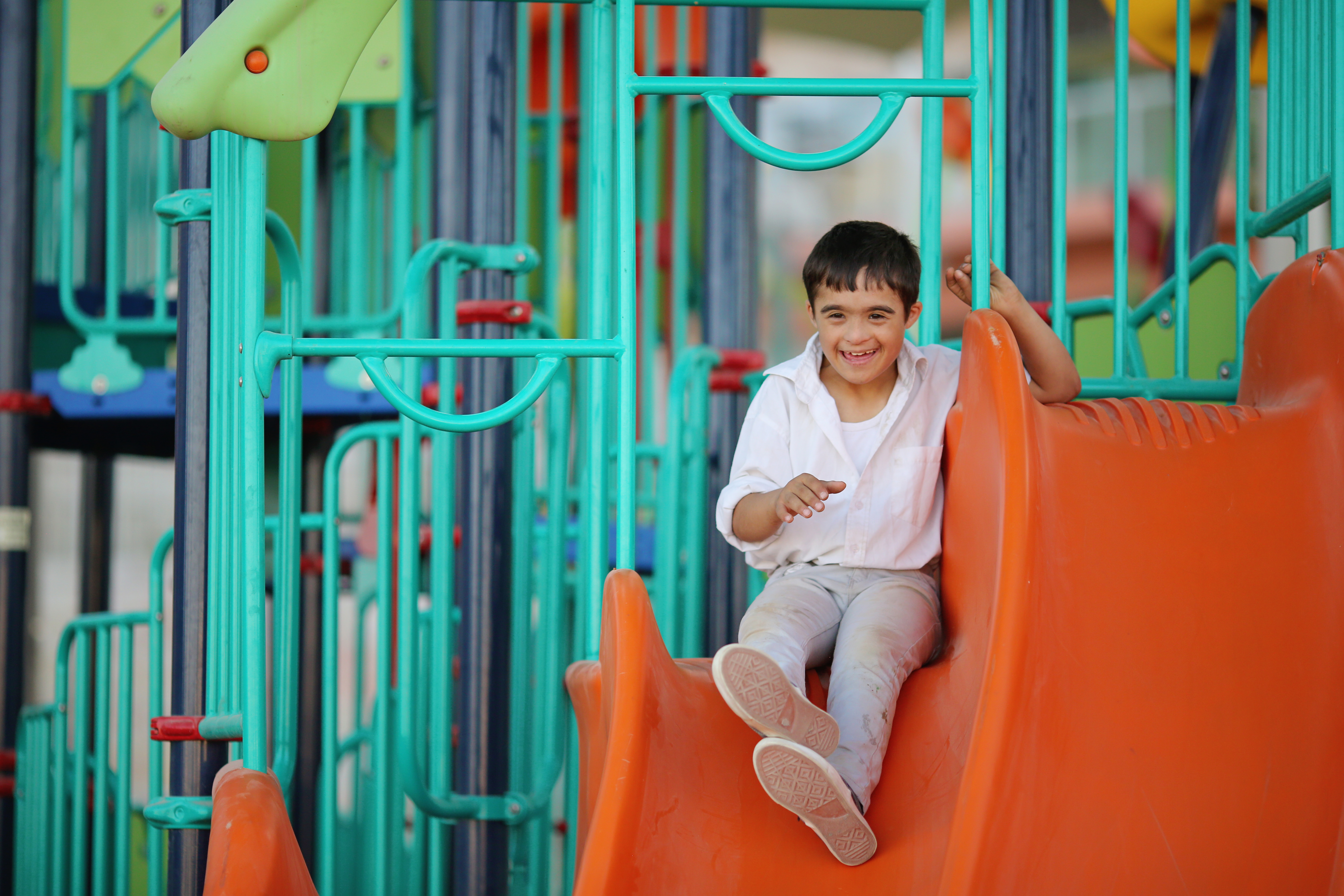
Shalva's park is the first park in Jerusalem to have inclusive, disability accessible playground installations.

Construction of the Shalva National Center began in 2008, neighboring the Shaare Zedek Medical Center in Jerusalem. The 220,000 sq.ft center opened its doors in September 2016 and has disability accessible facilities such as an auditorium, sports center, therapeutic and recreational swimming pools, fitness rooms, inclusive playgrounds and more.

Shalva National Center served as the inspiration for Jill's House, a Christian non-profit organization located in Northern Virginia.

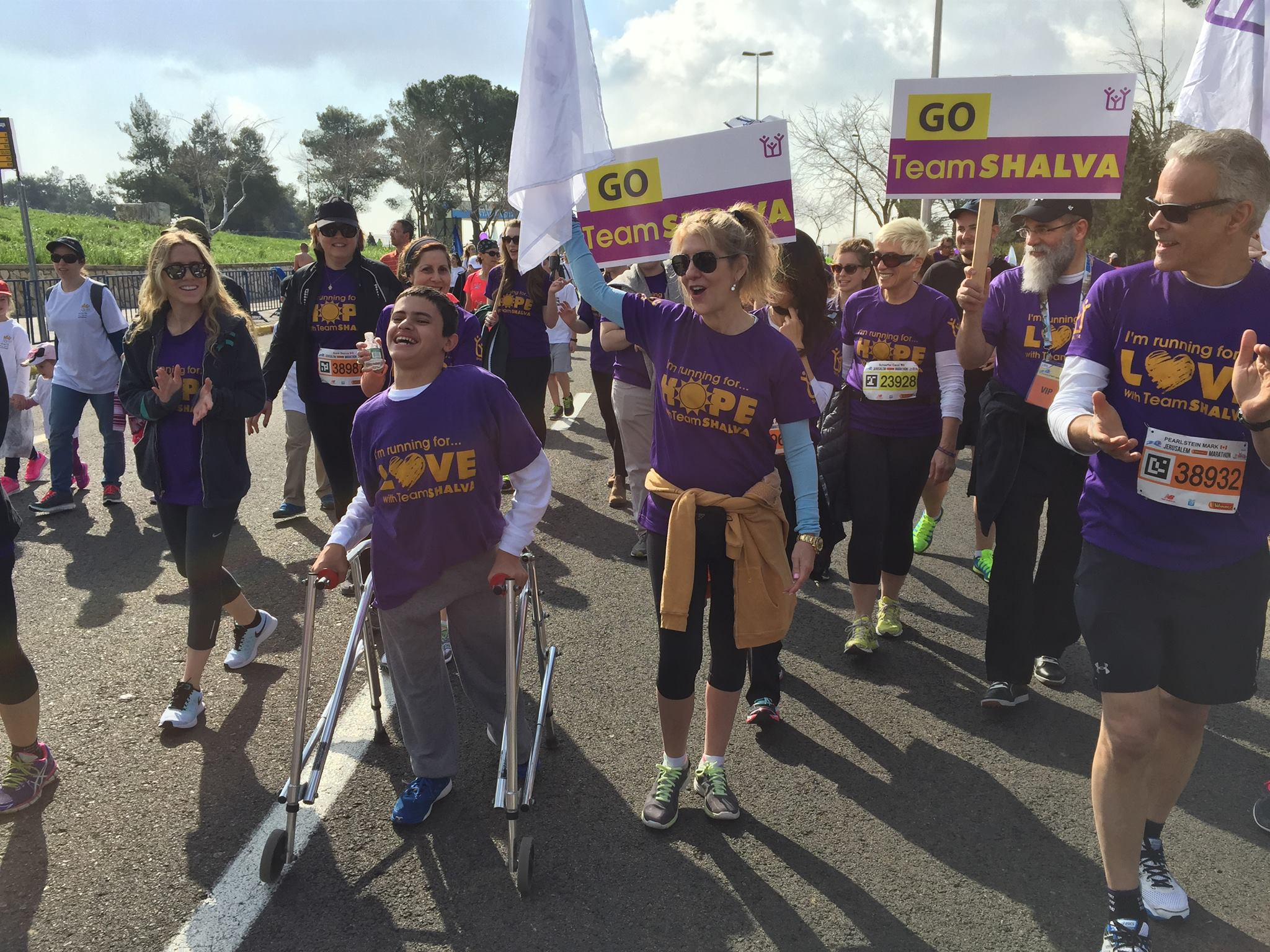
Shalva National Center

== See also ==
- Shalva band
- Kalman Samuels
- Avi Samuels
