= Shai Ben-Shushan =

Shai Ben Shushan
- Born: 20th century
- Occupations: Musician, musical director, drummer, social entrepreneur
- Award: Award for Voluntary Activity from Keren Shalem (2015)

Shai Ben-Shushan is an Israeli musician, musical director, drummer, and social entrepreneur. His work combines music, culture, and social engagement, promoting the inclusion and empowerment of people with disabilities. Ben Shushan founded the Shalva Band, a unique Israeli musical ensemble composed of musicians with various disabilities.

== Biography and military service ==
Ben-Shushan served as a combat soldier in the Duvdevan Unit. In 2002, he was wounded during an operation near Tulkarm, in which the commander of the Duvdevan Unit, Lieutenant Colonel Eyal Weiss, was killed. As part of his rehabilitation process, Ben-Shushan established the Shalva Band.

Following the October 7 attack in 2023, Ben-Shushan enlisted in the Israeli reserve forces and took part in combat during the Gaza War. During his military service, he was wounded again.

== Career ==
=== Shalva Band ===
In 2005, Ben-Shushan founded the Shalva Band during his rehabilitation from his military injury. In interviews, he described the rehabilitation period as particularly difficult, noting the transition from an independent combat soldier to relearning basic daily actions. During his hospitalization, he met a person with Down syndrome, an experience that led him to pursue work in special education through music and to join activities at the Shalva Organization.

The band consists of artists with various disabilities integrated into a professional musical ensemble. Ben-Shushan serves as the band's manager and musical director. The band participated in the television competition The Next Star for Eurovision, reaching the final stage. In 2019, the Shalva Band performed during the interval act of the Eurovision Song Contest 2019.

=== Nine Souls ===
Nine Souls is a musical ensemble composed of disabled Israel Defense Forces veterans, initiated and led by Ben-Shushan in 2014. The ensemble was featured in media coverage as part of musical initiatives integrating artists with disabilities in professional settings. In 2014, the group released a debut album and held a launch performance at the Barbie Club in Tel Aviv.

=== "Eshkol" Ashkelon ===
In 2018, Ben-Shushan served as the musical director of the Eshkol Ashkelon ensemble, a musical group of artists with disabilities operating in cooperation with the Welfare and Social Services Department of the Ashkelon Municipality. The ensemble performed at the annual Tzamid (Special Needs) Festival at the Jerusalem Theatre.

=== Composer ===
Ben-Shushan co-composed the song "A Song in Hebrew" together with Omer Habaron. The song was performed jointly by the Shalva Band and Jimbo J.

== Awards ==
- 2015– Award for Voluntary Activity from "Keren Shalem", for initiating, establishing, and managing the show "A Special Star Is Born" within the framework of the Shalva Organization, providing a stage for the artistic talents of children and youth with disabilities.
