= Kalman Samuels =

Israeli rabbi and disabilities activist (born 1951)

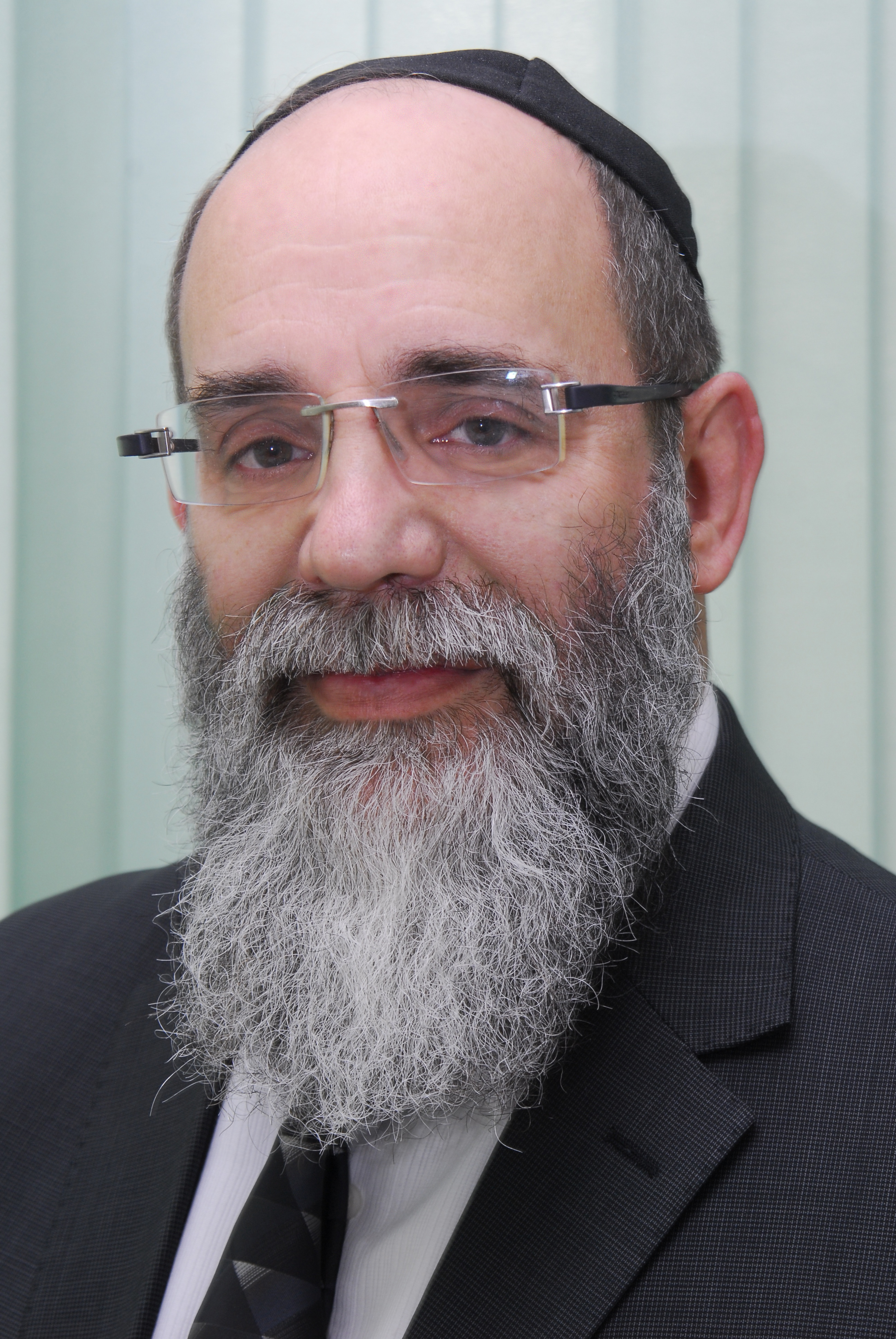
- Kalman Samuels – Shalva Founder and Chairman

Personal life
- Born: September 7, 1951 (age 74)

Religious life
- Religion: Judaism

Jewish leader
- Organisation: SHALVA
- Began: 1990

Kalman Samuels (Hebrew: קלמן סמואלס; born Kerry, September 7, 1951) is the founder of Shalva, the Israel Association for the Care and Inclusion of Persons with Disabilities. Non-denominational and free of charge, Shalva offers services to individuals with disabilities from infancy to adulthood and their families. Shalva provides a range of therapies, inclusive educational frameworks, recreational activities, vocational training as well as respite and family support. Shalva advocates for the inclusion of persons with disabilities through employment programs, community initiatives, and research. Samuels published a personal memoir in May 2020 called "Dreams Never Dreamed" telling the story of his personal journey of self-discovery and the establishment of Shalva.

== Early life ==
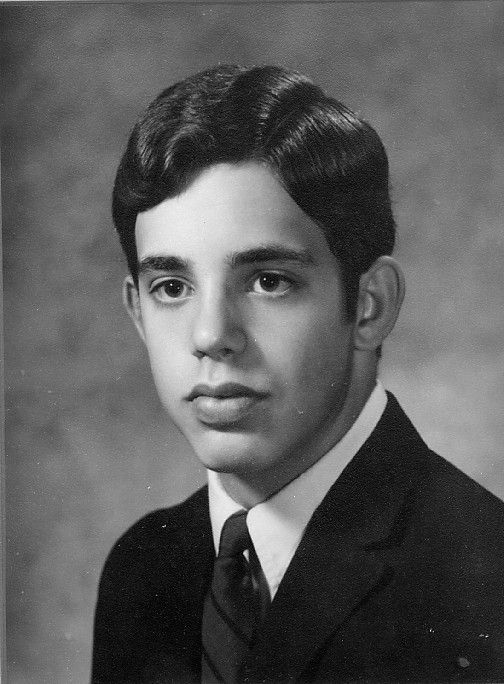
Kalman Samuels High School Yearbook picture

Kalman was raised in a non-observant Jewish home in Vancouver, British Columbia, Canada where he attended Sir Winston Churchill High School. Upon his graduation in 1969 he was given academic and basketball scholarships to the University of British Columbia. After his first year studying philosophy he traveled Europe with plans to undergo coursework in France. However his mother requested that he stop in Israel to visit relatives. Enamored with Jewish culture and heritage, he cancelled the trip to France and enrolled in several yeshivot, and in 1977 he received his rabbinical ordination.

== Marriage and birth of Yossi ==
In 1973 Samuels married Malki Klein and the couple took up residence in Jerusalem. In 1977, their second son, Yossi Samuels, at the time 11 months old, was injured by a faulty DPT vaccination and was rendered blind, deaf and acutely hyperactive. Malki prayed and vowed that if G-d helped Yossi, she would dedicate her life to helping other families with their challenges with children with disabilities After seven years of darkness and silence, Yossi experienced the Helen Keller miracle of a breakthrough to communication, initially via spelling letters via sign language in his palm and later via speech. This breakthrough was the catalyst to the establishment of Shalva. With Malki's prayers answered, it was time for her to fulfill her promise to G-d.

== Founding and expansion of Shalva ==
Learning from their experience, Malki and Kalman established an afternoon program for children with disabilities, which began as a small program with six children operating out of a Jerusalem apartment. Over time, the program expanded to meet the needs of a broader spectrum of disabilities, from birth through adulthood. Today, Shalva offers a constellation of therapeutic interventions, family support, inclusive educational frameworks, social and recreational programs and vocational training to individuals with disabilities. In recognition of Shalva's accomplishments and an ongoing need to expand the availability of special needs services, the Jerusalem Municipality provided the organization with a seven acre property adjacent to the Route 16 highway and the Shaarei Tzedek Medical Center in the Beit HaKerem neighborhood of Jerusalem. In September 2016, Shalva opened the Shalva National Center in Jerusalem and has since become an international leader in the field of disability care; housing some of Israel's largest and most advanced facilities for persons with disabilities and impacting the field of disabilities globally.

== Prizes and acknowledgments ==
- 1994 – President of Israel Prize for Excellence
- 1999 – Mayor of Jerusalem's Award for Exceptional Service
- 2004 – Shalem Foundation Award as "Israel's Most Unique Program for the Mentally Challenged"
- 2005 – Knesset Speaker's Quality of Life Prize for Leadership & Public Excellence
- 2006 – The Jerusalem Foundation Teddy Kollek Prize
- 2007 – Aminadav National Service Award for Excellence
- 2009 – Jerusalem's Award of Distinction for National Service Volunteers
- 2010 – SHALEM Foundation Award
- 2012 – The Ministry of Education Outstanding Volunteer Award
- 2018 - Sylvan Adams Nefesh B'Nefesh Bonei Tzion Prize
- 2018 - Lions International, Israel's Man of the Year Award
- 2019- Honorary Doctor of Philosophy from Bar-Ilan University
- 2019- Esteemed Fellowship from Ruppin Academic Center
- 2019- Jerusalem Prize for Dedication on Behalf of People with Disabilities
- 2020- Yakir Yerushlayaim Honored Citizen of Jerusalem Award
- 2022- Torchbearer at Israel's 74th Independence Day Torch-Lighting Ceremony

== Books ==
- 'Dreams Never Dreamed: A Mother's Promise That Transformed Her Son's Breakthrough into a Beacon of Hope" (a memoir): April 2020 and is available on Amazon. The book has been translated into Hebrew, Spanish, Portuguese, Japanese, Arabic and French.
- 'Halomot SheLo Halamti: Al Ahava, Ometz VeShinui - Siporei Hayehem Shel Meyased 'Shalva' UVeno Yossi' (Hebrew edition): The Toby Press, October 2019.
