= Shefita =

Israeli singer and voice actress

Shefita שֵׁפִיטָה
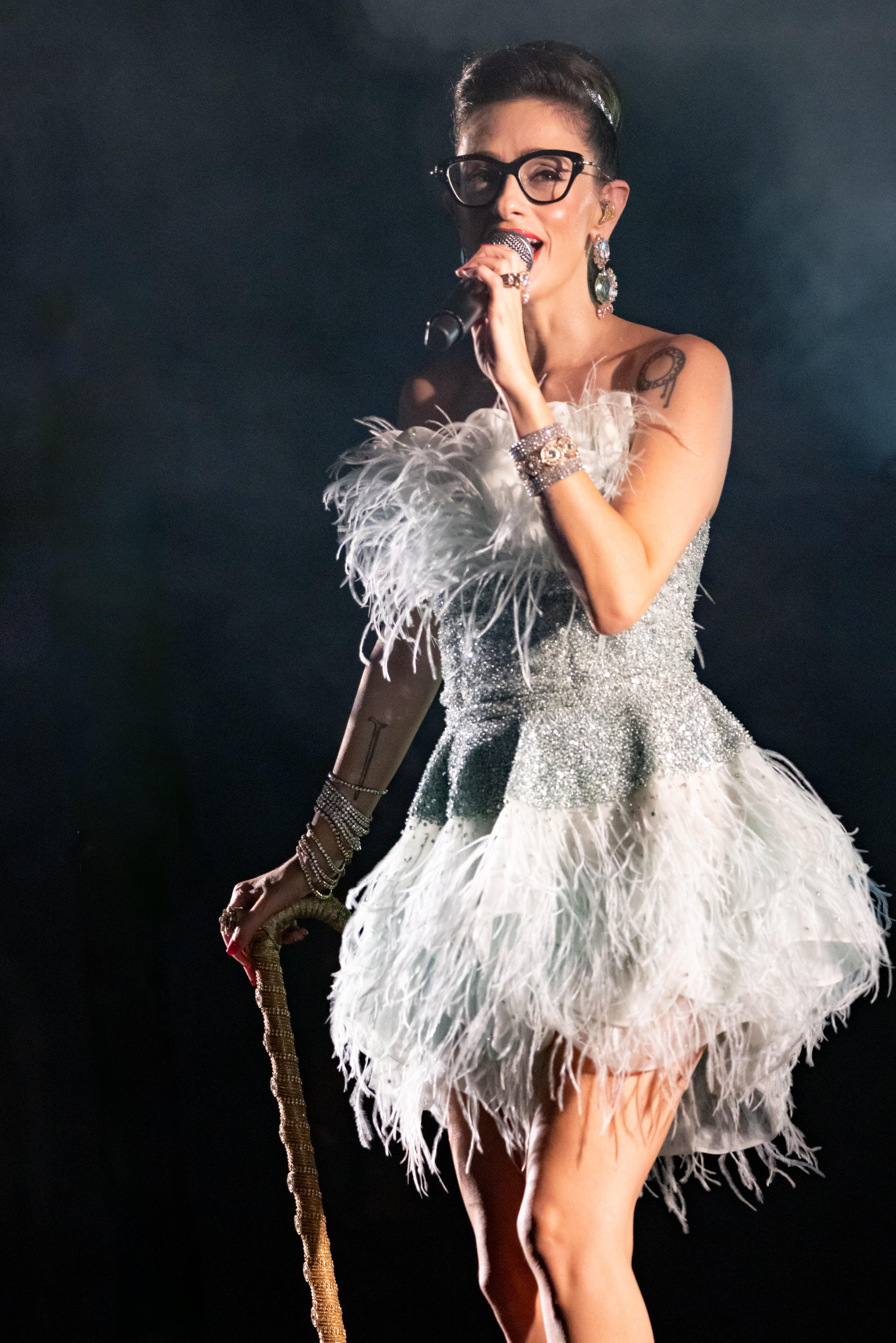
- Shefita, September 2020

Background information
- Also known as: Shefita
- Born: Rotem Shefy; 22 September 1984 (age 41); Karmiel, Israel
- Occupation: Singer
- Years active: 2011–present
- Website: shefita.com

Rotem Shefy (Hebrew: רותם שפי; born 22 September 1984), also known by her stage name Shefita (Hebrew: שֵׁפִיטָה), is an Israeli singer and voice actress. As Shefita, Shefy portrays an Arab diva, who has risen to fame by producing cover versions to famous rock songs like Radiohead's "Karma Police" and Nirvana's "Lithium". Her cover renditions have an Arabic musical influence.

Shefita was a contestant on Israel's Rising Star television show, in its 6th season, and competed to represent Israel in the Eurovision Song Contest 2019. She came in at 3rd place in show's season final which aired on February 12, 2019.

== Early life ==
Rotem Shefy was born in Karmiel, Israel, to a Jewish family, her father is of Ashkenazi Jewish descent and her mother is of Yemenite Jewish descent. In high school, she majored in theatre and film. In 2002, she joined the Israel Defense Forces and was lead singer in an Israel Air Force Ensemble until 2004. After her army service, Shefy studied at Rimon Music School and majored in voice and composition.

Shefy studied voice-acting at NLS studios and provided her voice to shows such as Kid and Cat and Pokémon and to films such as Cloudy with a Chance of Meatballs, The Princess and the Frog and Arthur and the Invisibles.

In 2011, Shefy began to perform with a band and her original material.

== Music career ==
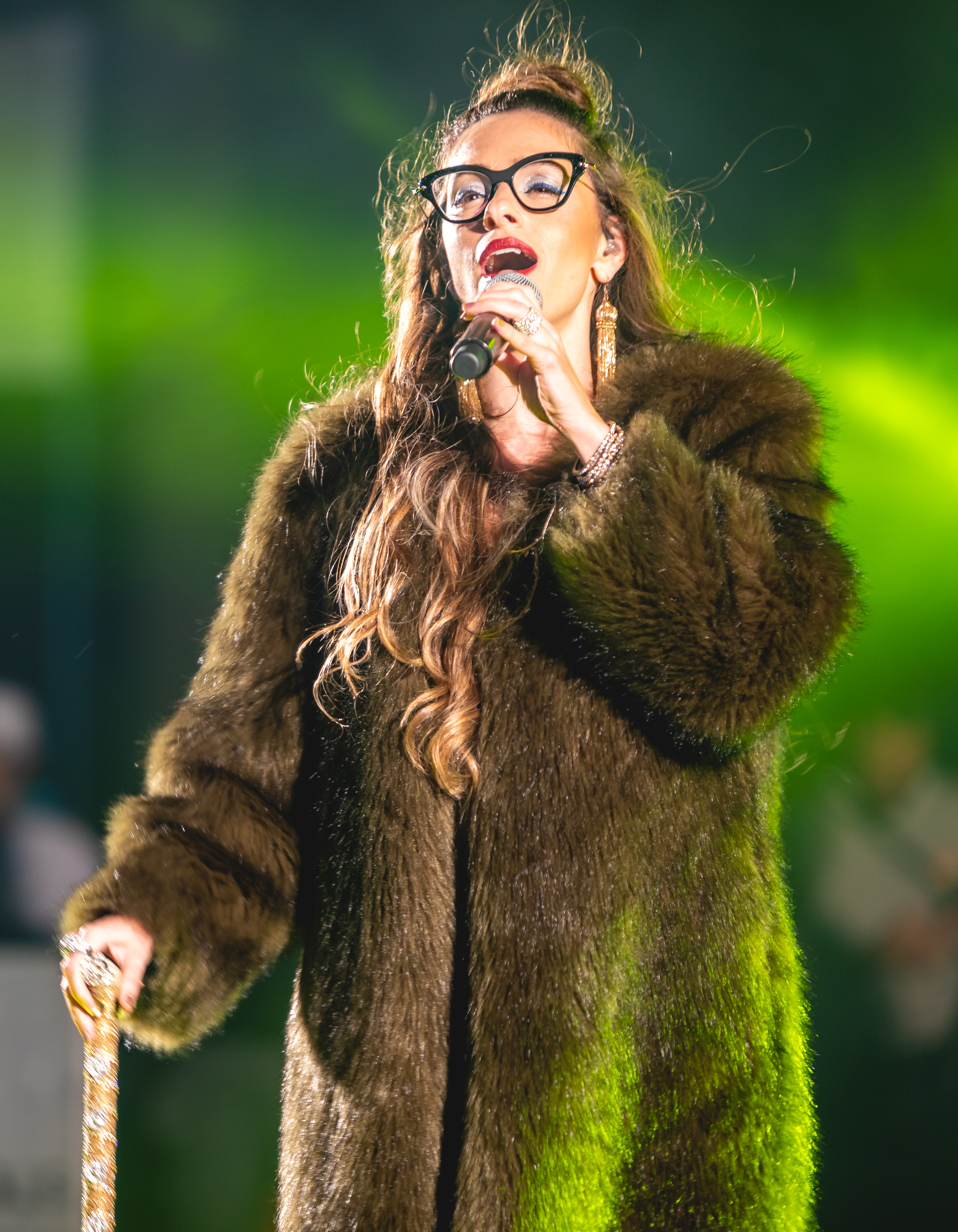
Shefita during a performance on Israeli Independence Day, May 2019

Her stage persona, Shefita, incorporates many characteristics of a diva; She wears heavy makeup, stylish evening gowns and jewelry, and walks with a stylish cane. She was supposedly born in Dubai and claims from time to time that Kurt Cobain was her lover who made her vow to sing a cover version to one of his songs before dying in her arms.

In April 2013, she released a cover version of Radiohead's "Karma Police".

In July 2015, she released a cover version of Nirvana's "Lithium". In August of the same year, she released a cover version of Naomi Shemer's "Aleph Bet".

In November 2016, she was selected by Tel Aviv municipality to perform the theme song and official video clip to the annual pride events in Tel Aviv. She would go on to perform a cover of Aerosmith's "Pink". That same month, she covered "You Oughta Know" by Alanis Morissette, who responded on her Twitter account saying it was "beautiful".

In January 2017, she appeared in an Israeli commercial for hummus.

In late 2018, she began her participation on the sixth season of Rising Star and secured her place in the show's final which aired on February 12, 2019. She finished in 3rd place, with her performances bringing a lot of comments on social media, with some accusing her of cultural appropriation.

In January 2019, Shefita got an impersonation on the popular Israeli show Eretz Nehederet. After her participation in Rising Star, she has collaborated with more mainstream Israeli artists, especially Mizrahi musicians. In February 2019, she took part in the production of the debut album He-Storia by Israeli band HaHertzelim.

In October 2020, she participated in the Tzav HaSha'a project, and performed a cover version of the song "Ma Chashuv haYom" ("What's Important Today") together with Moti Taka. In March 2021, she released a duet with Maor Edri named "Chalik" ("Enough").

In July 2021, she released "Enta" ("You", in Arabic), a bilingual cover in Arabic and English of the original song by Balqees Ahmed Fathi.

== Personal life ==
Shefita is in a long-term relationship with the musician Dekel Dvir, the drummer of the band Lola Marsh, who also collaborated with her in the musical production of her songs. The couple lives in Tel Aviv. Her parents are divorced, and she has a younger brother named Omer. In June 2021, Shefita announced she is expecting her first child.
