= Avi Samuels =

Israeli real estate entrepreneur (born 1979)

- אבי סמואלס
- Born: 1979 (age 46–47); New York
- Occupation: Real estate investor
- Children: 5

Avi Samuels (Hebrew: אבי סמואלס; born 1979) is an Israeli real estate investor. He is the chairman of Adi Capital and Terra Ltd., and previously served as CEO and Chairman of Shalva.

Samuels studied business administration at Ono Academic College. During his studies, he entered the real estate field with a fellow student, building several homes and small buildings in the Nachlaot and Rehavia neighborhoods of Jerusalem.

Samuels is married to Debbie, is a father of five, and resides in Beit Shemesh.
