= Maya Bouskilla =

Israeli singer

Maya Bouskilla מאיה בוסקילה
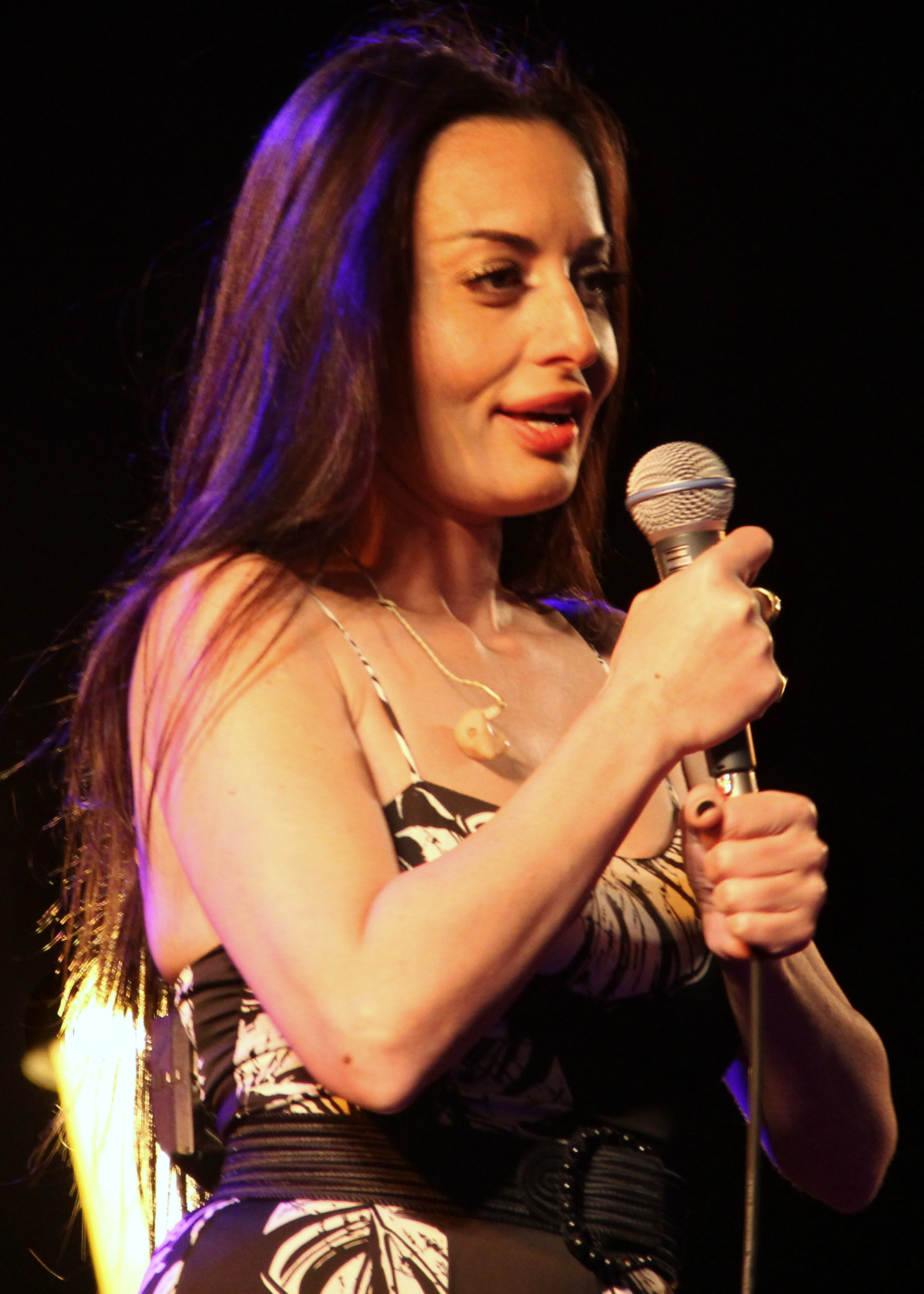
- Bousekilla in 2014

Background information
- Also known as: Maya Buskila
- Born: November 9, 1977 (age 48); Netanya, Israel
- Genres: Pop; soul
- Occupations: Singer; recording artist; performer; songwriter
- Years active: 2003–present
- Labels: Hed Arzi

Maya Bouskilla (or Buskila; Hebrew: מאיה בוסקילה; born November 9, 1977) is an Israeli singer.

== Early life ==
Buskila was born in Netanya, Israel, to a religious family of Moroccan-Jewish descent. She was discovered by a scout for Helicon Records, one of Israel's best selling labels, who heard her singing in a karaoke bar. Four years later, Roberto Ben-Shushan and Eyal Malul became her managers.

Bouskilla claimed to still be religious when she was called up for mandatory service at the age of 18 and received a deferment. In April 2008, after criticism of her draft-dodging, Bouskilla voluntarily enlisted to the Israeli military for a short period, reportedly so she could set a good example for other young Israeli women. Her enlistment at the age of 30 made her one of the oldest new recruits ever to join the Israel Defense Forces.

== Career ==
=== Music ===
In 2004, Bouskilla's debut album, Sold Out Story, sold 20,000 copies in the first three weeks. In February 2005, Maya was awarded for being the "Female Artist of the Year" and "Breaking Artist of the Year" in the Israeli Annual Hebrew Song Chart. Bouskilla was also named "Singer of the Year" in 2005 by the Israeli Music Channel (Channel 24).

In 2006 she released her second album, "Days of Love". Among the songs is the song "Without You", The song originally represented Spain in the Eurovision Song Contest 2003 by singer Beth and was named Dime.

Bouskilla was a possible choice to represent Israel in the Eurovision Song Contest 2009 but she bowed out at the last minute. She was tipped again to represent Israel at the Eurovision Song Contest 2011. She was also reportedly considered for the 2012 edition in Baku.

=== Television and film ===
In 2006, Bouskilla starred as Margalit in Menahem Golan's film Days of Love.

In 2009, she appeared as a contestant on the TV programme HaAh HaGadol VIP 1 on Channel 2, the celebrity season for the Israeli version of Big Brother.

== Discography ==
- 2004 – Sipur Machur (Sold Out Story)
- 2006 – Yamim Shel Ahava (Days of Love)
- 2008 – Shoveret Shtika (Breaking the Silence)
- 2016 – Noshemet (Breathing)
