= Shalva Band =

Israeli musical band

Shalva Band להקת שלווה
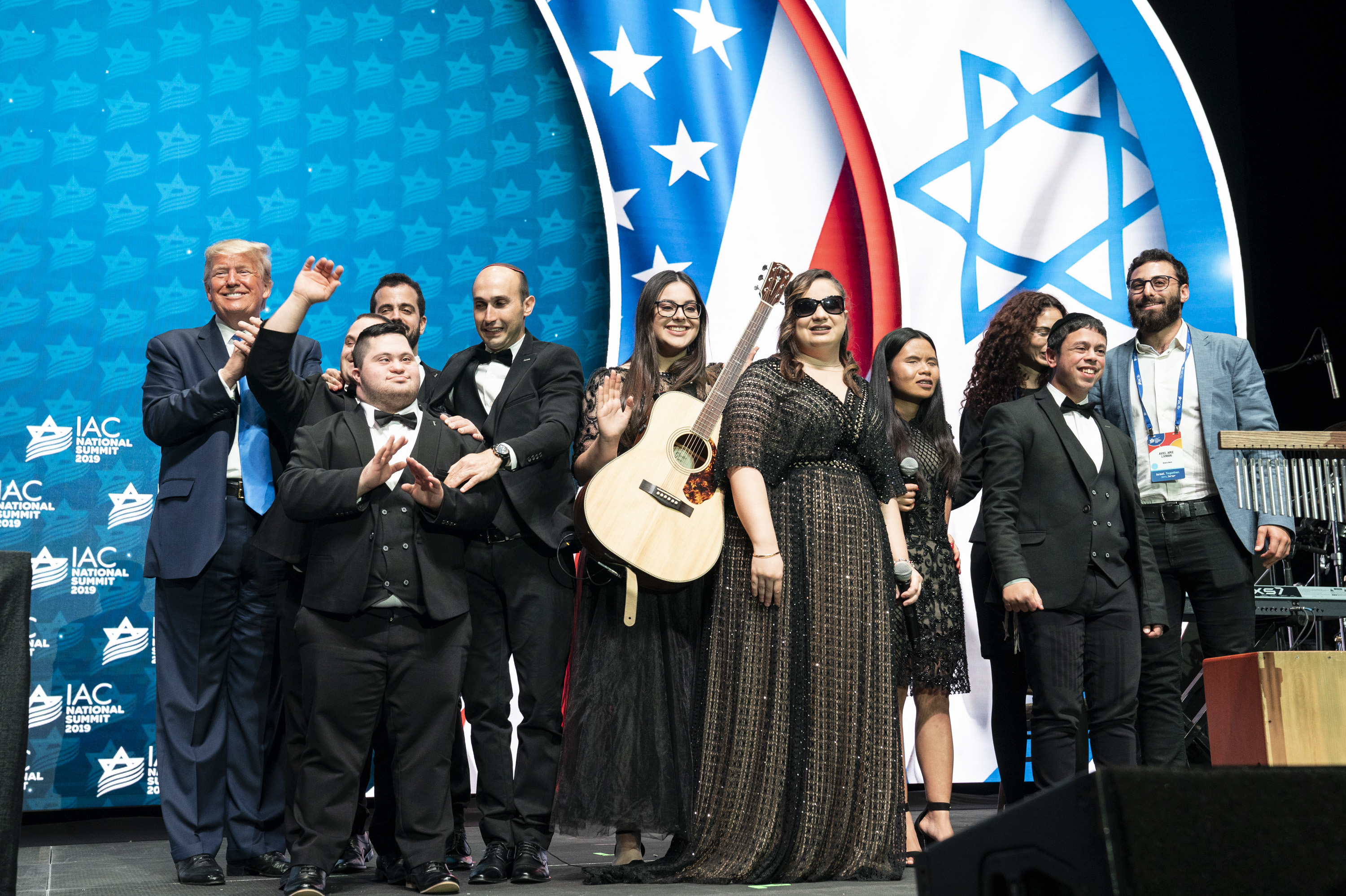
- U.S. President Donald Trump applauds the Shalva Band, performers at the Israeli-American Council National Summit (2019)

Background information
- Origin: Israel
- Years active: 2005–present
- Website: www.shalva.org/shalva-band/

The Shalva Band (Hebrew: להקת שלווה, romanized: Lehakat Shalva) is an Israeli band consisting of five disabled musicians.

== History ==
The band was established in 2005 by Shai Ben-Shushan as part of his personal rehabilitation journey. In collaboration with the SHALVA organizations music program, which supports and empowers individuals with disabilities and their families in Israel, the band has been a global representative of inclusion and integration of people with disabilities in society.

International singers and actors, including Demi Lovato and Jamie Foxx, have praised the band.

=== Shows and Performances ===
In 2019 the band gained public interest when it competed in HaKokhav HaBa, a music reality show which selects the Israeli representative to the Eurovision Song Contest. The band reached the final stages of qualification, but later learned that they would be required to disobey Shabbat observance during rehearsals for Eurovision. Ultimately, they decided to respect the religious beliefs of several band members and withdrew from HaKokhav HaBa.

After withdrawing from the contest, the band invited to perform as the interval act of the second semi-final of the Eurovision Song Contest 2019 without violating the beliefs of any member of the band. They performed a cover of "A Million Dreams". A few days before performing at Eurovision, the band also performed at the torch-lighting ceremony that opens the celebrations of the Israeli Independence Day.

In May 2019, the Shalva band led a social campaign together with Bank Hapoalim under the name "The door is open for everyone" aimed at promoting the integration of people with disabilities through the signing of the integration agreement. As part of the campaign, the band launched their new song "The door is always open".

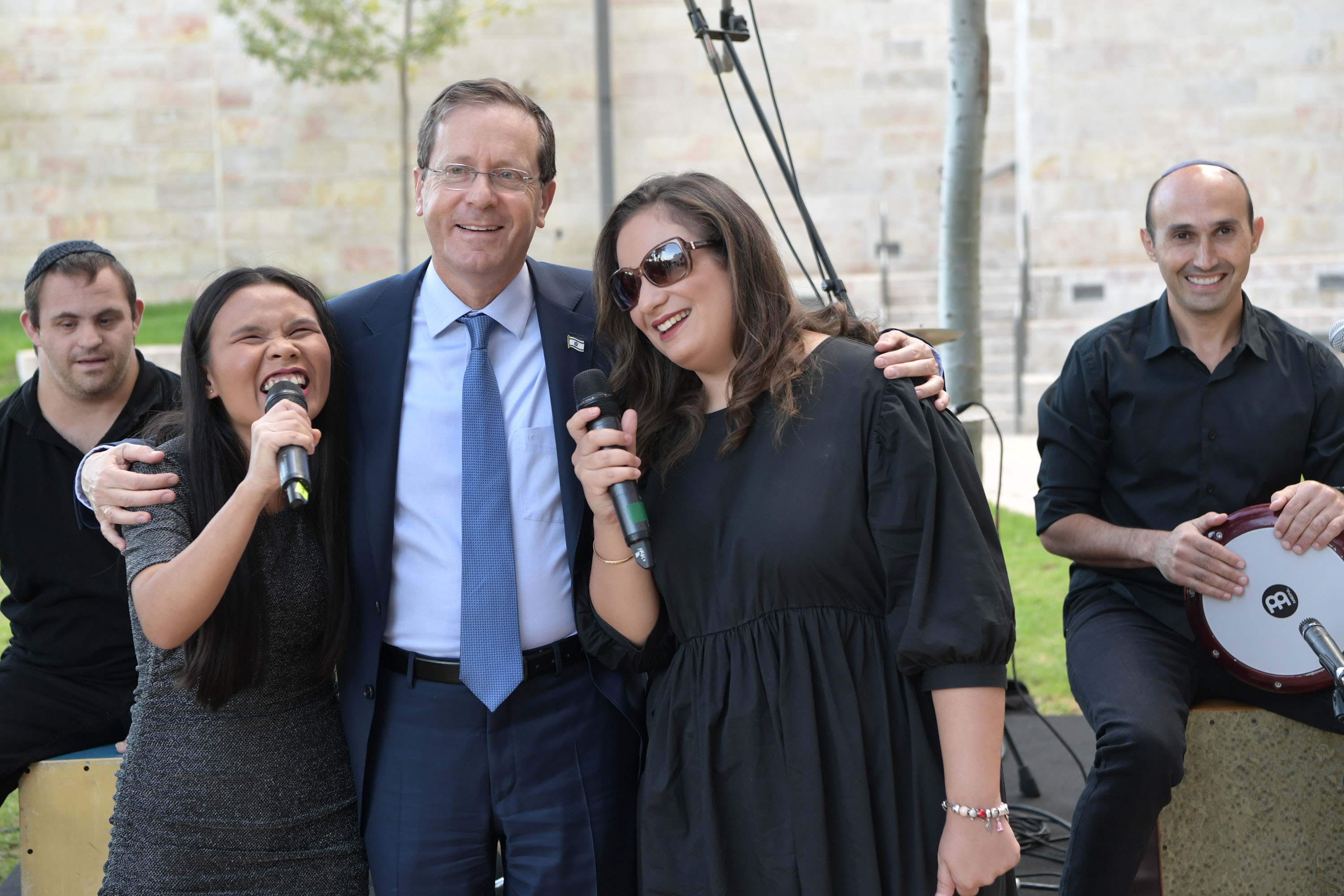
President Isaac Herzog with the Shalva Band, September 2021

In December 2019, the band appeared for its US debut show at the conference of the Israeli-American Council (IAC), in Florida in front of then President of the United States, Donald Trump, who hugged the members of the band at the end of their performance.

In May 2023, the band performed on the stage of the United Nations in Geneva, in honor of Israel's 75th Independence Day, for hundreds of diplomats.

On 4 October 2023, the Shalva band performed at an international music festival with an orchestra for the blind that takes place in Seoul, South Korea, in which many countries took part including Taiwan, Hong Kong, Thailand, Japan, Korea and Israel.

The band has performed dozens of times in Israel and around the world in conferences, cultural events, and in ceremonies, including the official residence of the President of Israel.

Over the years the band has cooperated with leading musicians from Israel, including Shlomi Shabat, Avraham Fried, Moshe Peretz, Eyal Golan, David Broza, Idan Amedi, Shiri Maimon, Yonatan Razel, and Natan Goshen.

== Band members ==
- Anael Shira Khalifa (vocals) — one of the main vocalists of the band, visually impaired. She started singing at the age of five and immigrated to Israel from France at the age of eight. “Despite our challenges, music gives us the ability to see the light in everything. And gives us the strength to continue and connect between worlds...”
- Dina Samte (vocals) — Dina immigrated to Israel at the age of ten from Manipur in India. Dina, who became blind at the age of 6, learned Hebrew through music. In 2017 Dina was chosen to light one of the Israel Independence Day torches at the official state ceremony.
- Yosef Ovadia (drums) — Yosef is diagnosed with Williams syndrome. Yosef joined the band as a singer and when his voice changed he started playing drums.
- Yair Vomberg (percussions) — Yair is diagnosed with Down syndrome. Yair is a graduate of the Shalva organisation, today living independently in the Shalva supervised homes. In addition to Yair music career, he works in the ceramic workshop and the tea factory in the Shalva center.
- Shai Ben-Shushan (founder and musical director) — Shai is a musician and drummer. Shai established the band as part of his personal rehabilitation journey after being seriously injured in the IDF.

== See also ==
- Music in Israel
- Special Needs (band)
