= Ori Coltov =

Ori Coltov אורי כלטוב
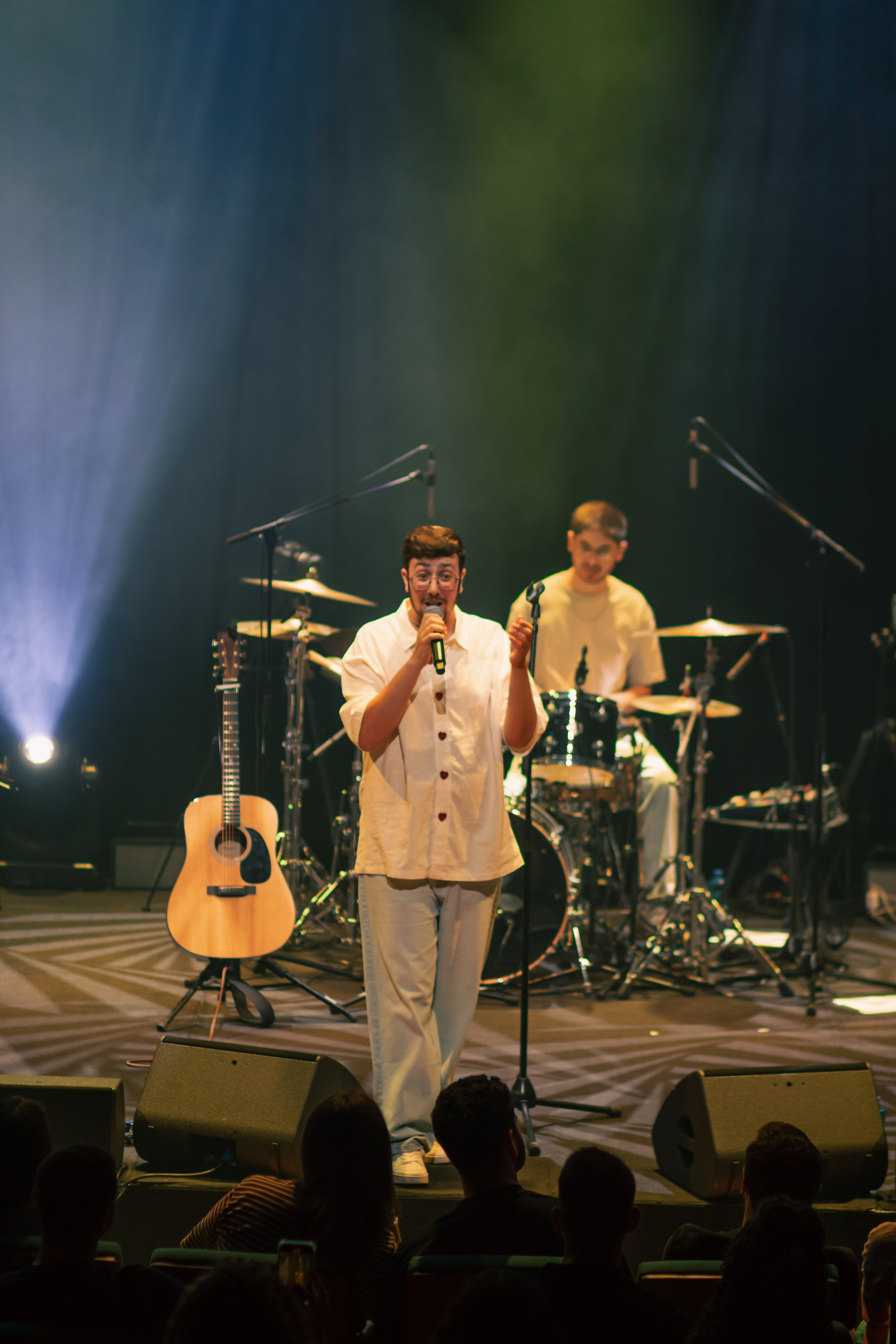

Background information
- Born: 3 July 2002 (age 23); Jerusalem, Israel
- Genres: Pop
- Occupations: Singer; songwriter
- Years active: 2022–present

Ori Coltov (Hebrew: אורי כלטוב; born July 3, 2002) is an Israeli singer-songwriter and compose.

== Biography ==
Coltov was born and raised in Jerusalem. His grandfather was Moshe Chen, who served for many years as a program editor for Kol Yisrael. Coltov attended the Noam High School Yeshiva in Jerusalem. At the age of 13, Coltov participated with his sister Noam in the third season of the television program "Beit Sefer LeMusica", where they were called "The Coltov Brothers". During his high school years, he was a member of several ensembles, and also founded his own ensemble called "Project A2". He served his military service in the Education Corps Band, and during that time he began performing throughout the country with music he had created.

In February 2023, Coltov released his debut single, "No Time to Die Now", produced by Stav Beger. In May 2023, he released his second song, "A Crazy Night Like This". In December 2023, he collaborated as an independent artist with the Education and Youth Corps, and together they released the single "In One Morning", which Coltov wrote and composed. In February 2024, he released another single, "Waiting for a Miracle", which he co-wrote with Nathan Goshen. The single, along with his first two songs, was included on Coltov's first album.

His first album, "Someone Hears Me", was released on April 14, 2024.

In July 2024, he released the single "Edom Edom" with singer Enosh. In August 2024, he released a live version, from the launch show for his first album, of his song "Esir Minuten" which closes the album.

In December 2024, he released the single "La Ko't Ha'il L'he'it L'bev" from his second album. In February 2025, he released the single "Amala" and in March 2025, he released the single "Aikh Shola T'hey", both also from the second album. His second album, "Mach'alif Mangina", was released on 2025.

Coltov also writes and composes for other singers. In 2023, he composed the single "Gem Ki Alech" for singer Shuli Rand in collaboration with producer Stav Beger. In 2025, he wrote and composed the song "Give Me Time" with singer Noam Kleinstein. In December 2025, he released the duet "How Alone I Am" with Noam Kleinstein.

== Discography ==
=== Albums ===
- מישהו שומע אות (2024)

=== Singles ===
- (2023) לא זמן למות עכשיו
- (2024) כמה לבד לי
