= Toy (song) =

2018 song by Netta Barzilai

Single by Netta

from the EP Goody Bag
- Released: 11 March 2018
- Recorded: 2018
- Genre: Dance-pop; Mizrahi; electropop
- Length: 3:00
- Label: Tedy Productions; Unicell; S-Curve (US)
- Songwriters: Doron Medalie; Stav Beger; Jack White (Note: In 2019, Jack White was added as co-credit composer after Universal Music Group and the Israeli composers reached an agreement over copyright claims.)
- Producer: Stav Beger

Netta singles chronology
"Toy" (2018)	"Bassa Sababa" (2019)

Audio sample
- file; help

Music video
- "Toy" on YouTube

Eurovision Song Contest 2018 entry
- Country: Israel
- Artist: Netta
- Languages: English (Note: Contains several words in Hebrew.)
- Composers: Doron Medalie; Stav Beger
- Lyricists: Doron Medalie; Stav Beger

Finals performance
- Semi-final result: 1st
- Semi-final points: 283
- Final result: 1st
- Final points: 529

Entry chronology
- ◄ "I Feel Alive" (2017)
- "Home" (2019) ►

Official performance video
- "Toy" (First semi-final) on YouTube "Toy" (Final) on YouTube "Toy" (Reprise) on YouTube

"Toy" (Hebrew transliteration: טוי) is the debut single by singer Netta Barzilai, composed and written by Doron Medalie and the song's producer Stav Beger. The song was released on 11 March 2018 along with its official music video clip, which was directed by Keren Hochma. It represented Israel in the Eurovision Song Contest 2018 held in Lisbon, winning the contest.

The song reached the top of the charts in Israel. It held the title of the most viewed video on the Eurovision Song Contest's YouTube channel until it was surpassed by Russia's 2020 entry "Uno" in July 2020.

== Background ==
=== Conception ===
"Toy" was composed and written by Doron Medalie and the song's producer Stav Beger. Its lyrics are mostly in English, with the exception of the Hebrew phrase אני לא בובה (ani lo buba, "I am not a doll"), and the slang word סטפה (stefa, meaning a pile of banknotes). The Japanese word baka (バカ "stupid") is also used extensively and the Pokémon character Pikachu is referenced once. "Trump-pam-pau" refers to the then-President of the United States, Donald Trump, as Doron Medalie revealed in April 2019 to the Israeli media.

=== Selection and release ===
Between 29 October 2017 and 13 February 2018, Netta competed in HaKokhav HaBa L'Eurovizion –the fifth season of HaKokhav HaBa–, the show that the Israeli Public Broadcasting Corporation (IPBC/Kan) used to select its performer for the 63rd edition of the Eurovision Song Contest. She won the competition and became the Israeli performer for Eurovision. A committee of the IPBC/Kan internally selected later for her the song "Toy" as the Israeli entrant for the contest.

"Toy" was released on 11 March 2018 along with its official music video clip, which was directed by Keren Hochma. The song was leaked online a day before the official release.

=== Eurovision ===
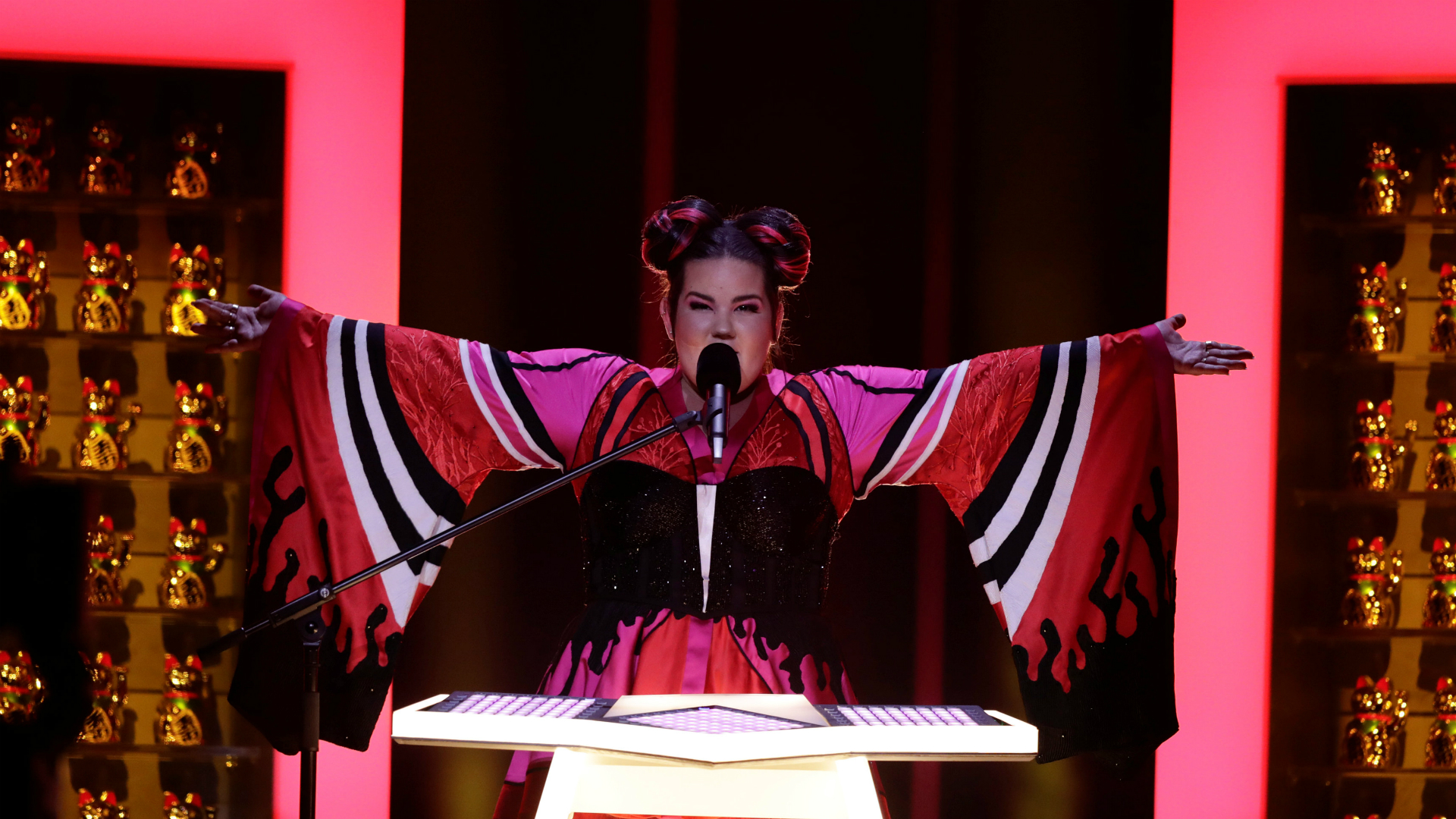
Netta in the winning reprise of "Toy"

On 8 May 2018, the first semi-final of the Eurovision Song Contest was held at the Lisbon Arena in Lisbon hosted by Rádio e Televisão de Portugal (RTP) and broadcast live throughout the continent and abroad. Netta performed "Toy" seventh in a field of nineteen songs, and qualified for the grand final. After the grand final it was revealed that it had achieved first place, based on a combination of fourth placing from televote and first from jury.

On 12 May 2018, Netta performed again "Toy" twenty-second in a field of twenty-six in the grand final of the Eurovision Song Contest. At the close of voting, the song placed first winning the contest, based on third placing with 212 points from the jury and winning the televote with 317 points, achieving overall first place with a combined score of 529 points. Its win marks Israel's fourth win at Eurovision along with the wins in 1978, 1979, and 1998.

=== Aftermath ===
As the winning broadcaster, the European Broadcasting Union (EBU) gave IPBC/Kan the responsibility to host the following edition of the Eurovision Song Contest. Its first semi-final, held on 14 May 2019 in Tel Aviv, opened with Netta performing a new version of "Toy". She also appeared in the opening sequence of the grand final held on 18 May 2019, performed her new single "Nana Banana" as part of the interval acts, and presented the trophy to the winner. Also in the grand final, Verka Serduchka performed "Toy" as part of the "Switch Song" interval act.

The song held the title of the most viewed video on the Eurovision Song Contest's YouTube channel until it was surpassed by Russia's 2020 entry "Uno" in July 2020.

== Critical reception ==
Charlotte Runcie of The Daily Telegraph awarded the song five stars out of five, describing it as "gloriously bizarre pop" with "playful lyrics and a powerful vocal performance". In 2022, Ben Kelly of The Independent named it 39th best Eurovision-winning song of all time.

Allegations were made that the performance of the song at Eurovision featured appropriation of Japanese cultural imagery as a "prop", including Netta wearing a kimono and buns, and the performance's staging featuring Maneki-nekos — a Japanese symbol of good luck. Netta did not respond to the allegations, but did state in previous interviews that she was a fan of Japanese popular culture, particularly the Pokémon franchise.

== Copyright claim ==
On 3 July 2018, Israeli infotainer Guy Pines reported that Universal Music Group may file a lawsuit claiming "Toy" similarities in rhythm and harmony with The White Stripes' song "Seven Nation Army". Universal sent a pre-suit notice letter to the songwriters Doron Medalie and Stav Beger, claiming copyright infringement. In February 2019 the Israeli composers agreed to give writing credit to Jack White, and a share in the royalties for the song. Medalie and Beger had reportedly agreed to give Universal some of the song's distribution rights in certain territories, potentially exposing the song to an even larger audience.

== Credits and personnel ==
Recording and management

- Recorded at Stav Beger Studios (Tel Aviv)
- Published by Tedy Productions and Unicell

Personnel

- Netta – vocals, loop arrangements
- Doron Medalie – composition
- Stav Beger – composition, production, percussion, mixing and mastering
- Jack White – composition
- Avshalom Ariel – loop arrangements
- Ami Ben Abu – keyboards
- Shimon Yihye – guitars
- Daniel Rubin, Maayan Bukris and Liron Carakukly – background vocals

== Commercial performance ==
The song reached the top of the charts in Israel.

=== Weekly charts ===
Chart (2018–19)	Peak position
Austria (Ö3 Austria Top 40)	15
Belgium (Ultratop 50 Flanders)	29
Belgium (Ultratip Bubbling Under Wallonia)	19
Czech Republic Singles Digital (ČNS IFPI)	88
Euro Digital Songs (Billboard)	9
Finland (Suomen virallinen lista)	10
France (SNEP)	117
Germany (GfK)	19
Greece Digital Singles (IFPI Greece)	12
Hungary (Stream Top 40)	36
Ireland (IRMA)	63
Israel (Media Forest)	1
Netherlands (Single Top 100)	60
Norway (VG-lista)	19
Scottish Singles Sales (Official Charts)	28
Spain (PROMUSICAE)	16
Sweden (Sverigetopplistan)	5
Switzerland (Schweizer Hitparade)	34
Turkey (Radiomonitor Top 100)	36
UK Singles (Official Charts)	49
US Dance Club Songs (Billboard)	1
US Hot Dance/Electronic Songs (Billboard)	11

=== Year-end charts ===
Chart (2018)	Position
US Dance Club Songs (Billboard)	48
US Hot Dance/Electronic Songs (Billboard)	78

Chart (2019)	Position
US Hot Dance/Electronic Songs (Billboard)	45

=== Decade-end charts ===
Chart (2010–19)	Peak position
Israel (Mako)	1
Israel (Walla!)	5
Israel (Kan Gimmel)	32

=== Certifications ===
Region	Certification	Certified units/sales
Brazil (Pro-Música Brasil)	3× Platinum	120,000^{‡}
Poland (ZPAV)	Gold	25,000^{‡}
^{‡} Sales+streaming figures based on certification alone.

== Legacy ==
The song is featured in the game Just Dance 2019.

== Notes ==
Preceded by "Amar pelos dois" by Salvador Sobral	Eurovision Song Contest winners 2018	Succeeded by "Arcade" by Duncan Laurence
