= Goody Bag (Netta EP) =

EP by Netta
- Released: 25 June 2020
- Recorded: 2018–20
- Length: 17:37
- Language: English; Hebrew
- Label: Tedy Productions; BMG
- Producer: Stav Beger; Tha Aristocrats; Avshalom Ariel; J. R. Rotem; Bert Elliott

Netta chronology
Goody Bag (2020)	The Best of Netta's Office, Vol. 1 (2020)

Singles from Goody Bag
- 1. "Toy" Released: 11 March 2018; 2. "Bassa Sababa" Released: 1 February 2019; 3. "Nana Banana" Released: 10 May 2019; 4. "Ricki Lake" Released: 6 February 2020; 5. "Cuckoo" Released: 15 May 2020

Goody Bag is the debut extended play by Israeli singer Netta. It was released on 25 June 2020 through Tedy Productions and BMG Rights Management. It contains five singles released over a span of two years, including "Toy", the winning song of the Eurovision Song Contest 2018.

== Background and release ==
In September 2017, Barzilai auditioned for season 5 of HaKokhav HaBa, Israel's national selection for the Eurovision Song Contest, with "Rude Boy" by Rihanna. After receiving 82% of the votes, she advanced to the second stage of the competition where she sang "Hey Mama" by David Guetta. In February 2018, she performed "Wannabe" by the Spice Girls, and although she lost a duel to Ricky Ben Ari, she proceeded to the next stage after being selected by the judges. The last song Barzilai performed in the competition was a mashup of "Gangnam Style" by Psy and "Tik Tok" by Kesha. After receiving 210 points from the judges and audience, Barzilai won first place and the right to represent Israel in Eurovision.

On 25 February 2018, it was reported that the song that Barzilai would perform at the contest was called "Toy" and that it would be performed in English, apart from a phrase in Hebrew. The song was written and composed by Doron Medalie and Stav Beger, and produced by Beger. The song was released on 11 March 2018, and its music video went on to receive more than 20 million views two months before the beginning of the contest. On 14 April 2018, Barzilai performed her song at Eurovision in Concert in Amsterdam, the largest Eurovision promotional event.

On 8 May 2018, Barzilai participated in the first semi-final of the Eurovision Song Contest, winning the semi-final with 283 points and qualifying for the final on 12 May. In the final, she placed first with televoters and third with international juries, amassing 529 points in total and winning the competition ahead of Cyprus' Eleni Foureira.

Barzilai's second single "Bassa Sababa" was released on 1 February 2019, catching attention from Perez Hilton and James Charles. On 14 May 2019, Barzilai opened the Eurovision Song Contest 2019 in Tel Aviv with another "Toy" performance. Four days later, she performed her third single "Nana Banana" in the grand final. On 16 May 2020, she performed her fifth single "Cuckoo" on Eurovision: Europe Shine a Light, a live television programme organized to replace the Eurovision Song Contest 2020, which was cancelled due to the COVID-19 pandemic. The music video for "Cuckoo" was released on 12 June 2020, with Barzilai announcing the release of the EP.

== Track listing ==
Credits adapted from Deezer.

No.	Title	Writer(s)	Producer(s)	Length
1.	"Toy"	Doron Medalie; Stav Beger; Netta Barzilai	Beger	3:00
2.	"Bassa Sababa"	Avshalom Ariel; Beger; Barzilai	Beger	2:58
3.	"Nana Banana"	Nathan Goshen; Beger; Barzilai	Beger	3:04
4.	"Ricki Lake"	Brandi Nicole Flores; Chaz Jackson; Dashawn “Happie” White; Emily Vaughn; Barzilai	Tha Aristocrats; Ariel	2:10
5.	"Cuckoo"	Bert Elliott; Krysta Marie Youngs; Barzilai	J. R. Rotem; Elliott	3:13
6.	"Cuckoo" (Music Box Version)	Elliott; Youngs; Barzilai	J. R. Rotem; Elliott	3:12
Total length:				17:37
