= Goodie bag =

Goodie or Goody bag may refer to:

- Promotional merchandise
- Party favor
- Goody Bag (Kim Heechul & Kim Jungmo EP), 2016
- Goody Bag (Netta EP), 2020
- "Goodie Bag", a song by Still Woozy
