= Hanan Ben Ari =

Israeli singer-songwriter (born 1988)

Hanan Ben Ari חנן בן ארי
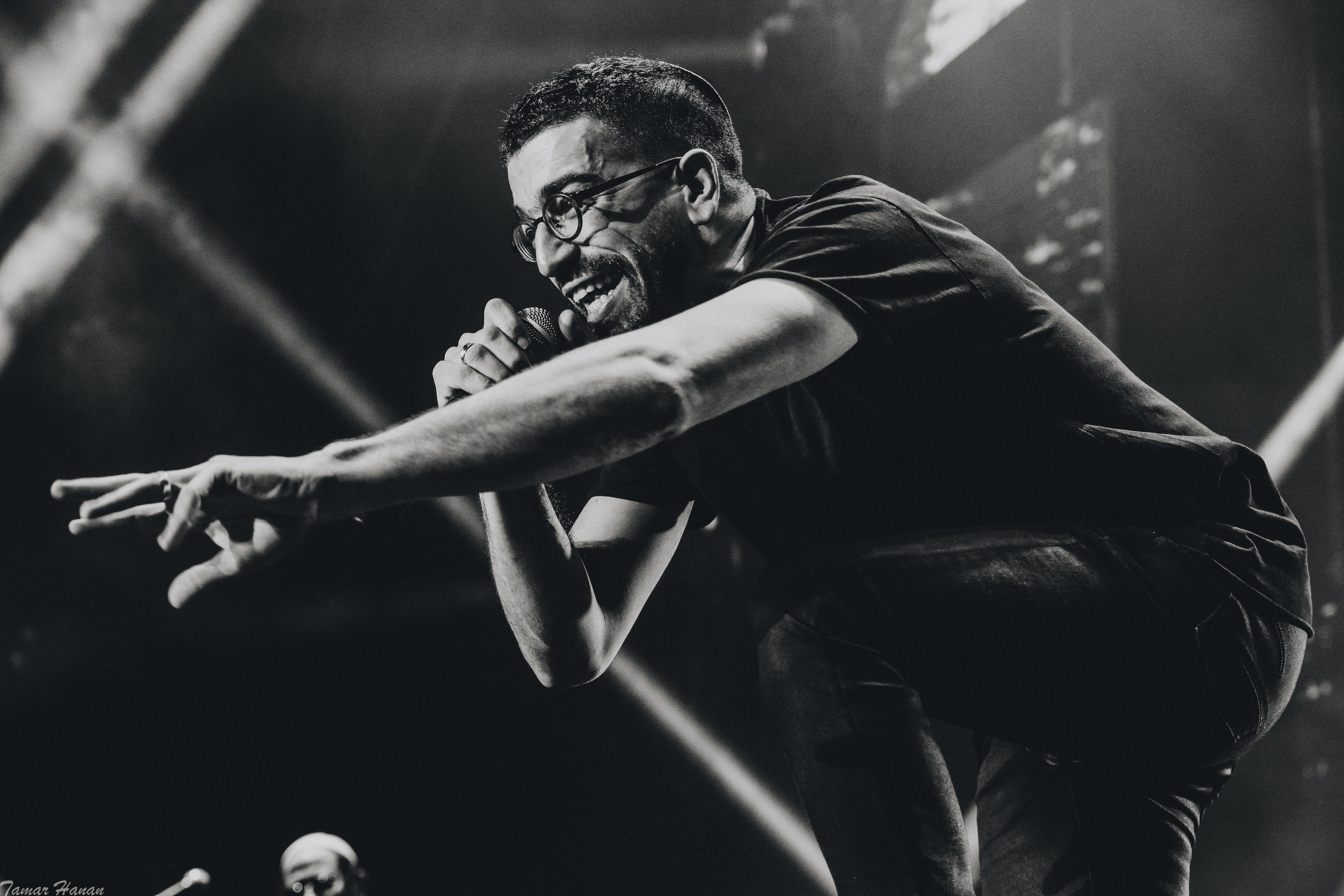
- Ben-Ari at Menora Mivtachim Arena in 2021.

Background information
- Born: April 8, 1988 (age 38); Karnei Shomron, West Bank,
- Genres: Jewish rock; pop; R&B; hip hop; funk; soul
- Occupations: Singer; songwriter; composer
- Instruments: Vocals, guitar, keyboard
- Years active: 2014–present
- Labels: NMC Music, D-Music
- Formerly of: HaKolot
- Spouse: Hadassah Ben-Ari (m. 2008, divorced August 2024)
- Website: hananbenari.com

Hanan Ben Ari (Hebrew: חנן בן ארי; born 8 April 1988) is an Israeli singer, songwriter, and composer. His debut album, Izun (Balance), released 21 February 2016, was certified gold in Israel with 15,000 copies sold in three months and received heavy radio play on Galgalatz. He has been noted as one of relatively few religious artists, including Ishay Ribo and Nathan Goshen, who have found success in the secular Israeli mainstream.

== Early life ==
Ben Ari grew up in Karnei Shomron, the fifth of six siblings; his father works in the financial sector of Bat Yam, while his mother works in special education. He is the nephew of former MK and Otzma Yehudit co-founder Michael Ben-Ari. Hanan sang in choirs from the age of six, learned keyboard from age 12, and began composing music at age 13. His father sang Iraqi, Egyptian, and Syrian music when he was growing up, and he was first exposed to hip hop around age 15. One of his older brothers, Neria, later left Orthodox Judaism.

After graduating high school at 17 via matriculation, Ben-Ari attended a hesder yeshiva in Mitzpe Ramon. He also spent time in Gush Katif's Neve Dekalim and witnessed the Israeli disengagement from Gaza, which later inspired his single "Mother". Ben-Ari served in the IDF's Netzah Yehuda Battalion for a year and eight months.

== Career ==
=== Beginnings and Izun (2014–2016) ===
Prior to a full-time music career, Ben-Ari taught at an alternative high school in Petah Tikva, wrote and edited the religious youth magazine Olam Ketan with his wife, and sang in a Jewish wedding band, Hakolot. In 2013, he collaborated with musicians Yaakov Asraf and Nir Rubin on an educational stage musical called Mitbagrim ("Growing Up"), which ran for over 100 performances. A performance of Hakolot's song "Vatikh Miriam", composed by Ben Ari, won third place in a national Israeli dance music contest in 2014.

Ben-Ari's debut single, Mimecha Ad Elay ("From You to Myself"), was announced by his uncle in November 2014. The song, whose lyrics reference Song of Songs and other Jewish scripture, was added to the Galgalatz daily playlist, where it reached fourth place in the station's weekly ranking and 34th in the station's year-end ranking. Several of his subsequent singles were also placed in heavy rotation on Galgalatz, as well as receiving over a million views each on YouTube. Another single, Hachaim Shelanu Tutim (Our Lives are Strawberries), reached No. 1 on Media Forest's weekly chart and was parodied on the Israeli TV sketch show Eretz Nehederet.

Ben-Ari's debut album, Izun (Balance), was crowdfunded via the website Headstart, where it raised over ₪100,000. The album was produced by Eyal Mazig. One of the album's tracks, Achim (Brothers), was a duet with Ivri Lider. The album was released on 21 February 2016 via NMC Music, receiving positive reviews and being certified gold in Israel with 15,000 copies sold in three months.

The following month, Ben-Ari played dates in Tel Aviv, Jerusalem, and Herzliya. During the summer, he toured nationally in Israel and performed at Festival HaTamar alongside Shlomi Shaban, Peter Roth, Maor Cohen, Margol, Riki Gal, and Guy & Yahel.

=== Lo Levad (2016–present) ===
Ahead of the release of his second album, Ben Ari released the singles: "Not Alone", "Thanks to you", "On my bed" featuring Moshe Peretz, and "Wikipedia", the lyrics of which he wrote with Keren Peles. The theme of the song "Wikipedia" is that we must not reduce people or groups to stereotypes or their descriptions in Wikipedia but rather see them as individuals. The song "Wikipedia" reached the second place in the annual parade of Galglatz for the Hebrew year 5777 and the third place in the annual parade of the Network 3 in the same year.

To coincide with Yom Ha'Atzmaut in 2016, Ben-Ari released the song Nigun HaNeshamot (Melody of the Souls). He had originally written the song during the 2006 Lebanon War, and later revisited it during the conflict in Bint Jbeil.

He then won ACUM song of the year award in 2017. In December he released the single "What do you want from me", and in March 2018 he released the song "Good News". In April, he released his second album, "Not Alone".

With Maccabi Tel Aviv's victory in the 2018–19 Israeli Premier League, Ben Ari performed the championship song "Yellow rises", as a renewal of the song sung by Ethnix in the 1995–96 Liga Leumit.

In February 2019, he released the single "Aluf ha'olam", composed by Ben Ari in collaboration with Nathan Goshen. In May 2019, he released a single called "Generation", which deals with the intergenerational gap on issues such as faith and preserving tradition. The song provoked mixed reactions in the religious sector and beyond.

In February 2020, he released the music video "If you want". The song came in second place in the annual Hebrew hymn parade of Galgalatz and Ynet and in the mako parade for the Hebrew year of 5780. In these parades he was also chosen as man of the year, along with winning the title of "Singer of the Year" by Tel Aviv Radio. In April, Ben-Ari released the single Ga’aguim Lebnei Adam (Longing for People), inspired by the COVID-19 pandemic. and was written together with Rabbi Lior Engelman. He also joined with Kav Lachayim, a child disability and rare illness organization, and with fellow Israeli artists Akiva, Ariel Zilber, Berry Sakharof, Amir Benayoun, and Lior Elmaliah for a rendition of the Sephardic liturgical poem "Refa Tziri". In November, Ben-Ari released the music video "Amen for the children", which went straight to the first place in the Media Forest weekly chart. The song reached the ninth place in the annual parade of Galgalatz in the Hebrew year 5781. For the video, Ben-Ari had posted to Facebook asking fans to send in clips of parents bonding with their children.

In May 2021 he released the single "Dreaming like Yosef" which he wrote together with his brother Neria. The following month he performed on 4 consecutive days at the Caesarea Maritima theater.

Because of the Coronavirus outbreak of 2019, no Akum Award was awarded in 2020. In 2021, Ben Ari retroactively won the Akum Award for "Artist of the Year" and most played song of 2020 for "If You Want".

On September 6, 2021, Ben-Ari won "Singer of the Year" in the annual Kan Gimel song parade. On December 6, 2021, Ben Ari released a music video for his single "Makom".

On March 28, 2022, he was supposed to release the rhythmic song "Ela Bi" but since the shooting attack in Hadera took place the day before, he chose to postpone its release and instead released the song "Besof ze halachan". About nine months later, on December 12, 2022, he released the song "Ela Bi". The music video for "Ela Bi" was controversial among religious audiences, as it showed men and women dancing together. In June, the musical "Champion of the World" premiered at the Orna Porat Children's Theater, which included Ben-Ari's songs. That same month, he released the music video single "Hanania" (from a live performance) that talks about his grandfather, after whom he is named. On July 14, he performed at the opening ceremony of the 2022 Maccabiah Games in the presence of Israeli president Isaac Herzog, Israeli Prime Minister Yair Lapid and United States President Joe Biden. On September 9, 2022 he released a live album titled Live 2022.

In April 2023, The New York Times listed Ben-Ari as part of a wave of religious singers gaining mainstream popularity in Israel, alongside Ishay Ribo, Nathan Goshen, Akiva Turgeman, and Narkis Reuven-Nagar. The following month, it was announced that Ben-Ari would lead an advertising campaign for El Al Airlines.

In 2025, Ben-Ari released a new song called "Hashivenu" which means "Bring us back". The lyrics are from the final verse of the Biblical book of Lamentations. The words in translation from the Hebrew are "Return us to you, Oh Lord and we shall return; renew our days as of old." Ben-Ari stated that the song was released against the backdrop of the release of several hostages freed from two years of captivity in Gaza after October 7, 2023. On January 15, 2026, he released his fourth album titled "Not The Only Crazy One". The song "Hashivenu" was included in this album after its tremendous popularity over the course of the previous year.

== Artistry ==
Ben-Ari's music draws from rock, soul, R&B, gospel, hip hop, and Arabic and Mizrahi music. His sound has drawn comparison to Alicia Keys, while Ben-Ari himself has cited Irish musician Hozier as an influence and expressed admiration for Israeli singer Karolina.

== Personal life ==
Ben-Ari was married to Hadassah, an editor, content producer, and poet who co-wrote a song with him. The couple met when Hanan was 20 and on leave from the army, through a mutual friend, and married shortly after. They initially lived in Bnei Brak, near Ponevezh Yeshiva, then lived in Ramat Gan and Or Yehuda, before settling in Pardes Hanna-Karkur as of 2020. They have seven children. Ben-Ari's paternal uncle is Michael Ben-Ari, former member of Knesset who has been disqualified from re-running for election due to incitement to racism.

Hanan and his wife separated in August 2024 and divorced in December 2024.

== Politics ==
Ben-Ari has been vocal about his view that the Israeli settlements in the Gaza Strip should be reestablished. In a video posted on TikTok on October 25, 2023, he can be seen singing to soldiers and proclaiming: "Returning to Gush Katif, Playing beach volleyball, Establishing Nova Beach on the Gaza coast, The nation of Israel lives!".

== Discography ==
=== Studio albums ===
Title	English translation	Details
Izun	Balance	Released: 21 February 2016; Label: NMC Music
Lo Levad	Not Alone	Released: May 17, 2018; Label: D-Music
Yesh Kan Yoter Mizeh	There's More Here Than This	Released: 2023
Lo HaMeshugah HaYechidi	Not The Only Crazy One	Released: January 15, 2026

=== Live albums ===
- Live 2022 (2022)
- The Hindu Show (2024)

=== Singles ===
Year	Title	English translation	Album
2014	Mimecha Ad Elay	From You to Myself	Izun
2015	Izun	Balance	Izun
2015	Ima Im Hayiti	Mother	Izun
2016	Hachaim Shelanu Tutim	Our Lives are Strawberries	Izun
2016	Lama Lanu Lirdof	Why Do We Chase?	Izun
2016	Lo Levad	Not Alone	Lo Levad
2017	Toda She'at	Thank You for Being	Lo Levad
2017	Vikipedia	Wikipedia	Lo Levad
2017	Sod HaMazlot	Secret of the Signs	Non-album single
2017	Ma Atah Rotzeh Mimeni	What Do You Want From Me?	Lo Levad
2018	Bshorot Tovot	Good News	Lo Levad
2018	Laila Tov Shon	Good Night Shon	Non-album single
2019	Aluf HaOlam	World Champion	Non-album single
2019	Dor	Generation	Non-album single
2019	Shemesh	Sun	Non-album single
2020	Im Tirtzi	If You Want	Non-album single
2020	Ga’aguim Lebnei Adam	Longing for People	Non-album single
2020	Shaburei Lev	Broken Hearted	Non-album single
2021	Amen Al HaYeladim	Amen to the Children	Non-album single
2021	Cholem Kmo Yosef	Dreaming Like Joseph	Non-album single
2021	Makom	Place	Non-album single
2022	B'Sof Zeh HaLachan	In the End, It's the Melody	Non-album single
2022	Hananiah	Hananiah	Non-album single
2022	Ela Bi	But In Me	Non-album single
2023	Atelef Iver	Blind Bat	Non-album single
2023	Hutz' Mikaduregel	Besides Soccer	Non-album single
2025	Hashivenu	Return us (was added to 2026 album)	Non-album single
2025	Achi	Brother	Non-album single

=== Music videos ===
Year	Title	Director
2016	"Nigun HaNeshama"	Yaakov Asraf
2016	"Lo Levad"	Yael Taub
2017	"Todah She'at	Yaakov Asraf & Sulam Yaakov
2017	"Wikipedia"	Tomer Gerbi & Yaniv Schmelzer
2017	"Sod HaMazlot"	Hanan Ben-Ari
2017	"Ma Atah Rotzeh Mimeni"	Or Barnea
2018	"Laila Tov Shon"	Yaakov Asraf & Hanan Ben-Ari
2019	"Aluf HaOlam"	Eitan Cohen & Alon Seifert
2020	"Im Tirtzi"	Yaakov Asraf
2020	"Ga'aguim Lebnei Adam"	Nadav Tzupi
2020	"Shaburei Lev"	Yaakov Asraf
2020	"Amen Al HaYeladim"	Eitan Cohen
2021	"Cholem Kmo Yosef"	Eitan Cohen & Alon Seifert
2021	"Makom"	Hai Afik
2022	"Hananiah"	Yaakov Asraf
2022	"Ela Bi"	Eitan Cohen, Tomer Biran, Alon Seifert
2023	"Hutz' Mikaduregel"	Omri rosi

== See also ==
- Music of Israel
- List of Israeli musical artists
