= The Other Story =

The Other Story may refer to:

- The Other Story (film)
- The Other Story (exhibition)
