= Lior Engelman =

Israeli rabbi (born 1972)

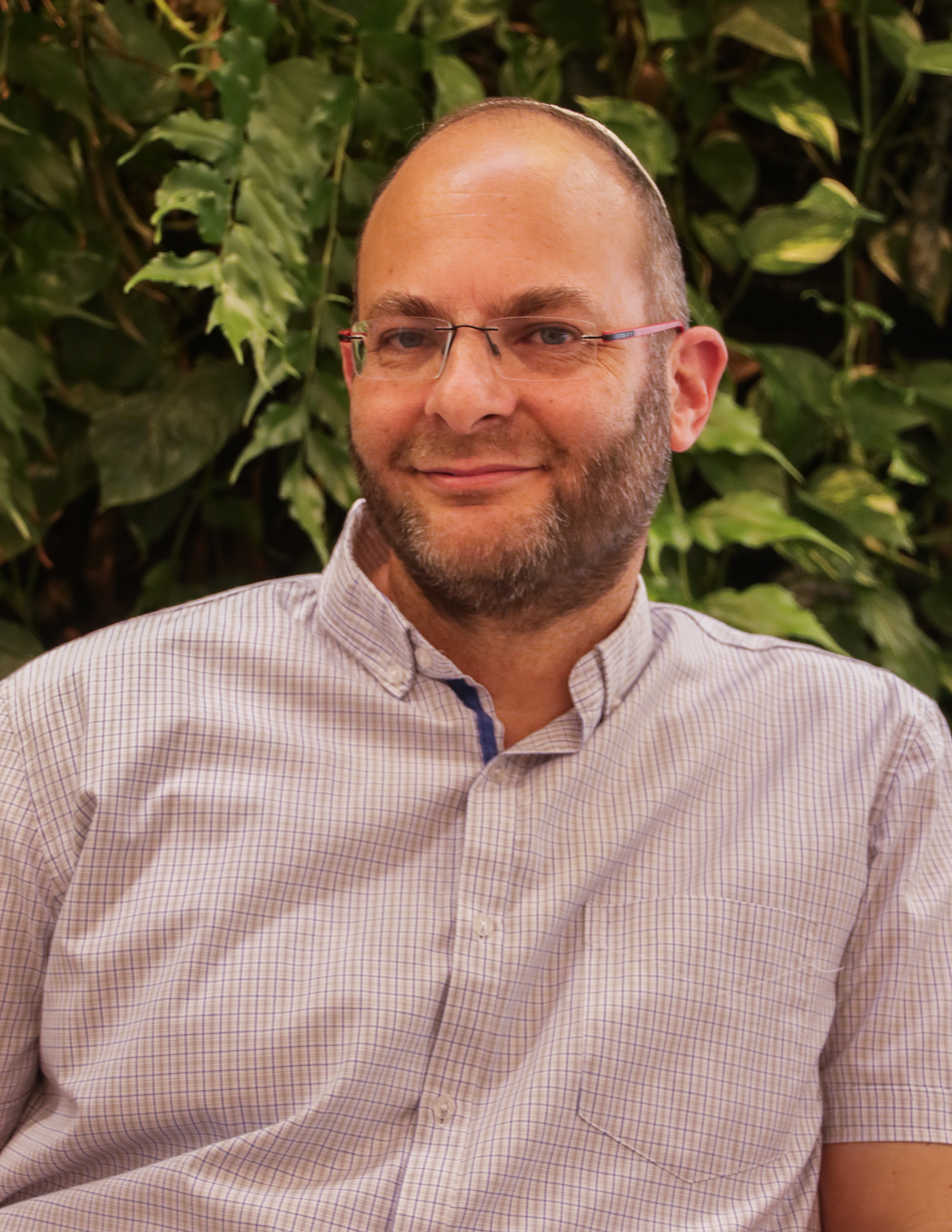
Rabbi Lior Engelman

Rabbi Lior Haim Engelman (Hebrew: ליאור חיים אנגלמן; born July 30, 1972) is a Religious Zionist rabbi and Israeli author. He is the head of the community yeshiva in Kfar Saba. Between 2015 and 2019, he served as the head of the yeshiva in the Binot Ra'anana seminary.

== Biography ==
He was born in Kfar Saba to Avraham and Tzipora Engelman. He studied in high school at the Bnei Akiva yeshiva in Netanya and later moved to yeshivat Kfar Haroeh. He studied at the Shavei Hevron yeshiva and the Hesder Yeshiva in Kiryat Shmona. In the IDF, he served in the Armored Corps. After the army, he studied for 6 years at the Bnei David Institute in Psagot and was ordained as a dayan (rabbinical judge).

He served as the rabbi of the Torah nucleus in Givat Ze'ev and as head of the yeshiva at Ateret Yerushalayim. He teaches in Machon Meir, in the community yeshiva in Kfar Saba, and at the Binot Ra'anana seminary.

In 2000, his story "Uri zafon U'voi teyman" won the short story competition of Makor Rishon. He published Torah articles in the "With Love and Faith" newsletter, where he combined stories, as well as in other Shabbat newsletters and more.

In 2006, following the implementation of the "disengagement plan", he published the book "Kisufim" (Longings), which includes chapters on religious coping following the evacuation of settlements from Gush Katif.

In 2010, he published the book "Shkufim," which includes a collection of short stories, focusing largely on the lives of people facing daily challenges. He then studied at the "Home Workshops" writing school and started teaching writing workshops there in 2014.

In 2014, he released the novel "Do Not Stop Love in the Middle," which won the Gold Book Award and was selected for the Ministry of Education's book parade. In 2018, he released the novel "Bound by His Soul" and it was also selected for the Ministry of Education's book parade. In 2020, After the death of his mother Tzipi (Tzipora) he published the book "Additional Soul" on the essence and mystery of Shabbat.

In 2020, he wrote the song "Longing for People" with Hanan Ben Ari, following the outbreak of the coronavirus in Israel.

Since 2021, he has been a regular columnist in the newspaper B'Sheva for the Religious Zionist sector.

== Personal life ==
Engelman is married and a father of five, living in Kfar Saba. After several years in Givat Ze'ev, he returned to his hometown and established the community yeshiva there with his brother-in-law, Rabbi Moti Desha.
