= Cuckoo (Netta song) =

Single by Netta

from the EP Goody Bag
- Released: 16 May 2020
- Length: 3:13
- Label: Tedy Productions; BMG
- Songwriter(s): Bert Elliott; Krysta Marie Youngs; Netta Barzilai
- Producer(s): Bert Elliott; J. R. Rotem

Netta singles chronology
"Ricki Lake" (2020)	"Cuckoo" (2020)	"The Times They Are a-Changin'" (2020)

"Cuckoo" is a song performed by Israeli singer Netta. The song was released as a digital download on 16 May 2020 as the fifth and final single from her debut extended play Goody Bag. It was written by Bert Elliott, Krysta Marie Youngs and Netta Barzilai, and produced by J. R. Rotem and Elliott.

== Background ==
In an interview, Netta explained the meaning behind the song, she said, "'Cuckoo' is personal because it also speaks about doubts in a romantic relationship." She also said that adding that for the last year and a half she's been in a relationship with Ilan Ben Or, a new immigrant from the US. "We've had some rough times because my life is not simple. I met Ilan after I became famous and wasn't sure whether he was sincere. Maybe because of my past, I always have doubts and this is echoed in 'Cuckoo' – do I really deserve to be loved?"

== Live performances ==
On 16 May 2020, Netta performed the song during Eurovision: Europe Shine a Light. It replaced the Eurovision Song Contest 2020, which was planned to be held in Rotterdam, Netherlands, but was cancelled due to the COVID-19 pandemic.

== Music video ==
A music video to accompany the release of "Cuckoo" was first released onto YouTube on 12 June 2020. The video was directed by Roy Raz.

== Track listing ==
Digital download
No.	Title	Length
1.	"Cuckoo"	3:13

== Personnel ==
Credits adapted from Tidal.

- Bert Elliott – producer, composer
- J. R. Rotem – producer
- Krysta Marie Youngs – composer
- Netta Barzilai – composer, vocals
- Chris Gehringer – engineer
- Matt Schaeffer – engineer

== Charts ==
Chart (2020)	Peak position
Israel (Media Forest)	1

== Release history ==
Region	Date	Format	Label
Various	16 May 2020	Digital download	Tedy Productions
