= Talisman (singer) =

Israeli musical artist

Tal Ben Noon טל בן נון
- Born: May 30, 1991 (age 35); Los Angeles
- Genres: Rap, Hip Hop
- Occupation: Singer
- Years active: 2014-present

Tal Ben Noon (Hebrew: טל בן נון; born May 30, 1991), known by the stage name Talisman (previously also as Tellis), is an Israeli rapper, singer, and music producer.

== Early life, education and music career ==
Tal Ben Nun was born in Los Angeles to artist Mirit Ben Nun and immigrated to Israel with his family at the age of four and grew up in Moshav Beit Hanania.

In 2015 he released the songs "Ad Hamdbar" (with DJ Onli and Omari Sabah), in 2016 "Where the Wind Takes" and in 2017 "Zanzibar" composed by Stav Beger. In 2017, he also released "Shlok Makatsav", a duet with Maor Adri. Ben Nun was chosen in 2017 as Breakthrough of the Year at the Galgalatz y Walla site's annual song parade.

In February 2018, together with singer Pe'er Tasi, he released a song called "Machhishimim" which became a big hit and topped the playlists.

In June 2019, together with Johnny Goldstein, he wrote the song "I am not me" for Yonatan Margi.

In 2020, at the height of the coronavirus crisis, he participated in the song "Katan Aleinu" ("We Got This" or literally: "It's small for us"), which brought together 40 singers and rappers from Israel to sing a song of strength and unity against COVID-19.

In February 2020, he released the third single from his new album, "Broken House." In May 2020, together with singer Harel Sekat, he released the song "Wants to come back", the song was very successful, reaching 7th place on the weekly Media Forest chart. In 2022, together with Raviv Kaner, they released a song "At the Point Where the Light Ends".

On November 30, 2022, he changed his stage name to "Talis" and released an album with this name, in which he speaks more personally about his life, his childhood, his parents and the area where he grew up. He collaborated on the album with artists Sheruf, Eitan Darmon and ZK. After a year, he returned his stage name to.

== Personal life ==
Talisman was in a relationship with singer Shira Margalit for approximately two and a half years. On October 29, 2018, the song "Comes and Goes" which she wrote and composed with Margalit herself was uploaded to Shira Margalit's YouTube channel. In December 2019, they separated and then he released the song "Broken House" which talks about their relationship.

== Discography ==
=== Album ===
- 2022: טליס

== See also ==
- Ofer Levi
