= Beg (song) =

Single by Omer Adam and Netta

from the album Omer
- Language: Hebrew; English
- Released: 26 December 2019
- Recorded: 2019
- Genre: Pop; reggaeton
- Length: 2:55
- Label: NMC United
- Songwriters: Omer Adam; Netta Barzilai; Doron Medalie; Avi Ohayon; Avshalom Ariel
- Producers: Yinon Yahel; Avshalom Ariel

Omer Adam singles chronology
"Yesh Lanu Et HaKoach" (2019)	"Beg" (2019)	"Maim Shkufim" (2020)

Netta singles chronology
"Yesh Lanu Et HaKoach" (2019)	"Beg" (2019)	"Ricki Lake" (2020)

"Beg" (stylized in all caps) is a song performed by Israeli singers Omer Adam and Netta. The song was released as a digital download on 26 December 2019 as the thirteenth single from Omer Adam's sixth studio album Omer.

== Track listing ==
Digital download
No.	Title	Length
1.	"Beg"	2:55

== Charts ==
Chart (2019)	Peak position
Israel (Media Forest)	1

== Release history ==
Region	Date	Format	Label
Various	26 December 2019	Digital download	NMC United
