= Nana Banana =

Single by Netta

from the EP Goody Bag
- Released: 10 May 2019
- Length: 3:04
- Label: Tedy Productions; BMG
- Songwriter(s): Nathan Goshen; Stav Beger; Netta Barzilai
- Producer(s): Stav Beger

Netta singles chronology
"Bassa Sababa" (2019)	"Nana Banana" (2019)	"Yesh Lanu Et HaKoach" (2019)

"Nana Banana" is a song performed by Israeli singer Netta. The song was released as a digital download on 10 May 2019 as the third single from her debut extended play Goody Bag. The song was written by Nathan Goshen, Stav Beger and Netta Barzilai.

== Live performances ==
Netta performed the song live on 18 May 2019 at the Eurovision Song Contest 2019 as one of the interval acts which took place at the Expo Tel Aviv in Tel Aviv, Israel.

== Track listing ==
Digital download
No.	Title	Length
1.	"Nana Banana"	3:04

Digital download
No.	Title	Length
1.	"Nana Banana" (Thomas Gold Remix)	2:48
2.	"Nana Banana" (Dalit Rechester & Yinon Yahel Remix)	4:52
3.	"Nana Banana" (Dego & Pangea Remix)	5:03

== Personnel ==
Credits adapted from Tidal.

- Stav Beger – producer, composer, background vocals, engineer, keyboards, programmer
- Nathan Goshen – composer, background vocals
- Netta Barzilai – composer, background vocals, vocals
- Liron Carakukly – background vocals
- Eyal Sela – flute

== Charts ==
Chart (2019)	Peak position
Russia (Tophit)	12

== Release history ==
Region	Date	Format	Label
Various	10 May 2019	Digital download	Tedy Productions
