= Bassa Sababa =

2019 single by Israeli singer Netta

Single by Netta

from the EP Goody Bag
- Released: 1 February 2019
- Studio: Stav Beger; Bardo
- Genre: Dance-pop; EDM; Mizrahi; electropop
- Length: 2:58
- Label: Tedy Productions; Unicell; BMG Rights Management (US); S-Curve
- Songwriters: Netta Barzilai; Stav Beger; Avshalom Ariel
- Producer: Stav Beger

Netta singles chronology
"Toy" (2018)	"Bassa Sababa" (2019)	"Nana Banana" (2019)

Music video
- "Bassa Sababa" on YouTube

"Bassa Sababa" (Hebrew transliteration: באסה סבבה) is a song recorded by Israeli singer Netta, and is the follow-up from her Eurovision Song Contest 2018-winning single "Toy". The track was written and produced by Netta, Avshalom Ariel and Stav Beger. The song was released on 1 February 2019 along with its official music video clip. Bassa is used in Hebrew slang for the word ‘bummer’, but can relate to the context of the song as “Bass” rooted. The song means “Fun Central” or “Source of Fun.” As of July 2025, the official music video for "Bassa Sababa" has over 356,000,000 views on YouTube.

The song is featured in the 2019 dance rhythm video game Just Dance 2020.

== Background ==
In an interview with Israeli magazine “At”, Netta revealed that the sound of the animal in the song links back to her childhood and growing up in Nigeria. When Barzilai was around 6 years old, her family moved to Nigeria for her father's job. During her time there she fell in love with rhinos and featured their sound in the song, following the chicken sounds in “Toy.”

== Track listing ==
Digital download
No.	Title	Length
1.	"Bassa Sababa"	2:58

Digital EP – Global Remixes
No.	Title	Length
1.	"Bassa Sababa" (Dalit Rechester Remix)	4:09
2.	"Bassa Sababa" (Mike Cruz Remix)	7:45
3.	"Bassa Sababa" (Mike Cruz Radio Remix)	3:37
4.	"Bassa Sababa" (Gromee Remix)	4:07
5.	"Bassa Sababa" (Riddler Remix)	4:58
6.	"Bassa Sababa" (Wild Culture Remix)	4:09
7.	"Bassa Sababa"	2:58

== Credits and personnel ==
Recording and management

- Recorded at Stav Beger and Bardo Studios (Tel Aviv)
- Published by Tedy Productions and Unicell

Personnel

- Netta – vocals, production
- Stav Beger – composition, production, percussion, keyboards, additional vocals, mixing and mastering
- Avshalom Ariel – composition, production, percussion, additional vocals
- Ronen Hilel – master and mixing engineer
- Shimon Yihye – guitars

== Charts ==
=== Weekly charts ===
Chart (2019)	Peak position
Israel (Media Forest)	1
Israel (Media Forest TV Airplay)	1
Poland Airplay (ZPAV) Gromee remix version	23
US Dance Club Songs (Billboard)	3
US Hot Dance/Electronic Songs (Billboard)	28
