= Ricki Lake (song) =

Single by Netta

from the EP Goody Bag
- Released: 4 February 2020
- Length: 2:10
- Label: Tedy Productions; BMG
- Songwriters: Nikki Flores; Chaz Jackson; Dashawn “Happie” White; Emily Vaughn; Netta Barzilai
- Producers: Avshalom Ariel; Tha Aristocrats

Netta singles chronology
"BEG" (2019)	"Ricki Lake" (2020)	"Cuckoo" (2020)

"Ricki Lake" is a song performed by Israeli singer Netta. The song was released as a digital download on 4 February 2020 as the fourth single from her debut extended play Goody Bag. The song was written by Brandi Nicole Flores, Chaz Jackson, Dashawn “Happie” White, Emily Vaughn and Netta Barzilai.

== Background ==
The song references the American actress, who is best known for playing Tracy Turnblad in the 1988 film Hairspray.

== Music video ==
A music video to accompany the release of "Ricki Lake" was first released onto YouTube on 6 February 2020. The video was directed by Roy Raz.

== Track listing ==
Digital download
No.	Title	Length
1.	"Ricki Lake"	3:04

Digital download
No.	Title	Length
1.	"Ricki Lake" (Filatov & Karas Remix)	2:24
2.	"Ricki Lake" (Joe Maz Remix)	2:29
3.	"Ricki Lake" (BQ Remix)	2:18

== Personnel ==
Credits adapted from Tidal.

- Avshalom Ariel – producer
- Tha Aristocrats – producer, engineer
- Brandi Nicole Flores – composer
- Chaz Jackson – composer
- Deshawn Quincy White – composer
- Emily Vaughn – composer
- Netta Barzilai – composer
- Chris Gehringer – engineer

== Charts ==
Chart (2020)	Peak position
Israel (Media Forest)	1

== Release history ==
Region	Date	Format	Label
Various	4 February 2020	Digital download	Tedy Productions
