= Stav Beger =

Israeli musical artist

Stav Beger סתיו בגר
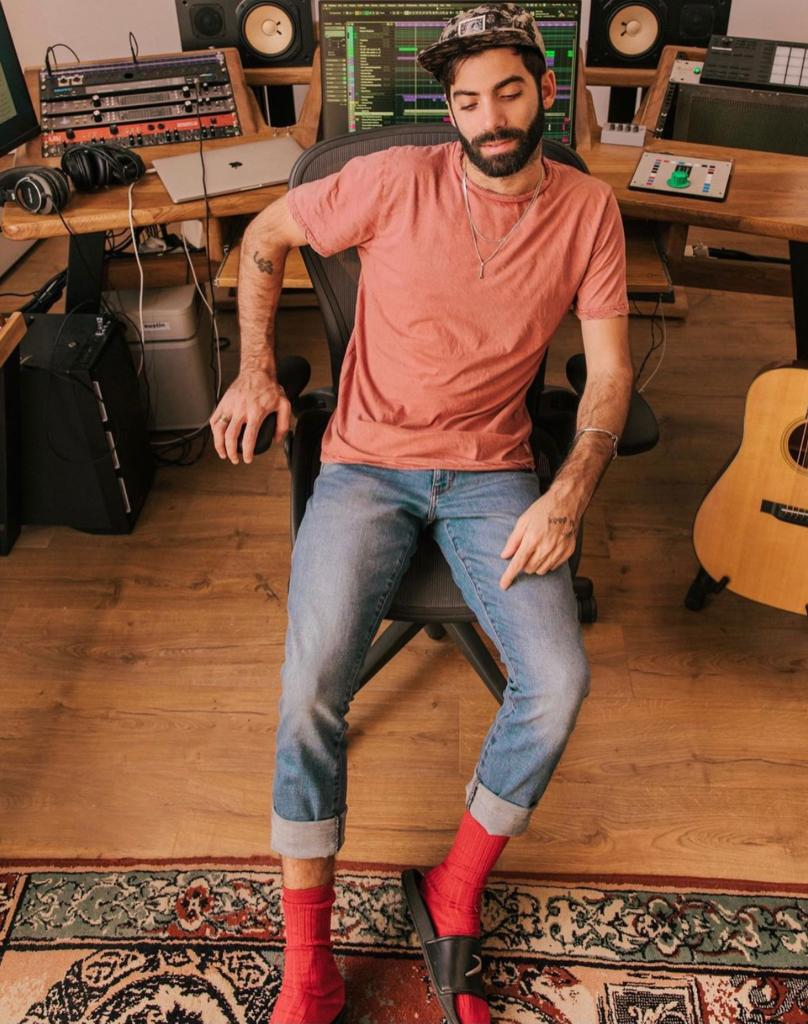

Background information
- Born: 21 October 1991 (age 35); Dor, Israel
- Genre: Pop
- Years active: 2015–present

Stav Beger (Hebrew: סתיו בגר; born 21 October 1991) is an Israeli record producer, arranger, composer, songwriter and artistic director.

== Career ==
At his career's beginning, Beger worked as recording engineer for Israeli musician Yinon Yahel. In 2015 he helped him to produce Israel's Eurovision 2015 song "Golden Boy". Starting his independent career as a record producer and composer, Beger produced Israeli rapper Talisman's hit "Zanzibar" in 2016, which reached the top of Galgalatz's weekly chart.

In 2018, he wrote and produced Omer Adam's biggest hit "Shney Meshugaim", which reached the top of Media Forest's chart and got more than 7 million streams on Spotify, becoming the most-streamed Hebrew song on the platform. At the same year, Beger wrote and produce Israel's 2018 Eurovision-winning song by Netta Barzilai, "Toy", with Doron Medalie, winning Society of Authors, Composers and Music Publishers in Israel prizes for "extraordinary achievement in the international arena" and "arranger of the year".

In 2019, Beger co-wrote the songs "Bassa Sababa" and "Nana Banana" by Netta Barzilai. That year, he also produced "Katov Mi'lemala" by Idan Raichel, which reached the top of Media Forest's weekly chart.

In 2020, he wrote with Nathan Goshen the song "Roots" by Eden Alene, one of the four nominated songs to represent Israel in the Eurovision Song Contest 2020. The same year, he produced Goshen's sixth album, Bati Lachlom, which received much praise.

In 2023, Beger joined Yinon Yahel, Tal Forer, Amit Shine and Oudi Antebi to start Session42, an Israeli based music label and music tech company. Session42 is the management company and label behind Eden Golan.

He co-authored the 2024 song "Hurricane", which represented Israel in the Eurovision Song Contest 2024. The song got 5th place in the Grand Final. Also in 2024, he co-wrote and co-produced the song "Older" by Eden Golan.
