= Netta Barzilai =

Israeli singer (born 1993)

Netta Barzilai נטע ברזילי
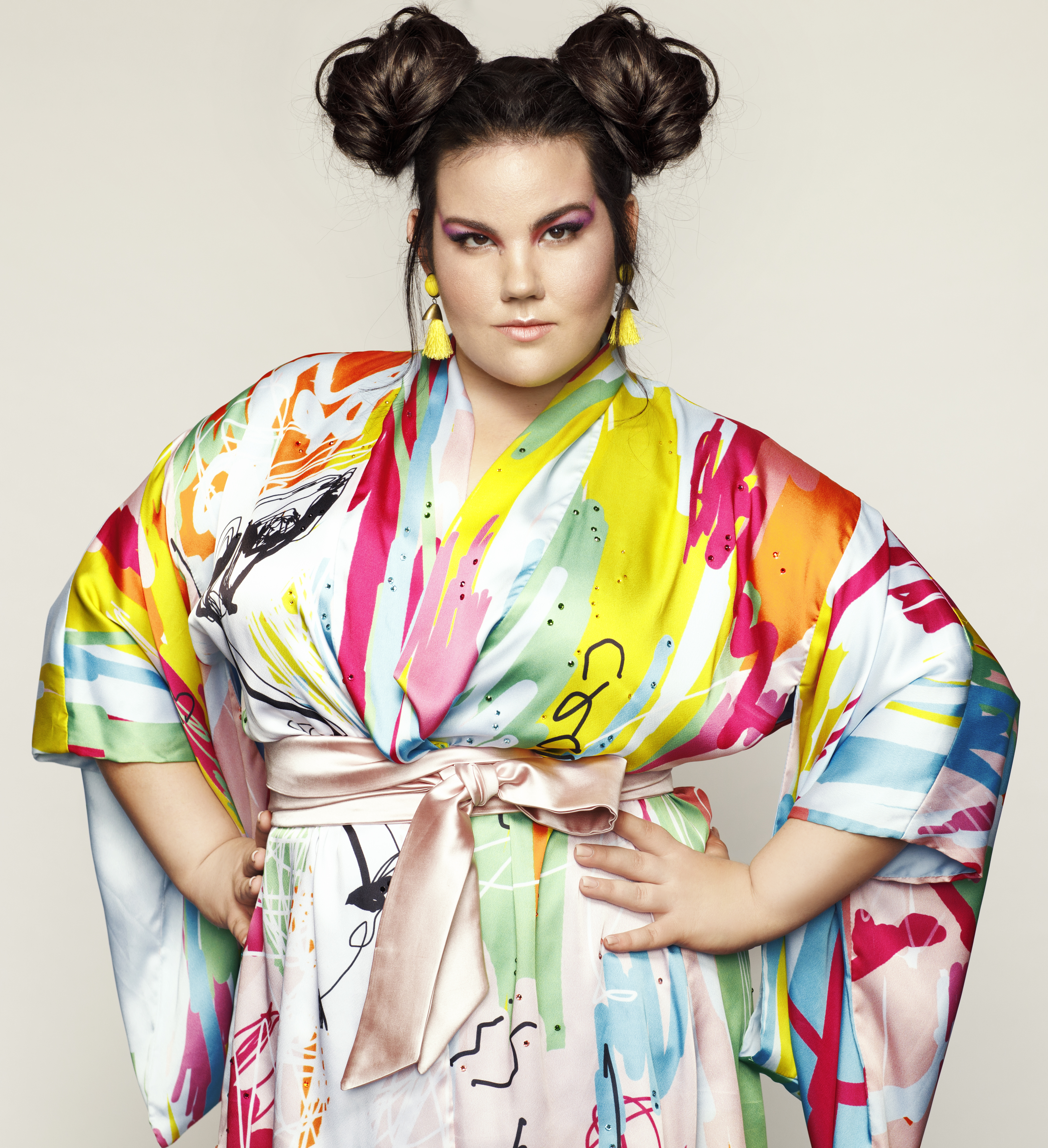
- Barzilai in 2018

Background information
- Also known as: Netta
- Born: 22 January 1993 (age 33); Hod HaSharon, Israel
- Genres: Pop; electropop; experimental pop; folk pop
- Occupation: Singer
- Instrument: Vocals
- Years active: 2012–present
- Labels: S-Curve; Tedy Productions; BMG
- Website: nettamusic.com

Netta Barzilai (Hebrew: נטע ברזילי [ˈneta baʁziˈlaj]; born 22 January 1993), also known mononymously as Netta, is an Israeli singer. After winning the fifth season of HaKokhav HaBa, she went on to represent her country at the Eurovision Song Contest 2018. On 12 May 2018, she won the contest, held in Lisbon, with her debut single "Toy", marking Israel's fourth win in the Eurovision Song Contest (after 1978, 1979, and 1998).

== Biography ==
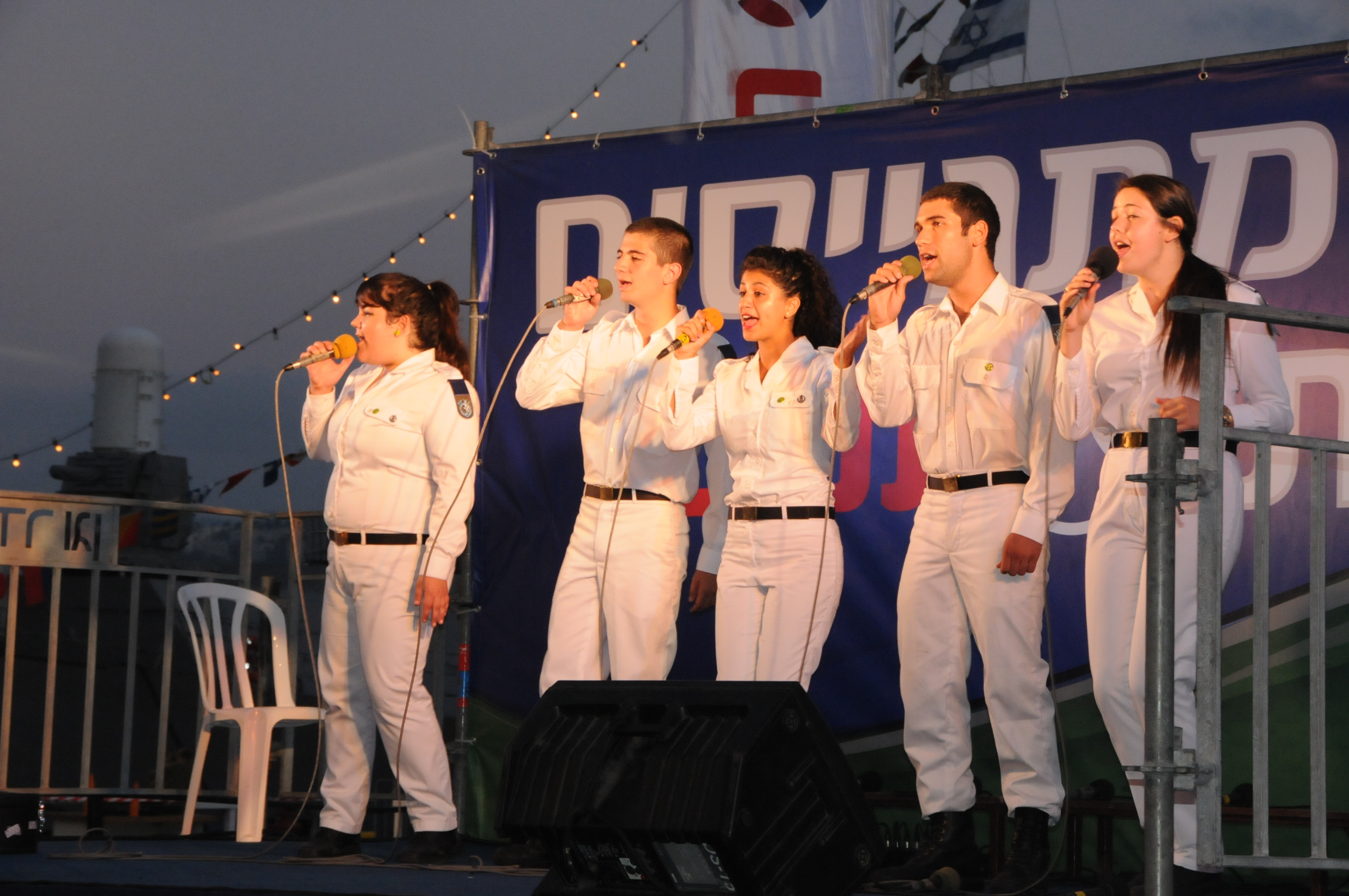
Barzilai (on the left) with fellow members of the Israeli Navy Band, 2013

Barzilai was born and raised in Hod HaSharon, Israel, to Israeli-born parents. Her mother's family is of both Sephardi Jewish and Mizrahi Jewish (Moroccan-Jewish and Libyan-Jewish) descent, whereas her father's family is of Ashkenazi Jewish (Polish-Jewish) descent. She has two brothers. As a child, Barzilai lived in Nigeria for six years, where her father, who is an engineer, worked on a project for Israeli company Solel Boneh.

Barzilai attended Hadarim High School in Hod HaSharon and was a youth leader in the Israeli HaNoar HaOved VeHaLomed youth movement. Prior to serving in the Israel Defense Forces (IDF), she spent a Pre-Army Service Year (Shnat Sherut; Shin-Shin) volunteering with youth as part of the Tarbut movement. She completed her mandatory military service in the Israeli Navy Band. Afterwards, she studied electronic music at the Rimon School of Jazz and Contemporary Music, however she did not complete a degree there.

Barzilai faced discrimination during her childhood in school in Israel after returning from Nigeria due to her appearance and has actively stood for the message of body positivity.

== Career ==
=== Eurovision Song Contest ===
In September 2017, Barzilai auditioned for season five of HaKokhav HaBa, Israel's national selection for the Eurovision Song Contest, with "Rude Boy" by Rihanna. After receiving 82% of the votes, she advanced to the second stage of the competition in which she sang "Hey Mama" by David Guetta. In February 2018, she performed "Wannabe" by the Spice Girls, and although she lost a duel to Ricky Ben Ari, she proceeded to the next stage after being selected by the judges.

The last song Barzilai performed in the competition was a mashup of "Gangnam Style" by Psy and "Tik Tok" by Kesha. After receiving 210 points from the judges and audience, Barzilai won first place and the right to represent Israel at Eurovision.

On 25 February 2018, it was reported that the song that Barzilai would perform at the contest would be called "Toy" and that it would be performed in English, apart from a phrase in Hebrew. The song was written and composed by Doron Medalie and Stav Beger, and produced by Berger.

The song was released on 11 March 2018, and its music video went on to receive more than 20 million views two months before the beginning of Eurovision. On 14 April 2018, Barzilai performed her song at Eurovision in Concert in Amsterdam, the largest Eurovision promotional event. Four days later, she performed the song Hora Heachzut at the torch-lighting ceremony that opened the 70th Israeli Independence Day.

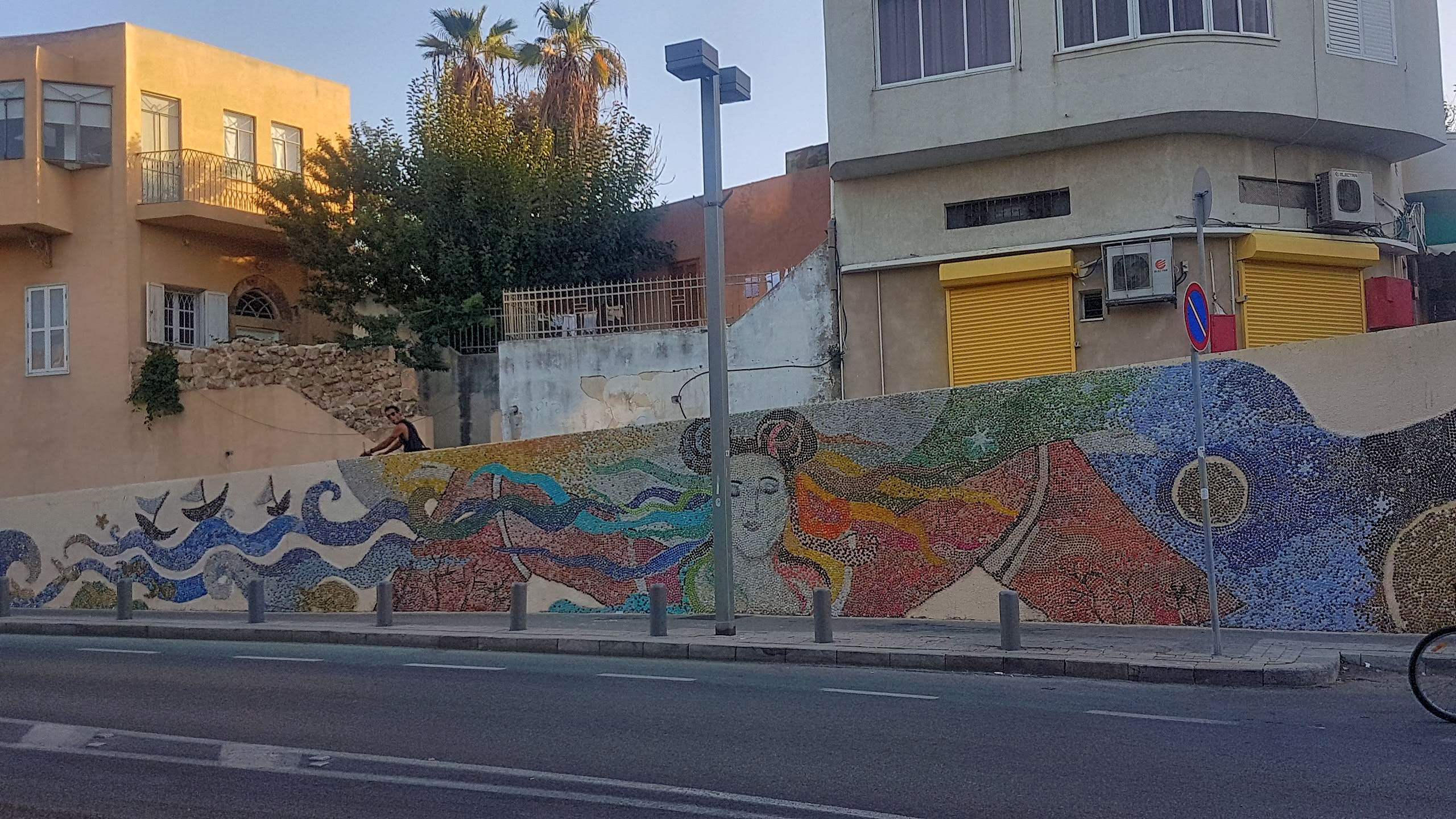
Netta Barzilai, in one of her Eurovision outfits, depicted in Tel Aviv street art

On 8 May 2018, Barzilai participated in the first semi-final of the Eurovision Song Contest, winning the semi-final with 283 points and qualifying for the final on 12 May. In the final, she placed first with televoters and third with international juries, amassing 529 points in total and winning the competition, marking Israel's fourth Eurovision win (after 1978, 1979, and 1998).

Shortly after winning Eurovision, Barzilai signed a worldwide record deal with New York-based label S-Curve Records. On 1 February 2019, Barzilai released her follow-up single "Bassa Sababa", alongside a music video filmed in Kyiv with Eddie Kabtner.

At the Eurovision Song Contest 2019 held in Tel Aviv, Barzilai opened the first semi-final with a new version of her winning song "Toy". During the grand final, she sang a new single, "Nana Banana".

=== Post-Eurovision ventures ===
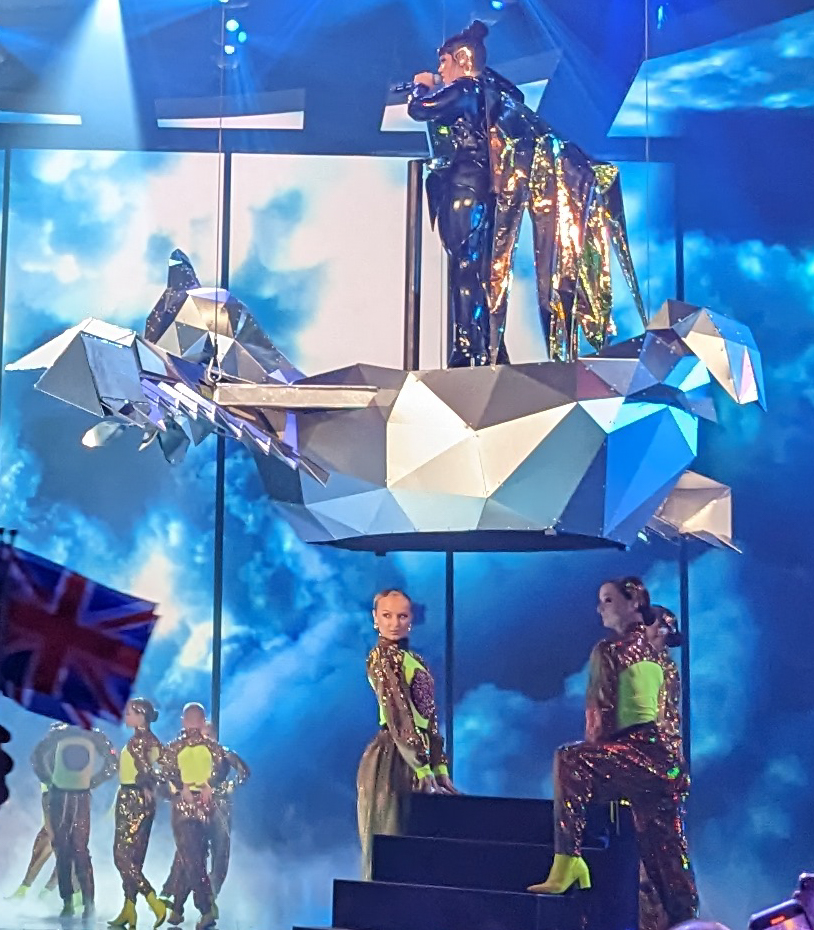
Barzilai performing in the final of the Eurovision Song Contest 2023 in Liverpool as part of an interval act

Barzilai began appearing worldwide between Pride parades across Europe and TV programs in the United States. The record was set on 19 October 2019, when she appeared at the Zhejiang Satellite TV Autumn Festival in China in front of approximately 500 million television viewers and tens of thousands in the audience.

At Hanukkah 2019, Barzilai began performing in the show "Pop Up Music 2" alongside Omer Adam, Keren Peles, Moshe Peretz and more. In November, they released the theme song of the show "We Got The Power" together with Adam, Moshe Peretz and Rotem Cohen who participated alongside her in the show. She later released a duet with Adam, titled "Beg".

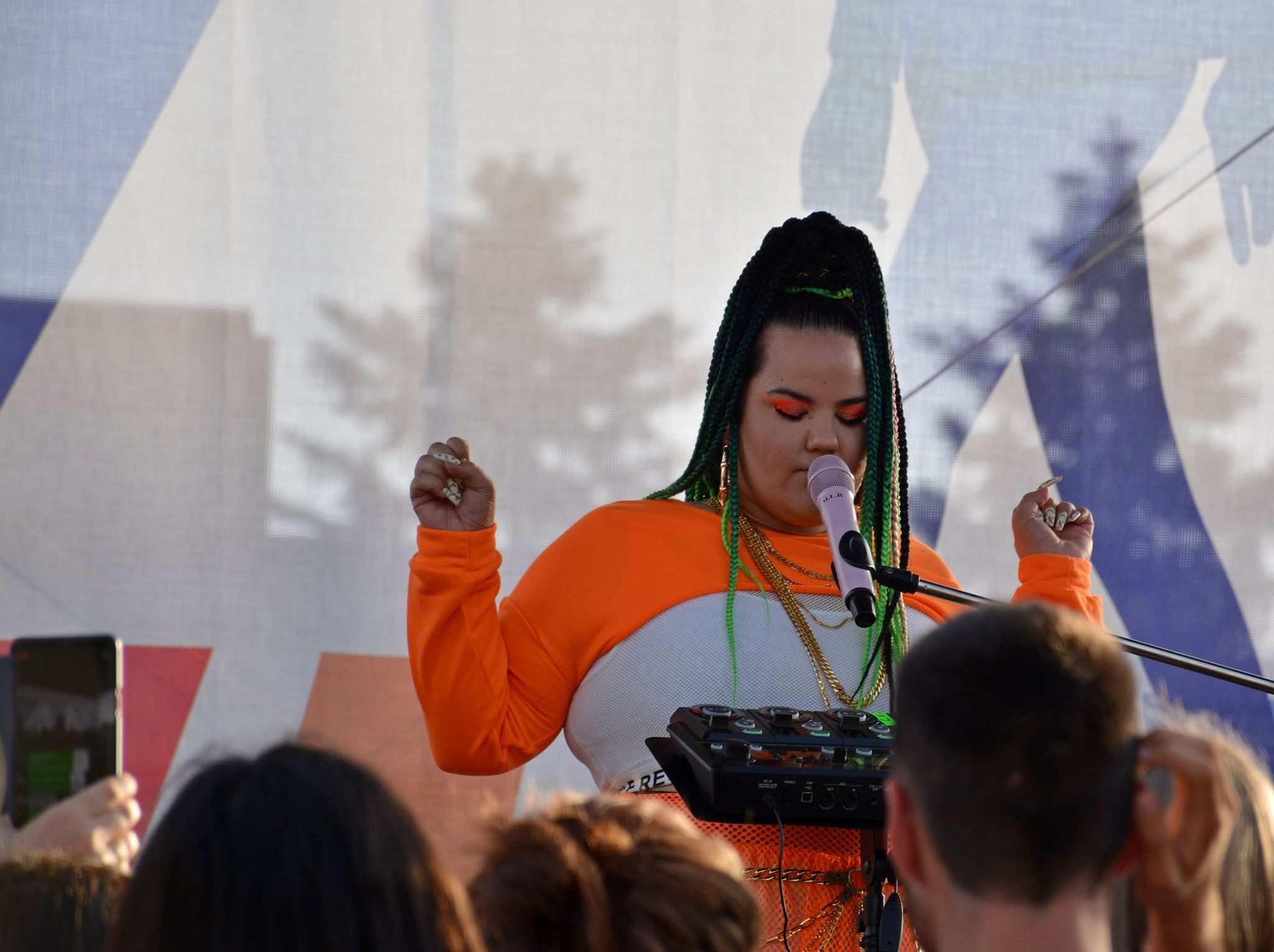
Netta performing at Sofia Pride in 2019

On 7 February 2020 she released a new song, titled "Ricki Lake". In addition, Barzilai debuted a new project titled Netta's Office, a series of YouTube videos in which she remixes songs using her trademark looper. In the same year she participated in the new version of the program "We Will Not Stop Singing" on Channel 12. Barzilai competed in the first episode alongside Keren Peles and Moshe Peretz and won the episode.

On 16 May 2020, she performed a new song, "Cuckoo", during the Eurovision: Europe Shine a Light special event. Her debut EP Goody Bag was released soon after on 25 June, containing all five singles she had released up until that point: "Toy", "Bassa Sababa", "Nana Banana", "Ricki Lake" and "Cuckoo". She later made a cameo in the Netflix film Eurovision Song Contest: The Story of Fire Saga. A second EP titled The Best of Netta's Office, Vol. 1 was released on 18 December, containing six of her remixes seen in the Netta's Office series. She served as a judge on the fourth season of The X Factor Israel, which determined the Israeli representative for the Eurovision Song Contest 2022.

On 13 October 2021, Barzilai released "CEO" and "Dum", her first new solo music in over a year. Further singles in 2022 included "I Love My Nails" and "Playground Politica" (with Nigerian singer Mr Eazi).

In 2024, Barzilai competed in the 10th season of Israel's Rokdim Im Kokhavim ('Dancing with the Stars'). She was eliminated 12th (out of 21 couples) in the first round of the live show stage.

In May 2024, she performed in a Tel Aviv rally demanding the release of hostages amid the Gaza war hostage crisis. Eden Golan, Noga Erez and Lola Marsh also performed.

On 1 July 2026, she performed a duet with Anna Zak at the opening ceremony of the 2026 Maccabiah Games.

== Discography ==
=== Extended plays ===
Title	EP details
Goody Bag	Released: 25 June 2020; Label: Tedy Productions; Format: Digital download
The Best of Netta's Office, Vol. 1	Released: 18 December 2020; Label: Tedy Productions; Format: Digital download
Saranda	Released: 26 April 2026; Label: D-Music; Format: Digital download

=== Singles ===
==== As lead artist ====
Title	Year	Peak chart positions										Album or EP
Title	Year	ISR	BEL (FL)	FRA	NLD	NOR	SPA	SWE	SWI	UK	US Dance	Album or EP
"Toy"	2018	1	29	16	60	19	16	5	34	49	1	Goody Bag
"Bassa Sababa"	2019	1	—	—	—	—	—	—	—	—	3	Goody Bag
"Ricki Lake"	2020	1	—	—	—	—	—	—	—	—	—	Goody Bag
"Cuckoo"	2020	1	—	—	—	—	—	—	—	—	—	Goody Bag
"The Times They Are a-Changin'"	2021	—	—	—	—	—	—	—	—	—	—	The Best of Netta's Office (Vol. 1)
"CEO"	2021	—	—	—	—	—	—	—	—	—	—	Non-album singles
"I Love My Nails"	2022	1	—	—	—	—	—	—	—	—	—	Non-album singles
"Playground Politica" (with Mr Eazi)	2022	1	—	—	—	—	—	—	—	—	—	Non-album singles
"You Spin Me Round (Like a Record)"	2023	—	—	—	—	—	—	—	—	—	—	Non-album singles
"Everything"	2023	—	—	—	—	—	—	—	—	—	—	Non-album singles
"Wonderful & Great"	2023	—	—	—	—	—	—	—	—	—	—	Non-album singles
"Big Love"	2024	—	—	—	—	—	—	—	—	—	—	Non-album singles
"—" denotes a single that did not chart or was not released.

==== As featured artist ====
Title	Year	Peak chart positions	Album
Title	Year	CIS	Album
"Beg" (with Omer Adam)	2018	—	Omer
"Moustache" (Little Big featuring Netta)	2021	38	Non-album single
"Efes Ma'amatz" (with Static & Ben-El)	2021	—	Sheva Yerachim

=== Other charted songs ===
Title	Year	Peak chart positions	Album or EP
Title	Year	POL	Album or EP
"Bassa Sababa" (Gromee Remix)	2019	23	Non-album single
"Nana Banana"	2019	—	Goody Bag

== Filmography ==
Year	Title	Role	Ref.
2020	Eurovision Song Contest: The Story of Fire Saga	Herself	
2020	Leak	Woman Sing	
2021	The X Factor Israel	Judge	
2024	Rokdim Im Kokhavim	Contestant	

== See also ==
- Music of Israel
- List of Jewish musicians
- Israel in the Eurovision Song Contest

Awards and achievements
Preceded by Imri	HaKokhav HaBa winner 2018	Succeeded by Kobi Marimi
Preceded by Imri with "I Feel Alive"	Israel in the Eurovision Song Contest; 2018	Succeeded by Kobi Marimi with "Home"
Preceded by (Portugal) Salvador Sobral with "Amar pelos dois"	Winner of the Eurovision Song Contest; 2018	Succeeded by (Netherlands) Duncan Laurence with "Arcade"
