= The Other Story (film) =

2018 film

- Film poster
- Directed by: Avi Nesher
- Written by: Avi Nesher
- Produced by: Avi Nesher
- Starring: Sasson Gabai; Yuval Segal; Joy Rieger; Maya Dagan; Nathan Goshen
- Music by: Nathan Goshen
- Release date: 7 September 2018 (TIFF)
- Running time: 112 minutes
- Country: Israel
- Language: Hebrew
- Box office: $135,191

The Other Story is a 2018 Israeli drama film written, produced and directed by Avi Nesher. It was screened in the Contemporary World Cinema section at the 2018 Toronto International Film Festival.

== Plot ==
The story follows the wedding planning of two Baalei Teshuva, and the bride's family's plans to sabotage the wedding. The film mainly focuses on the bride's complicated relationship with her father, as well as the divorced parents' relationship with each other.

== Cast ==
- Sasson Gabai as Shlomo Abadi
- Yuval Segal as Yonatan Abadi
- Joy Rieger as Anat Abadi
- Maya Dagan as Tali Abadi
- Nathan Goshen as Shahar, Anat's husband-to-be
