= Nathan Goshen =

Israeli musical artist

Nathan Goshen נתן גושן
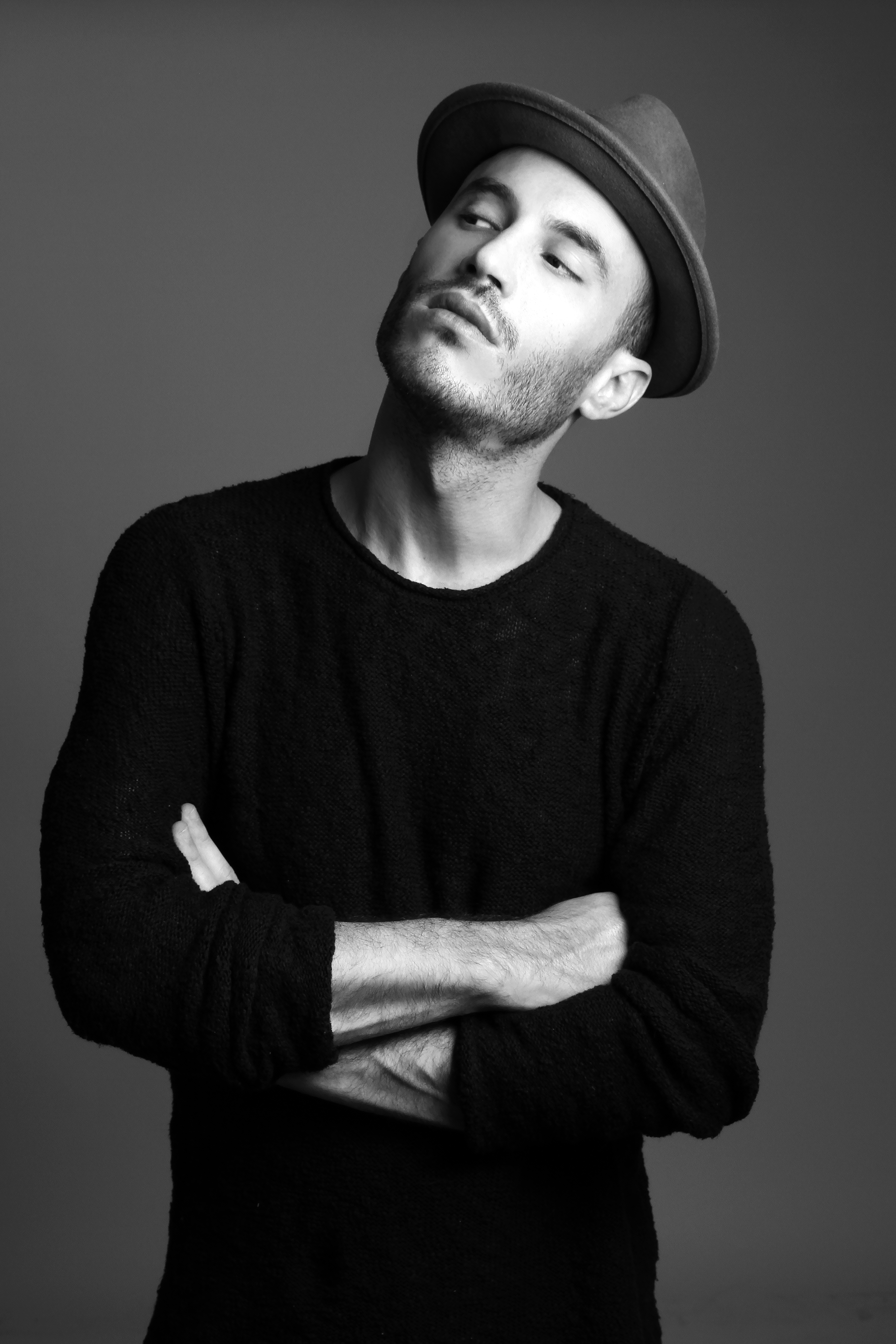

Background information
- Born: Matan Goshen; 6 August 1986 (age 39); Lod, Israel
- Genres: Pop; soft rock
- Occupations: Singer; songwriter; composer
- Instruments: Vocals; guitar; piano
- Label: Unicell

Nathan Goshen (Hebrew: נתן גושן; born 6 August 1986) is an Israeli singer-songwriter, composer, music arranger, musician and actor.

== Early life ==
Nathan Goshen was born as Matan Goshen (מתן גושן) in Lod, Israel, to Avidan Haim and Tova Goshen and grew up in a secular Jewish family. When Goshen was 14 years old he decided to become religious. He left his home to the Tomb of Rabbi Shimon Bar-Yochai, Mount Meron, where he stayed for 3 months. Then, he moved to reside in the Mea Shearim neighborhood, in Jerusalem, Israel.

In the Israel Defense Forces (IDF), Goshen served as a soldier at the headquarters of the Givati Brigade.

== Career ==
In 2010, Goshen wrote for Roni Dalumi's album Ktzat Acheret the songs "Ktzat Acheret and "Kach O Kach". The songs were released as singles and had been successful. At the end of the same year Goshen wrote to the Israeli singer Liran Danino the song "Ada'in Rek", this song had been successful also, and was introduced at the top of the record charts.

In 2011 Goshen featured on the single "How to Feel Alive" by Skazi. At the same year he released his first singles as singer. The songs "Kol Ma She'yesh Li" and "Eifo At" were introduced at the top of the record charts, and brought to Goshen's winning the title "Discovery of the Year" in the Israeli Annual Hebrew Song Chart of the radio station Galgalatz. His song "Gvulot Higayon" won the 4th place in the yearly annual of Galgalatz. Another song of Goshen that became famous in the same year was "Shniya Ve'od Achat" that he wrote to Boaz Ma'uda. Goshen's debut album, Nathan Goshen, was released in November 2011. In the album included Goshen's singles that were released before, and also two singles that were released after the album release, "Yode'a" and "Panim Acherot".

In March 2013, Goshen released his second album, Bein Kol Hare'ashim.

In July 2015 Goshen released the third single from his third album "Thinking About it (Let It Go)", the song became certified platinum in the Netherlands, and certified gold in Norway, Denmark and Sweden.

On 4 August 2015 Goshen released his third album, Dabri Iti Yoter.

On 4 February 2016 Goshen released a single named "Ze Shelanu". On 21 November 2016 Goshen released a single named "Hikiti". The song won the 19th place in the second annual of Galgalatz of 2016–2017 and the 26th place in the yearly annual of Reshet Gimel at the same year. On 24 May 2017 his fourth album, Shloshim (30), was released.

On 11 September Goshen released "Ke'Homer Be'yad Ha'yotzer", the first single from the album "Tzim'a 4", Israeli record producer Naor Carmi's project of Chabad niggunim albums.

On 24 September Goshen released an international single named "Home", the music video was released by Vevo.

In 2018 Goshen appeared in Avi Nesher's film "The Other Story" and also released the soundtrack of the film as album. In December of the same year Goshen released the song "Bati Lahlom".

In March 2019 Goshen released "Mitga'aga'at". In May of the same year, the song "Nana Banana" that he wrote with Stav Beger to Netta Barzilai was released.

In February 2020 Goshen released his fifth studio album Bati Lahlom (I Came to Dream). In the same month Goshen composed together with Stav Beger the song "Roots" for Eden Alene, which was one of 4 options to decide Israel's 2020 Eurovision entry.

In 2024, Goshen released a new album titled Nitzachonot Ktanim (Small Victories). The album explores themes of connection between the material and the spiritual, the sacred and the secular, and truth and falsehood, while grappling with issues such as success, exposure, and the pursuit of ambition.

== Personal life ==
Goshen is married and the father of a girl; he lives in Jerusalem.

== Discography ==
=== Studio albums ===
- Nathan Goshen (2011)
- Bein Kol Hareashim (2013)
- Dabri Iti Yoter (2015)
- Shloshim (2017)
- Bati Lahlom (2020)
- Nitzchonot Ktanim (2024)

=== Soundtracks ===
- Sipur Acher (2018)

== See also ==
- Music of Israel
- The Other Story
