= Israel in the Eurovision Song Contest 2013 =

- Eurovision Song Contest 2013
- Country: Israel
- Selection process: Kdam Eurovision 2013
- Selection date: 7 March 2013

Competing entry
- Song: "Rak Bishvilo"
- Artist: Moran Mazor
- Songwriters: Chen Harari; Gal Sarig

Placement
- Semi-final result: Failed to qualify (14th)

Participation chronology

Israel was represented at the Eurovision Song Contest 2013 with the song "Rak Bishvilo" written by Chen Harari and Gal Sarig. The song was performed by Moran Mazor. The Israeli entry for the 2013 contest in Malmö, Sweden was selected through the national final Kdam Eurovision 2013, organised by the Israeli broadcaster Israel Broadcasting Authority (IBA). The five show competition consisting of three semi-finals and a Second Chance round concluded with a final on 7 March 2013 that featured ten entries. "Rak Bishvilo" performed by Moran Mazor emerged as the winner after achieving the highest score following the combination of votes from a seven-member jury panel and a public vote.

Israel was drawn to compete in the second semi-final of the Eurovision Song Contest which took place on 16 May 2013. Performing during the show in position 10, "Rak Bishvilo" was not announced among the top 10 entries of the second semi-final and therefore did not qualify to compete in the final. It was later revealed that Israel placed fourteenth out of the 17 participating countries in the semi-final with 40 points.

== Background ==
Prior to the 2013 contest, Israel had participated in the Eurovision Song Contest thirty-five times since its first entry in 1973. Israel has won the contest on three occasions: in 1978 with the song "A-Ba-Ni-Bi" performed by Izhar Cohen and the Alphabeta, in 1979 with the song "Hallelujah" performed by Milk and Honey and in 1998 with the song "Diva" performed by Dana International. Since the introduction of semi-finals to the format of the Eurovision Song Contest in 2004, Israel has, to this point, managed to qualify to the final five times, including two top ten results in 2005 with Shiri Maimon and "HaSheket SheNish'ar" placing fourth, and in 2008 with Boaz and "The Fire in Your Eyes" placing ninth. In 2011 and 2012, Israel has failed to qualify to the final consecutively, which included their 2012 entry "Time" performed by Izabo.

The Israeli national broadcaster, Israel Broadcasting Authority (IBA) had been in charge of the nation's participation in the contest since its debut in 1973. Following prior announcements on 9 August 2012 that a national final under a new format would be organised in order to select the Israeli entry for 2013, IBA confirmed Israel's participation in the contest on 10 October 2013. The budget for the national final was estimated to be €400,000.

== Before Eurovision ==
=== Kdam Eurovision 2013 ===
The Israeli entry for the Eurovision Song Contest 2013 was selected through the national final Kdam Eurovision 2013. The competition consisted of five shows, which commenced with the first of three semi-finals on 26 February 2013 and concluded with a final on 7 March 2013. All shows in the competition took place at the Broadcast Studio Complex in Holon, hosted by Ron Shachar and 1991 Israeli Eurovision entrant Orna Datz and were broadcast on Channel 1 as well as online via IBA's official Eurovision Song Contest website Eurovil.

==== Format ====
30 entries were selected to compete over five shows which consisted of three semi-finals on 26, 27 and 28 February 2013 with ten entries taking part in each show, a second chance round on 3 March 2013, and a final on 7 March 2013. The top three entries from each semi-final advanced directly to the final, while the fourth and fifth placed entries advanced to the Second Chance round. The bottom five entries in each semi-final were eliminated. An additional entry qualified to the final from the Second Chance round, bringing the total number of competing entries in the final to ten. It was later announced that the competition format had been revised and only the fourth placed entry would advance to the Second Chance round from each semi-final with the bottom six entries being eliminated instead.

The public vote that took place in the five shows was conducted entirely through SMS. The results of the semi-finals were determined through the 50/50 combination of a public vote and the votes of a five-member jury panel, while in the Second Chance round, the results were determined solely by the public vote. In the final, the results were determined through the 50/50 combination of a public vote and the votes of a ten-member jury panel.

==== Competing entries ====
On 31 December 2012, IBA opened the public submission with the deadline on 16 January 2013. Thirty entries were chosen by a special committee consisting of music industry professionals and announced on 29 January 2013. The members of the committee were Moshe Morad (director of 88FM), Riki Gal (singer), Tomer G (DJ), Yossi Gispan (lyricist), Tal Argaman (music editor at 88FM), Gavri Mazor (ACUM representative), Dalit Cahana (vocal coach), Itzik Yehoshua (project manager of 88FM) and Roi Yechezkel (president of OGAE Israel). The competing songs in each semi-final were released online on 19, 20 and 21 February 2013, respectively.

Artist	Song	Songwriter(s)
Aderet	"Victory"	Aderet
Adi Cesare	"Lo Niten Lecha Lipol" (לא ניתן לך ליפול)	Adi Cesare
Adir Getz	"Ha'ikar She'ani Shar" (העיקר שאני שר)	Adir Getz
Alon Jean	"Lihyot Et Hayay" (חי את החיים)	Alon Jan, Baruch Fridland, Einat Hollander
Bezalel Raviv	"No War"	Eliayhu Siboni, Yotam Bekker, Bezalel Raviv
Chen Cohen	"Halev Mevakesh" (הלב מבקש)	Chen Cohen, Christina Yizhar
Hadar Uzeri	"Ten Maa'wal" (תן מעוואל)	Ronen Shaul Blonder, Hadar Ozeri
Haya Samir	"Happy and Sad"	Haya Samir
Hila Ben David	"Beautiful"	Gary Gazarkh
Judah Gavra	"Hayom" (היום)	Tomer Hadidi, Yehuda Gavra
Julietta	"Fantasia" (פנטזיה)	Doron Medalie
~~Kathleen Reiter~~	~~"Ad Elay" (עד אלי)~~	~~Dor Daniel, Sahar Hagai, Patricia Ori Cohen~~
Laila	"Bo" (בוא)	Yoni Roe
Lihi Griner and Omri "69" Segal	"Just Like Me"	Kraziner Lev, Omri Segal, Idan Roe
Liran Notik	"Alive"	Liran Notik
Meital De Razon and Asi Tal	"Toda la noche"	Asi Tal, Meital De Razon
Michael Harpaz	"Michtav Le'ima" (מכתב לאמא)	Michael Harpaz
Moran Mazor	"Rak Bishvilo" (רק בשבילו)	Chen Harari, Gal Sarig
Moran Mazoz	"Ten Li Siman" (תן לי סימן)	Shuli Yosef
Nicki Goldstein	"We Are One"	Niki Goldstein, Yaron Malachi
Ortal Ofek	"Tagid Li Lama" (תגידי לי למה)	Ortal Ofek
Ran Sandler	"Find a Way"	Doron Gal
Ron Weinreich	"Love Is One"	Yoad Fekete, Ron Weinreich
Roni Silver	"Belibi" (בליבי)	Idan Yaniv, Itay Zilberstein
Sarit Avitan	"Mon amour"	Sharona Pick, Mirit Shem Orr
Shany Zamir	"Forever"	Shani Zamir
SoulKey	"Living One Time"	Itzik Kreif, Eric Forman
The Ultras	"Happy Birthday"	Eli Peretz, Dan Bartov, Cedric Ben Shabat
Vladi Blayberg	"We Are Free"	Doron Plaskov, Saar Badishi, Noy Alooshe
Yarden Tzur	"Replace You"	Yarden Tzur

==== Shows ====
===== Semi-final 1 =====
The first semi-final took place on 26 February 2013. "Forever" performed by Shany Zamir, "Love Is One" performed by Ron Weinreich and "Ad Elay" performed by Kathleen Reiter qualified directly to the final, while "Hayom" performed by Judah Gavra advanced to the Second Chance round. In addition to the performances of the competing entries, Moshe Peretz performed the Eurovision Song Contest 1979 winning song "Hallelujah" as the interval act. The jury panel that voted in the first semi-final consisted of Ilanit (1973 and 1977 Israeli Eurovision entrant), Moshe Datz (1991 Israeli Eurovision entrant), Dafna Dekel (1992 Israeli Eurovision entrant), Uri Paster (theatre and cinema director) and Mira Awad (2009 Israeli Eurovision entrant). On 6 March 2013, Kathleen Reiter who initially directly qualified from the first semi-final announced her withdrawal from the competition.

Advanced to the final Advanced to the second chance round

Draw	Artist	Song	Result
1	Laila	"Bo"	Eliminated
2	Adir Getz	"Ha'ikar She'ani Shar"	Eliminated
3	Ortal Ofek	"Tagid Li Lama"	Eliminated
4	Adi Cesare	"Lo Niten Lecha Lipol"	Eliminated
5	Shany Zamir	"Forever"	Advanced
6	Ron Weinreich	"Love Is One"	Advanced
7	Aderet	"Victory"	Eliminated
~~8~~	~~Kathleen Reiter~~	~~"Ad Elay"~~	~~Withdrawn~~
9	Judah Gavra	"Hayom"	Advanced
10	Lihi Griner and Omri "69" Segal	"Just Like Me"	Eliminated

===== Semi-final 2 =====
The second semi-final took place on 27 February 2013. "Find a Way" performed by Ran Sandler, "Ten Li Siman" performed by Moran Mazoz and "We Are Free" performed by Vladi Blayberg qualified directly to the final, while "Replace You" performed by Yarden Tzur advanced to the Second Chance round. In addition to the performances of the competing entries, Asaf Hertz and Eleana Tidhar performed the Israeli Eurovision Song Contest 1981 entry "Halayla" as the interval act. The jury panel that voted in the second semi-final consisted of Ilanit (1973 and 1977 Israeli Eurovision entrant), Moshe Datz (1991 Israeli Eurovision entrant), Dafna Dekel (1992 Israeli Eurovision entrant), Uri Paster (theatre and cinema director) and Mira Awad (2009 Israeli Eurovision entrant).

Advanced to the final Advanced to the second chance round

Draw	Artist	Song	Result
1	Sarit Avitan	"Mon amour"	Eliminated
2	Chen Cohen	"Halev Mevakesh"	Eliminated
3	The Ultras	"Happy Birthday"	Eliminated
4	Ran Sandler	"Find a Way"	Advanced
5	Moran Mazoz	"Ten Li Siman"	Advanced
6	SoulKey	"Living One Time"	Eliminated
7	Haya Samir	"Happy and Sad"	Eliminated
8	Vladi Blayberg	"We Are Free"	Advanced
9	Yarden Tzur	"Replace You"	Advanced
10	Roni Silver	"Belibi"	Eliminated

===== Semi-final 3 =====
The third semi-final took place on 28 February 2013. "Toda la noche" performed by Meital De Razon & Asi Tal, "Beautiful" performed by Hila Ben David and "Rak Bishvilo" performed by Moran Mazor qualified directly to the final, while "We Are One" performed by Nicki Goldstein advanced to the Second Chance round. In addition to the performances of the competing entries, Asaf Hertz and Eleana Tidhar performed "Shvil ha'bricha" by Rita as the interval act. The jury panel that voted in the third semi-final consisted of Ilanit (1973 and 1977 Israeli Eurovision entrant), Moshe Datz (1991 Israeli Eurovision entrant), Dafna Dekel (1992 Israeli Eurovision entrant), Uri Paster (theatre and cinema director) and Mira Awad (2009 Israeli Eurovision entrant).

Advanced to the final Advanced to the second chance round

Draw	Artist	Song	Result
1	Liran Notik	"Alive"	Eliminated
2	Meital De Razon and Asi Tal	"Toda la noche"	Advanced
3	Alon Jean	"Lihyot Et Hayay"	Eliminated
4	Bezalel Raviv	"No War"	Eliminated
5	Hadar Uzeri	"Ten Maa'wal"	Eliminated
6	Michael Harpaz	"Michtav Le'ima"	Eliminated
7	Nicki Goldstein	"We Are One"	Advanced
8	Hila Ben David	"Beautiful"	Advanced
9	Julietta	"Fantasia"	Eliminated
10	Moran Mazor	"Rak Bishvilo"	Advanced

===== Second chance round =====
The Second chance round took place on 3 March 2013. The three entries that placed fourth in the preceding three semi-finals competed and "Hayom" performed by Judah Gavra qualified to the final solely by SMS votes from the public. On 6 March 2013, "We Are One" performed by Nicki Goldstein, who placed second, was announced to also have qualified to the final in order to replace Kathleen Reiter who initially directly qualified from the first semi-final but announced her withdrawal from the competition.

Advanced to the final Replacement act

Draw	Artist	Song	Place	Result
1	Judah Gavra	"Hayom"	1	Advanced
2	Yarden Tsur	"Replace You"	3	Eliminated
3	Nicki Goldstein	"We Are One"	2	Advanced

===== Final =====
The final took place on 7 March 2013. Ten entries competed during the show. Eight of the entries qualified directly from the semi-finals, while two of the competing entries qualified from the Second Chance round. The winner, "Rak Bishvilo" performed by Moran Mazor, was selected by a 50/50 combination of the votes from an expert jury panel and a public vote. The viewers and the juries each had a total of 301 points to award. Each jury member distributed their points as follows: 1, 2, 4, 6, 8, 10 and 12 points. The viewer vote was based on the percentage of votes each song achieved through SMS voting. For example, if a song gained 10% of the viewer vote, then that entry would be awarded 10% of 301 points rounded to the nearest integer: 30 points. In addition to the performances of the competing entries, Miri Mesika and Shlomi Shabat performed as the interval acts. The jury panel that voted in the final consisted of Ilanit (1973 and 1977 Israeli Eurovision entrant), Moshe Datz (1991 Israeli Eurovision entrant), Dafna Dekel (1992 Israeli Eurovision entrant), Uri Paster (theatre and cinema director), Eldad Shrem (composer of the Israeli Eurovision Song Contest 1977 entry), Sharon Haziz (singer and actress) and Svika Pick (singer and composer of the Israeli Eurovision Song Contest 1998 and 2002 entries).

Draw	Artist	Song	Jury	Televote	Total	Place
1	Judah Gavra	"Hayom"	23	36	59	4
2	Moran Mazoz	"Ten Li Siman"	13	23	36	9
3	Ron Weinreich	"Love Is One"	64	31	95	2
4	Shany Zamir	"Forever"	0	44	44	6
5	Hila Ben David	"Beautiful"	28	16	44	7
6	Ran Sandler	"Find a Way"	28	29	57	5
7	Meital De Razon and Asi Tal	"Toda la noche"	47	40	87	3
8	Moran Mazor	"Rak Bishvilo"	64	40	104	1
9	Vladi Blayberg	"We Are Free"	12	29	41	8
10	Nicki Goldstein	"We Are One"	22	13	35	10

Detailed Jury Votes
Draw	Song	Ilanit	M. Datz	D. Dekel	U. Paster	E. Shrem	S. Haziz	S. Pick	Total
1	"Hayom"	6		1	4		4	8	23
2	"Ten Li Siman"	4	6		1			2	13
3	"Love Is One"	8	8	12	12	12	12		64
4	"Forever"								0
5	"Beautiful"	1	4	6	2	1	2	12	28
6	"Find a Way"			4	6	8		10	28
7	"Toda la noche"	10	10	8	8	4	6	1	47
8	"Rak Bishvilo"	12	12	10	10	10	10		64
9	"We Are Free"	2	1			2	1	6	12
10	"We Are One"		2	2		6	8	4	22

== At Eurovision ==
According to Eurovision rules, all nations with the exceptions of the host country and the "Big Five" (France, Germany, Italy, Spain and the United Kingdom) are required to qualify from one of two semi-finals in order to compete for the final; the top ten countries from each semi-final progress to the final. The European Broadcasting Union (EBU) split up the competing countries into six different pots based on voting patterns from previous contests, with countries with favourable voting histories put into the same pot. On 17 January 2013, a special allocation draw was held which placed each country into one of the two semi-finals, as well as which half of the show they would perform in. The EBU's Reference Group approved a request by the Israeli broadcaster for Israel to compete in the second semi-final on 16 May 2013 due to the date of the first semi-final, 14 May 2013, coinciding with the Yom Hazikaron memorial day. During the allocation draw, it was determined that Israel would perform in the second half of the second semi-final.

Once all the competing songs for the 2013 contest had been released, the running order for the semi-finals was decided by the shows' producers rather than through another draw, so that similar songs were not placed next to each other. Israel was set to perform in position 10, following the entry from Greece and before the entry from Armenia.

In Israel, the two semi-finals and the final were televised live on Channel 1 with Hebrew subtitles and Channel 33 with Arabic subtitles. The three shows were also broadcast via radio on 88 FM with commentary by Kobi Menora, who was joined by Ofer Nachshon in the first semi-final, Amit Kotler and Yuval Caspin in the second semi-final, and Ron Levinthal, Kobi Oshrat and Yhaloma Bat Porat in the final. The Israeli spokesperson, who announced the Israeli votes during the final, was Ofer Nachshon.

=== Semi-final ===
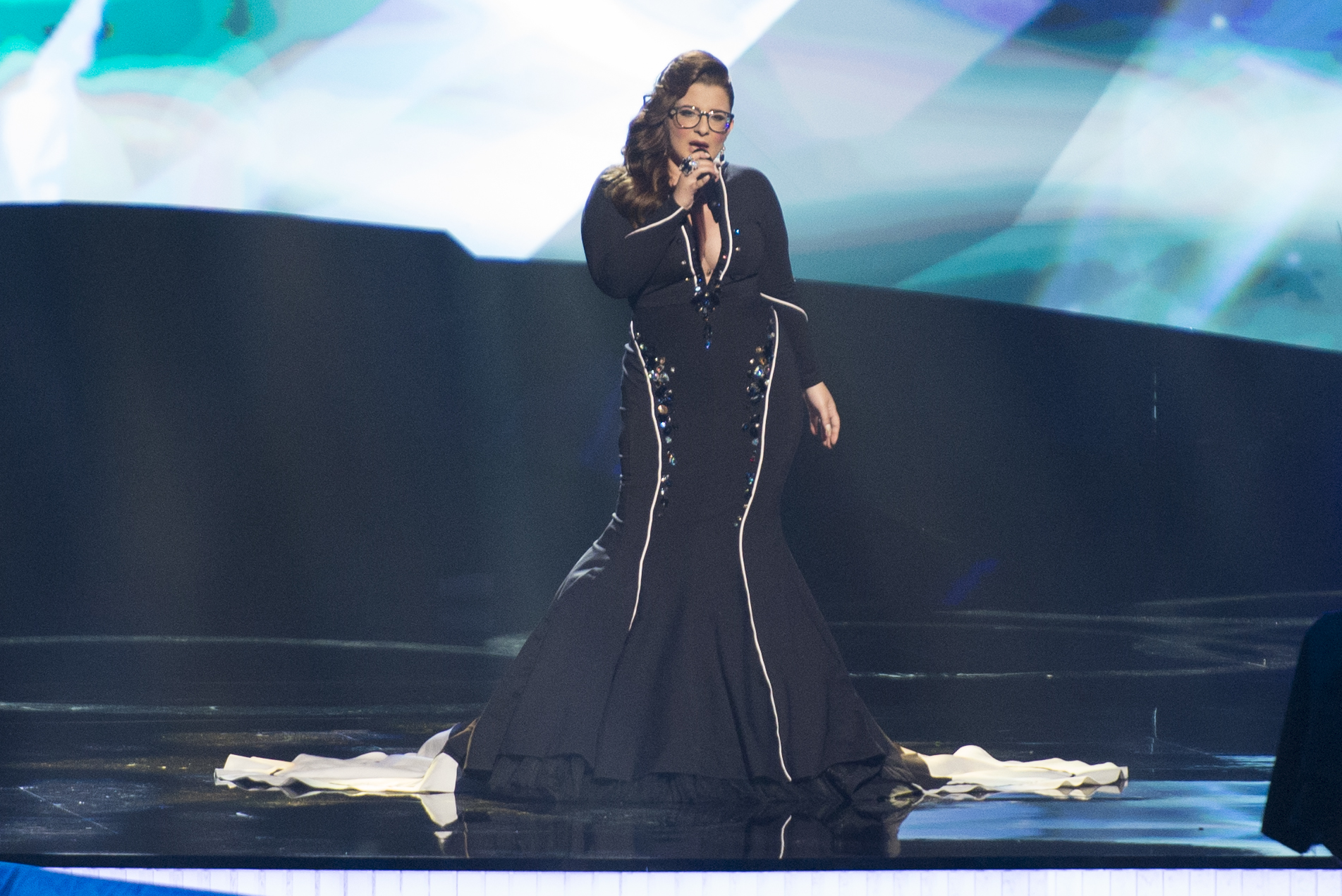
Moran Mazor during a rehearsal before the second semi-final

Moran Mazor took part in technical rehearsals on 9 and 11 May, followed by dress rehearsals on 15 and 16 May. This included the jury show on 15 May where the professional juries of each country watched and voted on the competing entries.

The Israeli performance featured Moran Mazor performing in a long sequined black dress adorned with costume jewelry together with three backing vocalists, one of which also played a piano. The stage was predominately dark with the LED screens displaying dark blue colours. The three backing vocalists performing on stage with Moran Mazor were Avia Shoshani, Chen Metzger-Eder and Daniel Skaat, brother of 2010 Israeli Eurovision entrant Harel Skaat.

At the end of the show, Israel was not announced among the top 10 entries in the second semi-final and therefore failed to qualify to compete in the final. It was later revealed that Israel placed fourteenth in the semi-final, receiving a total of 40 points.

=== Voting ===
Voting during the three shows involved each country awarding points from 1-8, 10 and 12 as determined by a combination of 50% national jury and 50% televoting. Each nation's jury consisted of five music industry professionals who are citizens of the country they represent. This jury judged each entry based on: vocal capacity; the stage performance; the song's composition and originality; and the overall impression by the act. In addition, no member of a national jury was permitted to be related in any way to any of the competing acts in such a way that they cannot vote impartially and independently.

Below is a breakdown of points awarded to Israel and awarded by Israel in the second semi-final and grand final of the contest, and the breakdown of the jury voting and televoting conducted during the two shows:

==== Points awarded to Israel ====
Points awarded to Israel (Semi-final 2)
Score	Country
12 points	
10 points	
8 points	
7 points	
6 points	Armenia; Azerbaijan
5 points	Georgia
4 points	Bulgaria; France; Germany
3 points	Albania; Spain
2 points	Finland; Romania
1 point	Iceland

==== Points awarded by Israel ====
Points awarded by Israel (Semi-final 2)
Score	Country
12 points	Azerbaijan
10 points	Romania
8 points	Armenia
7 points	Georgia
6 points	Greece
5 points	Norway
4 points	San Marino
3 points	Hungary
2 points	Malta
1 point	Finland

Points awarded by Israel (Final)
Score	Country
12 points	Azerbaijan
10 points	Ukraine
8 points	Denmark
7 points	Russia
6 points	Norway
5 points	Germany
4 points	Finland
3 points	Belarus
2 points	Greece
1 point	Moldova
