= The Voice Israel season 1 =

The Voice Israel
- Season 1
- Hosted by: Michael Aloni
- Coaches: Shlomi Shabat; Aviv Geffen; Rami Kleinstein; Sarit Hadad
- Winner: Kathleen Reiter
- Winning mentor: Sarit Hadad
- Runner-up: Raz Shmueli
- Finals venue: 'Kiryat ha'tikshoret' (Media's complex) of "Globus group" company in Neve Ilan on Jerusalem mountains

Release
- Original network: Channel 2 (Reshet)
- Original release: 2012

Season chronology
- Next → Season 2

The Voice Israel (Season 1) is the first season of the reality show The Voice Israel, which focuses on finding the next Israeli pop star. It is hosted by Michael Aloni with coaches Shlomi Shabat, Sarit Hadad, Aviv Geffen, and Rami Kleinstein. Kathleen Reiter was declared the winner, with Raz Shmueli as a runner-up.

== Summary of competitors ==
Competitors' table
– Winner
– Runner-up
– 2nd Runner-up
– Eliminated

| Team | Acts | | | | | |
|---|---|---|---|---|---|---|
| Shlomi Shabat | Maor Titon | Topaz Abadang | Roee Nuriel | Gal Binyamin | Yuval Dayan | Tzahi Halevi |
| Aviv Geffen | Sivan Talmor | Noaa Golan Barel | Yahal Doron and Guy Mantash | Dana Dor | Lionel Faretein | Raz Shmueli |
| Sarit Hadad | Matan Shemer | Loren De Paz | Or Eddie | Or Hamri | Ido Tzuriel | Kathleen Reiter |
| Rami Kleinstein | Orit Shalom | Meital Michaeli | Yosef Buchnick | Gadi Altman | Or Cohen | Chanan Ben Simon |

== Result Tables ==
=== The Blind Auditions ===
| Key | Coach hit his or her "I WANT YOU" button | Contestant eliminated with no coach pressing his or her "I WANT YOU" button | Contestant defaulted to this coach's team | Contestant elected to join this coach's team |

==== Episode 1 ====
| Order | Contestant | Song | Coaches' and Contestants' Choices | | | |
| Order | Contestant | Song | Shlomi | Aviv | Sarit | Rami |
|---|---|---|---|---|---|---|
| 1 | Or Eddie | "כשהלב בוכה" | | — | | — |
| 2 | Gilan Shahaf | "מרוב אהבה שותק" | | | | |
| 3 | Aviv Weitz | "מי תרצי שאהיה" | — | — | — | — |
| 4 | Kathleen Reiter | "Rolling in the Deep" | | | | |
| 5 | Maor Titon | "קצת משונה" | | | | — |
| 6 | Or Hamri | "כשאחר" | — | | | — |
| 7 | Sany and Shany | "מעליות" | — | — | — | — |
| 8 | Ruz Smuali | "קשה בלעדייך" | | | | |
| 9 | Sivan Elbaz | "חלומות" | — | — | — | — |
| 10 | Noa Golan Barel | "Someone like You" | | | | |

==== Episode 2: January 13, 2012 ====
| Order | Contestant | Song | Coaches' and Contestants' Choices | | | |
| Order | Contestant | Song | Shlomi | Aviv | Sarit | Rami |
|---|---|---|---|---|---|---|
| 1 | Topaz Abadang | "אם אלה החיים" | | — | — | — |
| 2 | Omer Tal | "שיר של יום חולין" | — | — | — | — |
| 3 | Yuval Dayan | "שאריות של החיים" | | | | |
| 4 | Ohad Ben Nun | "אנא אפנה" | — | — | — | |
| 5 | Chanan Ben Simon | "My Prerogative" | | | | |
| 6 | Tomer Mamiya | "תגידי" | — | — | — | — |
| 7 | Hen Gueta | "עננים" | | | | |
| 8 | Roee Edri | "Crazy" | | — | | |
| 9 | Shiri Ruda | "לומדת לעוף" | — | — | — | — |
| 10 | Tzili Yanko | "Strong Enough" | — | | — | — |

==== Episode 3: January 20, 2012 ====
| Order | Contestant | Song | Coaches' and Contestants' Choices | | | |
| Order | Contestant | Song | Shlomi | Aviv | Sarit | Rami |
|---|---|---|---|---|---|---|
| 1 | Daniel Mekira | "עץ ירוק מפלסטיק" | | — | | — |
| 2 | Joseph Bouhnik | "נאחז באוויר" | | | — | |
| 3 | Adi Buskila | "מקסיקו" | — | — | — | — |
| 4 | Sivan Talmor | "יקירתי" | | | — | |
| 5 | Ido Zuriel | "ניצחת איתי הכול" | — | — | | — |
| 6 | Roy Ben Shimol | "כל מה שתרצי" | — | — | — | — |
| 7 | Gadi Altman | "Against All Odds" | | | | |
| 8 | Coral Bismuth | "ואיך שלא" | | — | | — |
| 9 | Yaniv Peleg | "Easy" | — | — | — | — |
| 10 | Inbar Israel | "מאחלת לך" | | — | — | |
| 11 | Lionel Faretein | "האמנם" | — | | — | |

==== Episode 4: January 28, 2012 ====
| Order | Contestant | Song | Coaches' and Contestants' Choices | | | |
| Order | Contestant | Song | Shlomi | Aviv | Sarit | Rami |
|---|---|---|---|---|---|---|
| 1 | Loo Michaeli | "אצלי הכל בסדר" | — | — | — | — |
| 2 | Tzahi Halevi | "Rolling in the Deep" | | | — | — |
| 3 | Eliad Ifergan | "הקולות של פיראוס" | — | — | | — |
| 4 | Inbal Gershkovitz | "Hallelujah" | | | | |
| 5 | Or Cohen | "מנהר לי משיתי" | — | | — | |
| 6 | Loren De Paz | "נשקי אותי" | | — | | |
| 7 | Mattia Pironti | "Grenade" | | | | |
| 8 | Assaf Matana | "בואי אמא" | | | | — |
| 9 | Itay Taasa | "עומד על צוק" | — | — | — | — |
| 10 | Ariel Benoash | "סוף העולם" | | | | — |
| 11 | Imri Ziv | "אהובתי" | — | — | | |

==== Episode 5: February 5, 2012 ====
| Order | Contestant | Song | Coaches' and Contestants' Choices | | | |
| Order | Contestant | Song | Shlomi | Aviv | Sarit | Rami |
|---|---|---|---|---|---|---|
| 1 | Jonathan Mashiah | "For Your Babies" | — | — | — | — |
| 2 | Ami Mashiah | "אהבה קצרה" | — | — | | — |
| 3 | Keren Or | "אצלך בעולם" | | — | — | |
| 4 | Yahel & Guy | "שאריות של החיים" | | | | |
| 5 | Gal Binyamin | "אל תשטה באהבה" | | — | — | — |
| 6 | Neta Li | "Sweet Child o' Mine" | — | — | — | |
| 7 | Inna Skytl | "האם היית" | — | — | — | — |
| 8 | Orit Shalom | "Halo" | | — | | |
| 9 | Chen Cohen | "כל מה שיש לי" | | | | |
| 10 | Aviva Dese | "שווים" | — | — | | — |
| 11 | Dana Dor | "Stop and Stare" | — | | — | — |

==== Episode 6 ====
| Order | Contestant | Song | Coaches' and Contestants' Choices | | | |
| Order | Contestant | Song | Shlomi | Aviv | Sarit | Rami |
|---|---|---|---|---|---|---|
| 1 | Efrat Dahan | "הרדופים" | — | — | — | — |
| 2 | Barak Biton | "כמעט סתיו" | | — | | — |
| 3 | Alon Shar | "עד מחר" | | | | |
| 4 | Yasmin Levy | "ארץ חדשה" | — | | — | |
| 5 | Snir Abecassis | "יש לי סיכוי להינצל" | — | | — | — |
| 6 | Jenny Pankin | "כמה פעמים" | | — | — | — |
| 7 | Meital Michaeli | "Amie" | | | | |
| 8 | Roee Cohen | "בא מן השתיקה" | | — | — | — |
| 9 | Gal Eidinger | "למחרת" | — | — | — | — |
| 10 | Mor Mendal | "אין לי מקום" | — | | — | — |
| 11 | Tal Etzion | "ואני שר" | | — | | — |

==== Episode 7 ====
| Order | Contestant | Song | Coaches' and Contestants' Choices | | | |
| Order | Contestant | Song | Shlomi | Aviv | Sarit | Rami |
|---|---|---|---|---|---|---|
| 1 | Matan Keli | "איפה את אהובתי" | — | — | — | |
| 2 | Adar Hayat | "כל מה שיש לי" | — | — | | — |
| 3 | Michal Geva | "שלח לי מלאך" | | | | |
| 4 | Liron Yoeli | "עכשיו אתה חוזר בחזרה" | — | — | — | —N/a |
| 5 | Matan Shemer | "כשאת עצובה" | | — | | —N/a |
| 6 | Etzion Meir | "הינך יפה" | | — | —N/a | —N/a |
| 7 | Valntien Komisrock | "This Love" | — | — | —N/a | —N/a |
| 8 | Udi David | "אנא אפנה" | | — | —N/a | —N/a |
| 9 | Shay Moshe | "לרוץ מהר" | —N/a | — | —N/a | —N/a |
| 10 | Nadav Livhaver | "Your Song" | —N/a | | —N/a | —N/a |

=== Episodes 8–11: Battle Rounds ===
– Battle Winner

| Week/Order | Coach | Contestant | Contestant | Song |
|---|---|---|---|---|
| 1.1 | Aviv Geffen | Inbal Gershkovitz | Sivan Talmor | "Imagine" |
| 1.2 | Sarit Hadad | Matan Shemer | Hen Gueta | "ללכת" |
| 1.3 | Rami Kleinstein | Matan Keli | Keren Or | "זן נדיר" |
| 1.4 | Shlomi Shabat | Roee Edri | Etzion Meir | "Mad World" |
| 1.5 | Aviv Geffen | Mor Mendel | Noa Golan Barel | "גיבור גדול" |
| 1.6 | Rami Kleinstein | Orit Shalom | Imri Ziv | "פרפרים" |
| 1.7 | Shlomi Shabat | Tzahi Halevi | Roee Cohen | "אהבה קצרה" |
| 2.1 | Rami Kleinstein | Maytal Michaeli | Gilan Shahaf | "True Colors" |
| 2.2 | Shlomi Shabat | Daniel Mekira | Topaz Abadang | "הלב" |
| 2.3 | Sarit Hadad | Eliad Infagern | Or Hamri | "שמחות קטנות" |
| 2.4 | Aviv Geffen | Alon Shar | Lionel Faretein | "One Day in Your Life" |
| 2.5 | Shlomi Shabat | Tal Etzion | Gal Binyamin | "האם להיות בך מאוהב" |
| 2.6 | Rami Kleinstein | Michal Geva | Chanan Ben Simon | "Back To Black" |
| 2.7 | Sarit Hadad | Adar Hayat | Barak Biton | "יש לך אותי" |
| 3.1 | Rami Kleinstein | Yasmin Levi | Or Cohen | "אתה פה חסר לי" |
| 3.2 | Aviv Geffen | Raz Shmueli | Tzili Yanko | "Out Here on My Own" |
| 3.3 | Sarit Hadad | Or Eddie | Coral Bismuth | "אמא יקרה" |
| 3.4 | Rami Kleinstein | Ohad Ben Nun | Yosef Buchnick | "ואחרי ככלות הכל והתמונה" |
| 3.5 | Sarit Hadad | Kathleen Reiter | Aviva Dese | "I Kissed a Girl" |
| 3.6 | Shlomi Shabat | Inbar Israel | Udi David | "כמה אהבה" |
| 3.7 | Aviv Geffen | Yahel & Guy | Matia Pironti | "Special needs" |
| 4.1 | Sarit Hadad | Ido Tzuriel | Asaf Matana | "האחת שלי" |
| 4.2 | Rami Kleinstein | Neta Li | Gadi Altman | "Use Somebody" |
| 4.3 | Shlomi Shabat | Chen Cohen | Maor Titon | "מורה לחיים" |
| 4.4 | Aviv Geffen | Dana Dor | Ariel Benoash | "Forever Young" |
| 4.5 | Shlomi Shabat | Yuval Dayan | Jeni Pankin | "The End of the World" |
| 4.6 | Sarit Hadad | Ami Mashiah | Loren de Puz | "חלום כחול" |
| 4.7 | Aviv Geffen | Snir Abuksis | Nadav Livhaver | "מה אתה בכלל יודע על אהבה" |

==== Episode 12 ====
===== The Sing-off =====
| Sing Off # | Coach | Contestant | Song | Contestant | Song |
|---|---|---|---|---|---|
| 1 | Rami | Orit Shalom | "Hallo" | Keren Or | "אצלך בעולם" |
| 2 | Sarit | Barak Biton | "כמעט סתיו" | Matan Shemer | "כשאת עצובה" |
| 3 | Shlomi | Udi David | "אנא אפנה" | Topaz Abadang | "אם אלה החיים" |
| 4 | Aviv | Snir Abuksis | "יש לי עוד סיכוי להינצל" | Dana Dor | "Stop and Stare" |

=== Live Shows ===
==== Episodes 13-14: Top 24 ====
Each coach remain with six artists at this stage. Each coach in his/her turn chose threesome from that team, the after their performances, the artist that received the most public votes advanced to the next stage automatically and the coach chose between the two remaining artists who will advance and who will be eliminated from the competition.

Colour key:

| Artist received the most public votes and advanced to the next stage |
| Artist advanced to the next stage because his/her coach decision |
| Artist was eliminated |

===== Episode 13 =====
| Order | Coach | Artist | Song | Result |
|---|---|---|---|---|
| 1 | Rami Kleinstein | Orit Shalom | "טלפני טלפני" | Eliminated |
| 1 | Rami Kleinstein | Yosef Buchnick | "You're Beautiful" | Saved by coach |
| 1 | Rami Kleinstein | Gadi Altman | "מחוזקים לעולם" | Audience decision |
| 2 | Sarit Hadad | Ido Tzuriel | "נולדת בשבילי" | Saved by coach |
| 2 | Sarit Hadad | Kathleen Reiter | "Listen" | Audience decision |
| 2 | Sarit Hadad | Matan Shemer | "תגידי שטוב" | Eliminated |
| 3 | Shlomi Shabat | Gal Binyamin | "מה שהלב בחר" | Saved by coach |
| 3 | Shlomi Shabat | Maor Titon | "בלוז כנעני" | Eliminated |
| 3 | Shlomi Shabat | Roee Edri | "One Day" | Audience decision |
| 4 | Aviv Geffen | Sivan Talmor | "פמלה" | Eliminated |
| 4 | Aviv Geffen | Dana Dor | "Fix You" | Audience decision |
| 4 | Aviv Geffen | Raz Shmueli | "מדוע לא באת" | Saved by coach |

===== Episode 14 =====
| Order | Coach | Artist | Song | Result |
|---|---|---|---|---|
| 1 | Sarit Hadad | Or Hamri | "את המחר שלי" | Audience decision |
| 1 | Sarit Hadad | Loren De Paz | "I Saved the World Today" | Eliminated |
| 1 | Sarit Hadad | Or Eddie | "תשאירי לי מקום לחבק אותך" | Saved by coach |
| 2 | Rami Kleinstein | Meital Michaeli | "אתה לי ארץ" | Eliminated |
| 2 | Rami Kleinstein | Chanan Ben Simon | "Paparazzi" | Saved by coach |
| 2 | Rami Kleinstein | Or Cohen | "אם את עדיין אוהבת אותי" | Audience decision |
| 3 | Shlomi Shabat | Tzahi Halevi | "Moves like Jagger" | Saved by coach |
| 3 | Shlomi Shabat | Topaz Abadang | "רגע פרטי" | Eliminated |
| 3 | Shlomi Shabat | Yuval Dayan | "מנגב לך את הדמעות" | Audience decision |
| 4 | Aviv Geffen | Noa Golan Barel | "תמיד כשאתה בא" | Eliminated |
| 4 | Aviv Geffen | Yahel & Guy | "Chasing Cars" | Saved by coach |
| 4 | Aviv Geffen | Lionel Faretein | "שלכת" | Audience decision |

==== Episodes 15-16: Top 16 ====
At this stage, each team remains with four artists. after their performances, two artist that received the most public votes advanced to the next stage automatically and the coach chose between the two remaining artist who will advance and who will eliminate from the competition.

Colour key:

| Artist received sufficient public votes and advanced to the Quarter finals |
| Artist advanced to the Quarter finals because his/her coach decision |
| Artist was eliminated |

===== Episode 15 =====
- Group performances: Sarit Team with Sarit Hadad ("מרוץ החיים"); Aviv Team with Aviv Geffen ("השיר שלנו").

| Order | Coach | Artist | Song | Result |
|---|---|---|---|---|
| 1 | Aviv Geffen | Yahel & Guy | "אור הירח" | Eliminated |
| 1 | Aviv Geffen | Dana Dor | "One" | Audience decision |
| 1 | Aviv Geffen | Lionel Faretein | "גשם" | Saved by coach |
| 1 | Aviv Geffen | Raz Shmueli | "ימי בנימינה" | Audience decision |
| 2 | Sarit Hadad | Ido Tzuriel | "סוד המזלות" | Saved by coach |
| 2 | Sarit Hadad | Or Hamri | "יום אחד תבקשי" | Audience decision |
| 2 | Sarit Hadad | Kathleen Reiter | "Je suis malade" | Audience decision |
| 2 | Sarit Hadad | Or Eddie | "רציתי שתדע" | Eliminated |

===== Episode 16 =====
- Group performances: Shlomi Team with Shlomi Shabat ("תנו לגדול בשקט"); Rami Team with Rami Kleinstein ("עניין של זמן").

| Order | Coach | Artist | Song | Result |
|---|---|---|---|---|
| 1 | Shlomi Shabat | Tzahi Halevi | "Aïcha" | Audience decision |
| 1 | Shlomi Shabat | Gal Binyamin | "ירח" | Saved by coach |
| 1 | Shlomi Shabat | Roee Edri | "Every Breath You Take" | Eliminated |
| 1 | Shlomi Shabat | Yuval Dayan | "אייכה" | Audience decision |
| 2 | Rami Kleinstein | Yosef Buchnick | "שום דבר לא יפגע בי" | Eliminated |
| 2 | Rami Kleinstein | Chanan Ben Simon | "Don't Stop Me Now" | Audience decision |
| 2 | Rami Kleinstein | Or Cohen | "דרך" | Audience decision |
| 2 | Rami Kleinstein | Gadi Altman | "מאיה" | Saved by coach |

==== Episode 17: Top 12 - Quarter finals ====
At this stage, each team remains with four artists. after their performances, the artist that received the most public votes advanced to the Semi finals automatically and the coach chose between the two remaining artist who will advance and who will eliminate from the competition.

Colour key:

| Artist received the most public votes and advanced to the Semi finals |
| Artist advanced to the Semi finals because his/her coach decision |
| Artist was eliminated |

| Order | Coach | Artist | Song | Result |
|---|---|---|---|---|
| 1 | Sarit Hadad | Ido Tzuriel | "שיר ישן" | Saved by coach |
| 1 | Sarit Hadad | Or Hamri | "לב שלם" | Eliminated |
| 1 | Sarit Hadad | Kathleen Reiter | "ממעמקים" | Audience decision |
| 2 | Rami Kleinstein | Gadi Altman | "Viva la Vida" | Eliminated |
| 2 | Rami Kleinstein | Chanan Ben Simon | "לראות את האור" | Saved by coach |
| 2 | Rami Kleinstein | Or Cohen | "כולם יודעים" | Audience decision |
| 3 | Shlomi Shabat | Yuval Dayan | "Marry You" | Audience decision |
| 3 | Shlomi Shabat | Gal Binyamin | "מחכה" | Eliminated |
| 3 | Shlomi Shabat | Tzahi Halevi | "Maniac" | Saved by coach |
| 4 | Aviv Geffen | Lionel Faretein | "Creep" | Saved by coach |
| 4 | Aviv Geffen | Raz Shmueli | "אנחנו שניים" | Audience decision |
| 4 | Aviv Geffen | Dana Dor | "Perfect" | Eliminated |

==== Episode 18: Top 8 - Semi finals ====
At this stage, the coaches will have a 50/50 say with the audience and the public in deciding which artists move on to the Final.

Colour key:

| Artist was advanced to the Final |
| Artist was eliminated |

| Order | Coach | Artist | Song | Battle song | Coach points (%) | Public points (%) | Total | Result |
|---|---|---|---|---|---|---|---|---|
| 1 | Aviv Geffen | Lionel Faretein | "Losing My Religion" | "The Winner Takes It All" | 50 | 46 | 96 | Eliminated |
| 1 | Aviv Geffen | Raz Shmueli | "סליחות" | "The Winner Takes It All" | 50 | 54 | 104 | Advanced |
| 2 | Rami Kleinstein | Or Cohen | "ככה זה" | "לא אני הוא האיש" | 45 | 51 | 96 | Eliminated |
| 2 | Rami Kleinstein | Chanan Ben Simon | "Heal the World" | "לא אני הוא האיש" | 55 | 49 | 104 | Advanced |
| 3 | Sarit Hadad | Kathleen Reiter | "Valerie" | "שתיים בלילה" | 60 | 65 | 125 | Advanced |
| 3 | Sarit Hadad | Ido Tzuriel | "בואי נעזוב" | "שתיים בלילה" | 40 | 35 | 75 | Eliminated |
| 4 | Shlomi Shabat | Tzahi Halevi | "שירו של שפשף" | "את לי לילה" | 99 | 43 | 142 | Advanced |
| 4 | Shlomi Shabat | Yuval Dayan | "תמיד יחכו לך" | "את לי לילה" | 1 | 57 | 58 | Eliminated |

==== Episode 19: Before the Final ====
Episode before the Final.

==== Episode 20: Top 4 - The Final ====
- Group performance: Top 24 contestants exclude the finalists ("תתארו לכם");

===== Round 1 =====
| Order | Contestant | Song | Team |
|---|---|---|---|
| 1 | Raz Shmueli | "הדרכים הידועות" | Aviv Geffen |
| 2 | Chanan Ben Simon | "עטוף ברחמים" | Rami Kleinstein |
| 3 | Tzahi Halevi | "ברית עולם" | Shlomi Shabat |
| 4 | Kathleen Reiter | "Set Fire to the Rain" | Sarit Hadad |

===== Round 2 - Duets with the coaches =====
| Key | Contestant eliminated by the audience |

| Order | Contestant | Team/Duet | Song |
|---|---|---|---|
| 1 | Tzahi Halevi | Shlomi Shabat | "יש לך" |
| 2 | Chanan Ben Simon | Rami Kleinstein | "Goodbye Yellow Brick Road" |
| 3 | Kathleen Reiter | Sarit Hadad | "זה ששומר עליי" |
| 4 | Raz Shmueli | Aviv Geffen | "נוסטלגיה" |

===== Round 3 - The Original Song =====
| Key | Contestant Won The Competition |

| Order | Contestant | Song | Team |
|---|---|---|---|
| 1 | Raz Shmueli | "נלחמת באוויר" | Aviv Geffen |
| 2 | Kathleen Reiter | "צועקת לך" | Sarit Hadad |

==== Episode 21: Most Loveable Performances ====
| Order | Contestant/s | Song | Level | Coach choice |
|---|---|---|---|---|
| 1 | Yosef Buchnick | "נאחז באוויר" | Blind Auditions | Rami Kleinstein |
| 2 | Roee Edri | "Crazy" | Blind Auditions | Shlomi Shabat |
| 3 | Or Hamri | "כשאחר" | Blind Auditions | Sarit Hadad |
| 4 | Alon Shar & Lionel Faretein | "One Day in Your Life" | The Battles | Aviv Geffen |
| 5 | Meital Michaeli & Gilan Shahaf | "True Colors" | The Battles | Rami Kleinstein |
| 6 | Raz Shmueli | "מדוע לא באת" | Top 24 | Aviv Geffen |
| 7 | Or Eddie & Coral Bismuth | "אמא יקרה" | The Battles | Sarit Hadad |
| 8 | Tzahi Halevi | "Moves like Jagger" | Top 24 | Shlomi Shabat |
| 9 | Yahel & Guy | "Chasing Cars" | Top 24 | Aviv Geffen |
| 10 | Yuval Dayan | "שאריות של החיים" | Blind Auditions | Shlomi Shabat |
| 11 | Ido Tzuriel | "סוד המזלות" | Top 16 | Sarit Hadad |
| 12 | Chanan Ben Simon | "Paparazzi" | Top 24 | Rami Kleinstein |
| 13 | Sivan Talmor & Inbal Gershkovitz | "Imagine" | The Battles | Sarit Hadad |
| 14 | Kathleen Reiter & Aviva Dese | "Lady Marmalade" | The Battles | Rami Kleinstein |
| 15 | Sivan Talmor | "פמלה" | Top 24 | Shlomi Shabat |
| 16 | Kathleen Reiter | "Listen" | Top 24 | Aviv Geffen |
