= The Voice Israel season 4 =

The Voice Israel
- Season 4
- Hosted by: Michael Aloni; Shlomit Malka
- Coaches: Avraham Tal; Aviv Geffen; Shlomi Shabat; Miri Mesika

Release
- Original network: Channel 2 (Reshet)
- Original release: 8 December 2016 – 1 March 2017

The Voice Israel (Season 4) is the fourth & final season of the reality show The Voice Israel, which focuses on finding the next Israeli pop star. It is hosted by Michael Aloni and Shlomit Malka with coaches Shlomi Shabat, Miri Mesika, Aviv Geffen and Avraham Tal. Sapir Saban is the winner.
