= The Voice Israel =

Israeli reality television competition

- Hebrew: The Voice ישראל
- Created by: John de Mol; Roel van Velzen
- Presented by: Michael Aloni; Shlomit Malka
- Judges: Rami Kleinstein; Sarit Hadad; Aviv Geffen; Shlomi Shabat; Yuval Banai & Shlomi Bracha; Mosh Ben-Ari; Miri Mesika; Avraham Tal; Ivri Lider; Nasrin Kadri; Doron Medalie; Shlomi Shabat & Yuval Dayan; Noa Kirel; Eden Ben Zaken; Static; Idan Raichel
- Country of origin: Israel
- Original language: Hebrew
- No. of series: 6

Production
- Producers: Talpa Media Group & Constantin Entertainment Israel

Original release
- Network: Channel 2 (Reshet) (2012-2017); Reshet 13 (2018-present)
- Release: January 7, 2012 – September 23, 2019
- Release: July 8, 2026 – present

The Voice Israel (Hebrew: The Voice ישראל) is the Israeli version of The Voice of Holland. It is part of the international syndication The Voice based on the reality singing competition launched in the Netherlands, created by Dutch television producer John de Mol. The show's first two-season already ended, with the winner of the first season being the Canadian-born Kathleen Reiter, and the winner of the second season being Arab-Israeli Lina Makhoul. One of the important premises of the show is the quality of the singing talent. Four coaches, themselves popular performing artists, train the talents in their group and occasionally perform with them. Talents are selected in blind auditions, where the coaches cannot see, but only hear the auditioner.

== Overview ==
=== Format ===
The series consists of three phases: a blind audition, a battle phase, and live performance shows. Four judges/coaches, all noteworthy recording artists, choose teams of contestants through a blind audition process. Each judge has the length of the auditioner's performance (about one minute) to decide if he or she wants that singer on his or her team; if two or more judges want the same singer (as happens frequently), the singer has the final choice of coach. Each team of singers is mentored and developed by its respective coach. In the second stage, called the battle phase, coaches have two of their team members battle against each other directly by singing the same song together, with the coach choosing which team member to advance from each of four individual "battles" into the first live round. Within that first live round, the surviving acts from each team again compete head-to-head, with a combination of public and jury vote deciding who advances onto the next round. In the final phase, the remaining contestants (top 8) compete against each other in live broadcasts. The television audience and the coaches have equal say 50/50 in deciding who moves on to the final 4 phase. With one team member remaining for each coach, the (final 4) contestants compete against each other in the finale with the outcome decided solely by public vote.

=== Coaches and finalists ===
– Winning coach/contestant. Winners are in bold, eliminated contestants in small font.
– Runner-up coach/contestant. Final contestant first listed.
– 3rd Place coach/contestant. Final contestant first listed.
– 4th place coach/contestant. Final contestant first listed.

Season	Judges/Coaches			
Season	Shlomi Shabat	Aviv Geffen	Sarit Hadad	Rami Kleinstein
1	Tzachi Halevy; Yuval Dayan Gal Benjamin Roey Adri Topaz Abadang Maor Titon	Raz Shmueli; Lionel Faretein Dana Dor Yahel Doron & Guy Mantash Noa Golan Barel Sivan Talmor	**Kathleen Reiter**; Ido Tzuriel Or Chamri Or Eddie Loren De Paz Matan Shemer	Chanan Ben Simon; Or Cohen Gadi Altman Yoseph Buchnik Meital Michaeli Orit Shalom
Season	Shlomi Shabat	Aviv Geffen	Sarit Hadad	Yuval Banai and Shlomi Bracha
2	**Lina Makhoul**; Niv Mantzur Annaelle Valensi Yair Levi Or Ben Atar Adam Lahav	Ofir Ben Shitrit; Ronnie Perry Sahar Sharav May Cohen Yael Shoshana Cohen Manar Shehab	Dana Zalah; Ahtaliyah Pierce Misha Soukhinin Yehuda Mimran Hai Eilon Mazi Haliva	Rudi Bainesay; Dan Salomon Daniella Millo Assaf Gad Hanun Lusil Blekherman Mike Sela
Season	Shlomi Shabat	Aviv Geffen	Sarit Hadad	Mosh Ben-Ari
3	Yarden Peretz; Ruma Amar; Shirel Bitan; Liron Abargel; Lidor Vitzman; Shoval Amiel	Tamar Amar; Eyal Cohen; Ohad Rein; Arina Popova; Jessica Katz; Lenny Gomel	**Elkana Marziano**; Josh Perets; Tal Flora Levy; Kineret Hendeles; Eylon Hodefi; Yahav Elgrabli	Niv Demirel; Talia Londoner; Levly Goren; Denise Scorfits; Noy Eisen; Dar Dveksler & Orin Jacobson
Season	Avraham Tal	Aviv Geffen	Shlomi Shabat	Miri Mesika
4	Nitzan Sher; Shir Koren; Benaia Barabi	Eli Huli; Rita S Lior Naman	**Sapir Saban**; Lior Kakon; Ron Abdan	Joy Nag; Eva Halal; Sapir Amar
Season	Doron Medalie	Shlomi Shabat and Yuval Dayan	Ivri Lider	Nasrin Kadri
5	Sim Lopez; Ofir Atar; Yael Leor Shachar; Ohad Yehudai; Almor Ashkenazi	Maya Cohen; Sapir Aminov; Ofek Nahman; Elad Aharon; Sama Shoufani	**Amit Shauli**; Asaf Cohen; Afek Lamur; Roni Maimon; Liem Benisti	Daniel Jamal; Shira Zluf; Gabriel Shrem; Bat-El Yarimi; Sharon Dadush
Season	Static	Noa Kirel	Eden Ben Zaken	Idan Raichel
6	Tamir Seri; Avigail Saranga; Efrat Chen; Noya Arava	**Emma Ziza Cohen**; Naor Doani; Tomer Mizrachi; Gefen Lobel	Osher Cohen; Tair Amram Shmuel; Avichai Saida; Ofri Atias	Renana Hovav; Srulik Elisha; Mai Meler; Eden Hana Shoval
Season	Static	Noa Kirel	Eden Ben Zaken	Idan Raichel
All Stars	Yali Akunis; Shar-El (Israel Pinchas); Danidin (Roni Levi); Ido Mosseri; Boomerang (Netanel Rodnitski)	Shorty (Hila Nissimov); Maya Avraham; Emily Kuper; Daniel Grant; Miki (Michal Muchtar)	**Daniel Barzilay**; Mika Tsur; Dana Lappidot; Adi Alon; Idan Alterman	Loai Ali; Jacko Eisenberg; Noy Fadlon; David Shaul; Osher Biton

=== Line-up of coaches ===
Coaches' line-up by chairs order
Season	Year	Coaches			
Season	Year	1	2	3	4
1	2012	Shlomi	Aviv	Sarit	Rami
2	2012-2013	Shlomi	Aviv	Sarit	Yuval & Shlomi
3	2014	Shlomi	Aviv	Sarit	Mosh
4	2016-2017	Avraham	Aviv	Shlomi	Miri
5	2019	Doron	Shlomi & Yuval	Ivri	Nasrin
6	2026	Static	Noa	Eden	Idan

== Series overview ==
Warning: the following table presents a significant amount of different colors.

Teams color key
Artist from Team Sarit	Artist from Team Avraham	Artist from Team Noa
Artist from Team Aviv	Artist from Team Miri	Artist from Team Idan
Artist from Team Shlomi S.	Artist from Team Ivri	Artist from Team Eden
Artist from Team Rami	Artist from Team Nasrin	Artist from Team Static
Artist from Team Yuval B. & Shlomi B.	Artist from Team Shlomi S. & Yuval D.
Artist from Team Mosh	Artist from Team Doron

Season	Aired	Winner	Runner-up	Third place	Fourth place	Winning coach	Host(s)
1	2012	Kathleen Reiter	Raz Shmueli	Tzachi Halevi	Chanan Simon	Sarit Hadad	Michael Aloni
2	2012-2013	Lina Makhul	Ofir Ben Shitrit	Dana Zalah	Rudi Bainesay	Shlomi Shabat	Michael Aloni
3	2014	Elkana Marziano	Tamar Amar	Eyal Cohen	Niv Demirel	Sarit Hadad	Michael Aloni
4	2016-2017	Sapir Saban	Nitzan Sher	Joy Nag	Eli Huli	Shlomi Shabat	Michael Aloni
5	2019	Amit Shauli	Daniel Jamal	Maya Cohen	Sim Lopez	Ivri Lider	Michael Aloni
6	2026	Emma Ziza Cohen	Renana Hovav	Osher Cohen	Tamir Seri	Noa Kirel	Michael Aloni

== All Stars version ==
The Voice All Stars Israel was announced directly after the finale of the sixth season of the main show. It is a celebrity-focused spin-off of the popular singing competition, and premiered on Reshet 13. Unlike traditional "All Stars" formats that feature past contestants, this particular season features actors, media personalities, and famous musicians auditioning blindly in the format of the show. Season six coaches Static, Noa Kirel, Eden Ben Zaken, and Idan Raichel are featured as coaches on the spin-off.

The Voice All Stars series overview
Season	Aired	Winner	Runner-up	Third place	Fourth place	Winning coach	Presenter	Coaches (chairs' order)			
Season	Aired	Winner	Runner-up	Third place	Fourth place	Winning coach	Presenter	1	2	3	4
1	2026	Daniel Barzilay	Yali Akunis	Shorty (Hila Nissimov)	Loai Ali	Eden Ben Zaken	Michael Aloni	Static	Noa	Eden	Idan

== See also ==
- The Voice (TV series)
- Music of Israel
- Television in Israel
