= Aderet =

Aderet can refer to:

- Aderet, Israel, moshav in central Israel
- Yeshivat Aderet Eliyahu, Haredi, Lithuanian yeshiva
- Aderet (singer), Israeli entertainer
- Eliyahu David Rabinowitz-Teomim (1845–1905), also known by his acronym ADeReT, Lithuanian rabbi
- Shlomo ben Aderet (1235–1310), Medieval rabbi, halakhist, and Talmudist
