= The Voice Israel season 6 =

The Voice Israel
- Season 6
- Hosted by: Michael Aloni
- Coaches: Static; Noa Kirel; Eden Ben Zaken; Idan Raichel

Release
- Original network: Reshet 13
- Original release: 8 July 2026 – present

The sixth season of The Voice Israel (Hebrew: 6 דה וויס ישראל or The Voice ישראל עונה 6) is the sixth edition of the Israeli talent show based on the original Dutch format The Voice of Holland. The program premiered on July 8, 2026, and marked the return of the franchise to the programming schedule of the Reshet 13 channel, after a hiatus of approximately seven years since the end of the fifth season.

== Coaches and host ==
Coaches and Host of The Voice Israel Season 6

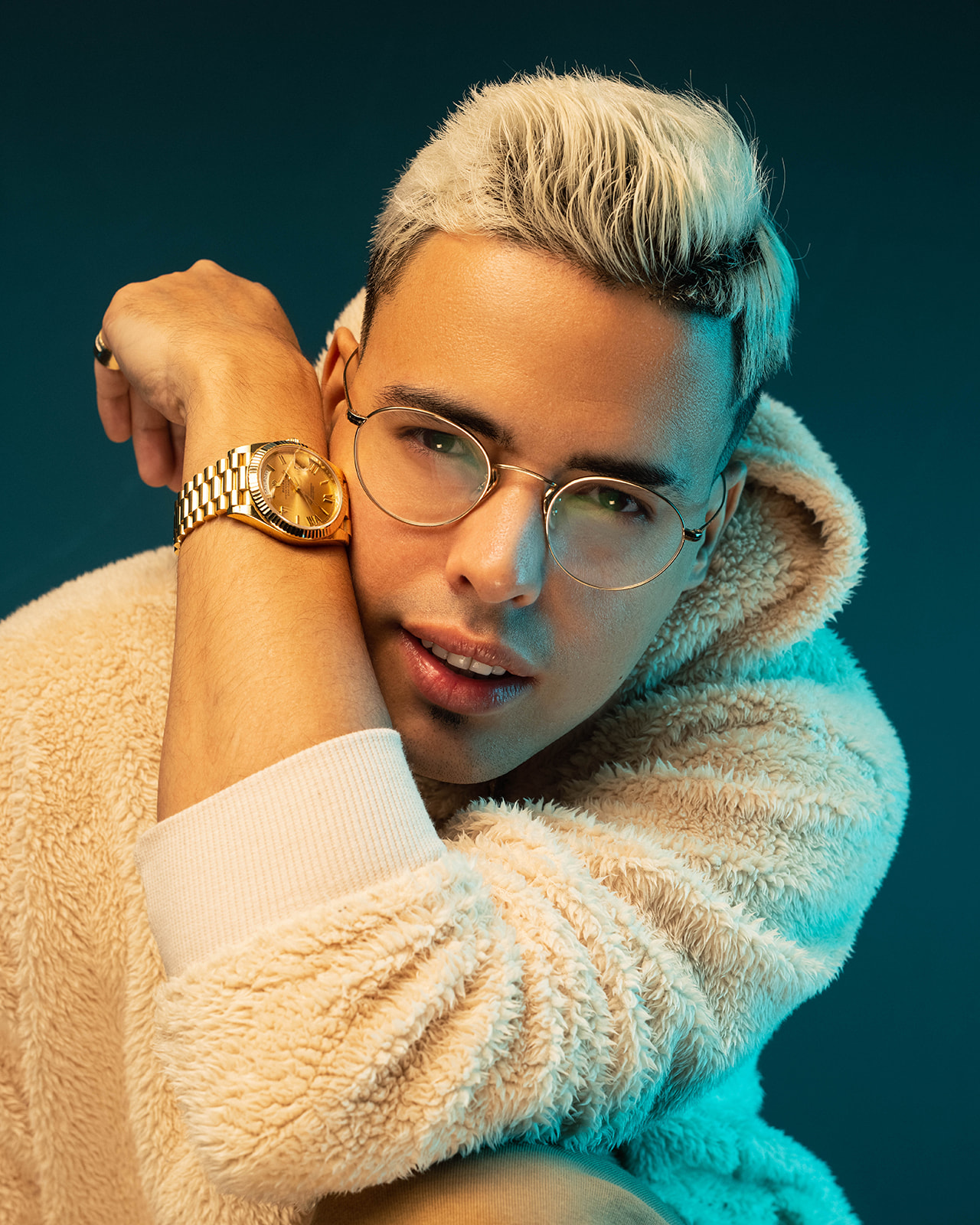
Static

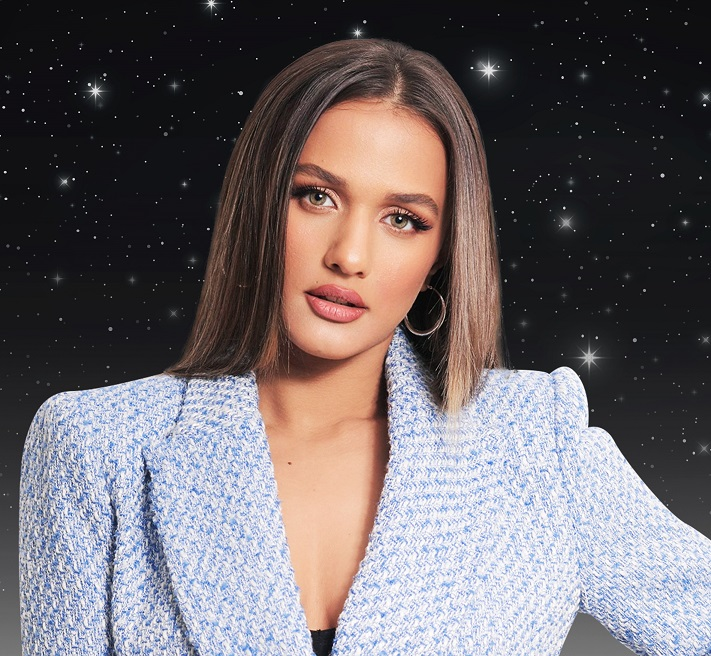
Eden Ben Zaken

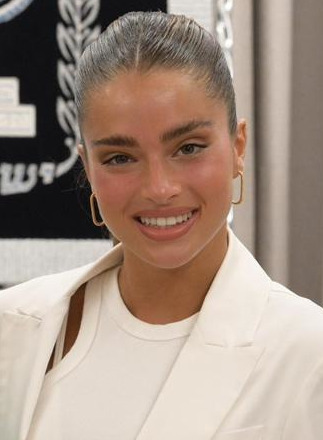
Noa Kirel

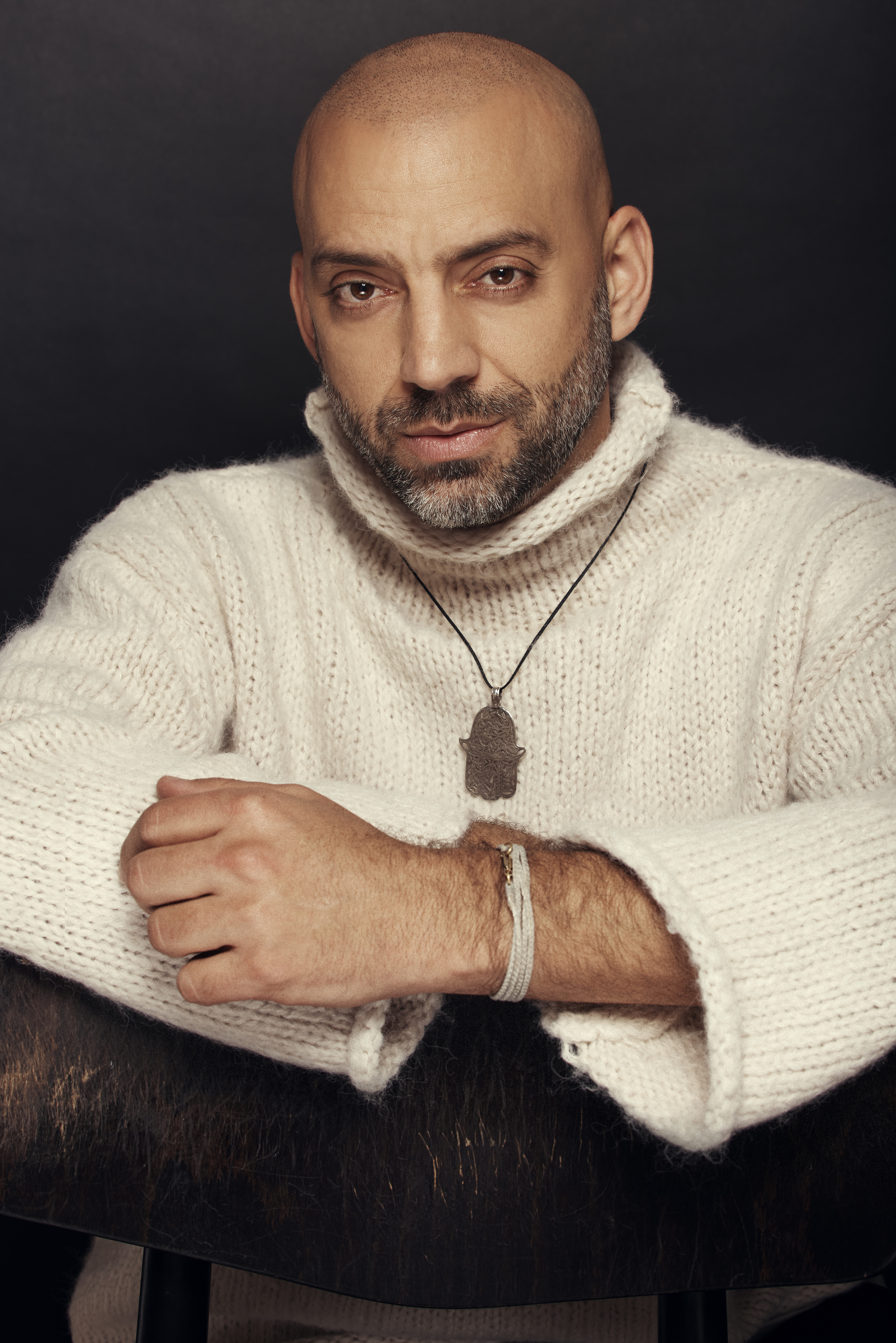
Idan Raichel

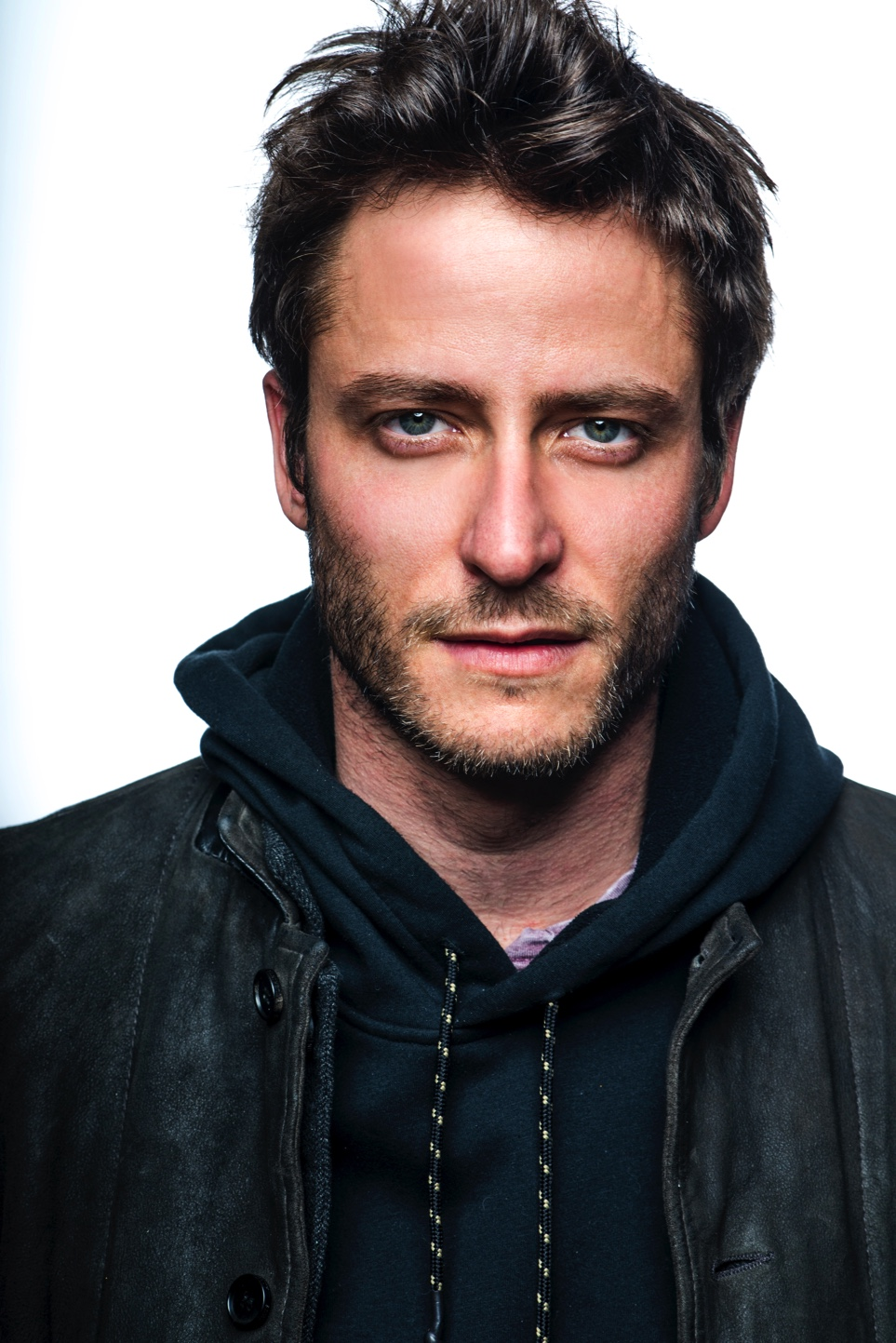
Michael Aloni

The season brought a complete overhaul of the judging panel, introducing four new coaches: singer-songwriters Idan Raichel, Eden Ben Zaken, and Noa Kirel, and pop/hip-hop artist Static. Additionally, Michael Aloni returns as host.

== Teams ==
- Winner
- Runner-up
- Third place
- Fourth place
- Eliminated in the Finale
- Eliminated in the Semi-final
- Eliminated in the Knockouts
- Stolen in the Battles
- Eliminated in the Battles

Coaches	Top 72 Artists
Static	
Noa Kirel	
Eden Ben Zaken	
Idan Raichel	
Note: Italicized names are stolen artists (names scratched through within former teams).

== Blind Auditions ==
The Blind Auditions follow strict rules based on the show's international format. The coaches remain facing away from the stage throughout the performance, evaluating contestants solely on vocal quality, without any visual influence. To secure a participant for their team, a coach must press the "I Want You" button before the performance ends, causing their chair to turn toward the stage. The contestant's fate depends on the number of chairs that turn. If only one coach shows interest, the participant automatically joins that team. If multiple coaches turn their chairs, the decision-making power shifts to the contestant, who must choose which mentor to join.

Each coach has a limited number of spots, needing to select exactly 18 voices to complete their team, bringing the total number of successful contestants to 56 by the end of the phase. The format also features the "Block" button, a strategic tool available on the coaches' control panels. Each coach has the right to block a rival once during the entire audition phase. The block must be activated proactively and prevents the rival coach from recruiting that round's contestant, even if they also decide to turn their chair.

Blind auditions color key
✔	Coach pressed their "I WANT YOU" button
	Artist selected a coach's team
	Artist defaulted to a coach's team
	Artist was eliminated
	Artist was originally eliminated, but a coach pressed the "replay"
✘	Coach pressed their "I WANT YOU" button, but was blocked by another coach from getting the artist
	Blocked by Static; Blocked by Eden; Blocked by Noa; Blocked by Idan

Blind auditions result
Episode	Order	Artist	Age	Hometown	Song	Coach's and artist's choices			
Episode	Order	Artist	Age	Hometown	Song	Static	Noa	Eden	Idan
Episode 1 (8 July)	1	Noya Arava	24	Yehud	"Vampire"	✔	✔	✔	✔
Episode 1 (8 July)	2	Elisheva Greenfield	28	Jerusalem	"Ex's & Oh's"	✔	✔	✔	✔
Episode 1 (8 July)	3	Gabriel Putznik	37	Ra'anana	scharchoret"	—	—	—	—
Episode 1 (8 July)	4	Renana Hovav	22	Bnei Ayish	nikch lenu yum	✔	✔	✔	✔
Episode 1 (8 July)	5	Itay Zohar	25	Erez	"meh am nitnashek"	—	✔	—	—
Episode 2 (11 July)	1	Ariela Baruh	28	Ramat Gan	"Mishuga"	✔	—	—	✔
Episode 2 (11 July)	2	Cheyenne Gillen	21	Kokhav Michael	"Alone Again (Naturally)"	✔	✔	✔	—
Episode 2 (11 July)	3	Itay Kahan	33	Tel Aviv	"am ata gvar"	—	—	—	—
Episode 2 (11 July)	4	Abia Cohen	16	Jerusalem	"Out Here on My Own"	—	✔	—	✔
Episode 2 (11 July)	5	Tamar Shawki	37	Givatayim	"Habbaytak Bessayf"	—	✔	—	—
Episode 2 (11 July)	6	Naor Doani	27	Nahariya	"Lovely"	—	✔	✘	✔
