= Elkana Marziano =

Israeli singer

- Born: Hadera
- Genres: Pop; R&B; Alternative R&B
- Occupation: Singer
- Years active: 2014-present

Elkana Marziano (Hebrew: אלקנה מרציאנו) is an Israeli singer of Moroccan-Jewish ancestry. He was the winner of season 3 of The Voice Israel.

== Collaborations ==
Marziano is known for his collaborations with international Arab artists, often stirring controversy:

In February 2021, he released "J'en ai marre" alongside Moroccan singer Sanaa Mohamed, sung in both Hebrew and Arabic. Mohamed subsequently received death threats and had to cancel interviews with Israeli channels. Marziano responded by stressing his Moroccan roots, as well as the values of peace and coexistence, and stating his dream is to sing for the Moroccan king.

In September 2020, Emirati singer Walid Al Jassim released "Ahlan Beik" (Hello You) featuring Elkana Martziano, celebrating the signing of the Abraham Accords. The track, sung in Hebrew, Arabic and English, was written by Israeli hit-makers Doron Medalie and Henree and conveys a message of peace between the two countries. The music video was shot in both Israel and in Dubai and garnered over a million views on YouTube. The duet received praise in Israel, but was widely criticized in the Emirates.

== Politics ==
In December 2023, Marziano was identified in a New Arab article as participating in "Israeli war effort co-opting [...] at the moment", reflecting "Israel's military-pop complex", for singing a "lazy rework" version of Dammi Falastini (My Blood is Palestinian) by Mohammed Assaf with its lyrics replaced with "My blood is Jewish".
