= Moran Mazor =

Israeli singer (born 1991)

Moran Mazor מורן מזור
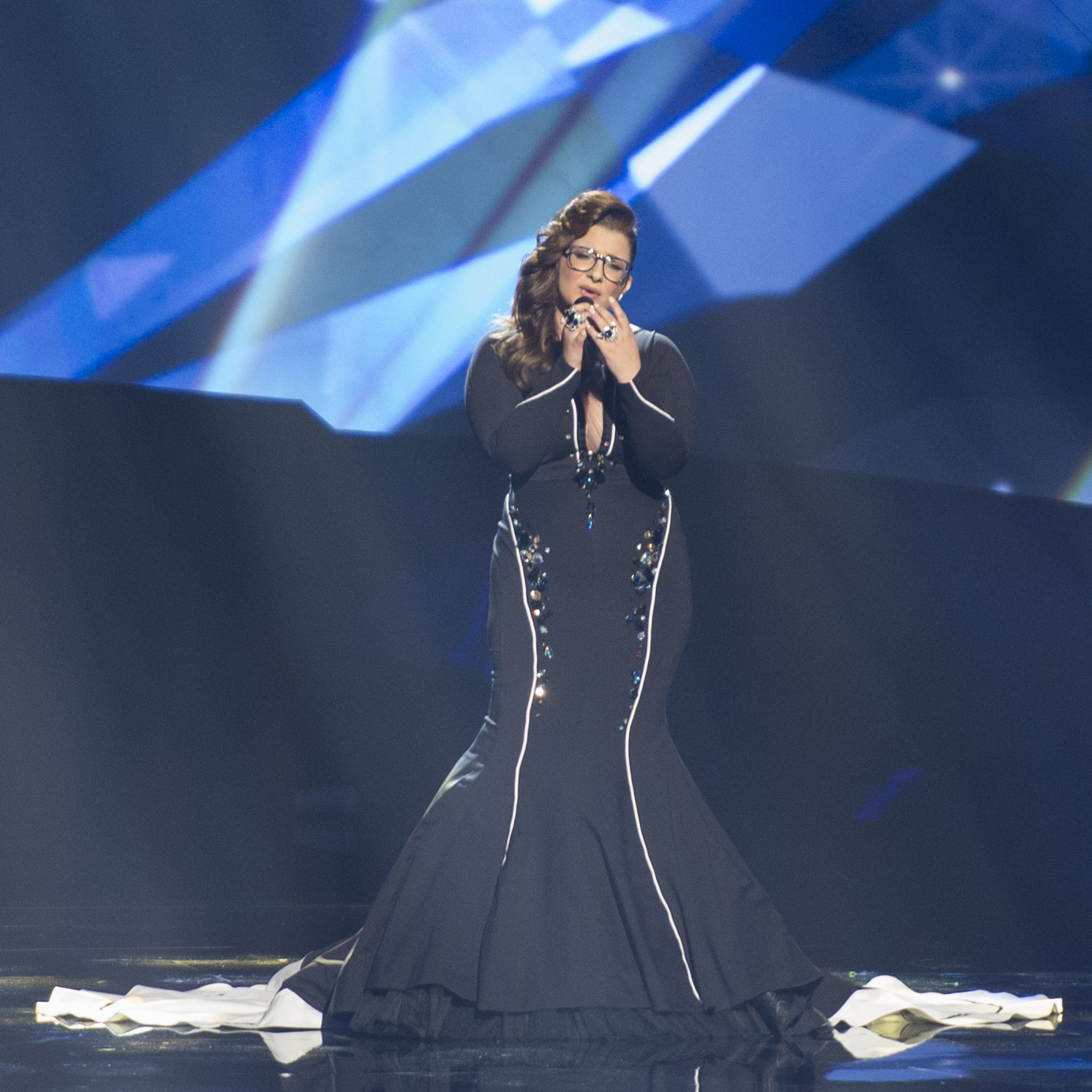
- Moran Mazor at Eurovision 2013

Background information
- Born: 17 May 1991 (age 34); Holon, Israel
- Genres: World, Pop, Mizrahi music
- Occupation: Singer-songwriter
- Instrument: Vocals
- Years active: 2011–present

Moran Mazor (Hebrew: מורן מזור; born 17 May 1991) is an Israeli singer. Mazor rose to fame as the winner of the first series of the Israeli reality show "Eyal Golan is Calling You" in 2011.

In 2013, Mazor won the Israeli national selection Kdam Eurovision 2013. She represented her country in the second semi-final of the Eurovision Song Contest 2013 in Malmö, Sweden, with the song "Rak bishvilo" (Only for him). The song failed to qualify for the final, placing 14th in the semi-final and scoring 40 points. In October 2013, the Israel Broadcasting Authority released a documentary about Moran's journey through Eurovision entitled "A Girl with Glasses."

== Early life ==
Moran was born in Holon to a family of Georgian Jewish descent, who migrated to Israel from Georgia in the early 1970s.

Awards and achievements
Preceded by Izabo with "Time"	Israel in the Eurovision Song Contest; 2013	Succeeded by Mei Finegold with "Same Heart"
