= Yuval Dayan =

Israeli singer, songwriter, and composer

- יובל דיין
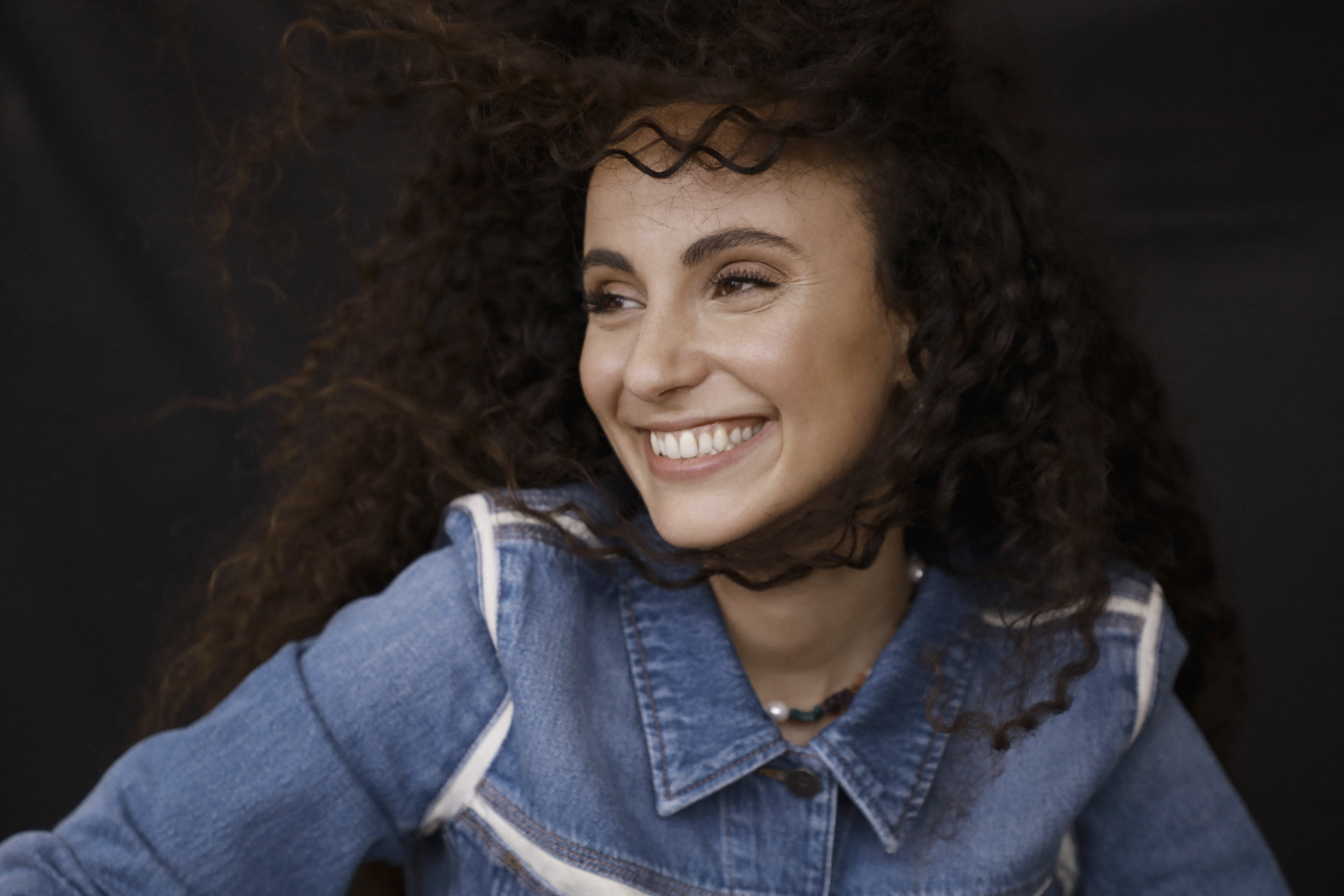
- Born: December 28, 1994 (age 31); Ashdod, Israel
- Occupation: Singer
- Musical career
- Genres: World; pop; mizrahi
- Label: A.M Music Productions LTD

Yuval Dayan (Hebrew: יובל דיין) born December 28, 1994) is an Israeli singer, songwriter, and composer.

== Early and personal life ==
Dayan was born and raised in Ashdod, Israel, to a traditional family of Moroccan Jewish descent. Since childhood she has been singing, playing and performing.

In 2013, She was enlisted to the Israel Defense Forces (IDF), and served in the military band of the Education and Youth Corps Entertainment Troupe.

Since 2016, Dayan has become increasingly religiously observant. Back then she has stated that even before that, she used to attend synagogue every Friday, as well as observes the Shabbat. She resides in Ramat HaSharon, Israel.

== Music career ==
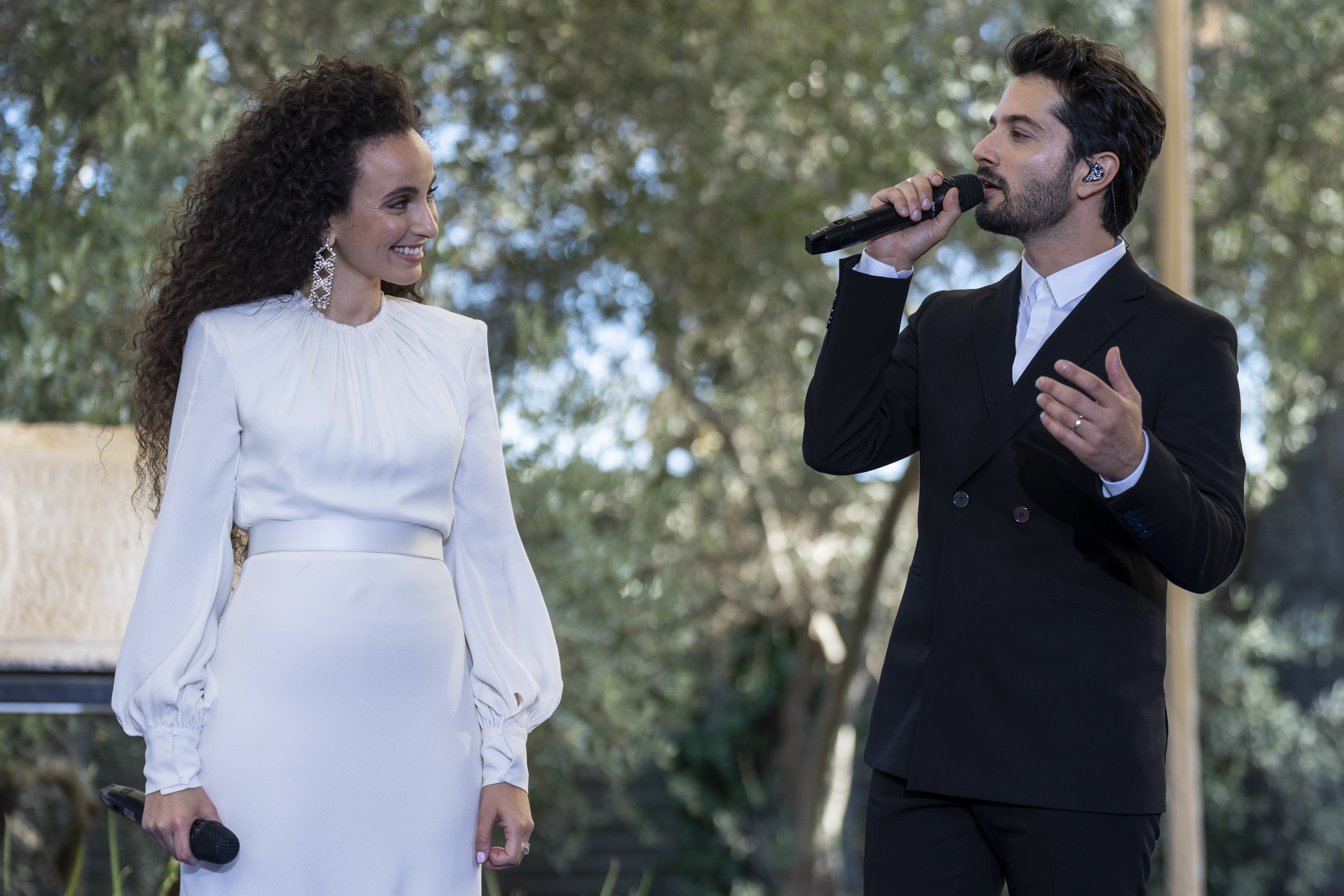
Dayan and Ran Danker sing a mash-up of “Let it Be” and an Israeli song called “Lu Yehi”.

In 2012 she participated in The Voice Israel (Season 1) coached by Shlomi Shabat. She sang the song "She'eriot Shel HaChaim" (Scraps of Life). She advanced to the semi-finals, but unexpectedly announced during the live broadcast that she had decided to bow out of the competition.

In February 2013 her first single from her first album Le'esof (Hebrew: "לאסוף") was released, and succeeded with more than three million views on YouTube. Her second single from the album "Ad Shetachzor" (Hebrew: עד שתחזור)" was released in May 2013. In October 2013 her third single, "Al Tomar", (Hebrew: אל תאמר) written by Dudu Tassa, was released.

The second album Libi Er (Hebrew: ליבי ער) was released in 2016.

On July 14, 2022, she performed the song "Lu Yehi" at Beit HaNassi, alongside the singer Ran Danker, in front of the President of the United States, Joe Biden, during his visit to Israel.

== Discography ==
Le'esof (2013) Libi Er (2016) Nigonim (2024) Tishari At (2024)
