= Benaia Barabi =

Israeli singer and musician (born 1989)

Benaia Barabi בניה ברבי
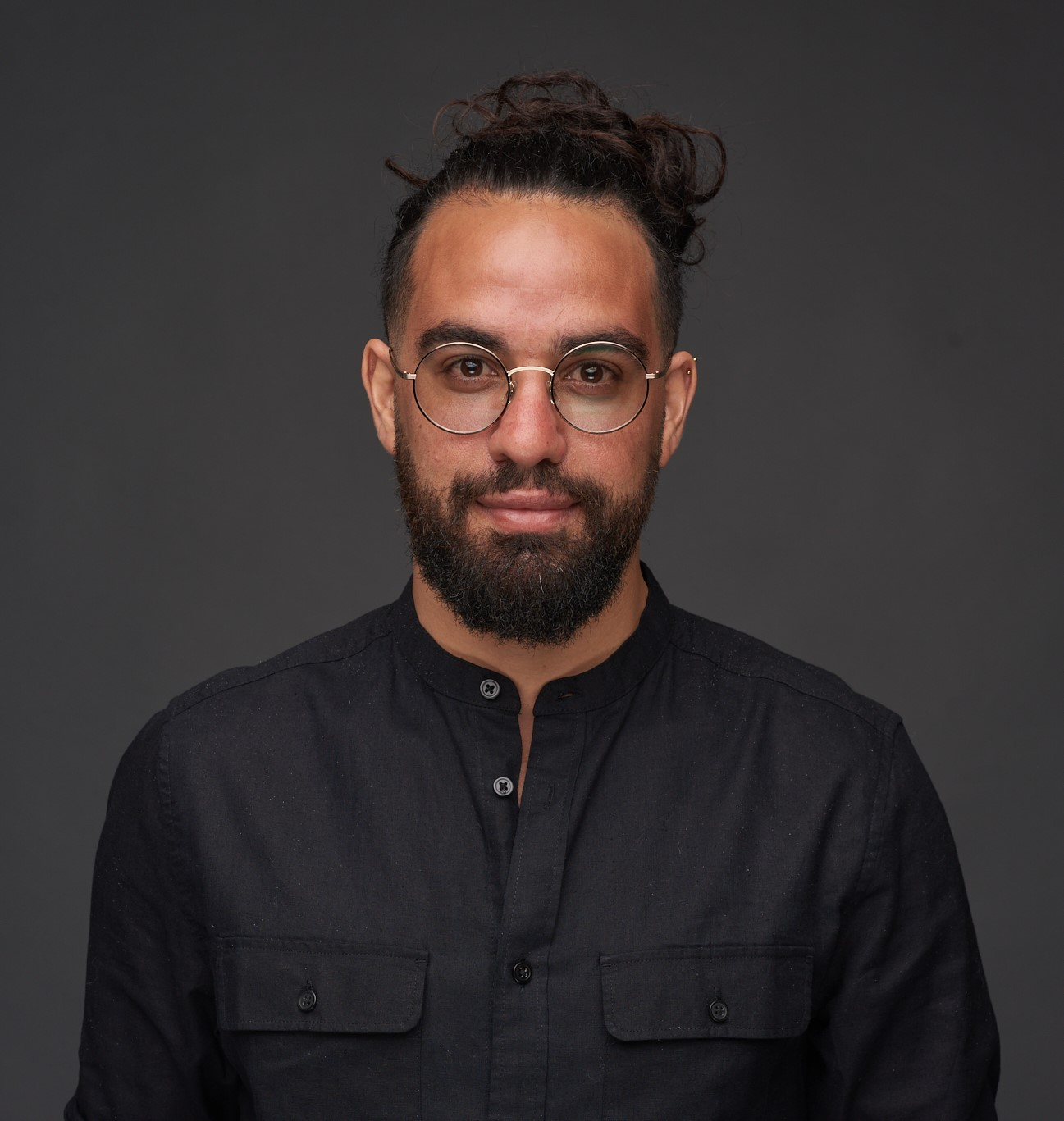
- Benaia Barabi, 2021

Background information
- Born: 4 April 1989 (age 37); Tiberias, Israel
- Genres: Mizrahi; World music Pop; Rock
- Instrument: Guitar
- Years active: 2015–present
- Website: benaiabarabi.com

Benaia Barabi (Hebrew: בניה ברבי; born 4 April 1989) is an Israeli singer, songwriter, composer and musician. Barabi has collaborated with many well-known Israeli musicians and artists and was declared as "Discovery of the Year" for 2019 by ACUM.

== Biography ==
Benaia Barabi was born in Tiberias where he learned to play the saxophone, guitar and organ at the local conservatorium. He played and performed with the city band and at school events.

In the army, Barabi served as an officer in the Military Police. After his discharge from the army, he studied at the "Rimon" Music School where he took part in special projects such as "Me and the Other" which was a collaboration of musicians and the physically challenged. He was chosen as the audience favorite during a school singing event and was recognized as "Song of the Week" by Israel's Reshet Gimel radio station.

Barabi took part in the "Going on Air" project with Israel's Galei Zahal radio station with Yoav Kutner and Rimon's ensemble. There he collaborated with artists such as Ehud Banai, Dudu Tassa, Amir Benayoun, Idan Reichel, Lea Shabat and more.

His debut album "Parts of the Melody" (Hebrew: חלקים מהניגון) was launched at the Piano Festival and produced 3 singles "Faith" (Hebrew: אמונה), "From the Village to the City" (Hebrew: מהכפר אל העיר) and "Strings of the Heart" (Hebrew: מיתרי הלב).

In 2016, Barabi participated in the fourth season of "The Voice Israel" where he was mentored by Avraham Tal. He was eliminated during the live performance stage.

On 11 July 2017, he released the song "Don't Ask" (Hebrew: אל תשאלי | Al Tishali) together with Gil Vain.

On 12 March 2018, he released the song "Someone Here With Me" (Hebrew: מישהו איתי כאן | Mishehu Iti Kan) which he co-wrote and composed together with Eliad Nachum and Dudi Bar David. These two songs reached 11 and 14 places respectively in the yearly charts of Galgalatz and Ynet.

On 7 October 2018, Barabi released the song "You Caught a Place for Me" (Hebrew: תפסת לי מקום | Tafsta Li Makom) which went to number one on the Galgalatz chart for seven weeks in a row.

On 11 April 2019, Barabi collaborated with Eyal Golan in the song "What Are You Afraid Of" (Hebrew: ממה את מפחדת),

In May 2019, Barabi took part in the torch lighting ceremony on Mount Herzl during Israel's 71st Independence Day.

On 12 June 2019, Barabi was recognized as "Discovery of the Year" by ACUM.

== Personal life ==
Barabi resides in Tel Mond. In the past he used to reside in Kfar Haroeh.

== Discography ==
=== Studio albums ===
2015: Parts of the Melody

2019: Someone Here With Me
