= Super Light =

Studio album by Izabo
- Released: 3 July 2008
- Genres: Indie rock, Disco, Middle Eastern music
- Length: 44:00
- Label: Labeleh
- Producer: Ran Shem Tov

Izabo chronology
Fun Makers (2003)	Super Light (2008)

Super Light is the second album by the Israeli rock band Izabo, released in 3 July 2008.

== Track listing ==
All tracks are written by Ran Shem Tov.

No.	Title	Length
1.	"Slow Disco"	3:25
2.	"Tomorrow"	3:50
3.	"Confusion"	3:41
4.	"Blind"	4:30
5.	"Boom Boom Boom"	3:17
6.	"Shawarma Hunters"	3:06
7.	"Are We Good"	5:00
8.	"Super Light"	3:52
9.	"Could Be Wrong"	3:35
10.	"Top of the Line"	2:54
11.	"Only Only"	5:02
12.	"Star"	3:26
Total length:		44:00

== Personnel ==
- Ran Shem Tov: lead guitar, lead vocals
- Jonathan Levy: bass
- Shiri Hadar: keyboards
- Nir Mantzur: drums
