= Shotei Hanevuah =

Musical group

Shotey Hanevua שוטי הנבואה
- Origin: Metula, Israel
- Genres: dub; hip-hop; dance music
- Years active: 1994–2007
- Labels: Helicon Records
- Past members: Roi Levi; Gilad Vital; Assaf Givati; Avraham Tal; Idan Carmely; Amit Carmely

Shotei Ha'nevua (Hebrew: שוטי הנבואה), or The Fools of Prophecy, was an Israeli musical group selected as Israel's "Band of the Year" in 2005. The band described its music as a fusion of dub with hip-hop and dance music, with an eastern Mediterranean flavor. The band toured the United States in 2005, performing at major colleges and universities.

== History ==
The band's founders Roi Levi and Gilad Vital – childhood friends from Metulla, started their musical activity under the name "Shotey Hanevua" (The Fools of Prophecy) in 1994. During 1995 they recorded two singles and performed in small clubs in Tel-Aviv. In 1996 they recorded five demos produced of original songs by Amit Carmely. These recordings were sent to different Israeli record companies but went unnoticed.

In 1998, Amit Carmely officially joined the band as bass guitarist changing his status from an external musical producer to a full band member. Soon afterwards the band was completed with the addition of Assaf Givati (on guitar), Avraham Tal (on vocals) and Amit's younger brother Idan (on drums). With the full line-up, the "Fools" began working on their debut album, in DB studios in Tel Aviv, whilst performing extensively throughout Israel, establishing a solid fan-base.

In 1999, with the album almost complete, they signed a recording contract with Helicon Records- one of Israel's leading record companies. The album was completed few months later. During the summer of '99 the band appeared at two of Israel's big music festivals, "Shantipi" and "Bereshit". The album, which included the hit songs "Ain Ani", "Fanan", Ma Kara Lach" and "Kol Hayeladim Koftzim Rockdim" was released in 2000. The songs on the album dealt with faith, peace and love – as well as the occasional political message such as these lines from the song "Prilli": "Nobody here is going to leave, so start loving" or: "Palestinian Arab, Argentinian Jew it doesn't matter they are all human beings". The album was very successful, reaching Israeli "Platinum" and sold more than 40,000 copies.

In April 2004 the band released its second album "Mehapsim et Dorot" (Looking for Generations ) which "went gold" selling more than 20,000 copies. The album Hit song was "Yedia" (Knowledge) written and composed by Roi Levi. Other well known songs from the "Dorot" album were "Kol Galgal" (Voice of a Wheel) based on words from the holy book of "Zohar" –and "Mi" (Who), both composed by Avraham Tal. In 2005 the band collaborated with Izabo, another Israeli band which resulted in the song "הוא" (Hu)(Him), which won the A.M.I award for "Israel's best song of the Year".

Shotei Hanevua broke up on August 12, 2007. Singer Avraham Tal started a solo career. Meanwhile, the majority of the band continued to play together under the new name "Pshutei Ha'am" or as literally translated from Hebrew "The Simple People". On December 13, 2024, Gilad Vital was killed in a motorcycle accident.

== Discography ==
=== Studio albums ===
- 2000 Shotei Hanevua (Helicon)
- 2004 Mechapsim Et Dorot (Helicon)

=== Collaborations ===
- 2006 Hu (with Izabo), 2nd-place winner of the 2006 Music 24 Song of the Year award.
