= The Fun Makers =

Studio album by Izabo
- Released: 9 December 2003
- Genres: Indie rock, Disco, Middle Eastern music
- Length: 54:00
- Label: Labeleh
- Producer: Ran Shem Tov

Izabo chronology
The Fun Makers (2003)	Super Light (2008)

The Fun Makers is the debut album by the Israeli rock band, Izabo, released in 9 December 2003.

== Track listing ==
All tracks are written by Ran Shem Tov.

No.	Title	Length
1.	"Morning Hero"	3:21
2.	"I'm On You"	4:24
3.	"Kisses"	3:21
4.	"Fun Makers"	3:22
5.	"Play With Me"	5:13
6.	"Sky"	5:41
7.	"Cook Me"	3:40
8.	"Flower Power"	6:20
9.	"Tide And Sea"	3:38
10.	"Onion Tears"	4:23
11.	"Undo Song"	4:18
12.	"Dream On"	6:33
Total length:		54:00

== Personnel ==
- Ran Shem Tov: lead guitar, lead vocals
- Jonathan Levy: bass
- Shiri Hadar: keyboards
- Nir Mantzur: drums
