= Cherie and Renno =

Israeli music duo

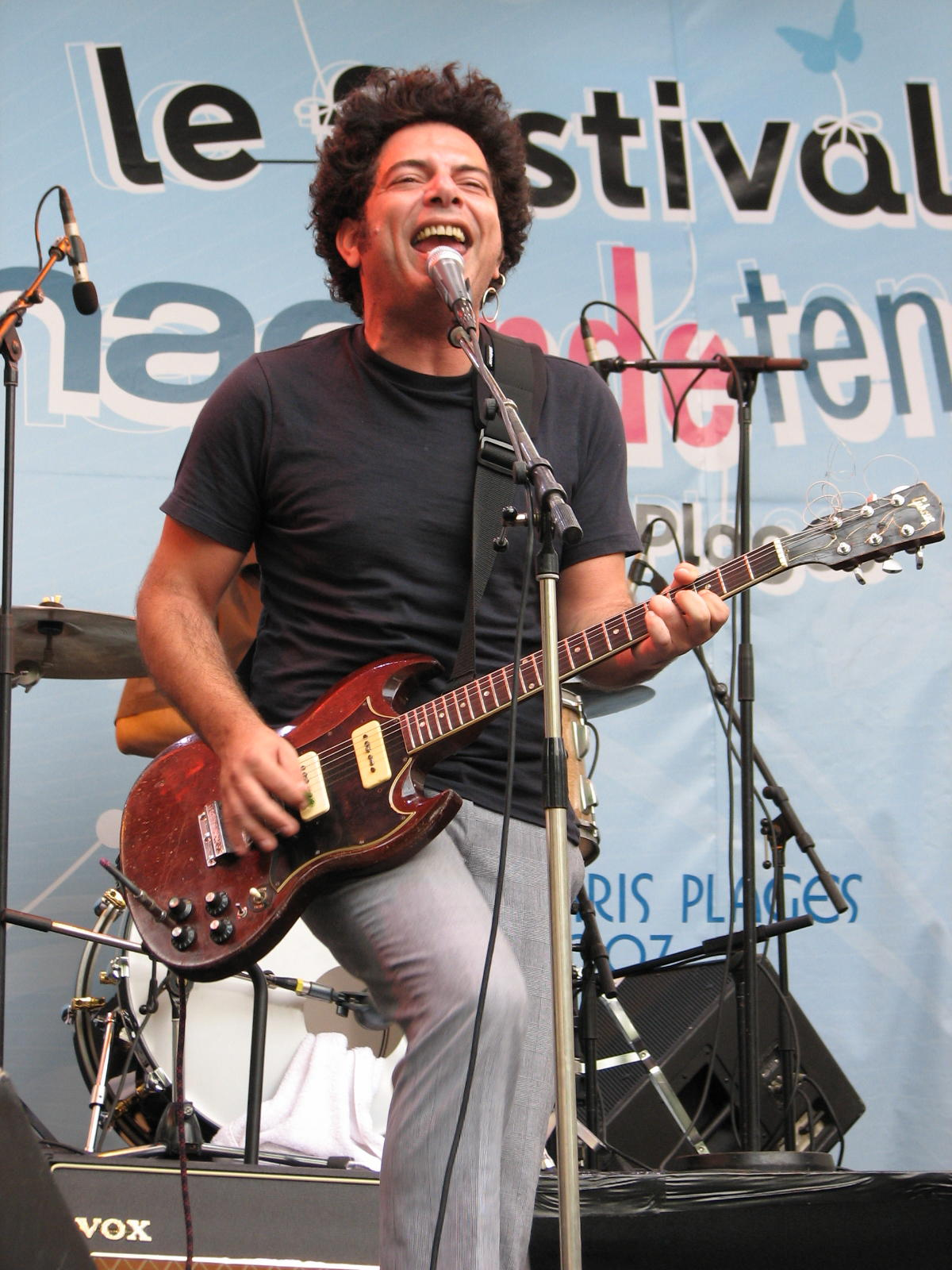
- Ran Shem-Tov, lead singer and guitarist of Cherie and Renno, in concert with Izabo in Paris, August 18, 2007

Background information
- Also known as: Izabo (1989-2016)
- Origin: Petah Tikva, Israel
- Genres: Indie rock Psychedelic rock Disco; Punk; Middle Eastern music Neo-psychedelia
- Years active: 1989–present
- Labels: Labeleh; 100% Records; Anova Music
- Members: Ran Shem Tov; Shiri Hadar
- Past members: Nir Graf (1989 - 1994); Amos Fridman (1994 - 1997); Tamir Muskat (1989 - 1997); Jonathan Levy (1997-2016); Nir Mantzur (1997-2016)
- Website: Izabo.net CherieAndRenno.com

Cherie and Renno, formerly known as Izabo (Hebrew: איזבו), are an Israeli duo that was formed in 1989. Their musical style is diverse, ranging from indie rock, disco and Middle Eastern music. Under the name Izabo, they represented Israel at the Eurovision Song Contest 2012, with the song "Time".

== Biography ==
Izabo was founded in Petah Tikva in 1989. Their original line-up consisted of Ran Shem Tov, Shiri Hadar, Nir Graf and Tamir Muskat.

In 1994, they released their first album titled Movie Maker along with three singles. This album is often omitted from Izabo's chronology and songs from it are never played in live concerts. The band's line-up changed following the release of the album and again in 1997, with the final line-up, which remained for 19 years, consisting of founders Shem Tov and Hadar, as well as Jonathan Levy and Nir Mantzur.

Their sophomore album, The Fun Makers, was released in late 2003 and received highly positive critical acclaim, with the songs "Morning Hero" and "Cook Me" achieving major radio success in Israel. Several months later, Izabo signed on to Sony BMG, through which they released their British debut, The Morning Hero EP. The release was accompanied by a concert tour during which Izabo performed in England, Scotland and the Netherlands.

Izabo collaborated with a large variety of artists, on stage and in studio, from singer-songwriter Ahuva Ozeri to choreographer Ohad Naharin.

Izabo's collaboration with Shotei Hanevuah produced the single "Hu", which won the Music 24's "song of the year" award.

Their third LP, Super Light, was released in July 2008.

On March 26, 2012, Izabo released an EP titled Summer Shade. The EP included the 2012 singles "Summer Shade", "On My Way" and "I Like It", the band's final singles under the name Izabo.

In early February it was revealed that Izabo had been chosen by a group of mass communications and music industry experts to represent Israel in the Eurovision Song Contest 2012 in Baku, Azerbaijan. The song, Time, has verses in English and choruses in Hebrew. They did not progress past the semi-final round.

On the May 21, 2012, they released the album Life Is on My Side in the UK, through 100% Records.

In 2016, Nir Mantzur and Jonathan Levy left the band, and the band changed its name to Cherie and Renno.

Two years later, Cherie and Renno released a self-titled album. The album is Cherie and Renno's first album, and the fifth in the band's history.

== Discography ==
=== Albums ===
As Izabo:

- Movie Maker (1994)
- The Fun Makers (2003)
- Super Light (2008)
- Life Is On My Side (2012)

As Cherie and Renno:

- Cherie and Renno (2018)

=== Singles ===
As Izabo:

- "Beady" (1993)
- "Here She Comes" (1993)
- "Movie Maker" (1993)
- "Morning Hero" (2004)
- "Tomorrow" (2008)
- "Slow Disco" (2008)
- "Slow Disco (T.B.S. Remix)" (2009)
- "Summer Shade" (2012)
- "On My Way" (2012)
- "Time" (2012)
- "I Like It" (2012)

As Cherie and Renno:

- "MEOW!" (2017)
- "Let Me In" (2018)
- "Space" (2018)
- "Summer Smile" (2019)

=== Music videos ===
- "Morning Hero" (2004)
- "Play with Me" (2004)
- "Cook Me" (2004)
- "Shawarma Hunters" (2008)
- "Slow Disco" (2009)
- "On My Way" (2010)
- "Summer Shade" (2011)
- "I Like It" (2012)
- "Time" (2012)

Awards and achievements
Preceded by Dana International with "Ding Dong"	Israel in the Eurovision Song Contest; 2012	Succeeded by Moran Mazor with "Rak bishvilo"
