= Avraham Tal =

Israeli musician

Avraham Tal אברהם טל
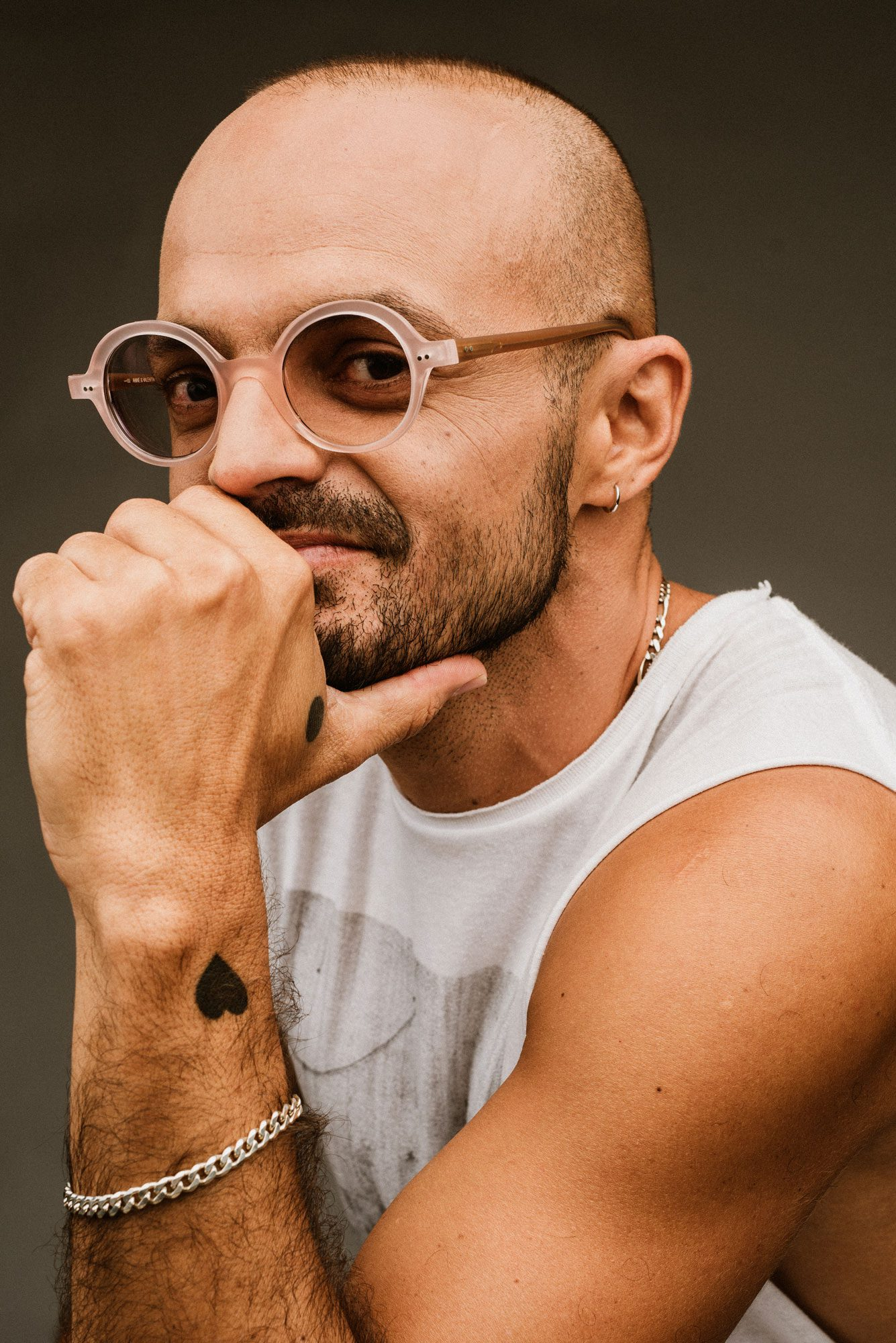
- Avraham Tal

Background information
- Born: November 28, 1976 (age 49); Nir Moshe, Israel
- Genres: Rock; Pop; World music
- Instruments: Voice; Guitar; bass guitar; fife
- Years active: 1998-present
- Website: www.avrahamtal.co.il

Avraham Tal (Hebrew: אברהם טל; born 28 November 1976) is an Israeli singer, musician, and musical producer. Tal was the lead singer and writer in the popular Israeli band "Shotei Hanevuah" (Hebrew: שוטי הנבואה) from 1998 until its breakup in 2007. Among the well-known songs which he wrote while in the band are "Mi" (Translation: Who) and "Kol Galgal" (Translation: Voice of a Wheel).

== Biography ==
Avraham Tal was born Avraham Foinquinos Tal in Nir Moshe and grew up in Neve Ativ in the Golan Heights. His parents, Reine (born in Algiers) and Maurice (born in Morocco) both arrived in Marseilles, France as children and immigrated to Israel in the early 1970s.

Tal's musical career began when he was 9 when he was injured in his eye and was hospitalized. In the bed next to him was a boy who played an electronic keyboard which Tal used to play in his spare time. Later on, Tal learned to play other instruments such as the drums, bass guitar and a fife. As a child he used to deliver newspapers in the town where he grew up and would earn several hundred shekels each month with which he bought musical instruments. Tal never formally studied music and is autodidact. Today he produces his albums, writes and composes his songs without any theoretical knowledge in music and writing notes.

=== Musical career ===
After his army service as a cook, Tal joined the band "Shotei HaNevuah" (Translation: Fools of the Prophecy) with which he initially began to gain recognition. Tal was the lead singer and writer in the band from 1998 until its breakup in 2007. Among the well-known songs which he wrote while in the band are "Mi" (Translation: Who) and "Kol Galgal" (Translation: Voice of a Wheel).

With the breakup of "Shotei HaNevua", Tal embarked on a solo career. His first solo track was "Adam Tzover Zichronot" (A Man Accumulates Memories), a cover song for Dorit Reuveni's song which he recorded for a musical project entitled "Avoda Ivrit" (Hebrew Work). The song was ranked at number two on the yearly Galgalatz Chart.

In September 2008, Tal released his first album, "Avraham Tal". Most of the songs on the album were written by Tal himself apart from the song "Em B'Leshonot" which was taken from the First Epistle to the Corinthians in the New Testament. Accompanying the album were the singles "Adam Tzover Zichronot" (A Man Accumulates Memories), "Festival" and "Sdot Esh" (Fields of Fire). That same year, Tal took part in Din Din Aviv's album "Hofshia Bein Olamot" (Free In Between Worlds) where he sang a duet with Aviv entitled "Masa" (Journey) which he took part in writing.

In 2008, Tal composed the soundtrack for Yoram Zack's film "Nimphot Ba Arafel" (Nymphs in the Myst)

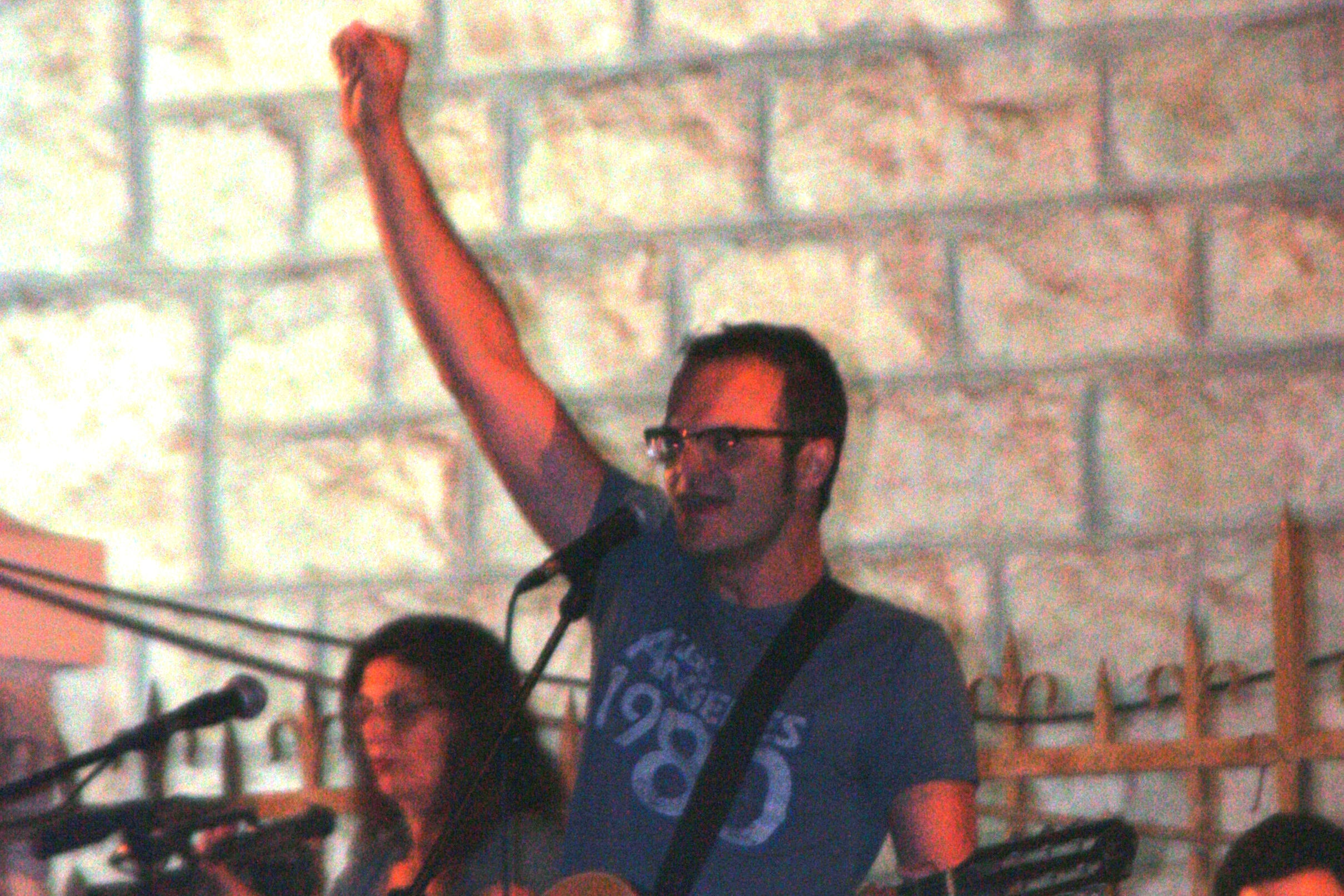
Avraham Tal performing at the Israeli Housing Protest in Jerusalem, 2011

In June 2010, Tal released his second album, "Orot" (Lights). The album sold over 40,000 copies and reached platinum. Prior to the album's release "Orot" and "Mehuzakim L'Olam" (Stronger for the World) which he wrote and composed were played on the radio. The song "Mehuzakim L'Olam" reached the top of the Galgalatz and Reshet Gimel charts. The album earned Tal the title of "Singer of the Year" on the yearly Galgalatz charts and his song "Orot" won "Best Song of the Year" both on the Galgalatz chart and by ACUM.

In Shlomo Artzi's album "Osher Express" (Express Happiness), out in 2012, Tal sang a duet entitled "Elohai" (My God). The song was released as a single.

In March 2013, Tal released his third album, "Shoshana" with the accompanying singles "Ani Itach" (I'm With You) and "Ani Lo Mavin Eich Ha Yom Ole Alay" (I Do Not Understand How the Day Breaks on Me)

In 2014, Tal released his track "At Ba Merchavim" (You Out In the Open) which was recorded from his performance at the Piano Festival. The Song was written in memory of Shay Zorea, a girl who died from cancer.

In November 2015, Tal released the song "Ha Yamim Ovrim" (The Days Are Passing) which was released for his then upcoming fourth album "Tzipiot" (Expectations) which was released on March 1, 2016.

In December 2016, Tal joined the judges panel on "The Voice Israel". In 2018, he recorded a cover of Ofra Haza's "LeOrech Ha Yam" (Along the Sea) for the album "Kol Haneshama - Sharim Ofra Haza" (Voice of the Soul - Singing Ofra Haza).

In May 2017, he performed for the first time at the Caeserea amphitheatre.

In June 2017, Tal released the song "Mi At" (Who Are You) which he wrote and produced together with Johny Goldstein.

In April 2018, for a Ynet project, Tal wrote the song "Or Alon" (Alon's Light) in memory of Alon Bekel who was murdered at the "Simta" Pub in Tel Aviv in 2016.

In May 2018, Tal performed for the second time at the Caeserea amphitheatre and hosted the singer Narkis.

In October 2018, Tal performed for the first time at the Tel Aviv Culture Center while hosting Benaia Barabi and Hanan Ben Ari.

In January 2019, Tal released the single "Li Ze Maspik" (It's Enough For Me) in a collaboration with the sculptor Hen Ziv which was accompanied by an exhibition of their works.

In April 2019, Tal released the song "Shir Hadash" (A New Song) in which Avraham Tal collaborated with Avi Ohayoun and Matan Dror for the first time.

== Personal life ==
Tal was married to Shoshana who produced his latest albums but in February 2018 it was reported that the two split up. They have two children.

Avraham Tal resides in Michmoret.

== Discography ==
=== Shotei Hanevuah ===
- Shotei Hanevua (2000)
- Mehapsim et Dorot (2004)

=== Solo albums ===
- Avraham Tal (2008)
- Orot (2010)
- Shoshana (2013)
- Achshav Hayim (2016)
- Avraham Tal Live (2017)
