= Lionel Faretein =

Israeli musical artist

Lionel Faretein ליאונל פרטיין
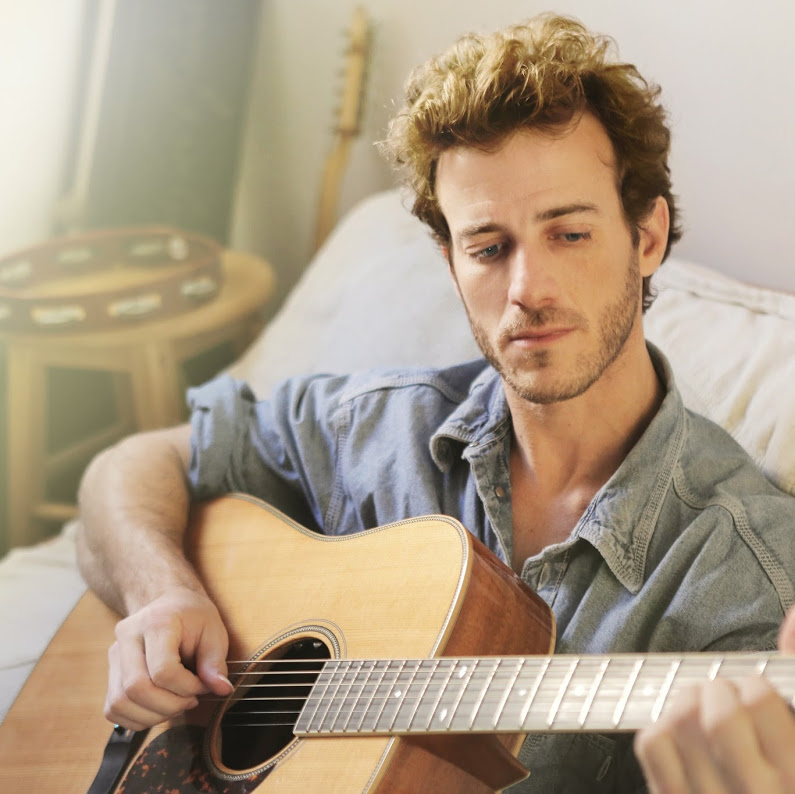

Background information
- Born: 20 February 1982 (age 44)
- Origin: Buenos Aires, Argentina
- Genres: Indie folk, Indie rock
- Occupations: Singer-songwriter, musician, guitarist
- Instruments: Guitar, vocals
- Website: lionelfaretein.com

Lionel Faretein (Hebrew: ליאונל פרטיין; born 20 February 1982) is an Argentine-Israeli musician and singer-songwriter.

== Biography ==
Lionel Faretein was born in Buenos Aires, Argentina. At the age of 7, he moved with his family to Israel, where he began to develop his talent as a musician and composer. At the age of 14, he began performing on stages across the country, playing original material and covers of his musical idols, such as Luis Alberto Spinetta, The Beatles, Jeff Buckley, and Joan Manuel Serrat.

At the age of 18, while performing all over Israel and abroad, Lionel was diagnosed with ulcerative colitis, a chronic intestinal disease which interrupted his life and forced him to take a break from stages. During these years of absence from performing, he decided to begin teaching, passing along his accumulated knowledge in guitar playing, voice, composing, and writing. At the same time, he writes new material, quenching the desire to let his voice be heard again.

In 2008, after a long recovery, Lionel forms a band and starts a tour with his new songs and a growing audience, during which, in one of his performances, he is discovered by the main editor of "The Voice", who invites him to participate in its first Israeli season. In the show, he reaches the semi-finals, gains great media recognition, and evokes the curiosity of key figures in the music industry. At the end of the series, he teams up with first rate artists such as Noa, Aviv Geffen, Gilad Kahana and poet Nathan Zach amongst others.

In December 2015, Lionel released his debut EP in Spanish, his mother tongue, alongside a guest performance at Noa and Gil Dor's 25th anniversary concert at the Liceu in Barcelona.

"Love & Happiness" – His debut English album is about to be released in 2018

== Discography ==
=== Studio albums ===
- Love & Happiness (2018)

=== Extended plays ===
- Mi Camino (2015)
