= Niv Demirel =

Israeli singer-songwriter (born 1995)

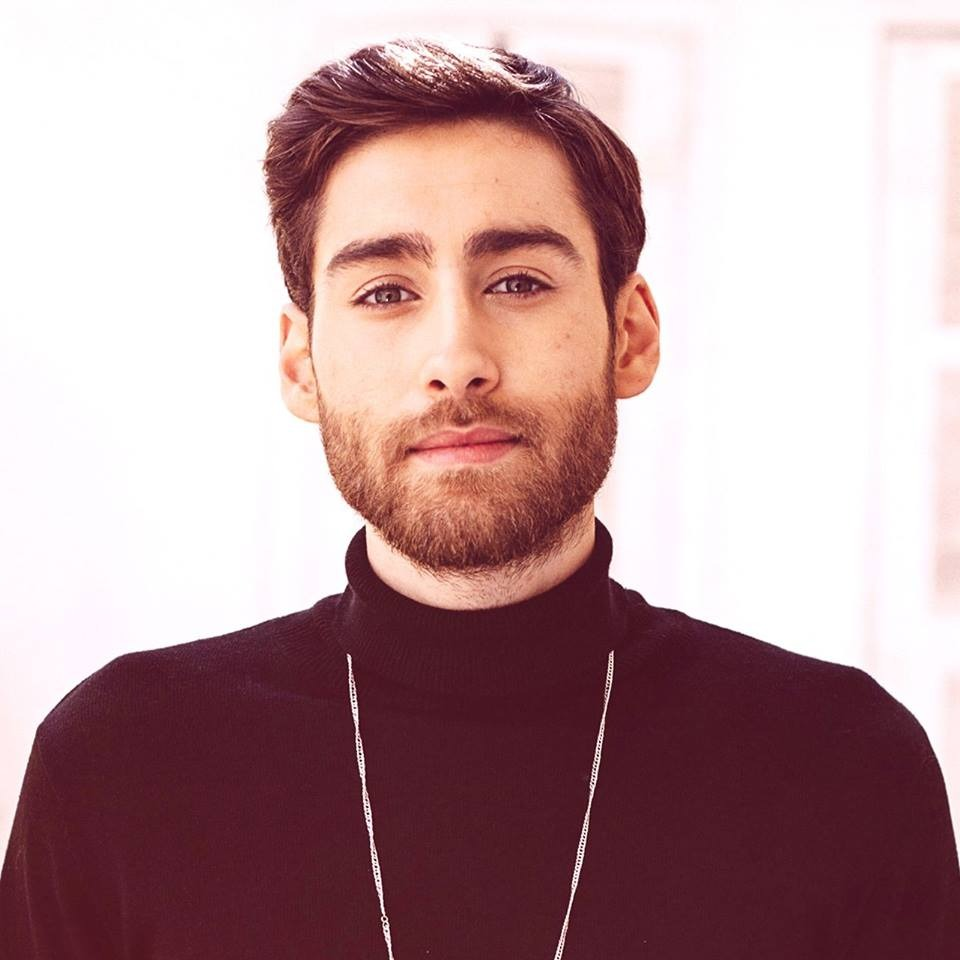

Background information
- Born: January 20, 1995 (age 31); Hadera
- Genres: Pop; R&B; Alternative R&B
- Occupation: Singer
- Years active: 2014-present

Niv Demirel (Hebrew: ניב דמירל; born January 20, 1995) is an Israeli singer, songwriter, and composer. He rose to fame after his participation in the third season of the reality show "The Voice of Israel."

== Biography ==
Demirel grew up in Hadera. He served in the Israel Defense Forces in the Air Force Bands. In 2014, he auditioned for the reality show "The Voice of Israel," was included on Mosh Ben Ari team, and placed fourth in the show finale.

Following his time on the show, Demirel began working on his debut album, which included the singles "Normal", written and composed by Dudi Bar-David; "Nativ Ahar", written by Ori Ben Ari, who also composed the song with Eitan Darmon; "Ani Ata and Yossi", written by Ori Ben Ari, who also composed the song with Demirel; "Bein Simiman", written and composed by Demirel; and "Hashat HaKatnot", written by Ori Ben Ari, who also composed the song with Eitan Darmon. The song peaked at number 17 out of 40 on Galgalatz and Ynet annual Hebrew songs chart in 2016. Additionally, the music video "Bahagim", written and composed by Demirel and Ori Ben Ari, was released.

The debut album, "Bein Simanim," was released on March 30, 2017, with musical arrangements and production by Ariel Tuchman. It also included the songs "Hakol Narega," written by Eitan Darmon, who also composed the song with Demirel; "Aat Awet Auti Khemo Shani," written by Ron Malachi and composed by Moriah Levy; and "Hakodtud Falashet," written and composed by Demirel. During 2017, she signed with a label.

In 2017, she signed with an Argentine record label called Warner Music Group, and in July of that year, she flew to Argentina and recorded a Spanish-language mini-album there, most of which consists of songs from the Israeli album translated into Spanish. In May 2021, she released the duet "Adeef HaGegu" with Nofar Salman. The song was written by Niv and Nofar together, with arrangements by Ariel Tuchman. In April 2022, she released the single "Maya," written and composed by Avi Ben Zaken. In July, she participated in the ninth season of the reality show "The Next Star" and placed sixth.

In March 2023, he released the single "A Distant Place". In July of that same year, he released the single "Now". On August 22, Demirel released the single "If I Could", which expresses frustration over a lack of self-realization and a sense of failure. The song was written and composed by Avi Ben Zaken. On September 18, 2023, he released his second album, "Good Child". On November 28 of that same year, he released the single.

On January 14, 2024, Demirel and his military bandmate, Shalev Edri, collaborated on the single "Outside War", which addresses the reality in Israel since the October 7 massacre and specifically expresses the experience of residents of the western Negev. The song, with lyrics and music by Edri, is dedicated to all those who have lived and continue to live through the horror of the events. On February 18, he released the single "In My World". On April 14, Demirel released "Only You", a collaboration with singer-songwriter May Safdia. Demirel and Safdia composed and arranged the song themselves, and co-wrote it with Avichai Jerfi. Demirel commented that during a songwriting session about a year and a half ago, he, Safdia, and Jerfi wrote the song, and even then they knew they would sing it together.

On December 8, 2024, he released the mini-album "Yamim ve'Onot," consisting of seven songs. Demirel wrote and composed the album, produced and arranged by Matan Dror, who co-composed the song "Meshhu Shenshaar" with Demirel. The song "La Nerga'at" was written and composed in collaboration with Noy Pedalon, and the song "L'achaps Aucht" was co-written by Niv Demirel and Avichai Jarfi.
