= Kathleen Reiter =

Canadian-Israeli musical artist

Kathleen Reiter קטלין רייטר
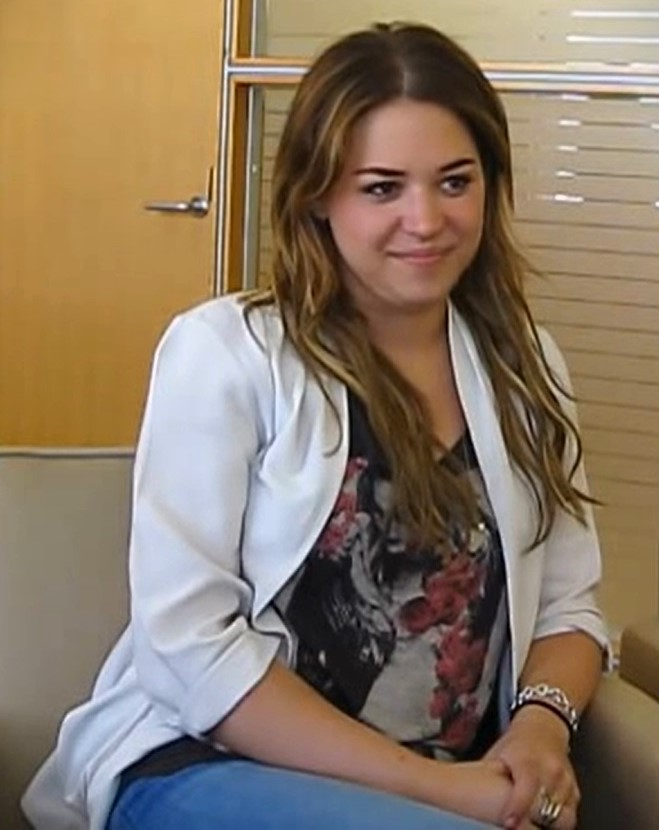
- Reiter in 2012

Background information
- Born: 7 September 1988 (age 38); Montreal, Quebec, Canada
- Origin: Tel Aviv, Israel
- Genres: Pop; R&B
- Occupation: Singer
- Instrument: Vocals
- Years active: 2011–present
- Label: Helicon

Kathleen Reiter (Hebrew: קטלין רייטר; born 7 September 1988) is a Canadian-Israeli singer most notable for winning the first season of The Voice Israel.

Reiter was born in Montreal, Quebec, Canada, to Israeli parents, and immigrated to Israel just days before the competition. Her father is of Ashkenazi Jewish descent, where her mother is of Moroccan Jewish descent. Reiter lives in Tel Aviv.

Reiter puts her success in the competition down to being able to sing in English, Hebrew and French.

Reiter's songs include "Shouting to You" and "Nothing Will Help Me" (כלום לא יעזור לי).

Awards and achievements
Preceded by N/A	The Voice ישראל; Winner; 2012	Succeeded by Lina Makhul
