= Aderet (singer) =

Israeli singer-songwriter and entertainer

Aderet אדרת
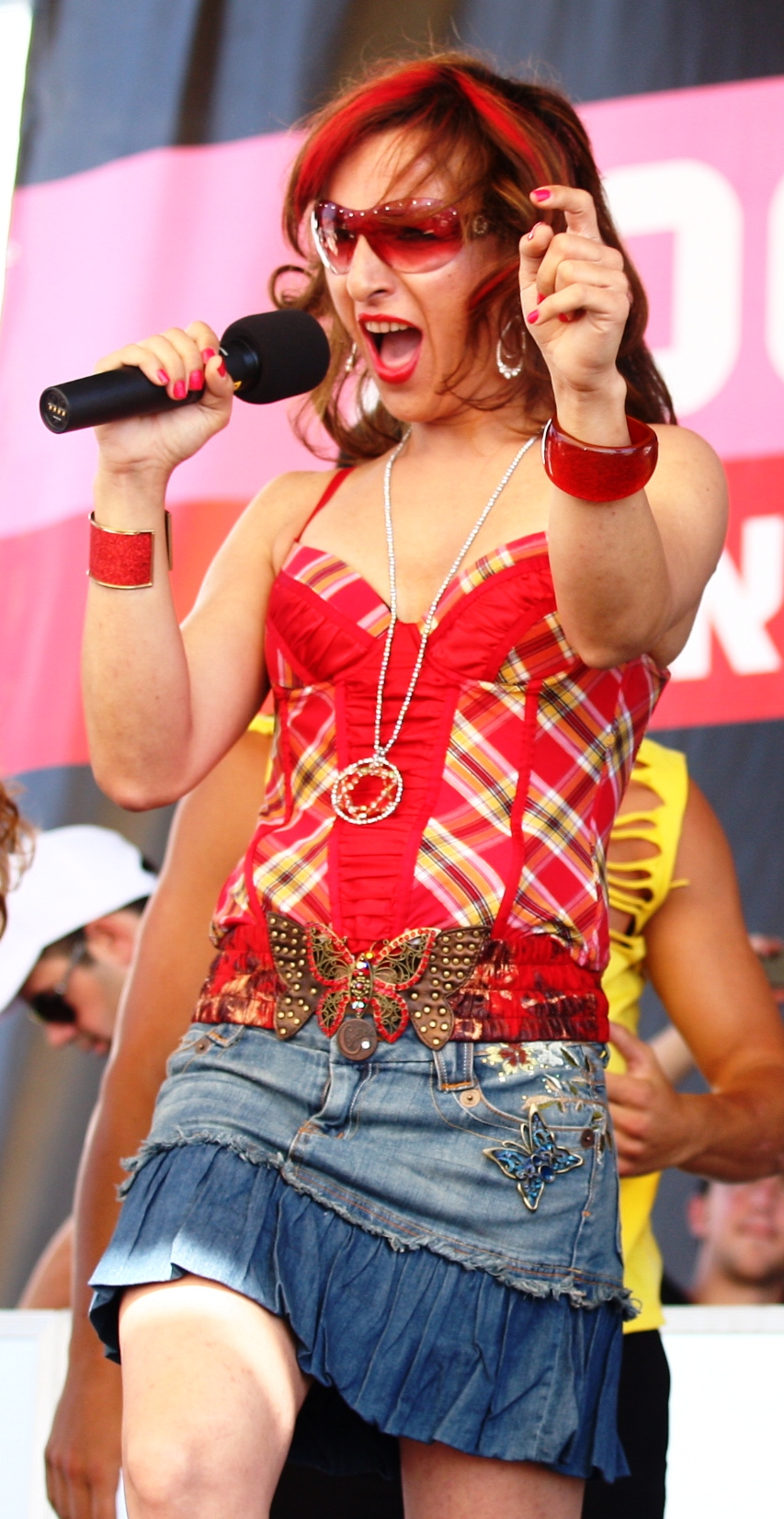
- Aderet

Background information
- Born: Hadar Babayof; Israel
- Origin: Israel
- Genres: Pop; Trance; Dance
- Occupations: Singer-songwriter; DJ; Producer; Entertainer
- Years active: 2001–present
- Labels: Hit Records & Promo; Brisma; OMG

Hadar Babayof (born 1975), known professionally as Aderet (Hebrew: אדרת), is an Israeli singer-songwriter, DJ, producer and entertainer. Her music is heavily influenced by pop, trance, and dance music.

== Career ==
=== 2000s ===
In 2001, her first single "Le'at Uvatuah" ("Slowly and Surely") started playing on the radio. Her two albums, Tenth Floor and Without the Evil Eye, were released in 2001 and 2005. In February 2016 she became one of the owners of the Israeli record music label Hit Records & Promo. In 2008 her single "Say No More" became a hit in Lebanon after playing on "Beirut Nights", a Lebanese online radio station which plays dance music.

The remix of her club hit "Say No More", produced by DJ Dvir Halevi, became a popular trance song on the radio. Excerpt from Good Morning America: "Israeli singer Aderet is breaking boundaries. Her hit song is not only topping the charts in Israel but also in nearby Lebanon. But there's a real twist to this unlikely new ambassador for peace."

=== 2010s ===
She worked with some of the most popular Israeli DJs for her third album named Jewish Girl. Part 1 of that album was released in January 2012. Four English language singles from the album became big hits at clubs and on the Israel dance music charts and three of them got into the playlist of online radio stations in Lebanon.

Since January 2012, Aderet has her own radio show named "Jacuzzi" on Allforpeace radio. Aderet participated in the Girls DJ Festival 2012 and got into the top 20. In February 2013 she participated in the Kdam Eurovision competition with the song "Victory".

In June 2014, DJ Angelo Russo released a remix of Aderet's hit "Say No More", released on the Italian label Brisma. It's the first time that one of Aderet's songs got into the Beatport. In November 2014 Aderet participated on the Global rockstar semi final contest with her song "Chaos" and finished in 2nd place. In March 2016, her popular radio show, "Jacuzzi", started to be broadcast live by Music Galaxy Radio (MGR) in London. "Vyzion" radio from North Carolina has broadcast her show since June 2016 In February 2016 Became one of the music label owners 'Hit Records & Promo'. In September 2016 she got into the playlist of the radio 'Trance-energy radio' with her hit 'Say no more' (Dreamelodic remix) In August 2020 became one of the owners of the new radio Hits IL. In August 2022 she released a new song calls 'Feels Good'. In May 2023, DJ Guglielmo Bini's remix of the latest single 'Feels Good' was released via the Italian record label OMG and entered the global top 100 of the NU DISCO / INDIE DANCE chart on Traxsource https://www.traxsource.com/genre/17/nu-disco-indie-dance/top

== Personal life ==
Aderet was born to a Jewish religious family in Jerusalem, and from an early age she began writing and composing music. She served in the IDF, working with soldiers suffering from adjustment problems.

Aderet is transgender, and after her discharge from the IDF, she began a process of gender reassignment.
