= Shlomi Shabat =

Israeli vocalist (born 1954)

Shlomi Shabat שלומי שבת
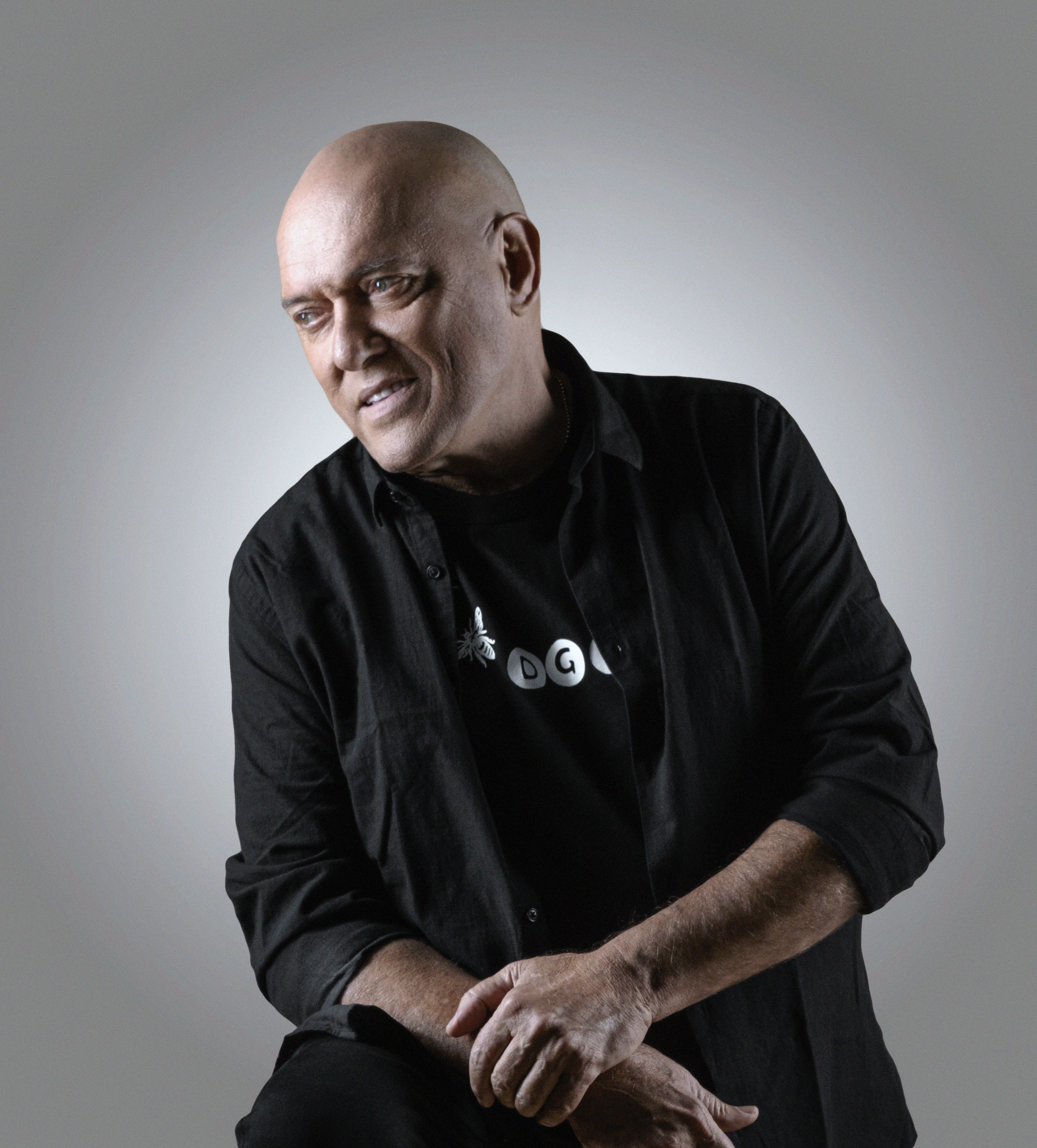

Background information
- Born: Shlomi Shabat; August 30, 1954 (age 71)
- Origin: Yehud, Israel
- Genres: Pop, Mizrahi music, Rock
- Years active: 1985-present
- Labels: Helicon Records, NMC

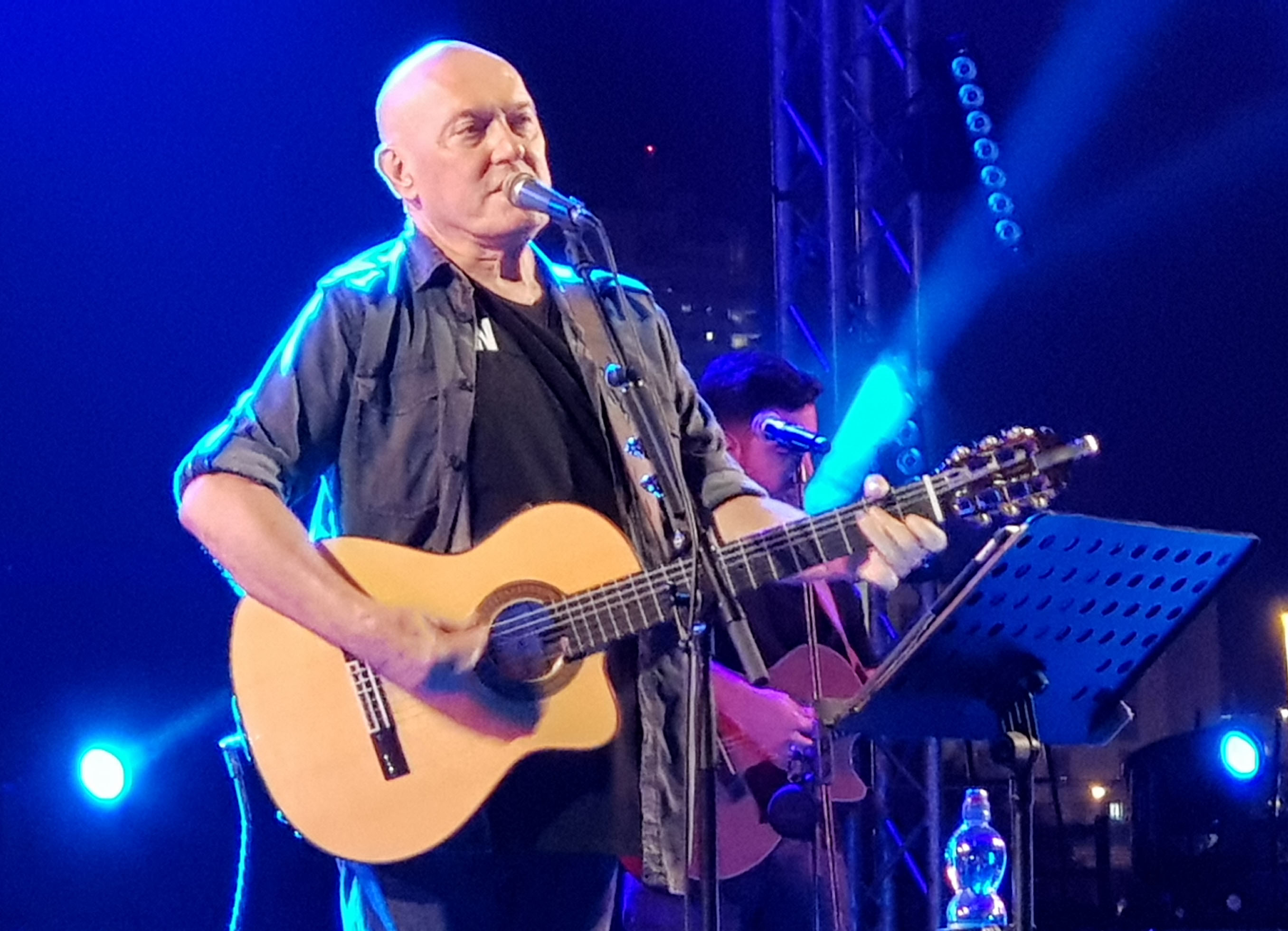
Shlomi Shabat, 2018

Shlomi Shabat (Hebrew: שלומי שבת; born August 30, 1954) is an Israeli vocalist and musician. He is of Turkish Jewish origin.

== Early life ==
Shabat was born in Yehud, Israel, to a family of Turkish Jewish descent who immigrated from Turkey. He sings in Hebrew, Turkish, and Spanish. His sister, Lea Shabat, is also a singer songwriter.

== Personal life ==
In 2026, Shabat dedicated a Torah scroll and a haftarah scroll to the synagogue in his residential building in Netanya in memory of his parents and brother. He also began organizing regular weekday minyan services there.

== Musical career ==
His CDs include Friends and Live in Caesaria, in which he sings with other Israeli artists, including his sister Lea Shabat, Shiri Maimon, and Lior Narkis.

In 2002, he was nominated for the Tamuz Award of Israel's Best Male Artist, along with David D'Or, Arkadi Duchin, Yuval Gabay, and Yehuda Poliker, but lost out to D'Or.

In 2006, Shabat released a CD which contains duets and is named Friends 2. It was his ninth solo album, and was made in the same style as the first Friends duets album from 2001.

Shabat sang a duet with David D'Or on D'Or's CD, Kmo HaRuach ("Like the Wind"), which was released on March 27, 2006. Ein od milevado

== Television career ==
Shlomi Shabat was one of the judges in the inaugural season of The Voice Israel on Israeli television.

== Honors ==
In 2021 Shabat was honored as one of the torchbearers in the national Israeli Independence Day ceremony.

== Discography ==
- I've Returned From the Dark - 1987 - מן החושך חזרתי
- Because of the Wind - 1989 - בגלל הרוח
- Don't Go Too Far - 1991 - אל תלכי רחוק מדי
- An Hour Together - 1993 - שעה אחת ביחד
- Shlomi Shabat - 1998 - שלומי שבת
- Friends - 2001 - חברים
- Golden Hits - 2001 - להיטי זהב
- Time of Love - 2003 - זמן אהבה
- Shlomi Shabat in Cesarea - 2005 - המופע המשותף בקיסריה
- Friends 2 - 2006 - חברים 2

== See also ==
- List of Israeli musical artists
