= Ofir Ben Shitrit =

Israeli Orthodox Jewish singer

Ofir Ben Shitrit אופיר בן שטרית
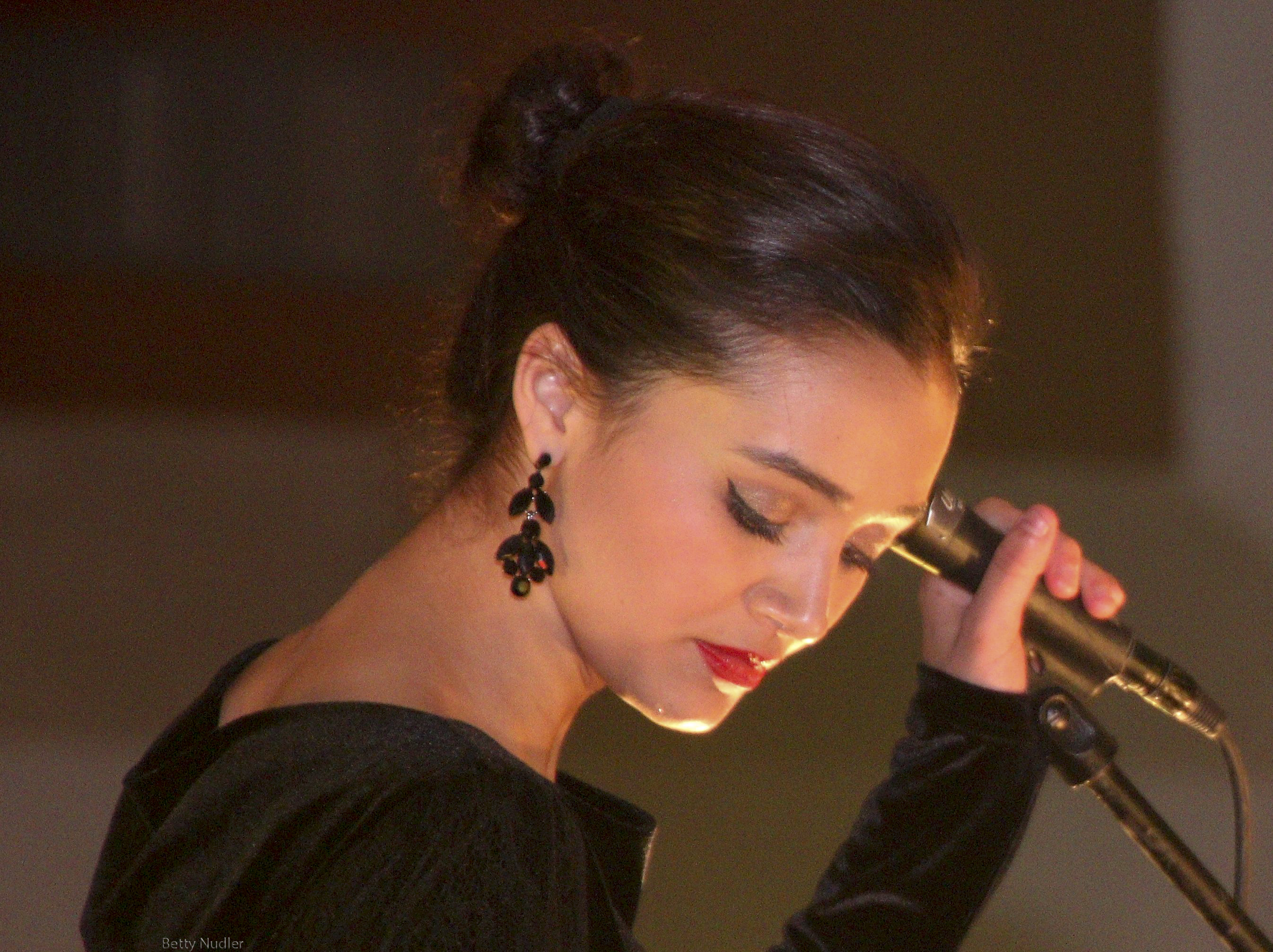
- Ben Shitrit in 2014

Background information
- Born: 20 December 1995 (age 30) (Note: 27 Kislev 5756 in the Hebrew calendar.)
- Origin: Nir Galim, Israel
- Occupation: Singer
- Years active: 2013–present
- Website: https://ofirbs95.wixsite.com/ofirbenshitrit

Ofir Ben Shitrit (Hebrew: אופיר בן שטרית; born 20 December 1995) is an Israeli Orthodox Jewish singer. She came to prominence in 2013 as a contestant on the reality singing competition The Voice Israel. She received additional media attention due to her religious background, which led to controversy and opposition in her Orthodox Jewish religious community. She launched her professional singing career in 2013, performing Hebrew, English, Arabic and Spanish songs and covers.

== Early life and education ==
Ben Shitrit was born to a religious Orthodox Jewish family in 1995. Her parents, Avram and Odelia Ben Shitrit, are of Moroccan Jewish descent. She has three siblings. The family resides in the religious moshav of Nir Galim, Israel.

Ben Shitrit enjoyed singing from a young age. She began writing her own songs at age 11, and won her school's annual singing contest for six years in a row.

She enrolled at the ulpana (religious girl's high school) in Ashdod, Israel. Shitrit graduated from her ulpana in spring 2013. She signed up for a year of Sherut Leumi (National Service), after which she planned to study music in university. As of 2016 she was studying music at the Jerusalem Academy of Music and Dance, receiving her bachelor's degree in music in 2018.

== The Voice Israel ==
I think the Torah wants us to be happy. It wants music to make people happy. I think you can combine Torah and music, and this is why I chose to come on the show.

— Ofir Ben Shitrit, appearing on The Voice Israel

In fall 2012, Ben Shitrit's aunt brought her to an audition for The Voice Israel. Though she didn't prepare in advance, she qualified for a slot on the season 2 debut. In January 2013, the seventeen-year-old 12th-grader appeared as one of 50 contestants on the show. Ben Shitrit's performance of Ofra Haza's Od Mechaka La'Echad ("Still Waiting for the One") won plaudits from the celebrity judges, and she chose Aviv Gefen to be her mentor. Ben Shitrit shook Gefen's hand to seal the deal.

The response from Ben Shitrit's ulpana was swift in coming. As women singing in front of men and handshaking between genders are forbidden by rabbinic law, the school suspended her for two weeks. The school also ordered Ben Shitrit to take classes in Judaism. Since Ministry of Education regulations do not allow a school to suspend a student for appearing on a television show, the school asked Ben Shitrit's parents to initiate the penalty. Ben Shitrit's mother told Maariv: "This is a punishment that we took upon ourselves, so that the girls in the institution will see that we will do something with the child".

Ben Shitrit accepted the suspension, saying, "I understood that what I did was against the spirit of the ulpana, and didn't want to create an opening for other girls to do the same. The punishment is symbolic". In later interviews, she pushed back against the rabbinic law prohibiting women singing in front of men, saying she thought it was more about modesty than an outright ban on singing. "I feel like there is no problem to sing in public as long as I do so in a modest way, not a provocative way, as long as I'm doing it with a pure intention", she said.

Ben Shitrit was viewed as a "heroine" by traditional Israeli Jews who wish to be part of secular society while maintaining their religious observance. One commentator dubbed her "the religious Rosa Parks", noting that she had become "an icon and a figure for thousands of girls who look at you and see the fulfillment of their dreams in poetry, dance and theater", as well as "a symbol of the collision between the binding law of God (so to speak) and the realization of freedom and creativity". Ben Shitrit received support from Minister of Education Naftali Bennett, a Religious Zionist himself, who praised her voice on his Facebook page. In response, the Ministry of Education issued a statement that ulpana students are required to follow the rules of their school if it mandates a religious lifestyle. Ben Shitrit was also supported by the progressive Jewish organization Tzohar. Ben Shitrit ultimately finished in second place on The Voice Israel, losing to Lina Makhul.

In December 2013, the Jewish Orthodox Feminist Alliance invited Ben Shitrit to New York City to sing at its international conference. The organization posted her name and face on a billboard in Times Square saluting the "key personalities at the forefront of the Orthodox feminist movement".

== Professional career ==
Ben Shitrit launched her professional music career in 2013, performing original songs and covers of Hebrew, English, and Spanish songs. She has performed with the Israeli Andalusian Orchestra in Ashdod. She has also performed piyyutim with the Israeli women's group "Neshot Chava" ("Women of Eve"), and recorded a song for the Religious Zionist political party, The Jewish Home's 2015 election campaign.

In 2016 she began modeling modest clothing for the Modesto fashion website.

== Personal life ==
She married Israeli photographer Harel Amsalem in March 2016. In June 2017 the couple had their first child, a boy.
