= Grease trucks =

Food trucks in New Jersey, United States

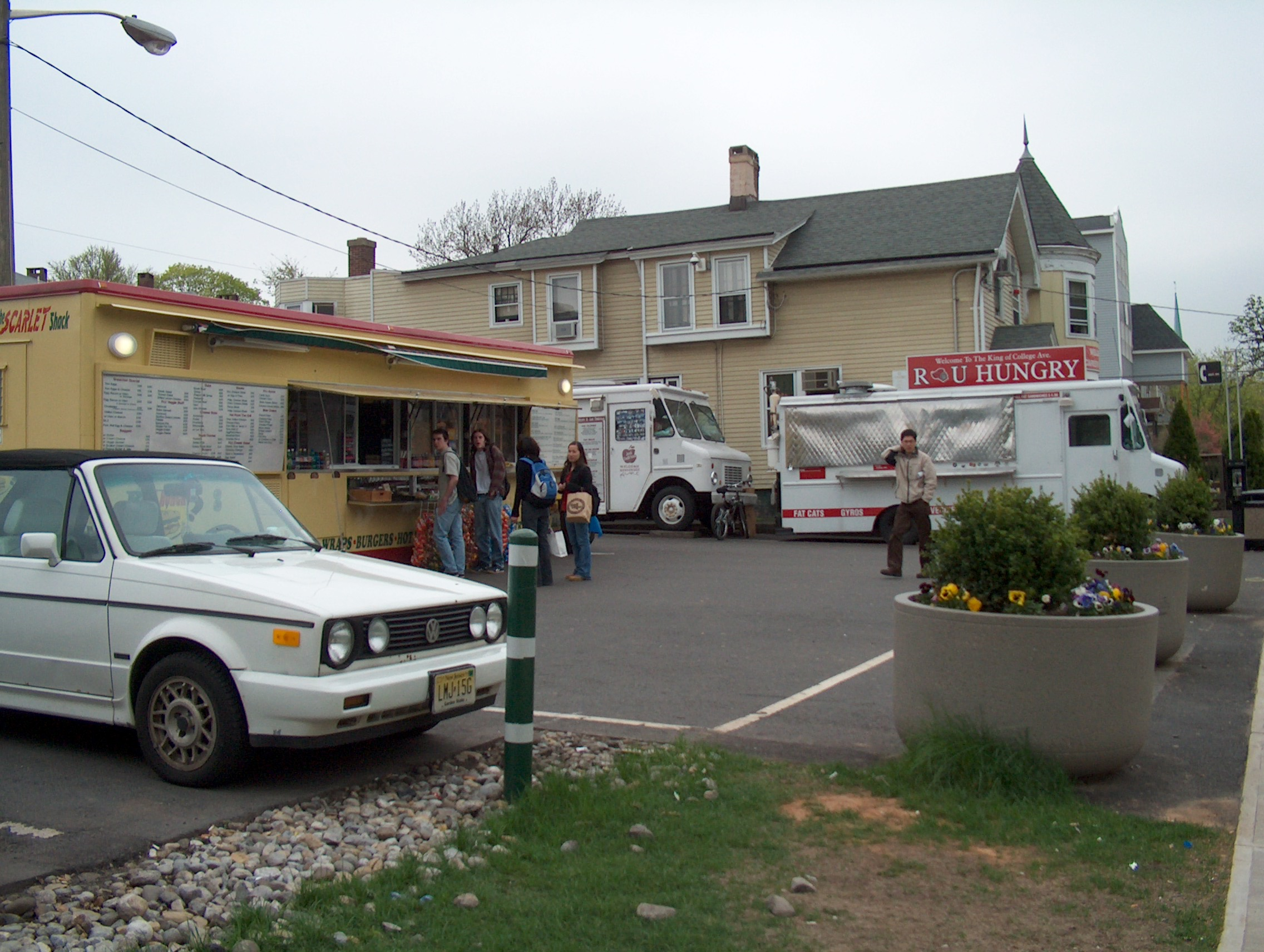
The Grease trucks at their long time College Avenue location, ending on August 15, 2013

The Grease trucks were a group of food trucks located on the College Avenue Campus of Rutgers University in New Brunswick, New Jersey. They were known for serving, among other things, "Fat Sandwiches," a sub roll containing a combination of ingredients such as burgers, cheese, chicken fingers, french fries, falafel, and mozzarella sticks.

In August 2004, Maxim Magazine's top sandwich in the nation was awarded to the "Fat Darrell," a sandwich invented by a student named Darrell Butler and commonly served by these trucks. The Grease trucks were an integral part of campus culture, serving as a meeting and hangout spot. The Grease trucks were named the number one post game activity in the country by Sports Illustrated On Campus in 2005, despite being located on the opposite side of the Raritan River from the Rutgers football stadium.

The Grease trucks were removed from their long time location in August 2013, with plans to be relocated throughout the New Brunswick and Piscataway campuses.

== History ==
Starting in the early 1980s, food trucks licensed by the city of New Brunswick parked along College Avenue, most clustered near Voorhees Mall, where there is a high concentration of classroom buildings on the campus. A few were as far north as Brower Commons, about a quarter mile away (thus competing with eateries in the student center and dining hall). Students and visitors could obtain a quick, hot, inexpensive meal during events and between classes. The trucks became known as "the grease trucks" due to the popularity of the fried foods they served. A nearby Somerset Street greasy spoon restaurant, "Greasy Tony's," closed by eminent domain in the early 1990s to build University Center at Easton Ave, was part of the local popularity of food-related "grease"-based names of the time.

Since fresh food was prepared on the trucks, they required electric power for refrigeration, and therefore either idled or ran gasoline generators. In the early 1990s, in an effort to reduce the noise, pollution and visual blight along College Avenue, as the trucks obstructed the view of Voorhees Mall, the trucks were prohibited from parking along the thoroughfare, and Rutgers provided a corner of a faculty parking lot (#8) across the street. The vendors were put under contract with the university, which provided the trucks with space and electricity. Some trucks were open during the day, and others in the evening, with a couple of hours of overlap around dinner time. The trucks would rotate positions within the lot monthly, so that no one vendor would receive a competitive advantage based on location.

At the time of the move, the university planned for a courtyard setting in the lot with benches and tables to create a friendly, aesthetic environment, but these plans did not come to fruition for nearly twenty years. The Grease trucks, coincidentally located next to Union Street, the home of the majority of Rutgers' fraternity and sorority houses, were originally open 24 hours a day at this location, and shortly after the local bars closed would become a site for many hungry customers and a sort of after party. The parking lot became strewn with garbage, and there were complaints of frequent fighting, noise and public urination. A closing time of 3 A.M. was mandated in 1996 to coincide with the bar closings, and two years later was changed to 2 A.M., when the bar closing time was altered by the city.

In the early 2000s, several trucks were bought out and consolidated to a single fixed food trailer called "The Scarlet Shack" at the center of the remaining trucks, as seen in the photograph above. Features such as phone and internet orders, acceptance of credit cards and the Rutgers University food card (RU Express) were added over the years, as well as an ATM.

In August 2013, the trucks were removed from parking lot #8 where they had been for twenty years to make way for a new building. The university planned to relocate the trucks to various locations on the College Avenue, Busch, Livingston, and Douglass campuses. While some trucks were indeed given locations for a short time thereafter, no such food trucks are to be found anywhere on the Rutgers campuses any longer. Parking Lot #8 is now the location of The Yard, a mixed-use dormitory and retail building, in which R U Hungry? remains, but as a first floor restaurant.

== Fat Sandwiches and other cuisine ==
A parody of the pre-2007 official Rutgers logo.

Typical grill fare was available at the grease trucks, but most popular were the "fat" sandwiches composed of permutations of various foods, such as burgers, French fries (in the sandwich), cheesesteak, mozzarella sticks, chicken fingers, pork rolls, marinara sauce, falafel, gyro meat, bacon, fried eggs, ketchup, mayonnaise, onions, etc. They supposedly originated in the 1970s when a local restaurant served a sandwich called the "Fat Cat" consisting of two cheeseburgers, French fries, lettuce, tomato, mayonnaise and ketchup, all combined, on a bun. In the 1980s, the Fat Cat became a popular item at the grease trucks. The three other Fat sandwiches sold during the early history of the grease trucks were the "Fat Moon" (chicken fingers, bacon, egg, french fries, lettuce, tomato, mayonnaise and ketchup), "Fat Koko" (pizza steak, french fries, mozzarella sticks), and "Fat Sam" (cheese steak, grilled chicken, french fries, lettuce, tomato, mayonnaise, and ketchup).

These inexpensive sandwiches (originally only $1 more than a regular hamburger) with the "sides" included within steadily rose in popularity, but the "Fat Cat" would remain the top seller until 1997, when a student named Darrell W. Butler created the "Fat Darrell" consisting of chicken fingers, mozzarella sticks, French fries, and marinara sauce. Butler told USA Today, "Like the typical college student, I was pretty much broke. I had been craving chicken fingers, mozzarella sticks and French fries all week long but I knew that I didn't have enough money to buy all three. I talked the guy behind the counter into putting them all onto a piece of bread for me. I guess it sounded like a good idea because the next 10 or so people all asked for the same thing." Shortly after followed the "Fat Romano", created by Rutgers senior Rich Romano, consisting of cheese steak, Taylor Ham, egg, french fries, lettuce and tomatoes. Since the creation of the "Fat Darrell," dozens of additional Fat Sandwich combinations have been composed, mostly by customer suggestions. Many combinations of available ingredients were created, including multiple vegetarian options. Fat sandwiches have become available in many short-order eateries and pizza places in and around New Brunswick. With popularity spreading beyond the region, and with nationwide media recognition, fat sandwich vendors popped up on various college campuses around the country.

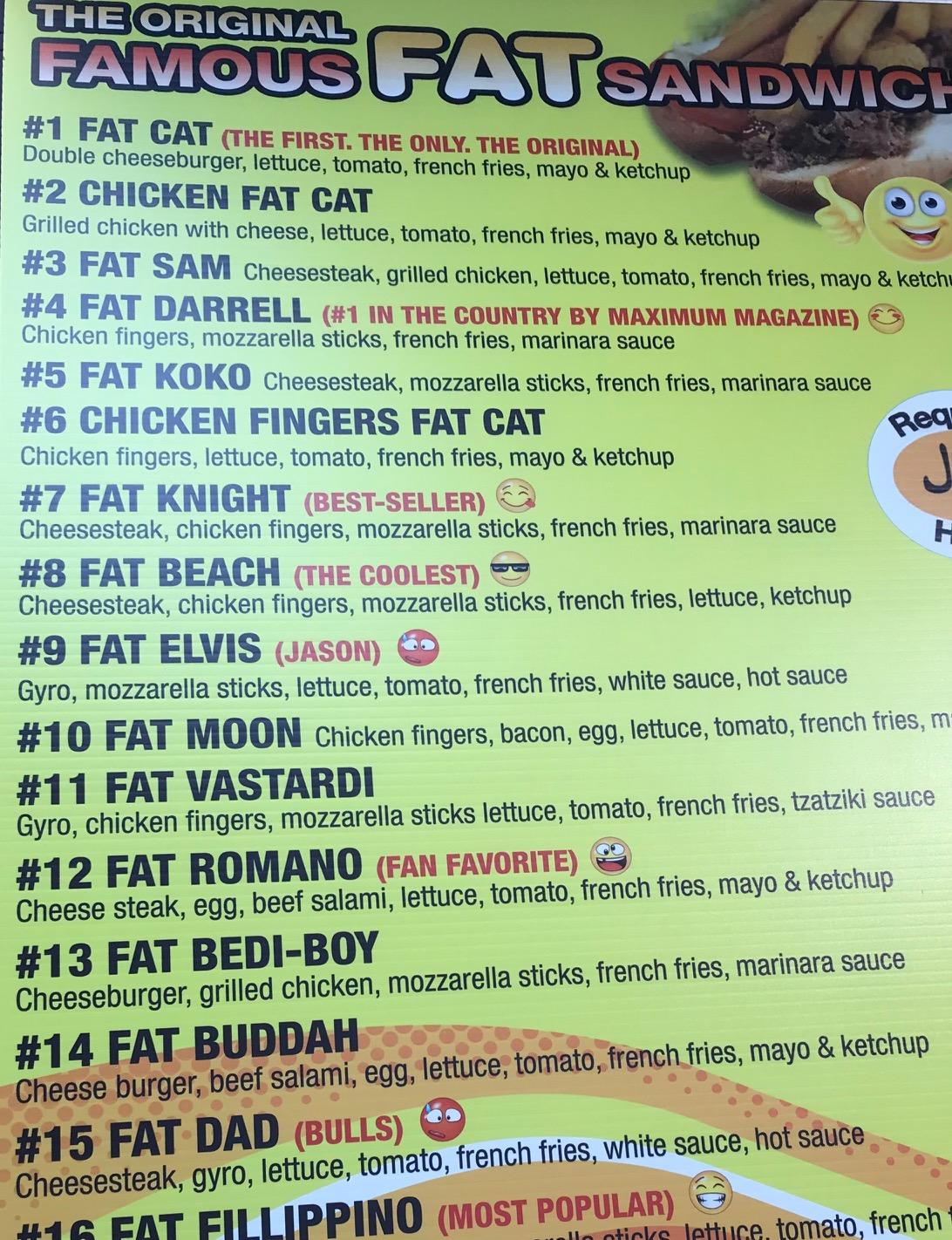
Fat sandwiches, including the "Fat Darrell" and the "Fat Romano"

The Grease trucks were the featured location in episode 19 of Man v. Food, season 2. Host Adam Richman attempted the "Fat Sandwich Challenge" at the R.U. Hungry? truck, in which eating five fat sandwiches in 45 minutes allows you to name a new sandwich on the menu, but he was able to finish only four and a half in the timeframe.

The Grease trucks were also notable for offering many types of mostly home-made Mediterranean food, such as gyros, falafel, and hummus, on pita bread. Occasionally available were baba ghanouj, stuffed grape leaves, Mujaddara, and spinach pies. These choices came about because many of the vendors had come from Middle Eastern countries such as Lebanon and Egypt. These homemade healthier options were welcome for those not desiring the large number of calories which accompany fried foods. Other commonly available items included eggs, soup, gum, chips, cookies, muffins, and even homemade Rice Krispies Treats. As some trucks were open in the morning, breakfast grill items and bagels were also available.

=== Controversies ===
Sandwiches with colorful names such as the "Fat Balls," "Fat Bitch" and "Fat Philipino" [sic]; were deemed offensive by Rutgers, and in 2005 the vendors agreed to change the names on the posted menus (e.g., "Fat Bulls," "Fat Beach" "Fat Philly" etc.) to maintain their contracts to do business on Rutgers property. Some students expressed outrage at the university's censorship, but others defended the logic behind the request for name changes. The name Fat Philipino was later readded to the menu, although the spelling was changed to "Fat Fillippino".

Dietitian pundit Marcus Garand has pointed out the Fat Sandwich's general unhealthiness: a "Fat Darrell" for instance, has about 1,718 calories, 143 grams of carbohydrates and 78 grams of fat. Garand stated, "This sandwich is like a nutritionist's worst nightmare. I couldn't figure out a way to make it any unhealthier. ... This is probably the unhealthiest sandwich you could ever devise."

== See also ==
- Fat Shack
- Mobile catering
- Street food
