= Fat Shack =

American fast-casual restaurant chain

Fat Shack Inc.
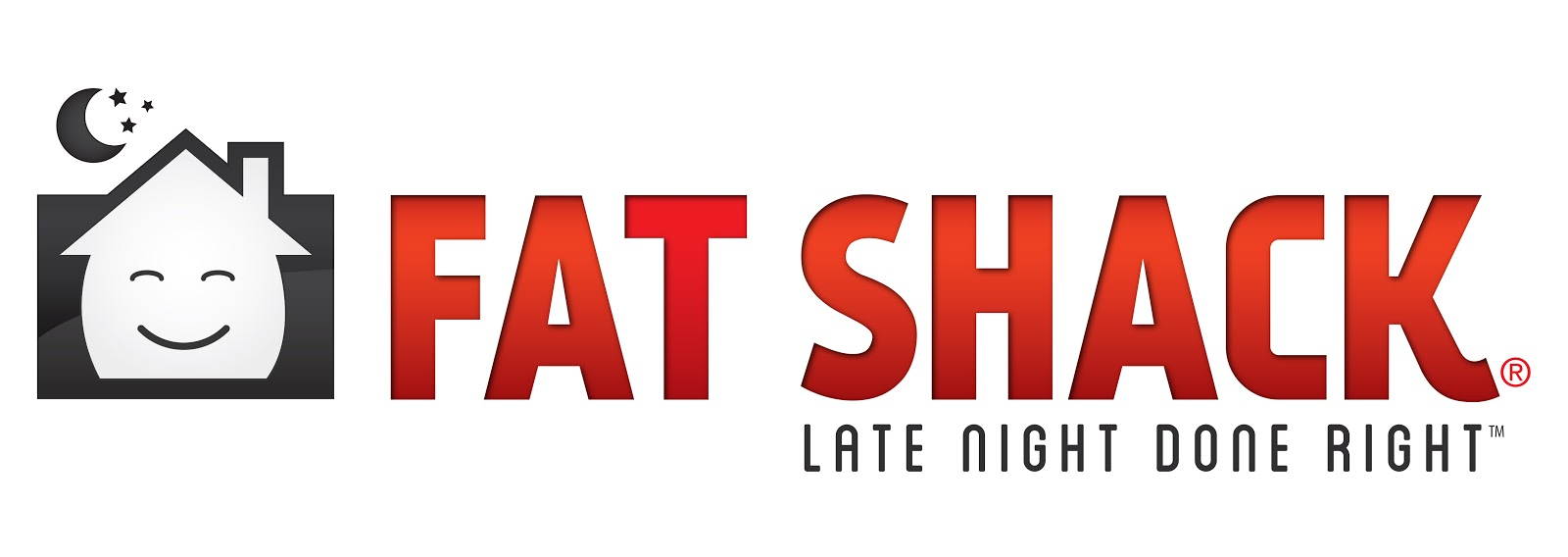
- Company type: Privately held company
- Genre: Fast casual restaurant
- Founded: 2010; 15 years ago
- Founder: Tom Armenti
- Headquarters: Denver, Colorado
- Number of locations: 31 (2025)
- Area served: United States
- Website: www.fatshack.com

Fat Shack is an American fast-casual restaurant chain founded in Fort Collins, Colorado. As of September 2025, it has 31 corporate and franchise-owned restaurants across fourteen states; the most recent opening was in Sioux Falls, South Dakota, marking their entry into the state.

== History ==
=== Origins ===
The Fat Shack concept was created in February 2010 by Tom Armenti and a group of longtime friends intown of Ramsey, New Jersey, operating from 6 pm to 4 am in a bagel shop owned by the family of one of the friends (which operated at the location during the day time). Once the bagel shop's staff left for the day at 3PM, Tom would re-open the store and operate his new late night restaurant from 6PM to 4AM.

In August 2011, Armenti moved to Fort Collins, Colorado, where he opened the doors to the first full-size Fat Shack restaurant.

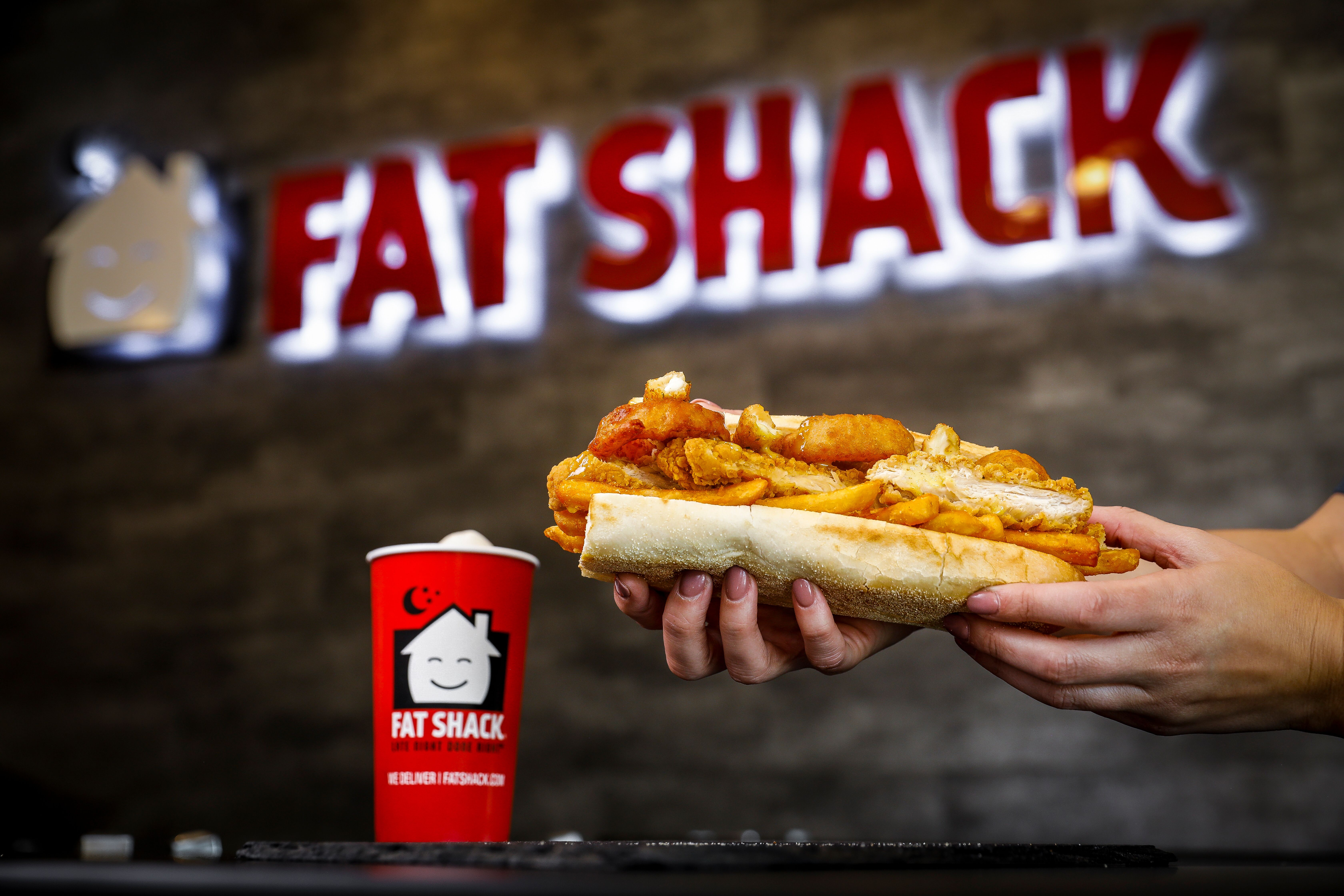
Fat Shack Sandwich

=== Growth ===
Armenti's college classmate and close friend, Kevin Gabauer joined the company in Fort Collins and worked with the founder to re-organize the menu, refreshing the company's brand and simplifying operations. Within six months, Fat Shack opened another location in Boulder.

In February 2015, Fat Shack celebrated the grand opening of its first franchise in Denver at DU. After opening several more locations in Colorado, interstate expansion began in Denton, Texas. Fat Shack now has 29 locations throughout the United States.

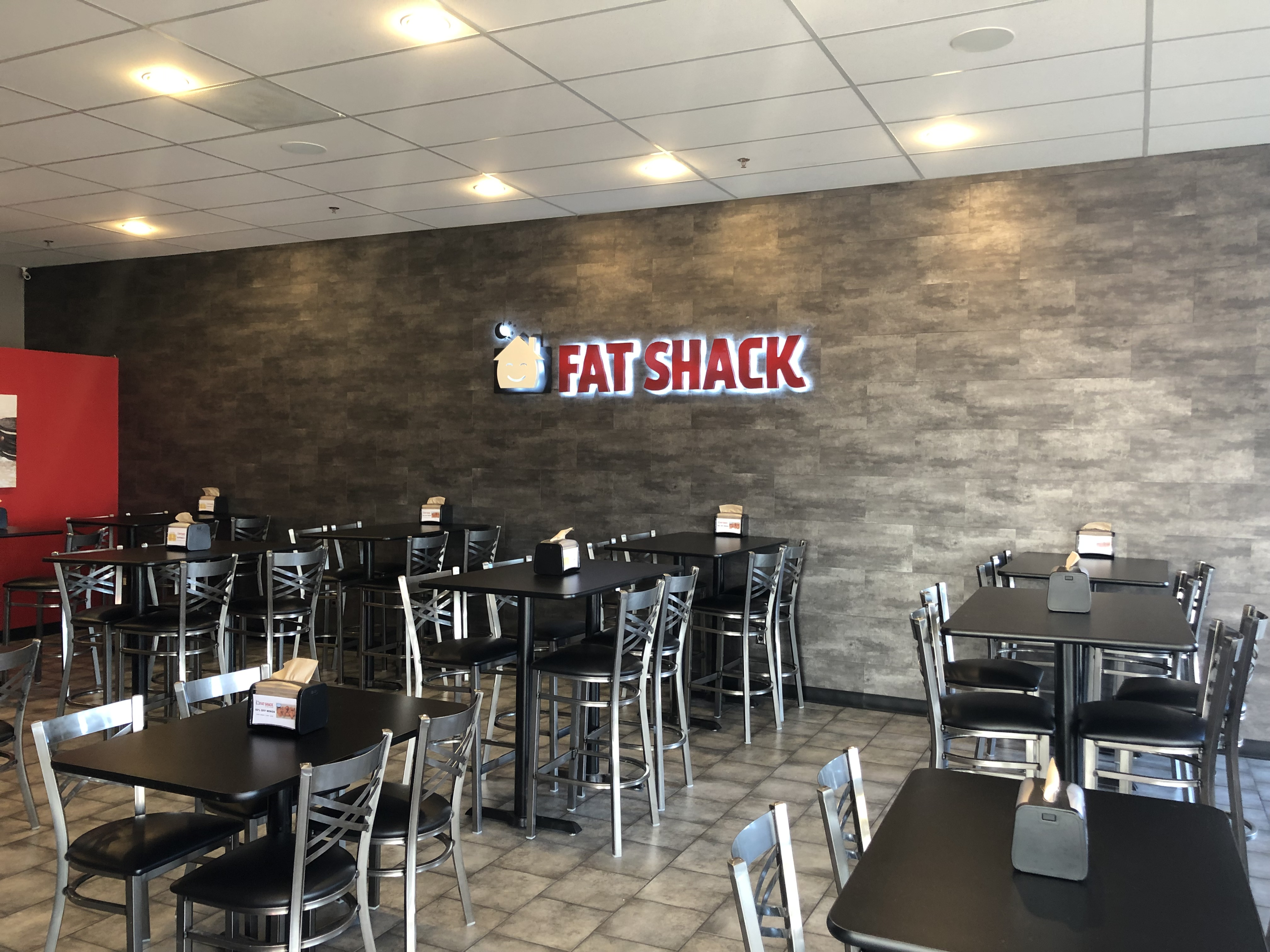
Interior of the Fat Shack location in Wheat Ridge, CO

=== Shark Tank appearance ===
In May 2019, Armenti and Gabauer appeared on the Season 10 finale of the ABC program Shark Tank. The sharks were impressed by Fat Shack's $22 million in lifetime sales. The duo struck a deal with investor Mark Cuban for $250,000 for 15% of the company. Overnight, the team received hundreds of franchise requests, and had accumulated over 3,000 within 48 hours of their episode airing.

== Menu ==
From the beginning, the staples of Fat Shack's menu has been their 'Fat Sandwiches', which draw their origins from the Grease trucks at Rutgers University, burgers, deep-fried desserts, chicken wings, and philly cheesesteaks. Other offerings include milkshakes, mozzarella sticks and deep-fried mac and cheese. The restaurants often offer seasonal items such as deep-fried mint Oreos during the month of March. Many offerings surpass daily recommended intake of calories with some ranging upwards of 2,000 Calories.

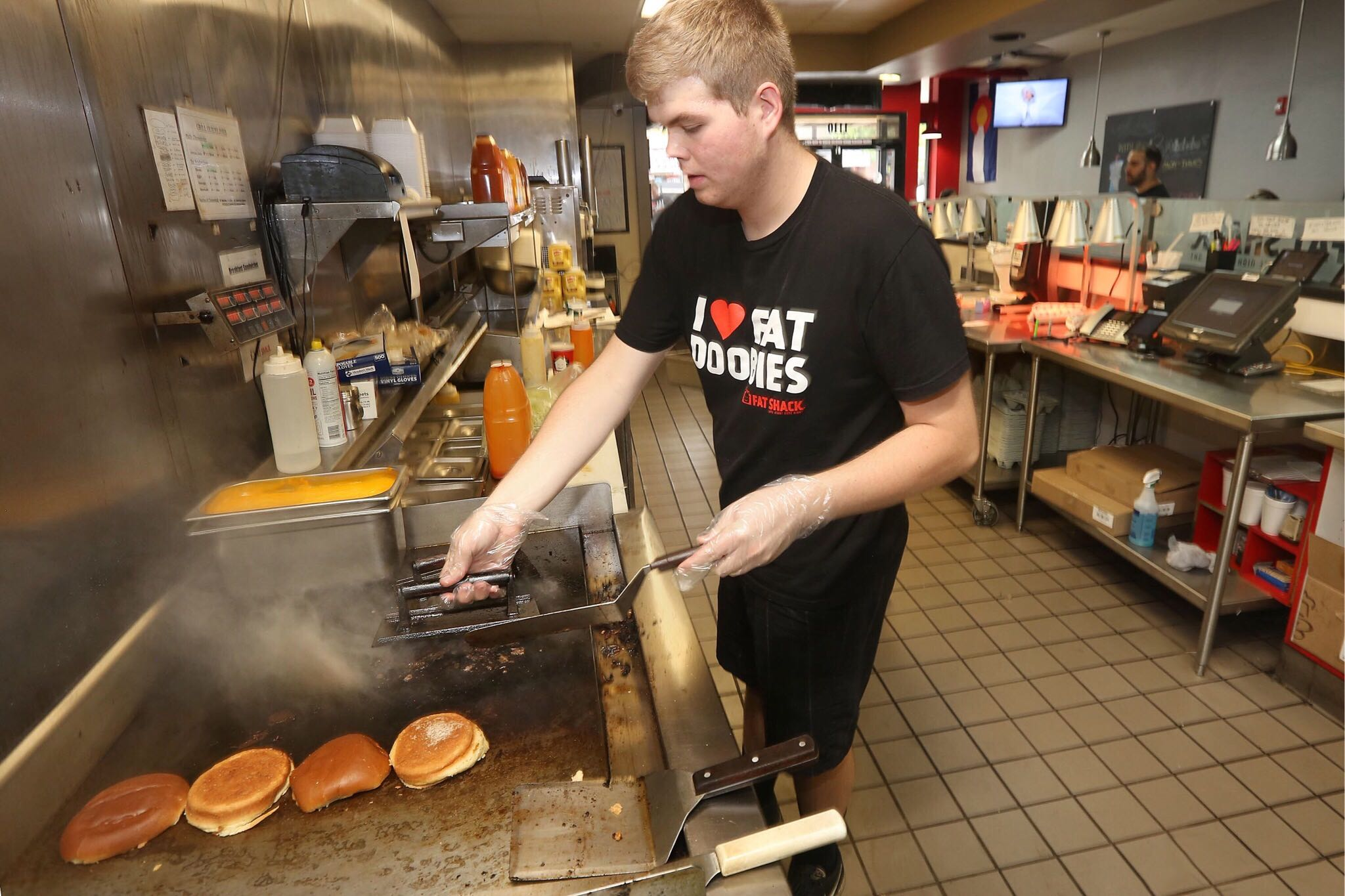
A Fat Shack employee working the grilltop.
