= Operation Dugo =

Annual event in Israel

Operation Dugo מבצע דוגו
- Status: Active
- Date: 18 January
- Frequency: Annually
- Country: Israel
- Inaugurated: January 18, 2016; 10 years ago
- Major events: Eating falafel

Operation Dugo (Hebrew: מבצע דוגו) (Note: The title is sometimes erroneously transliterated as "Operation Dogo", which is written the same way in Hebrew in ktiv hasar niqqud. However, sources with niqqud, such as the cover of the book by Zahava Kor, make the correct pronunciation evident.) is an annual event in Israel that celebrates Holocaust survival and commemorates the death march from the Auschwitz concentration camp by eating falafel on 18 January. This event originates from the personal custom of Holocaust survivor David "Dugo" Leitner, which gained popularity beginning in 2016.

== Background ==
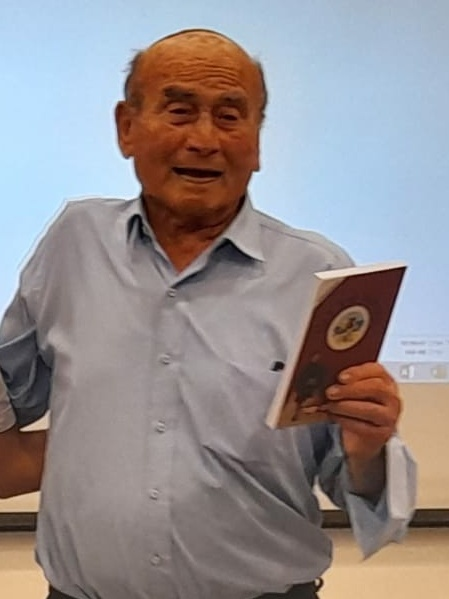
Leitner in 2021

David "Dugo" Leitner was born in Nyíregyháza, Hungary, in 1930, to an orthodox Jewish family of six. Following the German occupation of Hungary in 1944, his family was transferred to the Nyíregyháza ghetto in March 1944, and deported to the Auschwitz concentration camp six weeks later, in May 1944. On 12 January 1945, the Soviet army began its Vistula–Oder offensive, advancing on occupied Poland and approaching Auschwitz. Between 17 and 21 January, the SS forced approximately 56,000 prisoners from Auschwitz and its subcamps to march. An estimated 9,000 to 15,000 prisoners died during these marches.

Leitner, only 15 years old at the time, was marched out of Auschwitz on 18 January. During the march, he drew strength from his mother's tales of round bilkelach, golden-brown dough balls popular among Central European Jews, which she described as growing on trees in the Land of Israel. Leitner survived the march and was transferred to Mauthausen concentration camp and later to the Gunskirchen subcamp, where he was eventually liberated. After immigrating to Israel in 1949, he visited the Mahane Yehuda Market and saw frying falafel balls, which reminded him of the bilkelach from his mother's stories. He resolved to eat two portions of falafel every year on 18 January.

Leitner was a founding member of Nir Galim. He died on Tisha B'Av in 2023 at the age of 93.

== Popularization ==
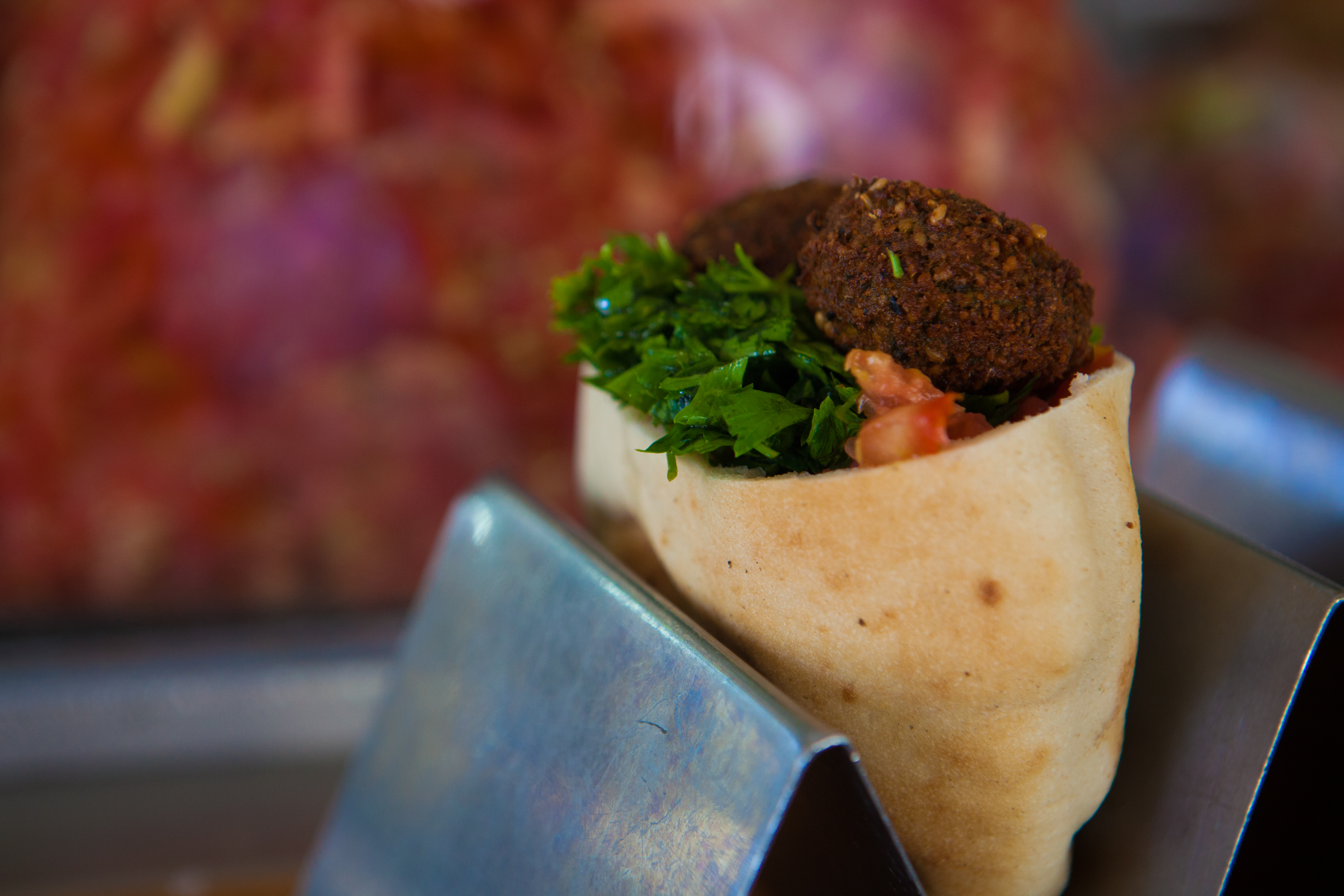
A typical Israeli falafel portion in pita

For many years, Leitner observed his personal custom in solitude, eating a double portion (Note: The number of portions Leitner used to have is unclear. Davar says multiple portions ("מנות"). Srugim ("מנה") and Lidor ("a porion") say a singular portion. Jlife says "as much falafel as he can". However, most source, such as Jeffay ("not one, but two portions of falafel"), Ross ("double portion"), Israel Hayom ("מנה כפולה"), Maariv ("שתי מנות") and another Srugim source ("2 מנות") name two portions. Channel 13 says that "in the past, he could eat more than 3 portions of falafel by himself, but in recent years he has been eating just one" ("בעבר היה יכול לאכול יותר מ-3 מנות פלאפל לבד, אך בשנים האחרונות הוא אוכל אחת").) of falafel near Nir Galim. Over time, family and friends joined him, eventually drawing hundreds of participants, including the entire population of Nir Galim.

In 2016, his daughter, Zahava Kor, who had written a book about his story in 2005, collaborated with the Nir Galim Testimony House to launch Operation Dugo. The public was encouraged to eat falafel, take photos, and share them on social networks. Since then, the initiative has expanded to include various sectors, such as the Israel Prison Service, government offices, workplaces, and embassies, which serve falafel on this day, as well as many schools in Israel and worldwide that observe the day by studying the death marches. In 2024, Speaker of the Knesset Amir Ohana announced that a special falafel stand will be set up at the Knesset every 18 January in memory of Leitner, and the Knesset cafeteria marked a decade of participation in 2025.

Jewish communities worldwide also participate. The embassy of Israel in Warsaw gave away hundreds of portions to mark the day in 2021, as did the embassy of Israel in London in 2023, donating falafel to homeless people around the city.

Among the people who personally shared a falafel with Leitner are president Reuven Rivlin in 2019, Chief of Staff Aviv Kohavi in 2020, and president Isaac Herzog in 2023.
