= The Voice Israel season 2 =

The Voice Israel
- Season 2
- Hosted by: Michael Aloni
- Coaches: Shlomi Shabat; Aviv Geffen; Shlomi Bracha & Yuval Banay; Sarit Hadad
- Winner: Lina Makhul
- Winning mentor: Shlomi Shabat
- Runner-up: Ofir Ben Shitrit
- Finals venue: Nokia Arena

Release
- Original network: Channel 2 (Reshet)
- Original release: 12 December 2012 – 23 March 2013

Season chronology
- ← Previous; Season 1

The Voice Israel (Season 2) is the second season of the reality show The Voice Israel, which focuses on finding the next Israeli pop star. It is hosted by Michael Aloni with coaches Shlomi Shabat, Sarit Hadad, Aviv Geffen and Mashina. Lina Makhul was declared the winner, with Ofir Ben Shitrit as runner-up.

== Summary of competitors ==
Competitors' table
– Winner
– Runner-up
– 2nd/3rd Runner-up
– Eliminated

Team	Acts					
Shlomi Shabat	Adam Lahav	Or Ben Atar	Yair Levi	Annaelle Valensi	Niv Mantzur	Lina Makhul
Aviv Geffen	Manaar Shav	Yael Shoshana Cohen	May Cohen	Sahar Sharav	Ronnie Perry	Ofir Ben Shitrit
Sarit Hadad	Mazi Haliva	Hai Eilon	Yehuda Mimran	Misha Soukhinin	Ahtaliyah Pierce	Dana Zalah
Yuval Banay and Shlomi Bracha	Mike Sela	Lusil Blekherman	Assaf Gad Hanun	Daniella Millo	Dan Salomon	Rudi Bainesay

== Result Tables ==
=== The Blind Auditions ===
Key	Coach hit his or her "I WANT YOU" button	Contestant eliminated with no coach pressing his or her "I WANT YOU" button	Contestant defaulted to this coach's team	Contestant elected to join this coach's team

==== Episode 1 ====
The coaches performed "אין מקום אחר" (Mashina song) at the start of the show.

Order	Contestant	Song	Coaches' and Contestants' Choices			
Order	Contestant	Song	Shlomi	Aviv	Sarit	Yuval and Shlomi
1	Ahtaliyah Pierce	"Price Tag"	—	—		—
2	Dana Zalah	"בלדה לנאיבית"	—			—
3	Diana Dabush	"נגעה בשמים"	—	—	—	—
4	Lusil Blekherman	"Jar of Hearts"				
5	Yehuda Mimran	"יש לך"		—		
6	Annaelle Valensi	"One of Us"		—		

==== Episode 2 ====
Order	Contestant	Song	Coaches' and Contestants' Choices			
Order	Contestant	Song	Shlomi	Aviv	Sarit	Yuval and Shlomi
1	Mike Sela	"Drops of Jupiter"	—	—	—	
2	Ofir Ben Shitrit	"עוד מחכה לאחד"				—
3	Yaniv Con	"Everybody Hurts"	—	—	—	—
4	Sharon Golabri	"נגעת לי בלב"	—	—		—
5	Lior Weinberg	"Going to a Town"	—	—	—	—
6	Sahar Zaaimi	"נגד הרוח"				
7	Rudi Bainesay	"Natural Woman"				

==== Episode 3 ====
Order	Contestant	Song	Coaches' and Contestants' Choices			
Order	Contestant	Song	Shlomi	Aviv	Sarit	Yuval and Shlomi
1	Ortal Uziel	"Born This Way"		—	—	
2	Mike Jade	"Titanium"				
3	Manar Shehab	"Unfaithful"			—	
4	Or Ben Atar	"צלצולי פעמונים"		—		—
5	Raanan Krietzberg	"Where the Wild Roses Grow"	—	—	—	—
6	Mazi Haliva	"כל נדרי"		—		—
7	Anael Flaisher	"You've Got a Friend"	—	—	—	—
8	Hai Eilon	"תגידי"		—		—
9	Yael Shoshana Cohen	"Video Games"				

==== Episode 4 ====
Order	Contestant	Song	Coaches' and Contestants' Choices			
Order	Contestant	Song	Shlomi	Aviv	Sarit	Yuval and Shlomi
1	Niv Mantzur	"שובי לביתך"			—	—
2	Noaa Margalit	"Born This Way"	—	—	—	
3	Gil Mantzur	"מכתב לאחי"	—	—	—	—
4	Ronnie Perry	"Supergirl"	—			
5	Adam Lahav	"Angels"		—	—	—
6	Nofar Mordechayeb	"מרוץ החיים"		—	—	—
7	Misha Soukhinin	"האהבה מתה"		—		—
8	Daria Vered	"Don't Know Why"	—	—	—	—
9	Rani and Sagi	"Suspicious Minds"	—	—		

==== Episode 5 ====
Order	Contestant	Song	Coaches' and Contestants' Choices			
Order	Contestant	Song	Shlomi	Aviv	Sarit	Yuval and Shlomi
1	May Cohen	"My Immortal"	—			—
2	Yuval Ben David	"חתיכת שמיים"	—	—	—	—
3	Nofar Cohen	"Wishing On A Star"		—		—
4	Shay Amar	"מהרי נא"	—	—	—	—
5	Dafna Shilon	"שושנים עצובות"			—	—
6	Dan Salomon	"מתי נתנשק"	—	—		
7	Assaf Gad Hanun	"love song"	—	—	—	
8	Lina Makhul	"Empire State Of Mind"				

==== Episode 6 ====
Order	Contestant	Song	Coaches' and Contestants' Choices			
Order	Contestant	Song	Shlomi	Aviv	Sarit	Yuval and Shlomi
1	Amir Darzy	"I Want to Break Free"				
2	Noaa Barel	"דמעות"	—	—		—
3	Yair Levi	"איזה יום"		—		—
4	Morin Asraf	"Born This Way"	—	—	—	
5	Sahar Sharav	"נגעת לי בלב"	—			—
6	Yoav Felus	"אהוב יקר"	—	—	—	—
7	Noaa Danay	"I'm Yours"			—	
8	Ala Daka	"Time of Your Life"	—	—	—	—
9	Daniella Millo	"The Fear"				

==== Episode 7 ====
Order	Contestant	Song	Coaches' and Contestants' Choices			
Order	Contestant	Song	Shlomi	Aviv	Sarit	Yuval and Shlomi
1	Yuval Zederman	"את לא כמו כולם"	—	—	—	
2	Maya Yohana Menachem	"River"				—
3	Alex Litbek	"רד מעל מסך הטלוויזיה"	—	—	—	—
4	Susanna Bobies	"רואה לך בעיניים"	—	—	—	
5	Asaf Yaakov	"מלאת אהבה"		—	—	
6	Timor Vezena	"אבסורד"		—		—
7	Tzlil Calipi	"סוף שבוע בפריז"		—		—
8	Hadar Saydof	"Time After Time"		—	—	—

==== Episode 8 ====
Order	Contestant	Song	Coaches' and Contestants' Choices			
Order	Contestant	Song	Shlomi	Aviv	Sarit	Yuval and Shlomi
1	Sivan Benham	"I'm Outta Love"	—N/a	—		—
2	Noam Leshem	"Video Games"	—N/a		—	—
3	Gilad Tzarom	"דרך ארוכה"	—N/a	—N/a		—
4	Noa Kardud	"עכשיו הכל בסדר"	—N/a	—N/a	—N/a	—
5	Sagi Seri	"אל תלכי מכאן"	—N/a	—N/a	—N/a	—
6	Tzahi Alush	"נפלת חזק"	—N/a	—N/a	—N/a	

==== Episode 8: Extra Round ====
Order	Contestant	Song	Coaches' and Contestants' Choices			
Order	Contestant	Song	Shlomi	Aviv	Sarit	Yuval and Shlomi
7	Eial Glas	"Hometown Glory"	—	—	—	—
8	Hila Zharur	"Hymn to Her"	—	—	—	—
9	Coral Davidian	"טיפה טיפה"	—	—	—	—
10	Noam Maimon	"עד יום מותי"		—		

=== Episode 9: before the battles ===
episode before the battles

=== Episodes 10–15: Battle Rounds ===
– Battle Winner

Week/Order	Coach	Contestant	Contestant	Song
1.1	Yuval and Shlomi	Noa Margalit	Lusil Blekherman	"Call Me"
1.2	Sarit Hadad	Yehuda Mimran	Gilad Tzarom	"איזו מדינה"
1.3	Aviv Geffen	Maya Yohana Menachem	Yael Shshana Cohen	"Wild Horses"
1.4	Shlomi Shabat	Annaelle Valensi	Ortal Uzial	"Une Belle Histoire"
2.1	Aviv Geffen	Amir Darzi	May Cohen	"Everybody's Got to Learn Sometime"
2.2	Shlomi Shabat	Adam Lahav	Noa Danay	"בכל מקום"
2.3	Yuval and Shlomi	Rani and Sagi	Dan Salomon	"מי מפחד מגברת לוין"
2.4	Sarit Hadad	Ahtaliyah Pierce	Nofar Cohen	"Lady Marmalade"
3.1	Yuval and Shlomi	Yuval Zedarman	Mike Sela	"Sex on fire"
3.2	Shlomi Shabat	Lina Makhul	Hadar Saidof	"with or without you"
3.3	Aviv Geffen	Sahar Azimi	Sahar Sharav	"עורי עור"
3.4	Sarit Hadad	Misha Soukhinin	Sivan Behnam	"ילד אסור ילד מותר"
4.1	Shlomi Shabat	Asaf Yaakov	Niv Mantzur	"גשם"
4.2	Aviv Geffen	Manar Shehab	Mike Jade	"We Are The People"
4.3	Sarit Hadad	Sharon Golarabi	Dana Zalah	"אני חיה לי מיום ליום "
4.4	Yuval and Shlomi	Rudi Bainesay	Morin Asraf	"Killing Me Softly"
5.1	Aviv Geffen	Dafna Shilon	Ofir Ben Shitrit	"עטור מצחך"
5.2	Sarit Hadad	Hai Eilon	Noaa Barel	"לתת ולקחת"
5.3	Shlomi Shabat	Nofar Mordechayeb	Yair Levi	"האיש ההוא"
5.4	Yuval and Shlomi	Daniella Millo	Susanna Bobies	"Suddenly I See"
6.1	Yuval and Shlomi	Tzahi Alush	Assaf Gad Hanun	"בלילות של ירח מלא"
6.2	Sarit Hadad	Mazi Haliva	Tzlil Calipi	"מכל האהבות"
6.3	Aviv Geffen	Noam Leshem	Ronnie Perry	"Black Hole Sun"
6.4	Shlomi Shabat	Or Ben Atar	Noam Maymon; Timor Vezena	"פרי גנך"

=== Episodes 16–17: Top 24 ===
At this stage of the competition, each mentor chose the contestants from his team to move on to the Top 20. However, the others mentors had the opportunity to press their "My Voice" button while the fourth mentor's contestant was singing. A contestants who all the others mentors gave him "their voice" moved on automatically to the Top 20.

Key	Coach hit his or her "My Voice" button	Contestant eliminated by his or her coach	Contestant moved automatically to Top 20

==== Sarit Team ====
Order	Contestant	Song	Coaches' Choices		
Order	Contestant	Song	Shlomi	Aviv	Yuval and Shlomi
1	Misha Soukhinin	"Toxic"		—	
2	Yehuda Mimran	"ללכת שבי אחריך"		—	
3	Hai Eilon	"עדיין ריק"	—	—	—
4	Ahtaliyah Pierce	"If I were a boy"			
5	Dana Zalah	"Rehab"		—	
6	Mezi Chaliva	"הכל זה לטובה"	—	—	—

==== Yuval and Shlomi Team ====
Order	Contestant	Song	Coaches' Choices		
Order	Contestant	Song	Shlomi	Aviv	Sarit
1	Lusil Blekherman	"אוהבת לא אוהבת"		—	—
2	Daniella Millo	"Son of a Preacher Man"		—	
3	Mike Sela	"Iris"	—	—	—
4	Dan Salomon	"מונסון"			
5	Assaf Gad Hanun	"Somebody Told Me"			
6	Rudi Bainesay	"Let It Be"		—	

==== Shlomi Team ====
Order	Contestant	Song	Coaches' Choices		
Order	Contestant	Song	Aviv	Sarit	Yuval and Shlomi
1	Annaelle Valensi	"והיא שעמדה"			
2	Or Ben Atar	"ילדות נשכחת"		—	—
3	Niv Mantzur	"זה קורה"			
4	Yair Levi	"חלון לים התיכון"			
5	Adam Lahav	"גאולה"	—	—	—
6	Lina Makhul	"שיר אהובת הספן"	—		

==== Aviv Team ====
Order	Contestant	Song	Coaches' Choices		
Order	Contestant	Song	Shlomi	Sarit	Yuval and Shlomi
1	Sahar Sharav	"זמן של מספרים"			
2	Ronnie Perry	"Space Oddity"			
3	Manar Shehab	"Seven Nation Army"	—	—	
4	Yael Shoshana Cohen	"La Via en rose"		—	
5	May Cohen	"Unintended"	—	—	—
6	Ofir Ben Shitrit	"עד שתעזוב"			

=== Episodes 18–19: Top 20 - "Going to the Edge" ===
Each mentor chose the contestants from his team to move on to the Top 16, with the same "My Voice" button switch.

Key	Coach hit his or her "My Voice" button	Contestant eliminated by his or her coach	Contestant moved automatically to Top 16

==== Sarit Team ====
Order	Contestant	Song	Coaches' Choices		
Order	Contestant	Song	Shlomi	Aviv	Yuval and Shlomi
1	Yehuda Mimran	"תמיד אהבה"		—	—
2	Ahtaliyah Pierce	"למה"			—
3	Dana Zalah	"Like a Prayer"	—	—	—
4	Misha Soukhinin	"תני לי יד"	—	—	—
5	Hai Eilon	"אלייך"	—	—	—

==== Aviv Team ====
Order	Contestant	Song	Coaches' Choices		
Order	Contestant	Song	Shlomi	Sarit	Yuval and Shlomi
1	Sahar Sharav	"מביאה הכל לידי דמעות"			—
2	Ronnie Perry	"בדד"			
3	Yael Shoshana Cohen	"תחרות כלבים"	—	—	
4	May Cohen	"Wish You Were Here"	—	—	—
5	Ofir Ben Shitrit	"קטנתי"			—

==== Yuval and Shlomi Team ====
Order	Contestant	Song	Coaches' Choices		
Order	Contestant	Song	Shlomi	Aviv	Sarit
1	Lusil Blekherman	"Free Your Mind"	—	—	—
2	Daniella Millo	"Bizarre Love Triangle"			
3	Dan Salomon	"לראות אותה היום"			
4	Assaf Gad Hanun	"Always On My Mind"			—
5	Rudi Bainesay	"מודה אני"		—	

==== Shlomi Team ====
Order	Contestant	Song	Coaches' Choices		
Order	Contestant	Song	Aviv	Sarit	Yuval and Shlomi
1	Niv Mantzur	"אהבה"	—	—	
2	Annaelle Valensi	"שיר תקווה"	—		
3	Or Ben Atar	"ניגונה של השכונה"	—		—
4	Yair Levi	"באה אליכם"	—	—	—
5	Lina Makhul	"Feuilles Mortes"			

=== Episodes 20–21: Top 16 - "The Coaches' Songs" ===
The contestants had to sing songs which are originally performed by the other mentors. Each mentor chose the contestants from their team to move on to the Top 12, without the twist of "My Voice" button.

Key	Contestant eliminated by his or her coach

Sarit Team
Order	Contestant	Song	Originally by
1	Misha Soukhinin	"שלג צח"	Mashina
2	Yehuda Mimran	"ואהבנו"	Aviv Geffen
3	Dana Zalah	"אנה"	Mashina
4	Ahtaliyah Pierce	"אבא"	Shlomi Shabat

Shlomi Team
Order	Contestant	Song	Originally by
1	Niv Mantzur	"תחזור תחזור"	Mashina
2	Annaelle Valensi	"הייתי בגן עדן"	Sarit Hadad
3	Yair Levi	"סוף העולם"	Aviv Geffen
4	Lina Makhul	"מקסיקו"	Aviv Geffen

Yuval and Shlomi Team
Order	Contestant	Song	Originally by
1	Assaf Gad Hanun	"סופרסטאר"	Aviv Geffen
2	Daniella Millo	"תחזרי, תחזרי"	Sarit Hadad
3	Rudi Bainesay	"שירה של לילה"	Sarit Hadad
4	Dan Salomon	"יוצא לדרך"	Shlomi Shabat

Aviv Team
Order	Contestant	Song	Originally by
1	May Cohen	"ברחובות שלנו"	Mashina
2	Sahar Sharav	"לכל אחד"	Shlomi Shabat
3	Ofir Ben Shitrit	"כשהלב בוכה"	Sarit Hadad
4	Ronnie Perry	"הכוכבים דולקים על אש קטנה"	Mashina

=== Episodes 22–23: Top 12 - Quarter finals ===
The Top 8 contestants to move on to the semi-finals were chosen only by the audience's votes.

Key	Contestant eliminated by the audience

Yuval and Shlomi Team
Order	Contestant	Song
1	Daniella Millo	"Redemption Song"
2	Dan Salomon	"עכשיו אני"
3	Rudi Bainesay	"Fallin'"
Group Performance: "It Must Be Love"

Shlomi Team
Order	Contestant	Song
1	Niv Mantzur	"אנצל"
2	Annaelle Valensi	"Torn"
3	Lina Makhul	"California King Bed"
Group Performance: "אין עוד יום"

Sarit Team
Order	Contestant	Song
1	Dana Zalah	"אף אחד לא"
2	Misha Soukhinin	"מעליות"
3	Ahtaliyah Pierce	"Mercy"
Group Performance: "Sweet Dreams"

Aviv Team
Order	Contestant	Song
1	Sahar Sharav	"נשבע"
2	Ronnie Perry	"Nothing Compares to You"
3	Ofir Ben Shitrit	"לא בוכה"
Group Performance: "נאמר כבר הכל"

=== Episodes 24–25: Top 8 - Semi finals ===
The Top 4 contestants to move on to the final were chosen only by the audience's votes.

==== Round 1 - Shlomo Artzi's Songs ====
The contestants sang songs by the Israeli artist Shlomo Artzi.

Sarit Team
Order	Contestant	Song
1	Ahtaliyah Pierce	"לא עוזב את העיר"
2	Dana Zalah	"אחרי הכל את שיר"

Yuval and Shlomi Team
Order	Contestant	Song
1	Dan Salomon	"אני שומע שוב"
2	Rudi Bainesay	"שדות של אירוסים"

Shlomi Team
Order	Contestant	Song
1	Niv Mantzur	"אושר אקספרס"
2	Lina Makhul	"לא יודעת מה עובר לך בראש"

Aviv Team
Order	Contestant	Song
1	Ronnie Perry	"תגידי"
2	Ofir Ben Shitrit	"הרדופים"

==== Round 2 ====
Key	Contestant eliminated by the audience

Shlomi Team
Order	Contestant	Song
1	Niv Mantzur	"עכשיו התור לאהבה"
2	Lina Makhul	"I Will Always Love You"

Sarit Team
Order	Contestant	Song
1	Dana Zalah	"Eternal Flame"
2	Ahtaliyah Pierce	"Turning Tables"

Yuval and Shlomi Team
Order	Contestant	Song
1	Dan Salomon	"ניצוצות"
2	Rudi Bainesay	"Heavy Cross"

Aviv Team
Order	Contestant	Song
1	Ofir Ben Shitrit	"אוהבת אותך עוזבת אותך"
2	Ronnie Perry	"Angie"

=== Episode 26: Top 4 - The final ===
==== Round 1 ====
Order	Contestant	Song	Team
1	Rudi Bainesay	"Nobody's Wife"	Yuval and Shlomi
2	Dana Zalah	"מציאות אחרת"	Sarit Hadad
3	Ofir Ben Shitrit	"אם ננעלו"	Aviv Geffen
4	Lina Makhul	"What a Feeling"	Shlomi Shabat

==== Round 2 - Duets with the coaches ====
Key	Contestant eliminated by the audience

Order	Contestant	Team/Duet	Song
1	Lina Makhul	Shlomi Shabat	"כשאתה"
2	Ofir Ben Shitrit	Aviv Geffen	"אתה פה חסר לי"
3	Dana Zalah	Sarit Hadad	"Where Have You Been"
4	Rudi Bainesay	Yuval and Shlomi	"Lonely Day"

==== Round 3 - The Final Solo ====
Key	Contestant Won The Competition

Order	Contestant	Song	Team
1	Lina Makhul	"Hallelujah"	Shlomi Shabat
2	Ofir Ben Shitrit	"הקיץ האחרון"	Aviv Geffen

=== Episode 27: 20 most loveable performances ===
Place	Contestant	Song	Coach	Level
20	Annaelle Valensi	"והיא שעמדה"	Shlomi Shabat	Top 24
19	Ahtaliyah Pierce	"Price Tag"	Sarit Hadad	Blind Auditions
18	Niv Mantzur	"שובי לביתך"	Shlomi Shabat	Blind Auditions
17	Niv Mantzur & Asaf Yaakov	"גשם"	Shlomi Shabat	The Battles
16	Ahtaliyah Pierce	"If I were a boy"	Sarit Hadad	Top 24
15	Ofir Ben Shitrit & Dafna Shilon	"עטור מצחך"	Aviv Geffen	The Battles
14	Manar Shehab	"Unfaithful"	Aviv Geffen	Blind Auditions
13	Daniella Millo & Susanna Bobies	"Suddenly I See"	Yuval and Shlomi	The Battles
12	Ofir Ben Shitrit	"עד שתעזוב"	Aviv Geffen	Top 24
11	Ronnie Perry	"Supergirl"	Aviv Geffen	Blind Auditions
10	Lina Makhul & Hadar Saidof	"With or Without You"	Shlomi Shabat	The Battles
9	Yael Shoshana Cohen	"Video Games"	Aviv Geffen	Blind Auditions
8	Lusil Blekherman	"Jar of Hearts"	Yuval and Shlomi	Blind Auditions
7	Ahtaliyah Pierce & Nofar Cohen	"Lady Marmalade"	Sarit Hadad	The Battles
6	Lina Makhul	"Feuilles Mortes"	Shlomi Shabat	Top 20
5	Ronnie Perry	"Space Oddity"	Aviv Geffen	Top 24
4	Ofir Ben Shitrit	"עוד מחכה לאחד"	Aviv Geffen	Blind Auditions
3	Annaelle Valensi	"One of Us"	Shlomi Shabat	Blind Auditions
2	Rudi Bainesay	"Natural Woman"	Yuval and Shlomi	Blind Auditions
1	Lina Makhul	"Empire State Of Mind"	Shlomi Shabat	Blind Auditions

==== 3 most loveable performances from the final ====
Place	Contestant	Song	Coach	Round
3	Ofir Ben Shitrit	"הקיץ האחרון"	Aviv Geffen	Round 3 - The Final Solo
2	Lina Makhul	"Hallelujah"	Shlomi Shabat	Round 3 - The Final Solo
1	Ofir Ben Shitrit	"אם ננעלו"	Aviv Geffen	Round 1
