= HELIX (New Brunswick, New Jersey) =

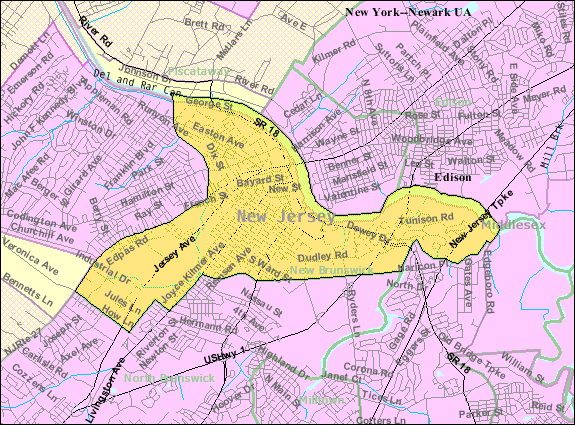
- Location within New Brunswick, NJ Location within New Jersey

General information
- Type: Mixed-use highrise
- Location: New Brunswick, New Jersey, U.S.
- Coordinates: 40.496389°N 74.446389°W
- Completed: 2026 (projected)

Technical details
- Floor count: 13

Design and construction
- Developer: DEVCO

The HELIX Health + Life Science Exchange, originally called The Hub for the New Jersey Innovation and Technology Hub, is a research, business incubator and innovation center under construction in New Brunswick, New Jersey, which itself is called The Hub City and The Healthcare City. It is planned to contain three buildings: H-1, H-2, and H-3.

== Location and buildings ==
The site was formerly the Ferren Mall, which opened in 1982 but became abandoned and was ultimately demolished in 2017. It is across the street from the New Brunswick station, served by NJ Transit's Northeast Corridor Line and several Amtrak trains.

H-1: The first phase of HELIX is a 13-story 574,000 square feet building which will house the New Jersey Innovation HUB, Rutgers Robert Wood Johnson Medical School, and a Rutgers translational research facility. It includes retail space, a 10,000-square-foot market hall with food options and a 3,000-square-foot restaurant that opens onto a 70-foot-wide plaza. Ground was broken on the US$650 million project in October 2021. It is expected to be completed in 2025 Construction began July 2023. It was topped out in September 2024. H-1 is expected to fully open in Fall 2026, with early summer openings of the Strand Market food hall and Clydz, a restaurant formerly located on the HELIX property.

H-2: Designed by HDR, Inc., the second portion of HELIX includes 600,000 square feet of build-to-suit lab and office space. On December 11, 2023 Nokia announced plans to relocate Nokia Bell Labs to the HELIX as the sole tenant of H-2. Construction began August 2025.

H-3: The third phase of the project will include a 42-story mixed used building, including 220 units of housing. The tower is expected to break ground in April 2026 and completed by summer 2028.

== Stakeholders and tenants ==
The New Jersey Economic Development Authority, which provided tax credits, and the New Brunswick Development Corporation (DEVCO) are partners in the project. Part of the project will be dedicated to translational research. Tenants (and potential chip manufacturer) will include:

- BioNJ, New Jersey's largest life sciences association
- Rutgers' Robert Wood Johnson Medical School
- Princeton University
- Atlantic Technological University
- Choose New Jersey
- Hackensack Meridian Health
- RWJBarnabas Health

== See also ==
- List of tallest buildings in New Brunswick
- The Gateway (New Brunswick, New Jersey)
