= The Gateway (New Brunswick, New Jersey) =

Mixed-use tower in New Brunswick, New Jersey

Coordinates: 40.49741°N 74.44775°W

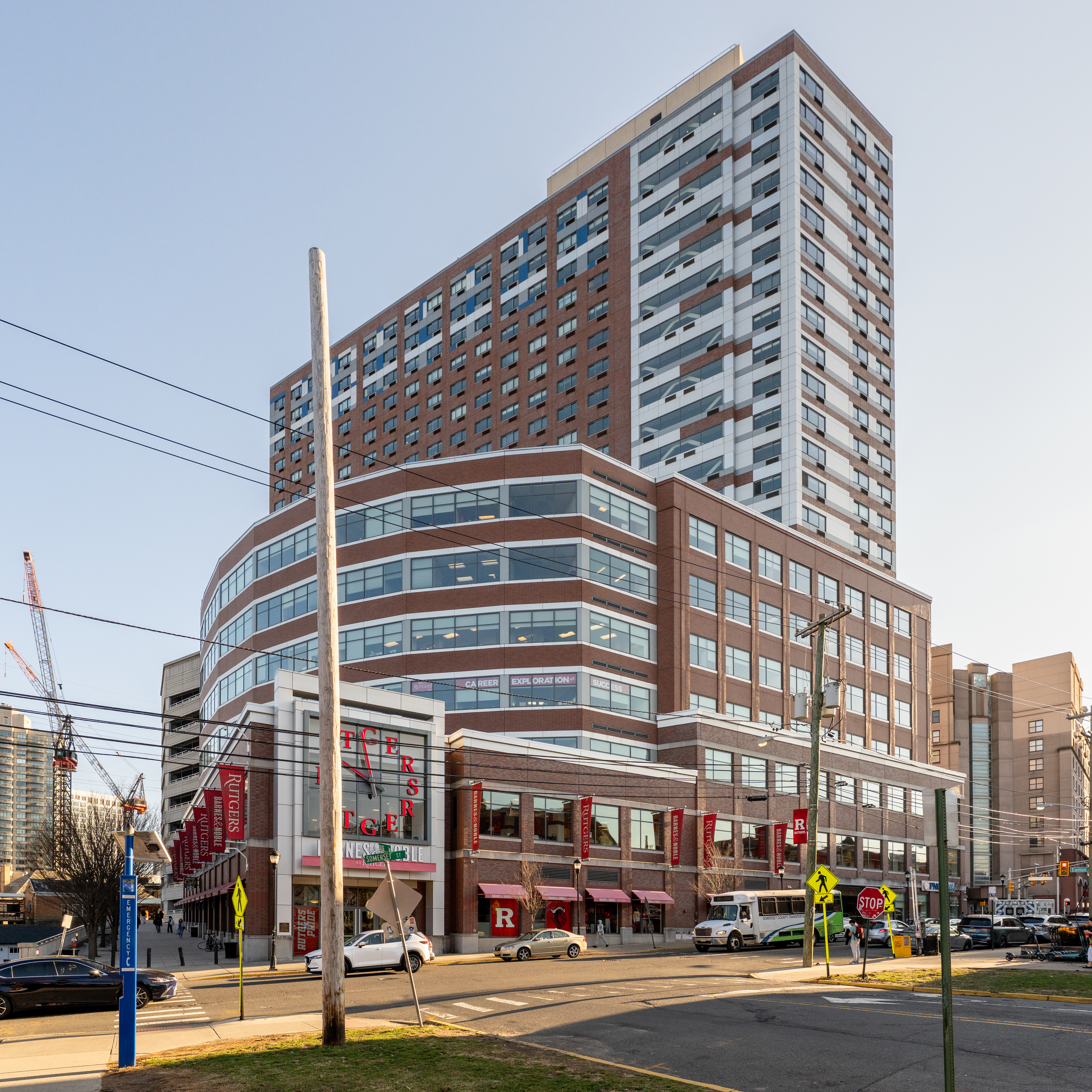

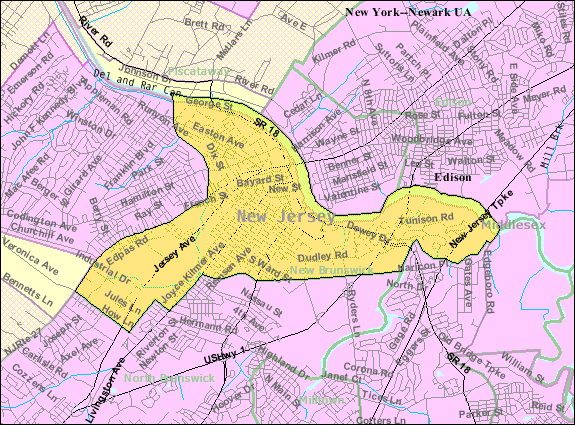
- Location within New Brunswick, NJ The Gateway (New Brunswick, New Jersey) (New Jersey)

General information
- Type: Mixed-use highrise
- Location: New Brunswick, New Jersey
- Completed: 2012

Height
- Roof: 298 ft

Technical details
- Floor count: 23
- Floor area: 623,893 sq. ft

Design and construction
- Developer: DEVCO

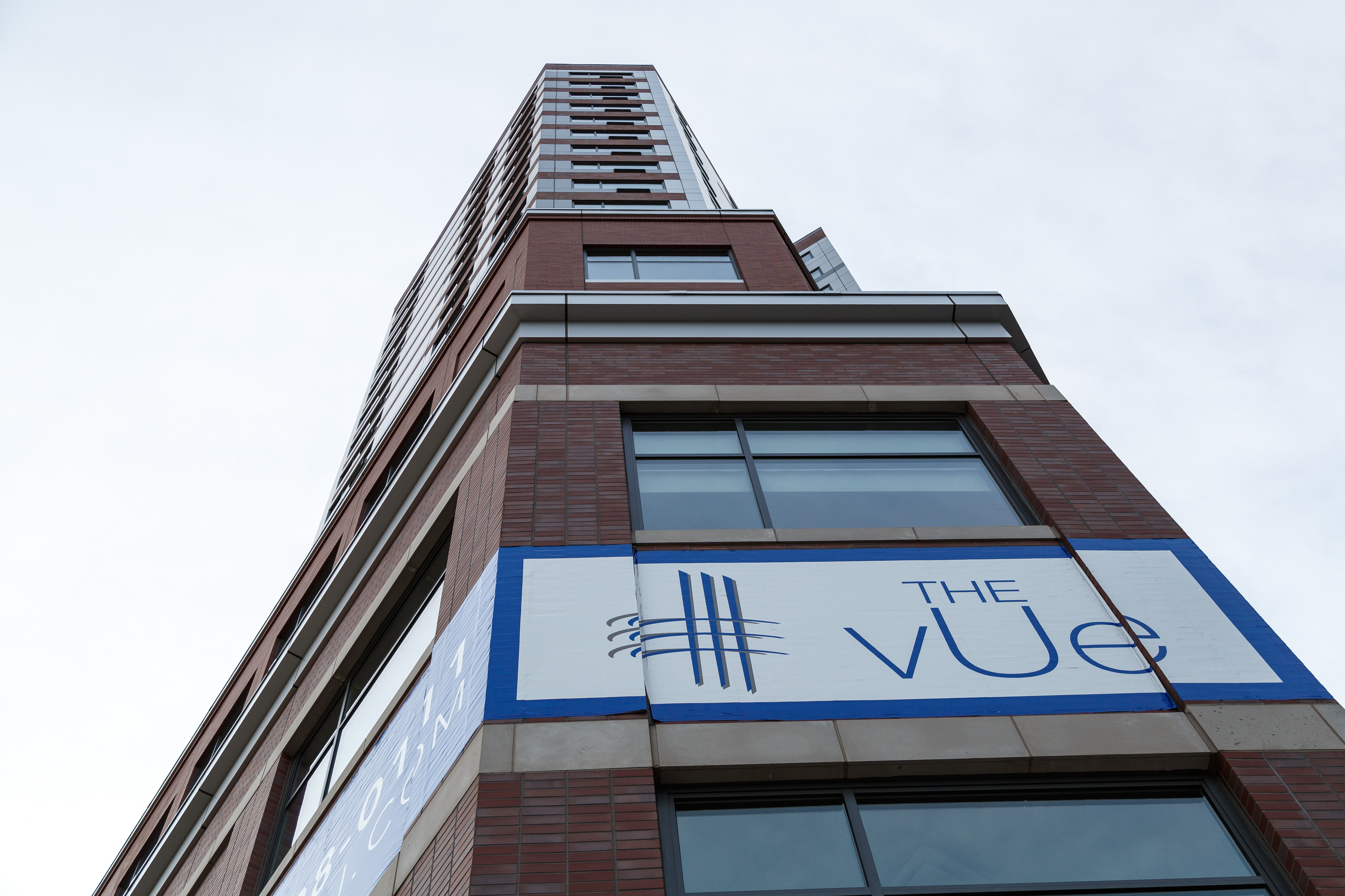
The Vue

The Gateway is a mixed-use tower in New Brunswick, New Jersey, United States, adjacent to the Northeast Corridor Line New Brunswick rail station. It was proposed in February 2005 by DEVCO as part of the Easton-Somerset redevelopment area. Several businesses were relocated from the site during 2008 and 2009. The project was completed in September 2012, at a cost of $150 million.

New Brunswick is one of nine cities in New Jersey designated as eligible for Urban Transit Hub Tax Credits by the state's Economic Development Authority. Developers who invest a minimum of $50 million within 0.5 miles of a train station are eligible for pro-rated tax credit. The Gateway is one such project located just to the north of station and is connected by a new pedestrian bridge. This creates a direct link to the Rutgers' College Avenue Campus.

The completed project is the tallest building in New Brunswick, at 23 stories. A city spokesman described it as "like the center of the universe for people coming to New Brunswick." The Gateway was expected to attract residents and the university community downtown.

The Gateway includes:

- 656 spaces of parking (nine levels)
- A three-story Barnes & Noble store
- New headquarters for the Rutgers University Press
- 42 condos, 120 regular housing units, and 38 affordable housing units (Reduced from 49 units of affordable housing planned in April 2010)

== See also ==
- List of tallest buildings in New Brunswick
- HELIX (New Brunswick, New Jersey)
