= College Avenue Campus =

College campus in New Brunswick, New Jersey, US

Coordinates: 40.486678°N 74.444414°W

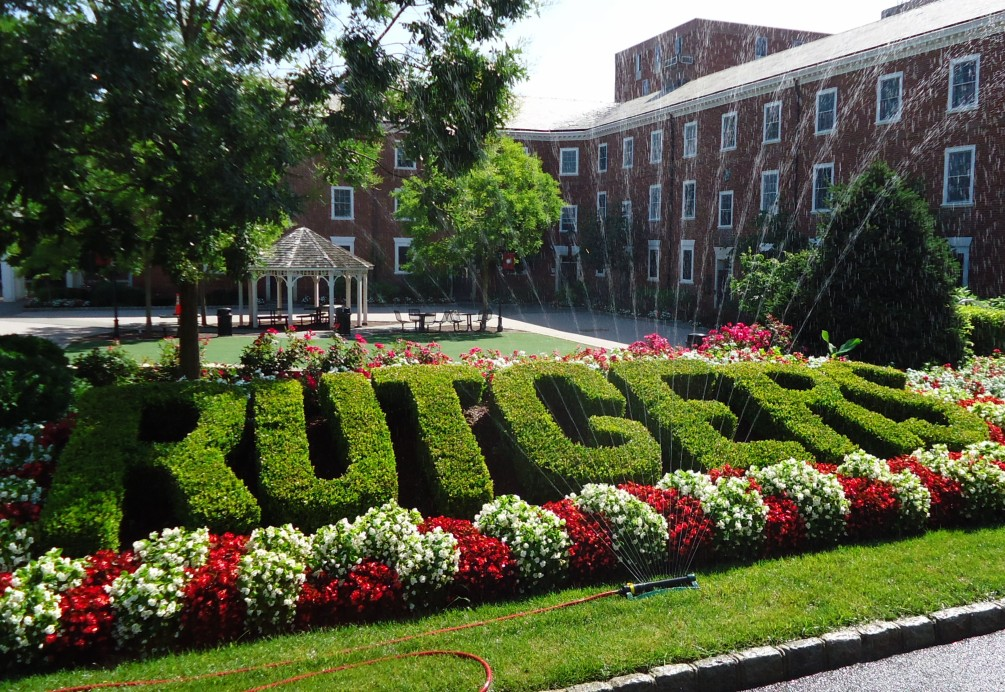

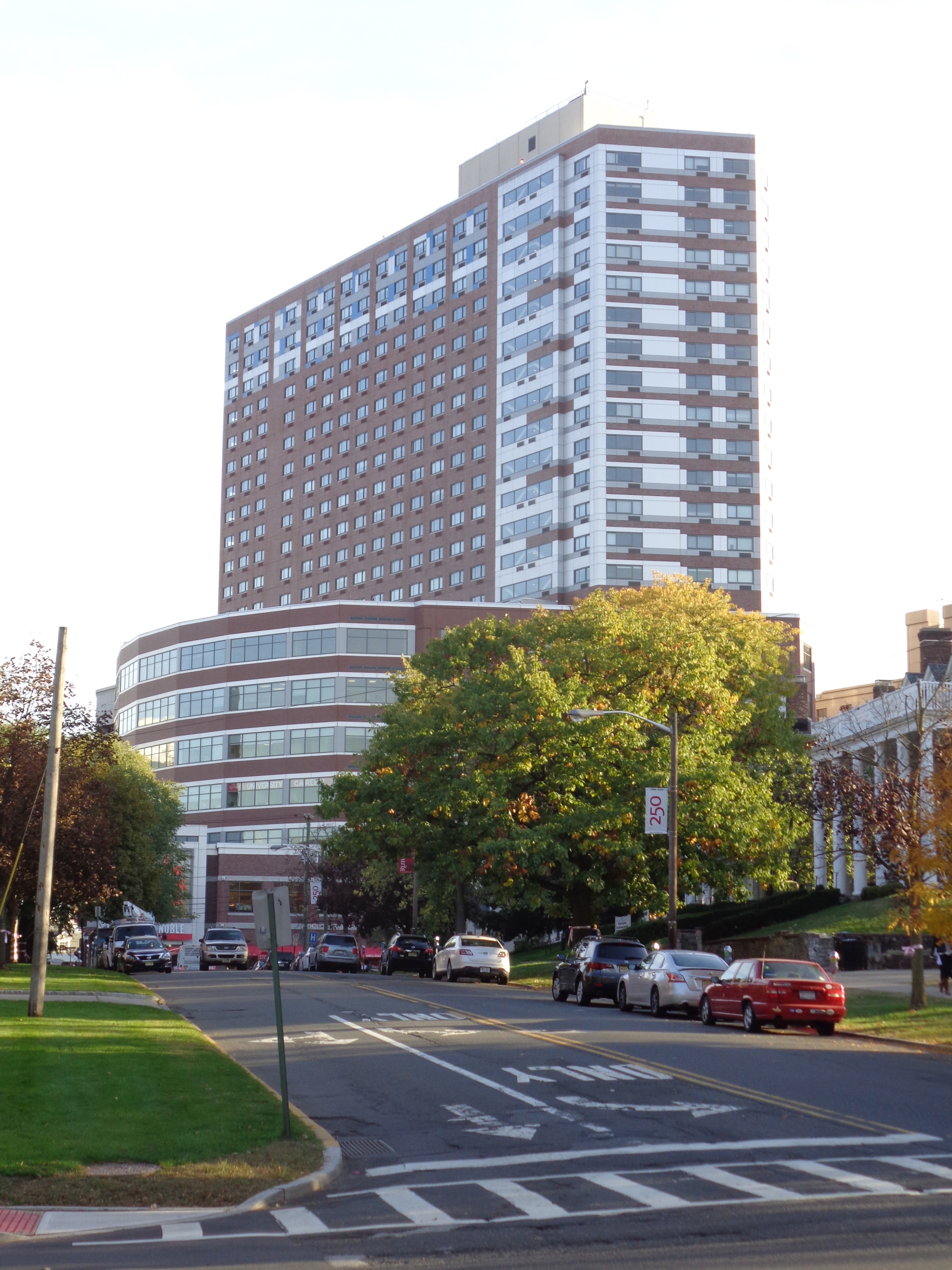
The Gateway

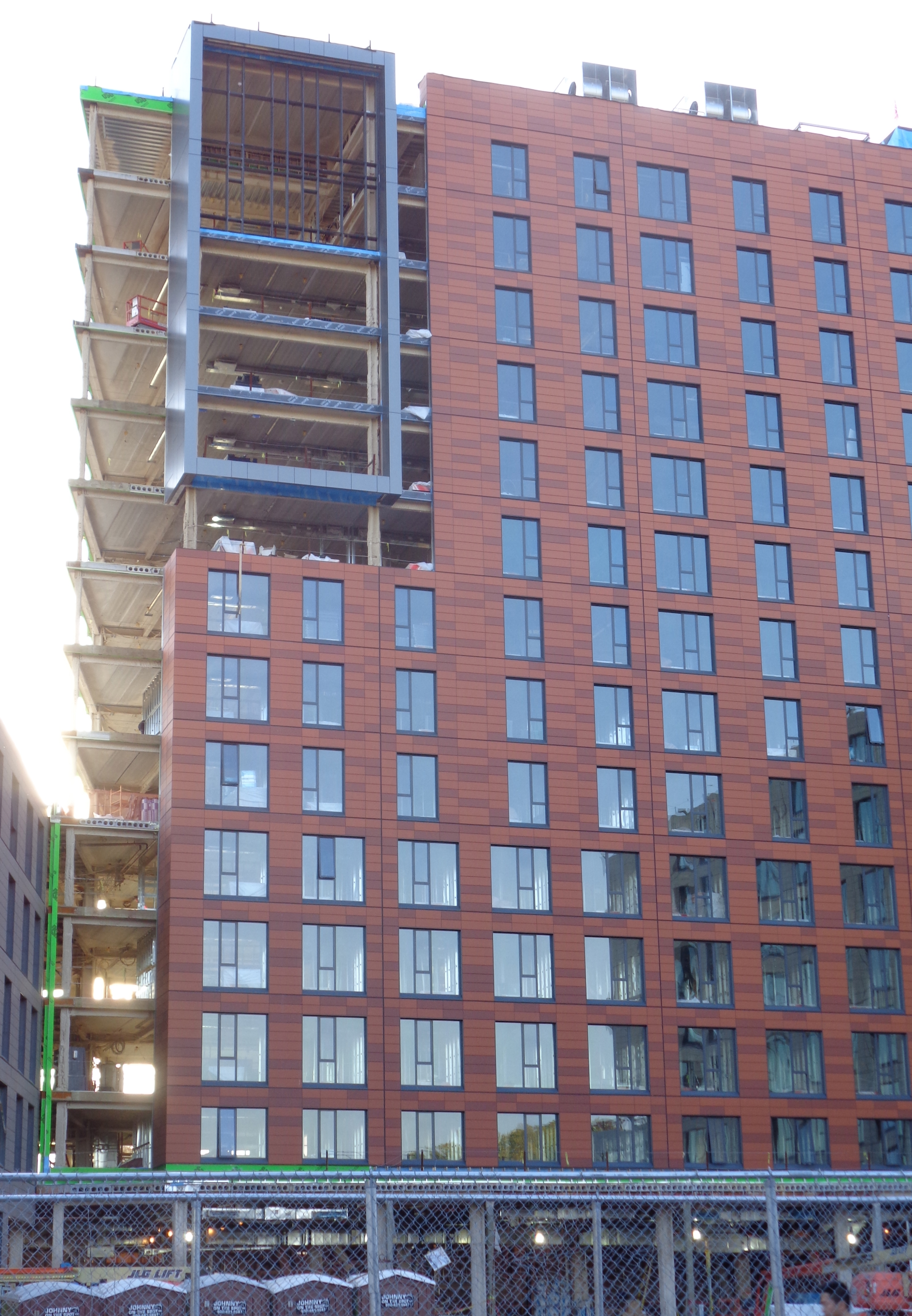
The Yard

College Avenue is the oldest campus of Rutgers University – New Brunswick, in New Brunswick, New Jersey, U.S. It includes the historic seat of the university, known as Old Queens and the campus of the New Brunswick Theological Seminary. Many classes are taught in the Voorhees Mall area, also home to the Zimmerli Art Museum. It is within walking distance of the train station, shops, restaurants, and theaters in downtown New Brunswick, and is served by Rutgers Campus Buses, a zero-fare bus network.

Other campuses at Rutgers–New Brunswick include the Busch Campus, the Livingston Campus and the Cook-Douglass Campus.

== Old Queens ==
The historic heart of College Avenue Campus takes its name from Queen's College, which was the original name of Rutgers.

== Gateway ==
The Gateway is a mixed-use tower at the beginning of College Avenue adjacent with a direct link the Northeast Corridor Line New Brunswick Station. It houses a three-story Barnes & Noble store the headquarters of Rutgers University Press and Scarlet Fever shop.

== The Yard ==
The Yard, designed by Elkus/Manfredi Architects, was built in 2016 to service as central meeting point, or "living room" or "front yard" of the College Avenue Campus. The area features restaurants and housing. The Yard is located on the former Parking Lot #8, which had been home to the Grease trucks.

== River Halls ==
River Halls, known as the River Dorms, are a trio of three residential/classroom buildings. Constructed in the International Style and opened in 1956, they are so called due to their excellent views of the Raritan River. The three buildings, named Campbell, Frelinghuysen, and Hardenbergh, are 38 m (125 ft) tall and are 7 stories high. The buildings were built so as to be raised above street level with open air underneath to preserve sight lines between George Street and the Raritan River. But the open space was largely unused and the interior of the buildings did not have any significant space for study, lounging, or student programming, which led to renovation project in 2014. Hardenbergh Hall was originally designed as the "medical" dorm for Rutgers students who suffered from physical maladies such as asthma, and as such is one of the few dorms on the College Avenue Campus which is air conditioned. It is named after Jacob Rutsen Hardenbergh, who had been the first president of Rutgers College from 1785 to 1790, when it was still called "Queen's College". The classrooms are located on the basement level of all three buildings.

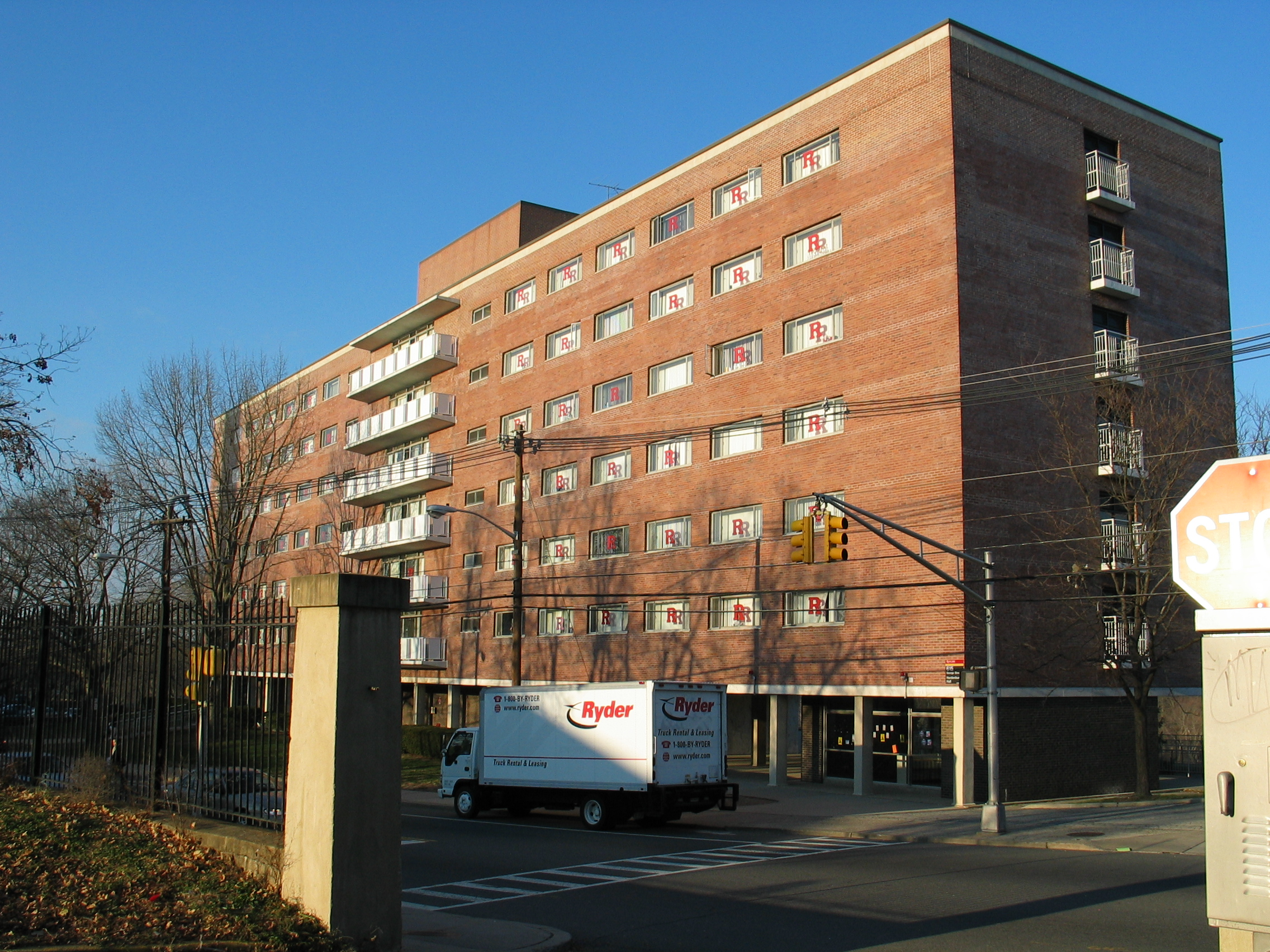
Hardenbergh Hall

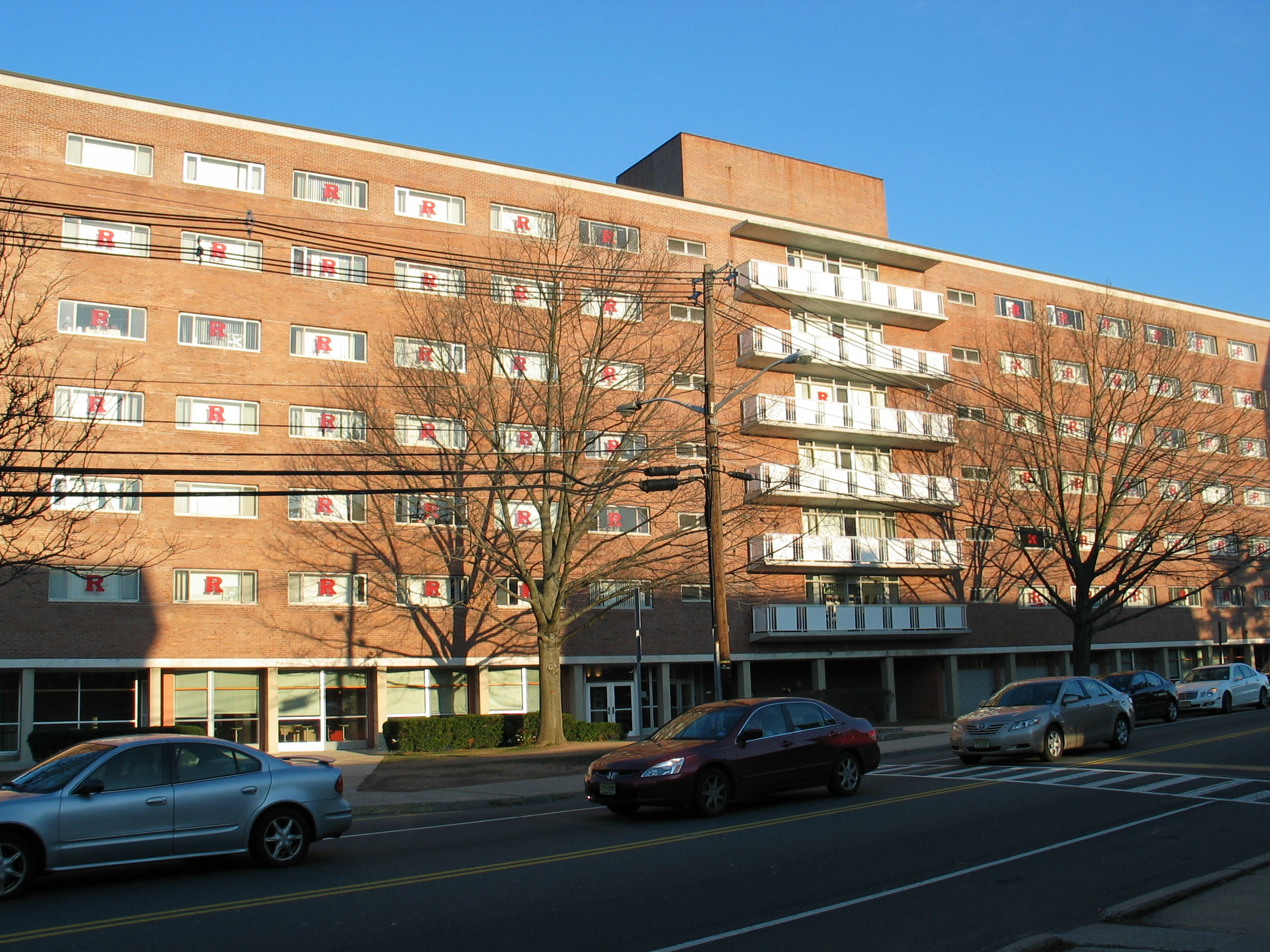
Frelinghuysen Hall

== Honors College ==
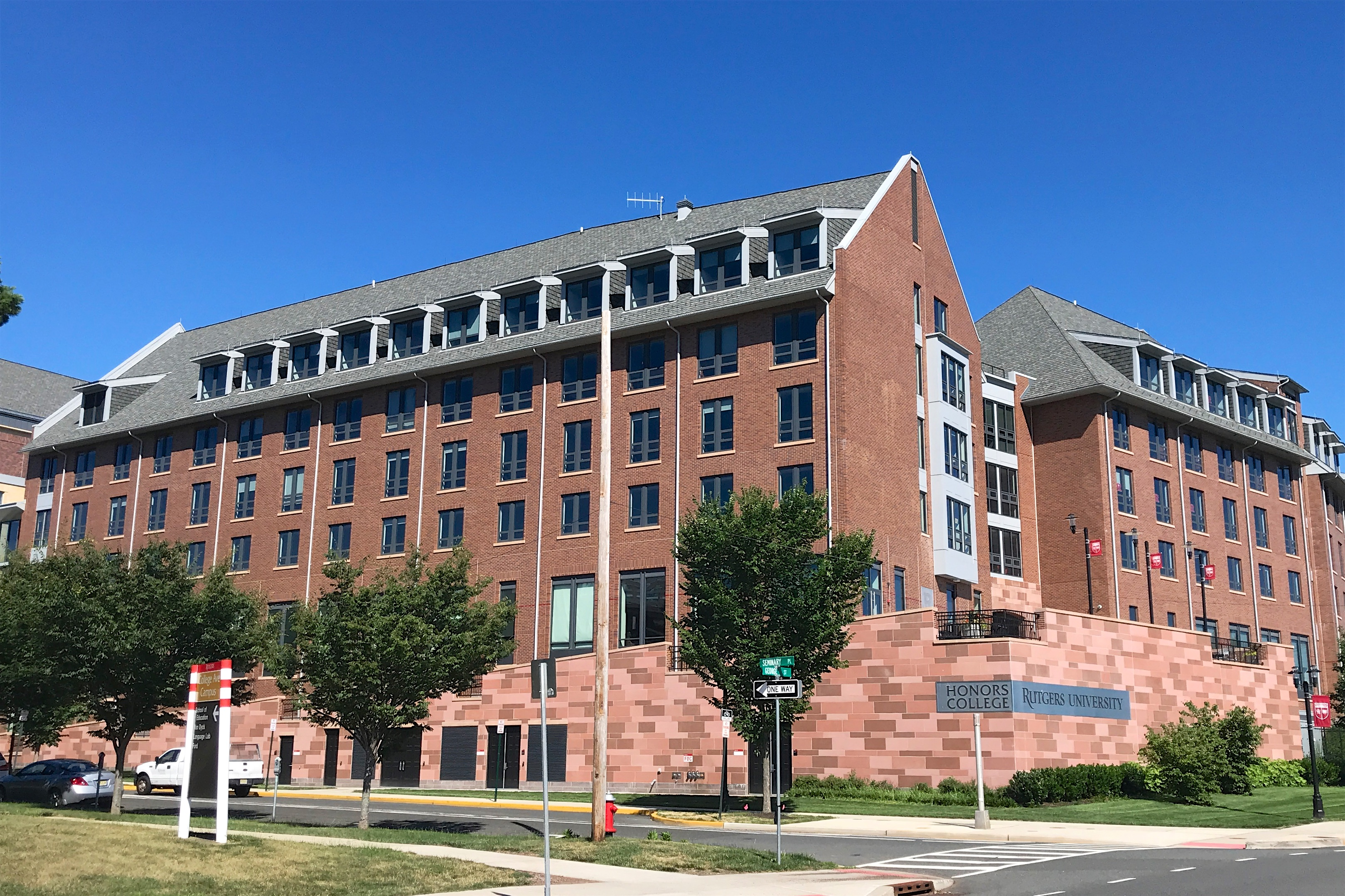
Honors College

A complex for freshmen opened in 2015. The dorm building houses approximately 500 first-year students each year (around 7% of the applicant pool). Centralizing these students beneath one roof supports the mission of the Honors College community: to prepare students for a purposeful career through hands-on learning, collaboration, and interdisciplinary training. Members enjoy substantial scholarships, close connections with professors and advisors, and smaller class sizes.

== Demarest Hall ==
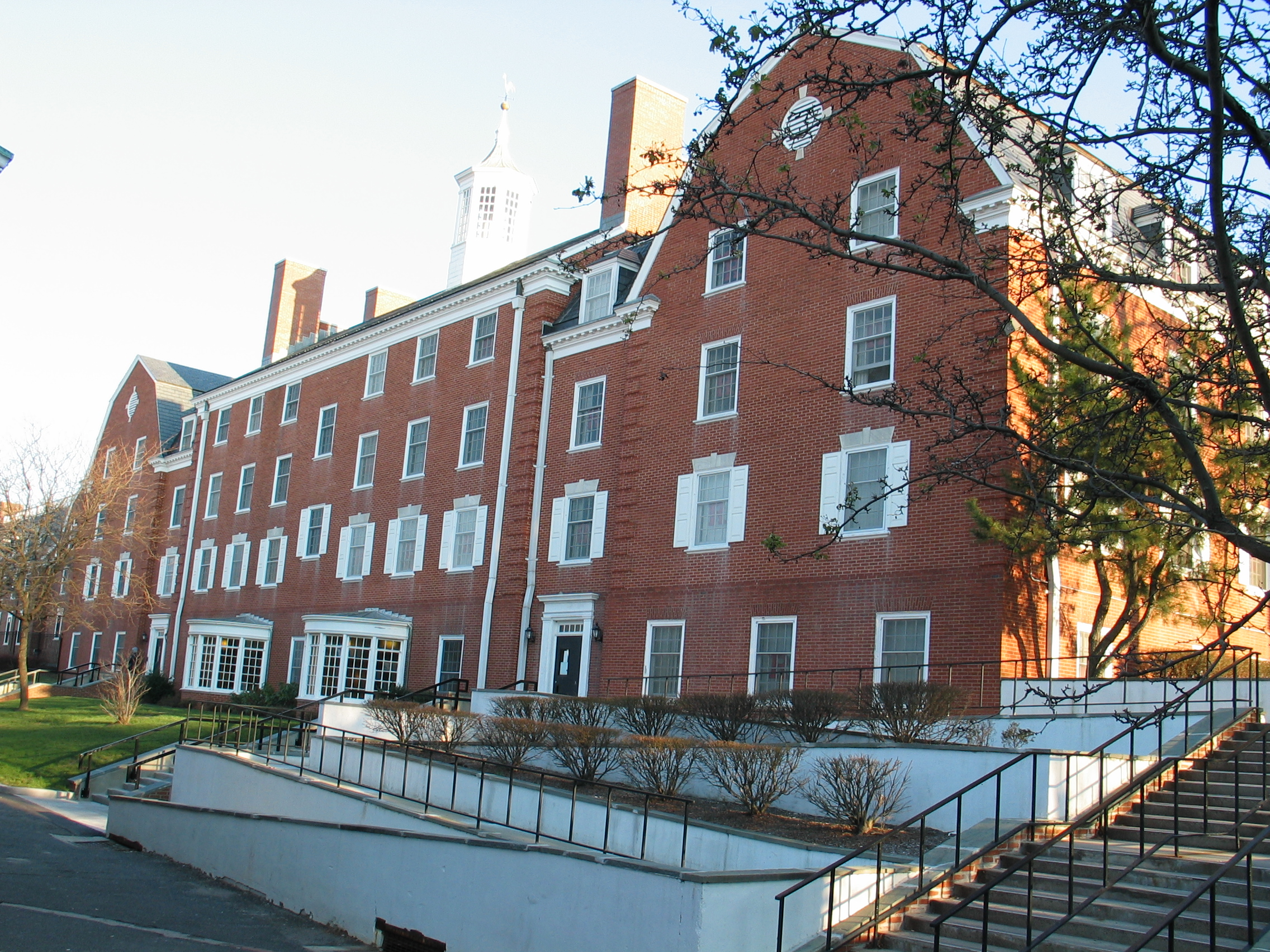
Demarest Hall rear

Demarest Hall was built during 1950 and 1951, and was named after Reverend William Henry Steele Demarest, President of Rutgers from 1905 to 1924. It has a cupola with a weather vane, hence the unofficial Demarest motto, "We've got a big gold cock." It is the only Rutgers residence hall completely dedicated to Special Interest Housing.

Demarest originally housed only freshmen, but older students protested. Demarest became the football players' dorm (until the mid-1960s) with sets of football player andirons in the two Main Lounge fireplaces indicating this status. One set of the football player andirons remain, though apparently the other set was stolen between 1993 and 2004. Rumors persist, and have been partly confirmed that the stolen set of football players is now at the Rutger's Club dining establishment.

In the mid-1960s, Demarest began housing Honors students. These students formed special interest sections as a way to learn from each other in informal discussion, as a relaxed, more in-depth alternative to the standard classroom lecture. Some sections were created in conjunction with academic departments, such as French, the first special-interest section, created in 1966. Some early Demarest sections included Arts and Crafts, Women's Studies, Puerto Rican Studies, and Natural History.

In the late 1970s, Demarest became an official special-interest hall, with funding from the Office of the Dean of Students; this funding was later assumed by the Bishop House Office of Residence Life, which was founded in 1980. Students ran the sections autonomously until the first time Rutgers College overbooked itself into a housing shortage and decided to implement the lottery system. Demarites had, up until then, been able to freely return to their sections year after year, but now it seemed that living in Demarest the next year would depend solely on the best lottery numbers, rather than their desire to remain active in the Demarest community. The residents of Demarest made a deal. They would accept limited supervision from the Office of Residence Life and implement certain requirements for living in the dorm, such as required individual projects, while still reserving the major decisions, such as the establishment of sections, for Demarest residents. In return, they would receive guaranteed housing in Demarest and the right to control section membership.

The autonomy did not last. In 1987, Residence Life imposed an unprecedented degree of supervision and administrative procedures on the special interest structure. Among the changes were the enumeration of membership criteria, the reformulation of most sections along strong academic lines (Arts and Crafts, for example, became Visual Arts), and the appointment of a faculty advisor for each section. The sections were segregated, their members forced to live together in contiguous blocks of rooms. Sections were required to answer directly to Bishop House. Residence Life never directly informed Demarites of the new rules; they had to find out about them by reading an ad in The Daily Targum. Berni Calkins, the then-Assistant Coordinator of Residence Life, who was primarily responsible for this low point in Demarest/Bishop House diplomacy, refused to cooperate with Demarest residents or even believe that some residents had rights under the Constitution, despite repeated invitations for her to attend a Hall Government meeting to discuss the issues.

In 1989, a new Demarest populace and a mostly-new Residence Life staff, including the inimitable Anna-Marie Toto, began a less bitter relationship, including SIC, the Section Issues Committee. SIC was formed to give Demarest residents a better opportunity to tell Residence Life their concerns about section-related issues. SIC was composed of the Residence Counselor, all the section leaders, and two additional representatives from each section who had lived in Demarest for at least a year. SIC was responsible for reviewing section program proposals, drawing up section budgets, reviewing section applications (for entire sections, new and continuing), and determining the criteria and procedures for section member applications. The sections were desegregated, wounds healed, and people actually started working together.

The cooperative spirit seemed to have evaporated with Anna-Marie Toto's departure from Bishop House: Residence Life retained control over the sections, but did not fulfill its part of the original bargain. However, Dean Calkins left to be a full-time mother, and Demarest has since undergone a renaissance—including the appointment of an official Demarest Historian position in Hall Government. New policies were enacted in the Fall 2009 Semester to create an environment where only Demarites who are actively contributing and participating in the various sections and events will be allowed to return. This new policy while already currently in effect, will be changed slightly so that Room-Selection will occur prior to the distribution of Lottery Numbers. This change reflects a new direction for Demarest where some members who would return to the dorm only did so due to a poor lottery number. The new policy actively seeks to remove these denizens who use Demarest as back-up housing in case they get a high lottery number.

In 2011, Demarest became be one of three residence halls at Rutgers-New Brunswick to test a new program of co-ed living environments. Students of either gender who wish to share a room with a roommate of the opposite gender could do so under this gender-neutral housing program, provided both parties select this housing option together. The bathrooms on the second floor are gender-neutral, and require a swipe of a Rutgers ID card to enter. For many years, all of the building's bathrooms were unofficially co-ed.

In 2022, Demarest began to host an outdoor music festival called DemFest. This event would feature bands from New Brunswick or the surrounding area. Around this time began the Demarest “Brower Challenge” that would

in the 2023-2024 school year, the total number of sections was 12. This included Anime, Creative Writing, Improv, Earth, BSL (Black Social Liberation) History/ Poli-Sci, Feminism, Gender and Sexuality, Cinema, Vis Arts, Philosophy, and RMS (Religion, Mythology, Spirituality). In late 2024, all these sections except for Vis Arts, Philosophy, Cinema, Feminism, Gender and Sexuality, and BSL (now titled Racial Equity) were cut due to concerns of a busy weekly schedule for demarites.

=== Famous former residents ===
The worldwide community of those who have ever lived in Demarest Hall is known as "Demarest-in-Exile."

- Junot Díaz, Pulitzer Prize for Fiction winner
- Christopher McCulloch
- Little-T and One Track Mike
- Mario Batali
- John McWhorter, linguist and commentator on American culture and language

== See also ==
- List of tallest buildings in New Brunswick, New Jersey
