= Nir Galim =

Moshav in central Israel

Nir Galim: נִיר גַּלִּים (Hebrew)
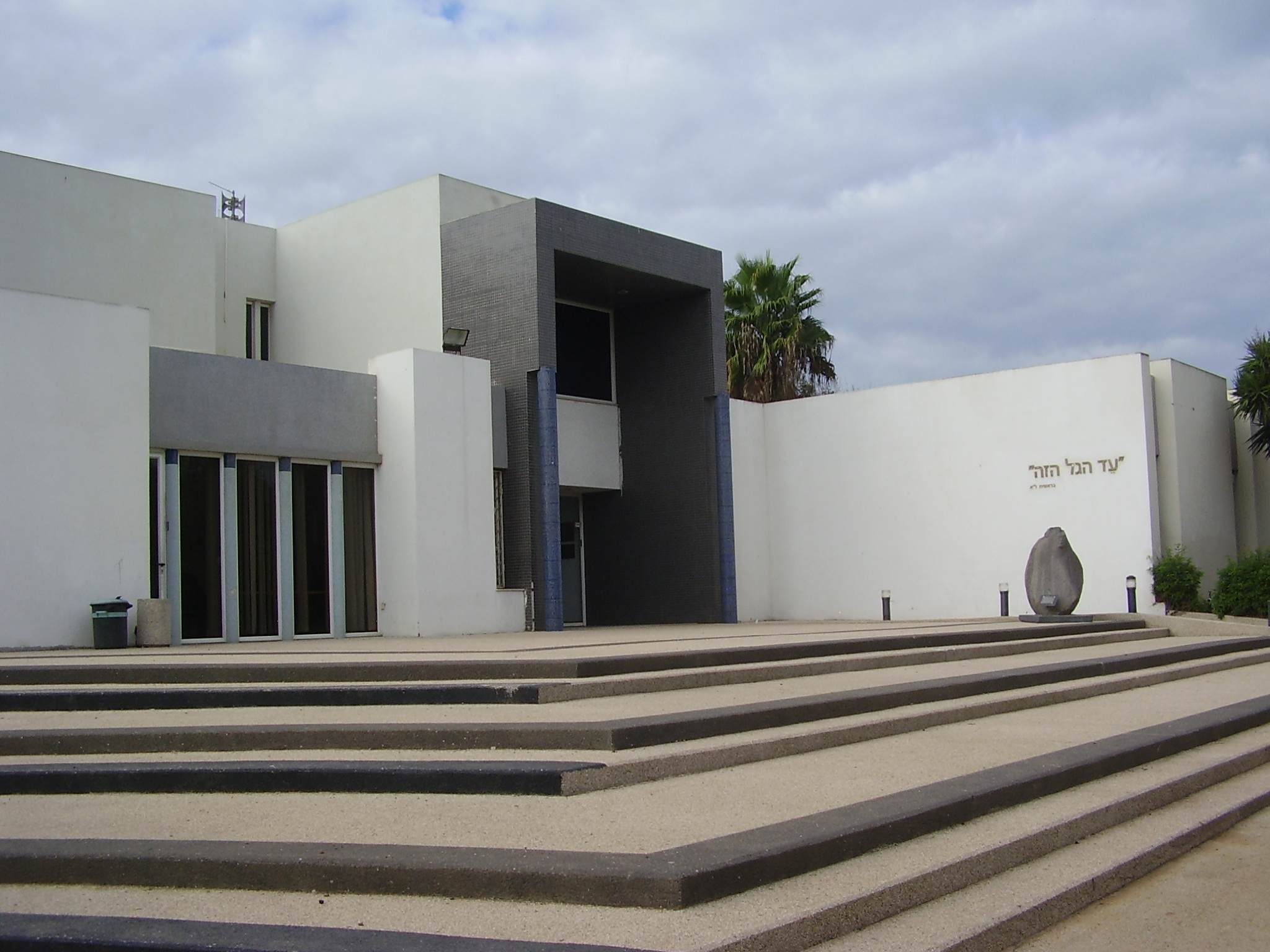

- Location within Central Israel Location within Israel
- Coordinates: 31°49′29″N 34°41′0″E
- Country: Israel
- District: Central
- Subdistrict: Rehovot
- Council: Hevel Yavne
- Affiliation: Hapoel HaMizrachi
- Founded: 1949
- Founder: Hungarian Jewish Holocaust survivors
- Population (2024): 1,251

Nir Galim (Hebrew: נִיר גַּלִּים, lit. 'Waves Meadow') is a religious moshav shitufi in south-central Israel, adjacent to the city of Ashdod. Located in the southern coastal plain, it falls under the jurisdiction of Hevel Yavne Regional Council. In 2024 it had a population of 1,251.

== History ==
The moshav was established in 1949, on land near the Palestinian village of Arab Suqrir, which was depopulated in the 1948 Arab–Israeli War.

It was initially called Nir VeGal (Hebrew: ניר וגל, lit. 'Meadow and Wave'). The founders were Holocaust survivors from Hungary and Central Europe, including a set of twins who survived Josef Mengele's experiments.

The Testimony House for the Heritage of the Holocaust was established on the moshav in 2009.

== Notable residents ==
- Ofir Ben Shitrit, Orthodox Jewish singer
- Yehuda Saado, Israeli singer

== See also ==
- Operation Dugo, an annual event originating in Nir Galim
