= Falafel =

Middle Eastern fried bean dish

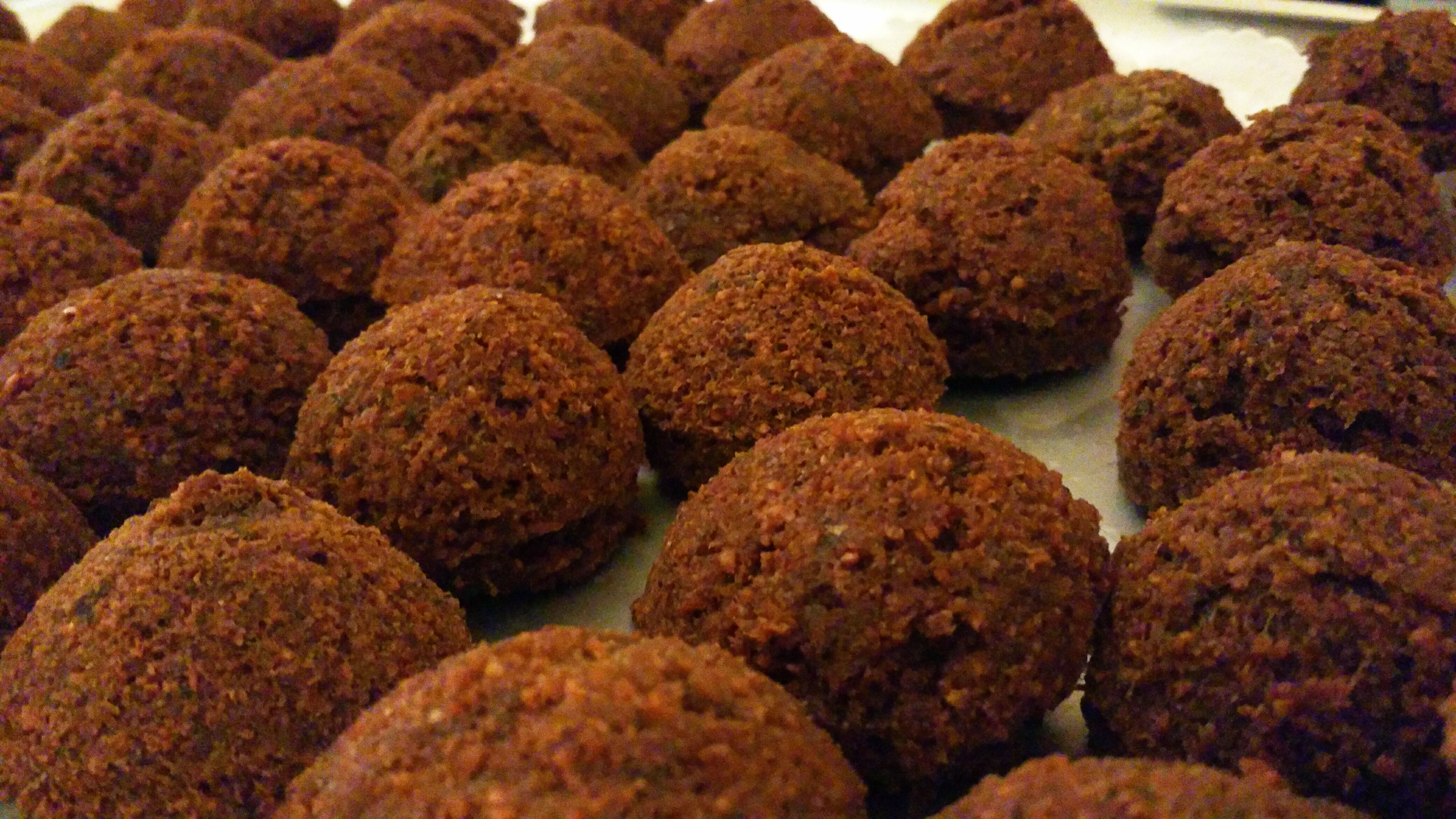
- Falafel balls
- Alternative names: Felafel
- Type: Fritter
- Course: Meze
- Place of origin: Egypt
- Region or state: Middle East
- Serving temperature: Hot or cold
- Main ingredients: Broad beans or chickpeas

Falafel (/fəˈlɑːfəl/ fə-LAH-fəl; Arabic: فلافل, IPA: [fæˈlæːfɪl]) is a deep-fried ball or patty-shaped fritter of Egyptian origin that features in Middle Eastern cuisine, particularly Levantine cuisines. It is made from ground fava beans, chickpeas, or both, and mixed with herbs and spices before frying.

Falafel is often served in a flatbread such as pita, samoon, laffa, or taboon; falafel also frequently refers to a wrapped sandwich that is prepared in this way. The falafel balls may be topped with salads, pickled vegetables, and hot sauce, and drizzled with tahini-based sauces. Falafel balls may also be eaten alone as a snack or served as part of a meze tray.

Falafel is a popular street food eaten throughout the Middle East. In Egypt and the Arabian Peninsula, it is most often made with fava beans, while in the Levant, it is typically made with chickpeas or sometimes a blend of both.

Falafel has been the subject of gastronationalistic campaigns in many Middle Eastern countries, most notably in the Israeli–Palestinian conflict, where both sides have claimed ownership of the dish.

== Etymology ==
The word falāfil (Arabic: فلافل) is Arabic and is the plural of filfil (فلفل) 'pepper', borrowed from Persian felfel (فلفل), cognate with the Sanskrit word pippalī (पिप्पली) 'long pepper'; or an earlier *filfal, from Aramaic pilpāl 'small round thing, peppercorn', derived from palpēl 'to be round, roll'.

The name falāfil is used world-wide. In English (where it has been written falafel, felafel, filafel and filafil), it is first attested in 1936.

Falafel is known as ṭaʿmiyya (Arabic: طعمية, IPA: [tˤɑʕˈmejjɑ]) in Egypt and Sudan. The word is derived from a diminutive form of the Arabic word ṭaʿām (طعام, 'food'); the particular form indicates a "unit" of the given root in this case Ṭ-ʕ-M (ط ع م, having to do with taste and food), thus meaning 'a little piece of food' or 'small tasty thing'.

The word falafel can refer to the fritters themselves or to sandwiches filled with them.

== History and distribution ==
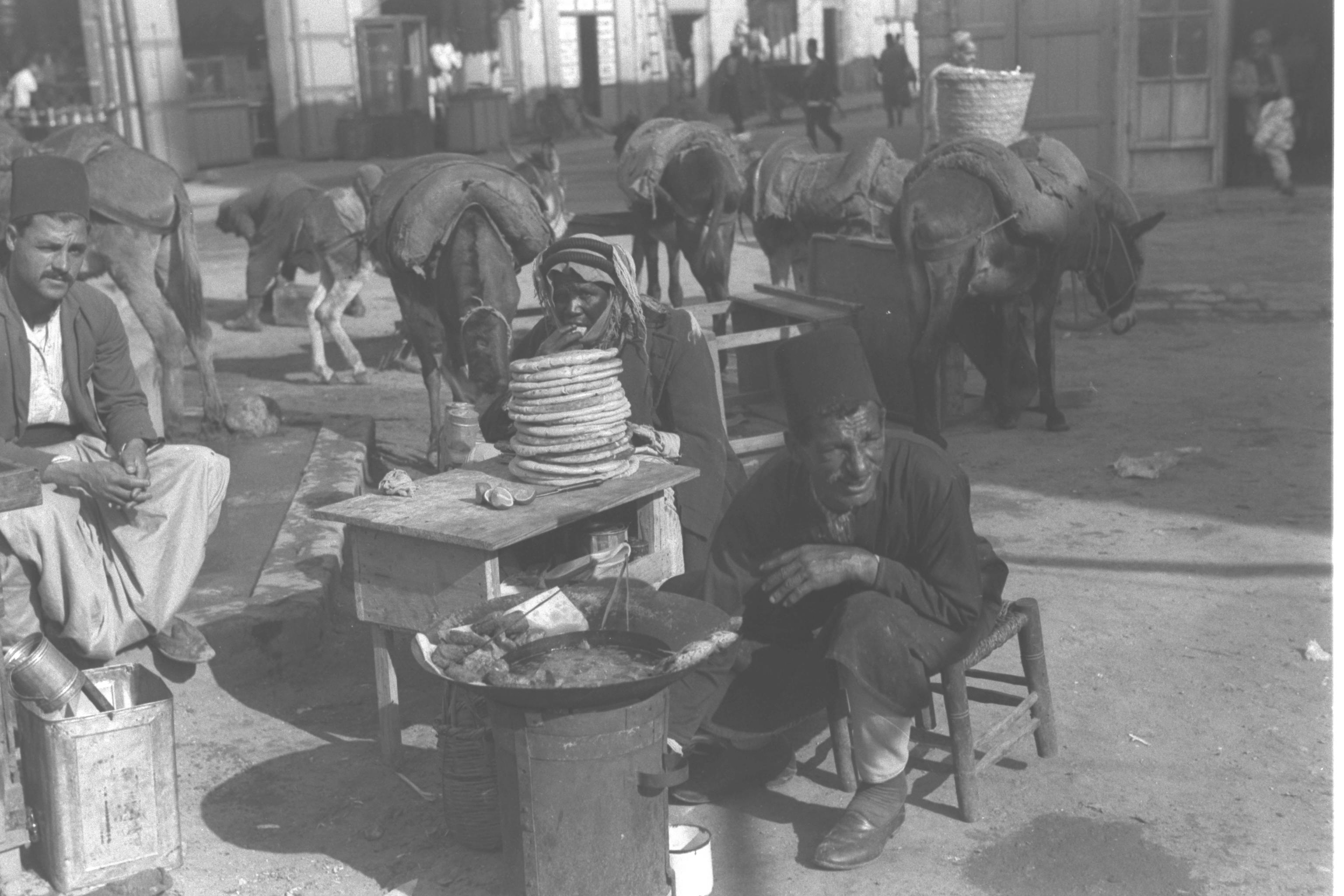
Falafel vendor in the Old City of Jerusalem, 1935.

The origin of falafel is uncertain. The dish most likely originated in Egypt. It has been speculated that its history may go back to Pharaonic Egypt. However, the earliest written references to falafel from Egyptian sources date to the 19th century, and oil was probably too expensive to use for deep frying in ancient Egypt. Another theory regarding the origins of falafel is that the dish was created when British soldiers from India, craving Indian cuisine, began making or having made replacements for Indian cuisine in Egypt. This theory is supported by circumstantial evidence though no conclusive evidence for it exists.

As Alexandria is a port city, it was possible to export the dish and its name to other areas in the Middle East. It first spread south into the rest of Egypt, but after World War 1 it began to spread outside of Egypt. By 1933 a falafel shop had been opened in Beirut and from there it spread down the Red Sea coast all the way to Yemen, it had spread west into Libya, and north into Turkey. Around this time the dish also spread to Mandatory Palestine where it was adopted by some Jews and Arabs, but many recent Ashkenazi Jewish migrants were hesitant. As it spread falafel generally remained unchanged though this was not always the case. In the town of Mersa Matruoh, fava beans were replaced with hyacinth beans and beef. In the Levant fava beans were replaced with chickpeas.

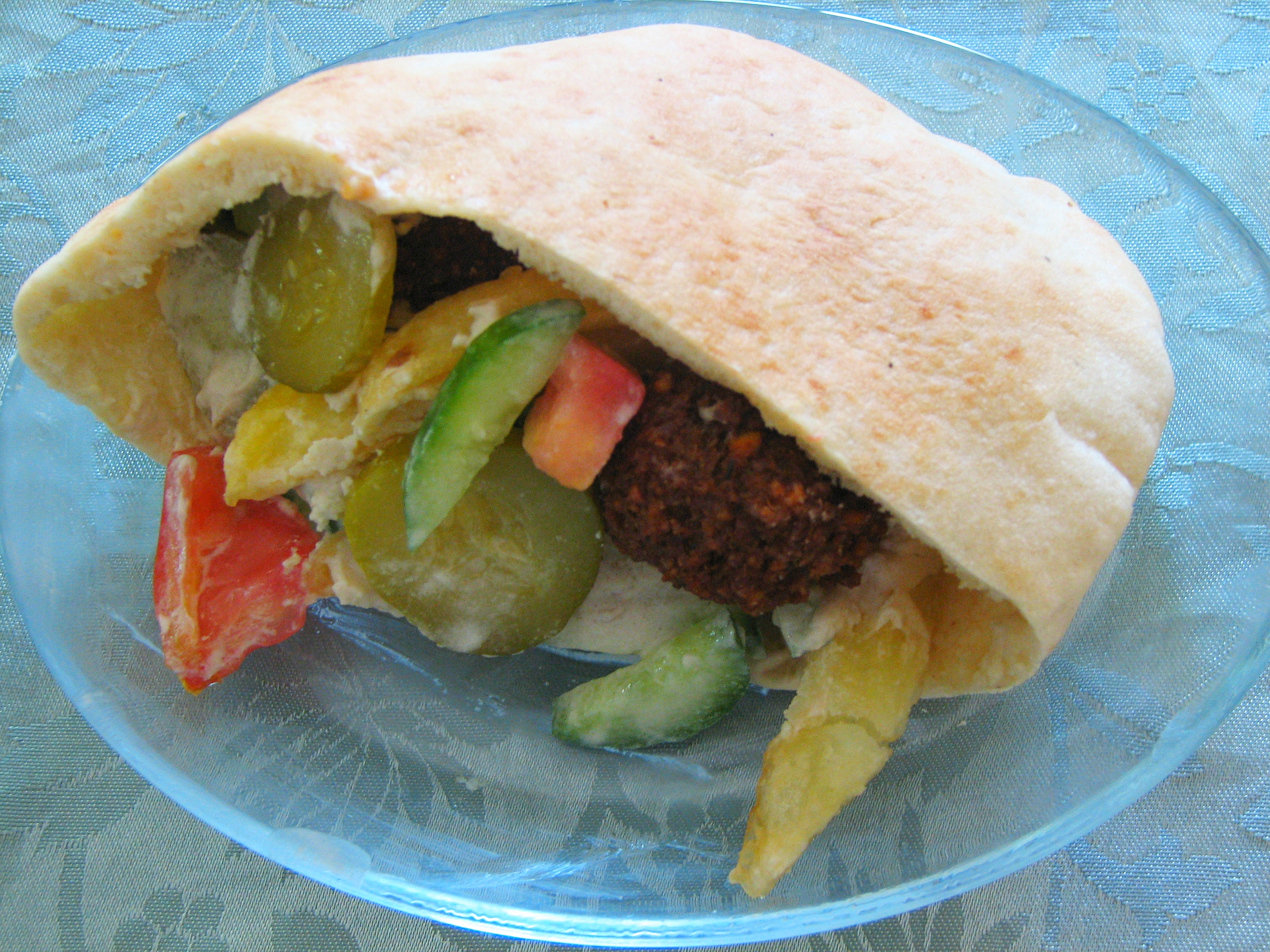
Falafel sandwich in pita

By the time of Israel's independence, falafel had yet to become as popular among Israelis as it is today. But the introduction of rationing in 1949 boosted falafel’s popularity. Not only was it a good source of protein, but its ingredients were also easily available to everybody. Though some continued to treat it as a foreign food, a growing number of cookbooks began to feature recipes. The arrival of Jews expelled from the Middle East, who had eaten falafel in their previous countries helped popularize the food to more hesitant demographics.

According to historian Gil Marks, the pita falafel sandwich was popularized after Israel's independence and in the 1950s by Jewish Yemeni refugees, though a 19 October 1939 The Palestine Post article is the first mention of the concept of falafels served in a pita bread as a street food.

In its spread falafel was aided by several factors: It was inexpensive, easy to store, easy to produce, convenient to eat, and could be served in a variety of ways.

=== Middle East ===
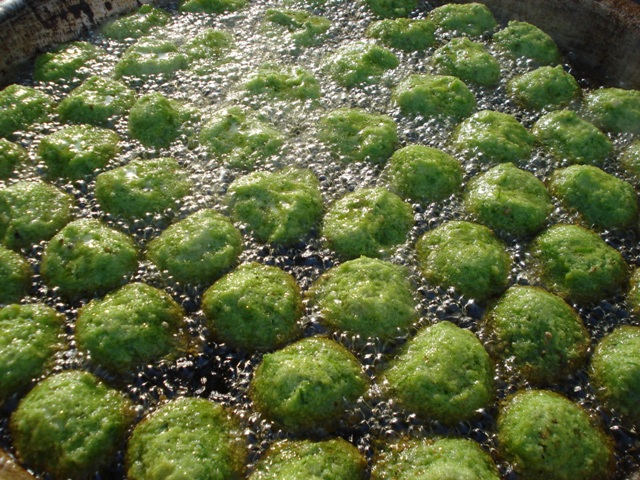
Egyptian falafel patties frying in oil

Falafel is a common form of street food or fast food in Egypt, across the Levant, and in the wider Middle East. The croquettes are regularly eaten as part of meze. During Ramadan, falafel balls are sometimes eaten as part of the iftar, the meal that breaks the daily fast after sunset. Falafel became so popular that McDonald's for a time served a "McFalafel" in its breakfast menu in Egypt.

Falafel is still popular in the Coptic diet, and as such large volumes are cooked during religious holidays. Falafel is consumed as part of the Lenten diet by Arab Christians.

Chickpea-based falafel, common in many Levantine cuisines including Israeli and Palestinian, has become widely recognized as a national dish in Israel, where it is a popular street food.

=== The West ===
Waves of migration of Arabs and Turks took falafel through Europe to Germany in particular, where a large Turkish population had put down roots. At first it was a dish consumed principally by migrants. During the early 1970s, the appearance of Turkish food stalls and restaurants made falafel available to the Germans, resulting in a transformation of the recipe.

In North America, prior to the 1970s, falafel was largely found in Middle Eastern, Mediterranean and Jewish neighborhoods and restaurants. By the 1990s, it had begun to spread to the broader populace, first as an exoticized "eastern" dish but later it became normalized the dish is a common and popular street food in many cities throughout North America.

=== Vegetarianism ===
Falafel is popular with vegetarians worldwide.

Falafel became popular among vegetarians and vegans as an alternative to meat-based street foods. While traditionally thought of as being used to make veggie burgers, its use has expanded as more have adopted it as a source of protein. Falafel is used as a meat substitute in some vegetarian recipes for meatloaf, sloppy joes and spaghetti and meatballs.

== Preparation and variations ==
Falafel is made from fava beans, chickpeas, or a combination of both. In Egypt, it is typically prepared with fava beans. In Israeli and Palestinian cuisine, chickpeas are commonly used, while in Jordan, Lebanon, Syria, and the wider Middle East, either chickpeas or a mix of both are used. The chickpea-based version is the most popular in the West. Some falafel include a filling inside the falafel dough; Palestinians make a variation of falafel stuffed with sumac and onions.

When chickpeas are used, they are not cooked prior to use (cooking the chickpeas will cause the falafel to fall apart, requiring adding some flour to use as a binder). Instead they are soaked (sometimes with baking soda) overnight, then ground together with various ingredients such as parsley, scallions, and garlic. Spices such as cumin and coriander are often added to the beans for added flavor. The dried fava beans are soaked in water and then stone ground with leek, parsley, green coriander, cumin and dry coriander. The mixture is shaped into balls or patties. This can be done by hand or with a tool called an aleb falafel (falafel mould). The mixture is usually deep-fried, or it can be oven-baked.

Falafel is typically ball-shaped, but is sometimes made in other shapes. The inside of falafel may be green (from green herbs such as parsley or green onion), or tan. Sometimes sesame seeds are added on top of the falafel before frying it.

When served as a sandwich, falafel is often wrapped with flatbread or stuffed in a hollow pita bread, or it can be served with flat or unleavened bread. Tomatoes, lettuce, cucumbers, and other garnishes can be added. Falafel is commonly accompanied by tahini sauce.

== Nutrition ==
Homemade falafel
Nutritional value per 100 g (3.5 oz)
- Energy: 1,393 kJ (333 kcal)
- Carbohydrates: 31.84 g
- Fat: 17.80 g
- Protein: 13.31 g
Vitamins and minerals
Vitamins	Quantity %DV^{†}
Vitamin A	13 IU
Thiamine (B1)	12% 0.146 mg
Riboflavin (B2)	13% 0.166 mg
Niacin (B3)	7% 1.044 mg
Pantothenic acid (B5)	6% 0.292 mg
Vitamin B6	7% 0.125 mg
Folate (B9)	20% 78 μg
Vitamin B12	0% 0.00 μg
Minerals	Quantity %DV^{†}
Calcium	4% 54 mg
Iron	19% 3.42 mg
Magnesium	20% 82 mg
Manganese	30% 0.691 mg
Phosphorus	15% 192 mg
Potassium	20% 585 mg
Sodium	13% 294 mg
Zinc	14% 1.50 mg
- Other constituents: Quantity
- Water: 34.62 g
- Link to USDA Database entry
- ^{†}Percentages estimated using US recommendations for adults, except for potassium, which is estimated based on expert recommendation from the National Academies.

Homemade falafel is typically around 35% water, 32% carbohydrates, 13% protein, and 18% fat (table). In a reference amount of 100 grams (3.5 oz), homemade falafel supplies 333 calories and is a rich source (20% or more of the Daily Value, DV) of folate (20% DV), several dietary minerals, and dietary fiber (table). Falafel can be baked to avoid the high fat content associated with frying in oil.

== Politics ==
Falafel has taken on a politicized role in various middle eastern countries with arguments over its geographic origin, and accusations of cultural appropriation.

Arguments over the relative importance of the dish in various cuisines is an example of gastronationalism. In particular, discussion centers around the adoption of the dish into Israeli cuisine as an example of cultural appropriation. The chickpea version has been adopted into Israeli cuisine, where it features prominently and has been called a national dish of Israel, a designation Palestinians and other Arabs have criticized.

== See also ==
- List of deep-fried foods
- Operation Dugo – Annual event in Israel
