= Lina Makoul =

Palestinian singer-songwriter

Lina Makoul لينا مخول
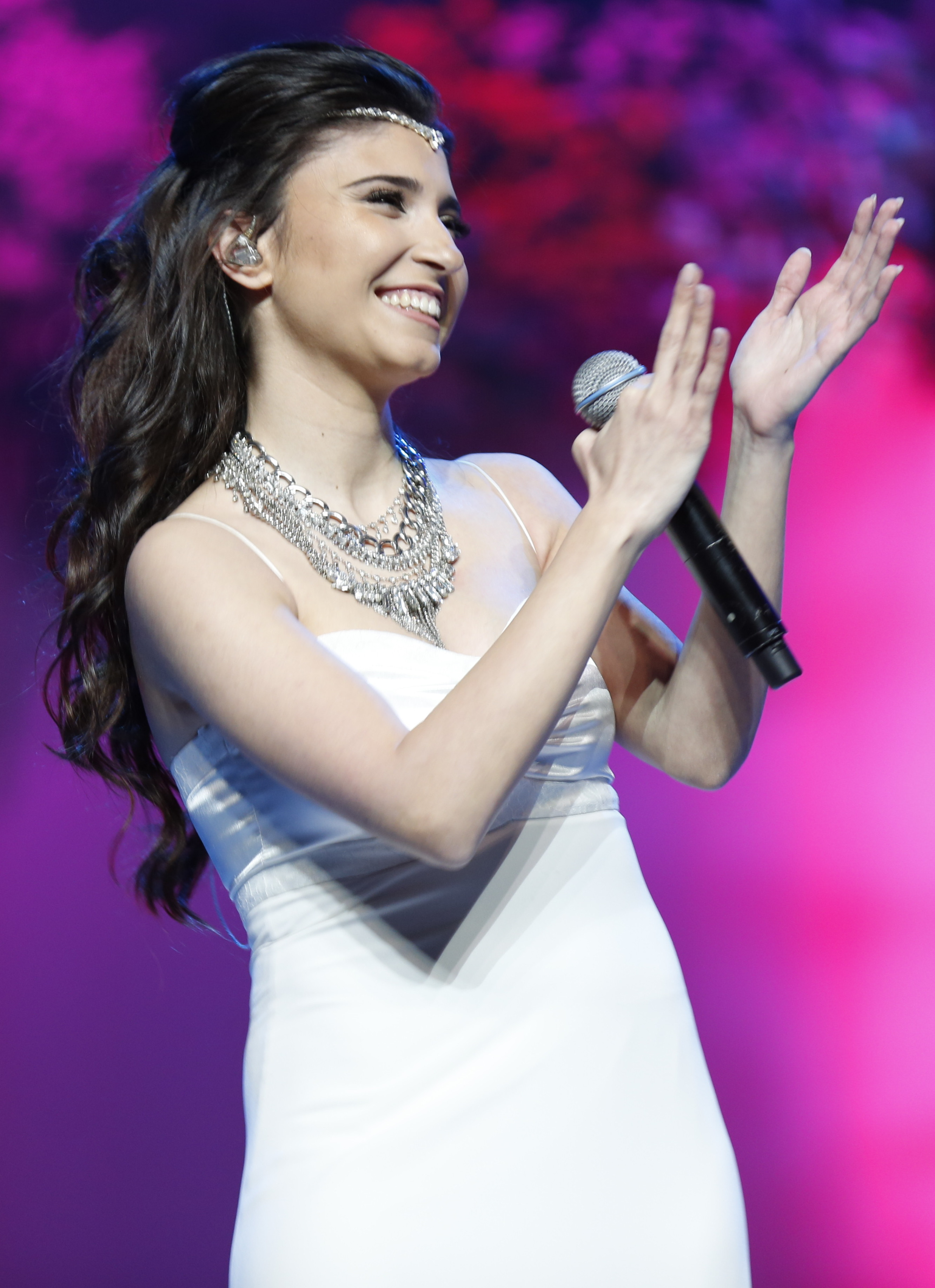
- Makoul performing in Haifa in 2015

Background information
- Born: Leena Courtney Makhoul; July 11, 1993 (age 33); Toledo, Ohio, U.S.
- Origin: Acre
- Genres: Pop, dance
- Years active: 2013–present
- Website: linamakoul.com

Leena Courtney Makhoul (Arabic: لينا مخول; born July 11, 1993), usually known as Lina Makoul, is a Palestinian-Israeli-American singer-songwriter and music producer. In 2013, she became the first Palestinian to win The Voice Israel.

== Early life ==
Makoul was born in Ohio, United States, to Arab-Christian parents and raised in Acre, Israel. Since the age of four she has loved dancing, playing the piano and singing. She is fluent in five languages.

She started studying biology at the Technion – Israel Institute of Technology in Haifa. She dropped out in order to pursue her singing career.

== Career ==
In 2012, Makoul auditioned for the second season of The Voice Israel. On 23 March 2013, Makoul won the final at the Nokia Arena in Tel Aviv with 62% of the vote, having performed "What a Feeling", theme song of the movie Flashdance. Along with her mentor Shabat, she performed a song written and composed by him with his daughter singer Manor Shabat. She also sang Hallelujah by Leonard Cohen. She was the first Palestinian-Israeli to win the show. Throughout the show she was also voted "best singer" by viewers. She was approached by Israeli-born international manager Irit TenHengel, who signed her to her label, Yodan Productions.

In September 2016, Makoul was selected as the opening act for the band Queen + Adam Lambert in Tel Aviv.

In September 2017, she announced she would be supporting British girl group Little Mix on the UK and Ireland leg of The Glory Days Tour for all 37 arena dates from October until November 2017.

She performed an Arabic version of Silent Night for the documentary film Silent Night: A Song for the World (2020).

Makoul joined the Saint Levant Deira tour in the fall of 2024, opening for the majority of the concerts on the tour in North America and Europe.

== National identity ==
In 2018 she described herself as American-Palestinian. That same year, a Yedioth Ahronoth article claimed that Makoul had cited her Palestinian identity as reason for refusing to sing at Independence Day celebrations. Makoul protested and mentioned that she had volunteered in the past, working at Israeli institutions such as synagogues and the Magen David Adom ambulance service. After becoming an independent artist in 2020, Makoul has become more critical of Israel, and in May of the following year, during a renewed outburst of Israel–Palestine hostilities, she was rebuked by her personal manager for voicing support for Palestinians during the inter-ethnical clashes between Jews and Arabs taking place in Israel. In 2025, her Instagram bio presented her as "100% independent, 100% Palestinian". In April 2025, during the Gaza war, she advertised for a coming concert in "Haifa, PAL", using the common abbreviation used for Palestine while referring to the Israeli city of Haifa. As a response, the city's mayor, Yona Yahav, a former Labor member of the Knesset, accused her of harming coexistence and banned her from performing in municipal events, just a week after also cancelling a performance by a far-right musician.

== Discography ==
Makoul's first single "This Ain't About You" was released worldwide on the April 29, 2016. The track achieved a top 10 in the UK Music-Week's Club and Pop Charts. Her second single "Dance Sucker" rose even further to No. 4 in the UK Music Week's Official Club Chart, reflecting her growing international success. The single "Dance Sucker" was released as a preview of Makoul's 2017 album Walking on a Tightrope. The track was produced by Jerry Wonda and Tal Forer.

=== Singles ===
Year	Single	Music Week (UK)	
Year	Single	DJ Charts	Commercial Pop Charts
2016	"This Ain't About You"	1	7
2017	"Dance Sucker"	—	—
2017	"Can't Keep Falling"	4	—

Awards and achievements
Preceded by Kathleen Reiter	The Voice ישראל; Winner; 2012-13	Succeeded by Elkana Marziano
