= Banai =

Banai (Hebrew: בנאי) is an Israeli and Persian surname. It may refer to the following people:

- The Banai family of actors and musicians:
  - Ehud Banai (born 1953), Israeli singer and songwriter
  - Elisha Banai (born 1988), Israeli singer, musician, songwriter, composer, music producer, and actor
  - Eviatar Banai (born 1973), Israeli musician, singer and songwriter
  - Gavri Banai
  - Meir Banai (1960–2017), Israeli musician, singer, and songwriter
  - Orna Banai (born 1966), Israeli actress, comedian, entertainer and past member of the Tel Aviv-Yafo city Council
  - Yossi Banai (1932–2006), Israeli performer, singer, actor, and dramatist
  - Yuval Banai (born 1962), Israeli musician
- Ya’akov Banai (1920–2009), Israeli military leader
- Hossein Banai, a director of Iran Scouting
