= Mashina (album) =

1985 debut album by Mashina

Studio album by Mashina
- Released: 1 November 1985
- Genres: Ska; new wave
- Language: Hebrew
- Label: CBS Israel
- Producer: Reuven Shapira

Mashina chronology
Mashina (1985)	Mashina 2 (1987)

Singles from Mashina
- 1. "Optikai Meduplam" Released: June 1985; 2. "Ki Lo Ba La" Released: 1985; 3. "Rakevet Laila" Released: 1985; 4. "Atid Matok / Balada LeSochen Kaful" Released: 1986

Mashina (Hebrew: משינה) is the debut studio album by Israeli pop rock band Mashina. It was released in November 1985 by CBS Israel and was produced by Reuven Shapira.

== Background ==
The foundations of several songs on the album were created by Yuval Banai and Shlomi Bracha during their military service. The pair wrote and recorded early versions of songs that later appeared on the album, including "Rakevet Laila", "Karim Abdul Zemer", "Atid Matok" and "Optikai Meduplam". After leaving the army in 1983, Banai and Bracha performed the material in several different line-ups. The group that eventually recorded the album consisted of Banai, Bracha, bassist Michael Benson and drummer Iggy Dayan.

The first recordings made by the band were demos of "Optikai Meduplam" and "Rakevet Laila". After record companies initially declined to sign Mashina, the band made a professional recording of "Optikai Meduplam" at DB Studios. Reuven Shapira worked as recording engineer and co-producer on the session. Around the same period, the band recorded "Rakevet Laila", "Ki Lo Ba La" and "Balada LeSochen Kaful".

In June 1985, "Optikai Meduplam" was sent to radio as the band's first promotional single. Its success helped persuade NMC to sign the band. After two further radio singles, "Ki Lo Ba La" and "Rakevet Laila", the full album was released in November 1985.

The album became Mashina's major breakthrough and included several songs that became well known in the band's repertoire, among them "Optikai Meduplam", "Atid Matok", "Anna", "Balada LeSochen Kaful" and "Rakevet Laila". The lyrics to "Rakevet Laila" were written by Ehud Banai, a cousin of Yuval Banai. Most of the album's songs were written and composed by Bracha, although other band members also received writing credits on several tracks.

The cover photograph was taken by Berry Friedlander, a friend of Yuval Banai who had exhibited photographs of a circus; the photograph of four monkeys used on the album cover was part of that work. The cover was designed by Ami Rubinger.

Musically, the album combined ska and new wave, and its production also made use of keyboards and drum machines. Bracha played keyboards on two tracks, Dayan also played keyboards, and Yaron Becher contributed keyboards.

The album was commercially successful and reached platinum status within about six months, after sales of more than 40,000 copies. Its sales later reached approximately 65,000 copies.

On 15 February 2008, the album was ranked ninth on a list of the 50 greatest Israeli debut albums of all time published by 7 Nights, the weekend supplement of Yedioth Ahronoth.

== Songs ==
=== "Optikai Meduplam" ===
Bracha wrote "Optikai Meduplam" during his military service. Mashina originally performed the song in English at the Penguin club. Bracha later wrote Hebrew lyrics for his band HaHazit HaAmamit; it was the first song he wrote in Hebrew. In the HaHazit HaAmamit version, the song was called "Kshayim BeHakla'ut" ("Difficulties in Agriculture"). When Mashina recorded it, the title was changed to "Optikai Meduplam". The title was inspired by a sign Bracha saw advertising a qualified optician.

One line referred to the winter of a drought year, while another reflected Bracha's frustration about his own lack of progress compared with a close friend who had travelled abroad. The song was released as Mashina's first single in June 1985.

=== "Atid Matok" ===
Bracha and Banai wrote "Atid Matok" during their military service.

=== "Anna" ===
The song was written by Orly Silbersatz, who was Yuval Banai's partner at the time and later became his wife. Over the years there were rumours about the person who inspired the song, including claims that it referred to actress Anat Atzmon, a friend of Silbersatz. Silbersatz said that she had written the song about herself.

=== "Balada LeSochen Kaful" ===
Bracha created "Balada LeSochen Kaful" during a period in which Mashina had ceased activity and he was performing with bassist Michael Benson in the group HaHazit HaAmamit. The song was originally written in English. Bracha wrote it at Benson's request, drawing on Benson's father, whose occupation was secretive. The nonsensical style of the lyrics was influenced by the writing of Danny Sanderson.

The other members of Mashina also contributed to the lyrics, and the album credits the words to "Shlomi Bracha and Mashina".

=== "Karim Abdul Zemer" ===
"Karim Abdul Zemer" was the first song written by Banai and Bracha together, during their military service.

=== "Rakevet Laila" ===
Bracha wrote and composed "Rakevet Laila" during his military service, initially with different lyrics. As he was dissatisfied with the text, Yuval Banai passed the song to his cousin Ehud Banai, who rewrote the lyrics. Only the opening couplet from Bracha's original version was retained in the final recording.

The band initially recorded a spoken English count before the repeated chorus. At Yuval Banai's suggestion, it was replaced with two lines in Persian that he had learned from his cousin Shmulik Banai, asking Gila where she was and what she did. The song was released as the album's third single in November 1985, shortly before the album itself, and became one of Mashina's best-known hits.

=== "Aval Ein" ===
Bracha wrote "Aval Ein" while he was a member of HaHazit HaAmamit.

=== "Anigodin" ===
Mashina originally performed "Anigodin" at the Penguin club under the title "Ein Li Koach LeMilim". The name "Anigodin" originated from a typographical error in drummer Iggy Dayan's name in an advertisement for Basis 10, a band in which Dayan and Michael Benson had played.

=== "Ki Lo Ba La" ===
"Ki Lo Ba La" was released as Mashina's second single in July 1985.

=== "HaTotach Metzaltzel Pa'amayim" ===
Bracha wrote "HaTotach Metzaltzel Pa'amayim" about a friend of Yuval Banai whose eardrum was damaged after a 155 mm artillery shell passed nearby.

== Track listing ==
All songs were written and composed by Shlomi Bracha except where otherwise noted.

Side one
No.	Title	Lyrics	Music	Length
1.	"Optikai Meduplam" (אופטיקאי מדופלם)	Shlomi Bracha	Shlomi Bracha	3:30
2.	"Atid Matok" (עתיד מתוק)	Yuval Banai, Shlomi Bracha	Shlomi Bracha	3:45
3.	"Anna" (אנה)	Orly Silbersatz	Iggy Dayan, Yuval Banai	2:36
4.	"Balada LeSochen Kaful" (בלדה לסוכן כפול)	Michael Benson, Yuval Banai, Shlomi Bracha, Iggy Dayan	Shlomi Bracha	3:19
5.	"Karim Abdul Zemer" (כרים עבדול זמר)	Yuval Banai, Shlomi Bracha	Shlomi Bracha	4:45

Side two
No.	Title	Lyrics	Music	Length
1.	"Rakevet Laila" (רכבת לילה)	Ehud Banai	Shlomi Bracha	3:36
2.	"Aval Ein" (אבל אין)	Shlomi Bracha	Shlomi Bracha	2:47
3.	"Anigodin" (אניגודין)	Yuval Banai, Shlomi Bracha	Shlomi Bracha	2:02
4.	"Ki Lo Ba La" (כי לא בא לה)	Shlomi Bracha	Shlomi Bracha	3:48
5.	"HaTotach Metzaltzel Pa'amayim" (התותח מצלצל פעמיים)	Shlomi Bracha	Shlomi Bracha	5:48

== Personnel ==
=== Mashina ===
- Yuval Banai – vocals, arrangements
- Shlomi Bracha – guitar, keyboards (side one, track 1; side two, track 4), arrangements
- Michael Benson – bass guitar, backing vocals, arrangements
- Iggy Dayan – drums, percussion, backing vocals, keyboards (side two, track 1), arrangements

=== Additional personnel ===
- Yaron Becher – keyboards, arrangement (side two, track 5)
- Reuven Shapira – accordion, arrangements
