= Banai (disambiguation) =

Banai is a surname.

It may also refer to:

- Banai, Bangladesh
- Banai (goddess), Hindu goddess
- Banai (sub-tribe), a sub-tribe of Trable, India
