= Allan Moon =

Canadian musician

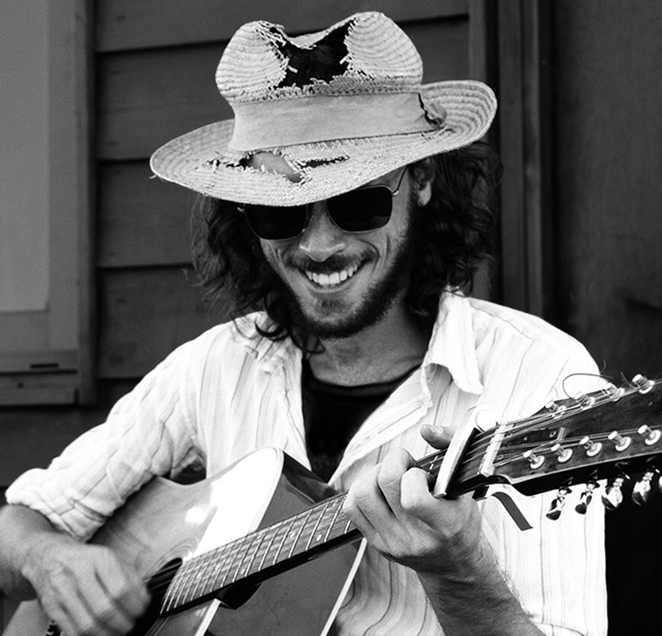

Background information
- Born: January 6, 1976 (age 50); Toronto, Ontario, Canada
- Genres: Folk, Blues, Rock, Pop, Dance, Lo-fi, Psychedelic Rock
- Occupations: Musician, Singer-songwriter, Record producer, Graphic designer, Poet
- Instruments: Vocals, Guitars, Harmonica, Keyboards, Saxophone, Bass
- Labels: Songbird, Hi Fidelity
- Website: www.allanmoon.com

Allan Moon is a Canadian singer-songwriter, musician, artist, poet and producer. Moon was born in Toronto, Ontario, Canada and grew up in the New York City. In 1992, Moon emigrated to Tel Aviv, Israel.

== Music ==
Moon's first music release was a 5-song demo EP in 2006, which included the song "Song of the Wind" and a hidden tracked acoustic cover version of Billy Joel's "Uptown Girl". The demo paved the way to his debut full-length album, Song of the Wind.

Released in 2008, Song of the Wind showcased Moon's songwriting as a direct progression from his poetry, reflecting themes of country life and introspection. The album was characterized by acoustic guitars and Moon's soft, almost breaking voice, reminiscent of Neil Young. It received favorable reviews, with the magazine Americana UK comparing his writing to that of Nick Drake and John Martyn.

In 2014, Moon released his second studio album, Children of the Call, featuring prominent Israeli indie musicians such as Geva Alon, Uzi Ramirez, Kutiman, Uri Brauner Kinrot, Eyal Talmudi, Adam Scheflan, and Karolina. The album blended genres such as Folk, R&B, Funk, and Psychedelic Rock.

In 2015, Moon released Analog Memories, a compilation EP of demos and outtakes, including the original demo for "Light Up," later recorded by Boom Pam.

In 2019, Moon released the single "The Art of Rolling," produced by Adam Scheflan and Tamir Muskat of Balkan Beat Box.

In 2024, Moon released the EP Sea Part, his first studio release in 12 years. The EP presented reimagined interpretations of songs originally written by Moon for albums by Kutiman and Ouzo Bazooka. The reworkings were framed in an atmospheric and nostalgic '80s synth-driven aesthetic, blending layered synthesizers, dreamy textures, and Moon's emotive vocal delivery.

Later in 2024, Moon followed up with the EP Sea Part II. Original new tracks and previously unreleased songs co-written with longtime collaborator Uzi Ramirez were presented in a classic rock-inspired sound, offering a stylistic contrast to its predecessor.

== Discography ==
Allan Moon Discography
Year	Album	Format
2024	Sea Part II	EP
2024	Sea Part	EP
2019	The Art of Rolling	SP
2016	Analog Memories	LP
2014	Children of the Call	LP
2008	Song of the Wind	LP

== Musical style ==
Moon has demonstrated a refusal to conform to any single musical genre. Each album represents a distinct artistic chapter, exploring varied musical palettes such as Folk, Americana, Psychedelic Rock, Funk, Synthpop, and Classic rock. This diversity is prevalent not only in his solo work but also in his production and songwriting, reflecting his adaptability and wide-ranging creative vision.

== Songwriting ==
Moon's songwriting credits include contributions to several albums:

- 2017 – Gili Yalo by Gili Yalo
- 2016 – 6 AM by Kutiman
- 2015 – Cut Out Club by Cut Out Club
- 2014 – Ouzo Bazooka by Ouzo Bazooka
- 2012 – Second Hand Love by Electra
- 2010 – Alakazam by Boom Pam

== Record producer ==
Moon produces all of his own solo albums, often playing many of the instruments himself, showcasing his multi-instrumental talent and hands-on approach to music production.

In 2008, Moon produced Yuval Banai's fourth solo album, Me'ever Le'Harim (Beyond the Mountains), which saw Banai venture into folk and Americana-inspired arrangements with lap-steel guitars and stripped-down production. The album marked a significant departure from Banai's earlier rock-oriented style.

In 2015, Moon produced the debut LP for indie folk singer Nomke, titled It's OK I'm Alone. Known for its minimalist acoustic sound and introspective songwriting, the album showcased Moon's ability to adapt his production style to complement each artist's unique voice.

== Graphic design ==
Moon's mixed-media project, Phoetry, combined poetry and visual art and led to a series of album cover designs and concert posters for artists such as Mashina, Boom Pam, Berry Sakharof, Alon Eder, and The Apples.

== Poetry ==
Upon arriving in Tel Aviv, Moon broke into the English-language poetry scene, participating in underground readings and performances reminiscent of the Beat Generation poets. His poetic style was raw and druggy, with sexual innuendos, often compared to William S. Burroughs.

"...Moon's poems are authentic photographs of written experience as a kind of sustained ecstatic fictional, (auto)biographical experience. Moon sort of milks an orgasm in his best poems, and leaves the technique floundering for a philosophy. His work contains none of the moral/linguistic imperatives of Bernstein, nor the violent ejaculations of Burroughs, and in its own right becomes a poem distinctly his own." – by Elazar from a preface to ARC 15 – Journal of the Israel Association of Writers in English.

In 1997, Moon published his first book titled Word Felon, a collection of poems from 1992–1996 which he had been performing with. The poetic style of Felon featured language deconstruction, broken rhymes, and freestyles, inspired by his upbringing in the rap culture of 1980s New York City. Most of the poems dealt with a dark portrayal of underground big city culture, drugs, sex, and personal alienation, through the eyes of a lost boy.

After Word Felon, Moon focused on mixed-media art experiments; combining art, photography, graphic design, and poetry. These works would finally see light in 2002 under the project title: Phoetry, a term Moon coined as a fusion of *Photo* and *Poetry*.

Phoetry was published as a book which coincided with an art exhibition of the same name. The book contained poems and their visual interpretations in the form of photographs, graphic designs, and sketches. The exhibition ran in two galleries in Tel Aviv from 2002 through 2003, and it featured "blow-ups" of the visuals in the book. Phoetry found Moon more mature and reconciled, with poems colored by themes of love, relationships, and a newfound affection for nature.

Moon's poems and translations have been featured in several literary publications around the world.
