= Elisha Banai =

Israeli musical artist

- אלישע בנאי
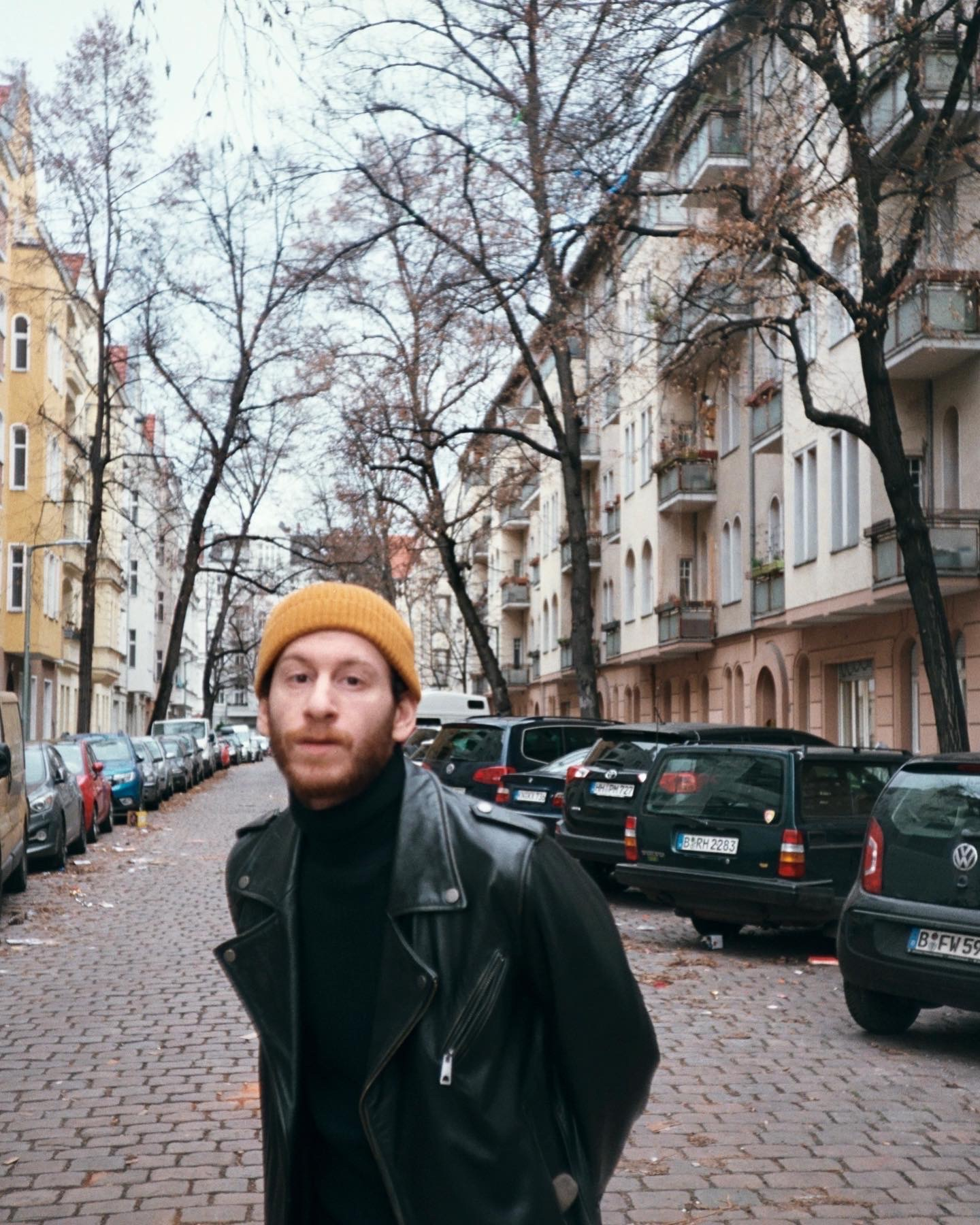
- Born: 18 November 1988 (age 37); Tel Aviv, Israel
- Occupations: Singer; actor
- Parents: Yuval Banai (father); Orly Silbersatz Banai (mother)
- Relatives: Banai family

Elisha Banai (Hebrew: אלישע בנאי; born 18 November 1988) is an Israeli singer, musician, songwriter, composer, music producer and actor.

== Biography ==
Banai was born, raised and educated in Tel Aviv to an artistic family. His father is the lead singer Yuval Banai of the band Mashina, and his mother is the actress Orly Silbersatz Banai. His grandfather is Israel Prize-winning actor and singer Yossi Banai. Banai is the oldest brother of Amalia Banai, Sophie Banai and Ahron Banai.

== Career ==
In 2006, he joined the punk rock and roll band "Got No Shame", of which he was a member for 4 years. The band released a studio album called "Hometown Underground" and even went on tour in the United States. In 2010, Banai went on tour with the band "Got No Shame" in California. When he returned to Israel with new material, he played them to Matti Gilad and they began playing, writing and arranging the songs, and then began performing and calling themselves "Elisha Banai and the Forty Thieves". In April 2010, Elisha Banai and the Forty Thieves released their first single, "Barcelona". Only two years later, their debut album was released, and with it singles such as "Like Everyone", "Everything Burned" and "San Diego". In 2014, they released their second album "Speed of Light", produced by Peter Roth. From this album, they released singles such as "Noga Moshet Tzedek" and "Einstein". In January 2019, they released the first single "Hungry Heart" from their third album "Where to Alley". In March 2019, the band, in collaboration with Gidi Gov, released the second single "Hero" from their third album "Where to Alley", which was released on May 12 of that year. In January 2020, Banai released an EP under the name "Marco Polo" featuring the single "Demon Train". In February 2022, Elisha released a mini-album called "Continuing to Chase the Dreams" under his own name, for the first time without the Forty Bandits, from which a double single was released, "Continuing to Chase the Dreams" + "Werewolf" with a music video directed by Banai's sister, director Amalia Zilbershatz Banai. The second single released is "Bicycle Path" with a music video featuring actors Tom Avni, Lir Katz and Dov Navon.

In 2021, he participated in and won the VIP season of the show "MKR The Winning Kitchen", in which he competed in cooking together with his mother Orly. In January 2022, he was selected as a presenter for the Castro fashion company for the year 2022-2023. In 2024, he participated in the third season of Dancing with the Stars, was eliminated on the sixth day and returned to the United team after winning the Lifeline episode among the eliminated couples. He was finally eliminated in the fourteenth elimination.

== Studio albums ==
2012 - "Elisha Banai and the forty thieves"

2014 - "Speed of light"

2019 - "ally to where?"

2020 - "marco polo"

2022 - "keep chasing after the dreams"

== Film ==
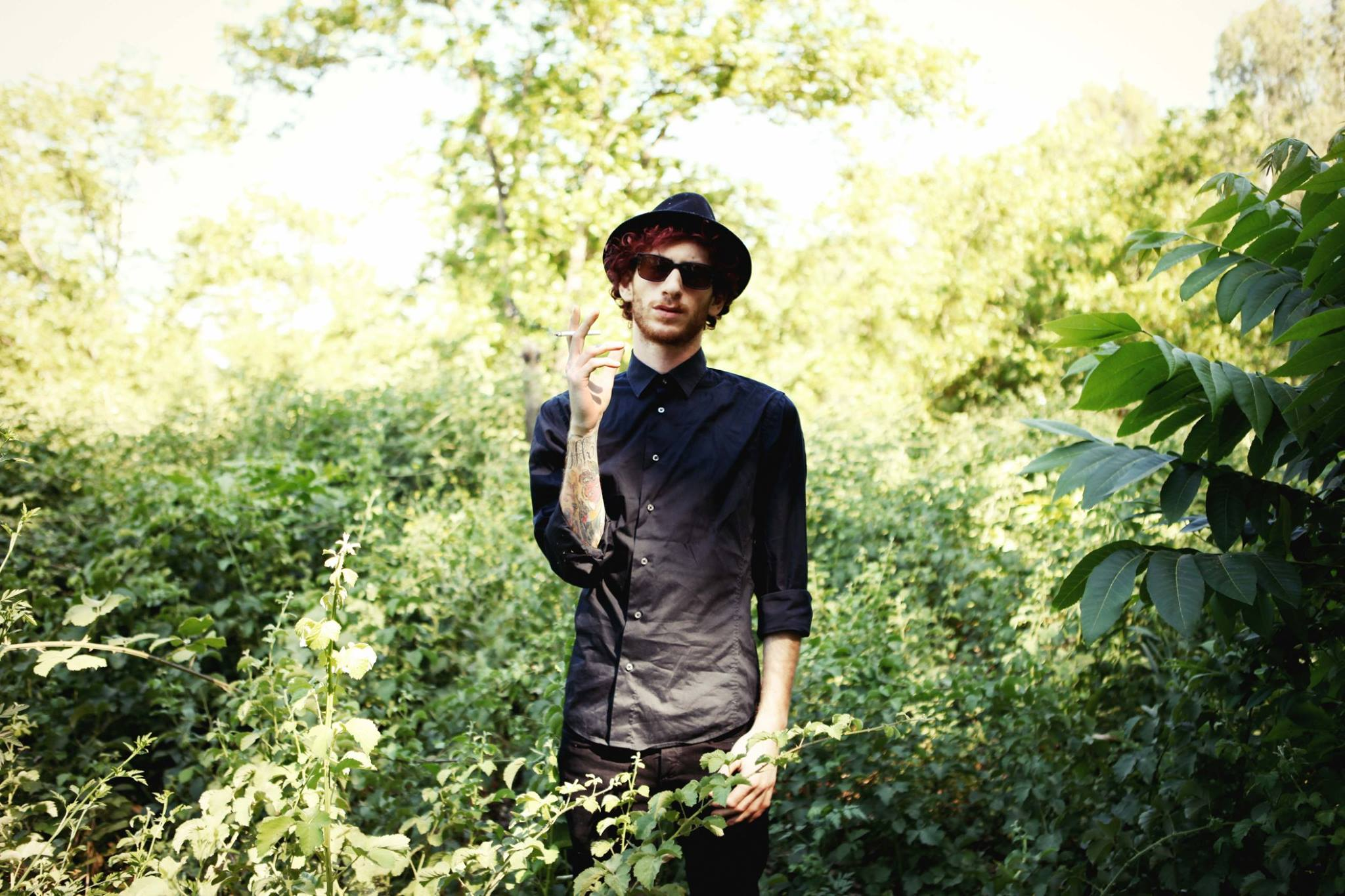
Elisha Banai

2015 - "Apples from the Desert" as Dubi (nominated for Best Supporting Actor Ophir award)

2018 - "The Electrifiers" (HaMechashmelim) as Yotam (OSN Movies and Green Productions)

2021 - "Image of Victory" as Elyakim Ben-Ari (Bleiberg Entertainment)

2021 - Honeymood as Michael, Elinor's ex

2025 - Bella as Yaki

== Television ==
2013 - "Makimi" as Brenner (HOT3).

2016 - "Mother's Day" as "Zovik" (Keshet)

2016 - "Bilti Hafich" 2 as Hezi (Reshet).

2016 - "Charlie Golf One" (Tagged) as Roi (Yes).

2017 - "Fullmoon" as Oren (HOT).

2017 - "Nevsu" as Gilad (Reshet/Netflix).

2018 - "Nechama" in guest role as "Davidi" (HOT)

2019 - "True Hero" (Gibor Amiti) as Bactus (Teddy Productions)

2023 - "Six Zeros (Kan11)

2024 - "8200" (hot)
