= Mami (rock opera) =

Israeli rock opera

Mami (Hebrew: מאמי, meaning ‘sweetie’) is an Israeli rock opera that was written by Hillel Mittelpunkt, Ehud Banai, and Yossi Mar Haim. Shefi Yishai and Yossi Elefant were responsible for musical production and arrangement.

The first version of the opera came on stage in 1986, when the leading role was played by Mazi Cohen, and the supporting roles by Ehud Banai and Aryeh Moskona. The opera appeared at the "Tzavta" Theatre, and was concerned with real political subjects, such as the occupation of the territories of the West Bank and Gaza (which was then nearing its twentieth year), the unequal discrimination of the residents of southern Israel, and Israeli militarism.

The musical was adapted to an Israeli musical movie of the same name in 2019 starring Neta Elkaiam as the title role and Dudu Tassa as the narrator. It also stars Riki Gal, Yuval Banay, Eran Tzur and Aryeh Moskona. The movie got raving reviews and is one of few Israeli musical movies that got major success. One of them is of course "Kasablan".
