= Yuval Banai =

Israeli musician (born 1962)

- יובל בנאי
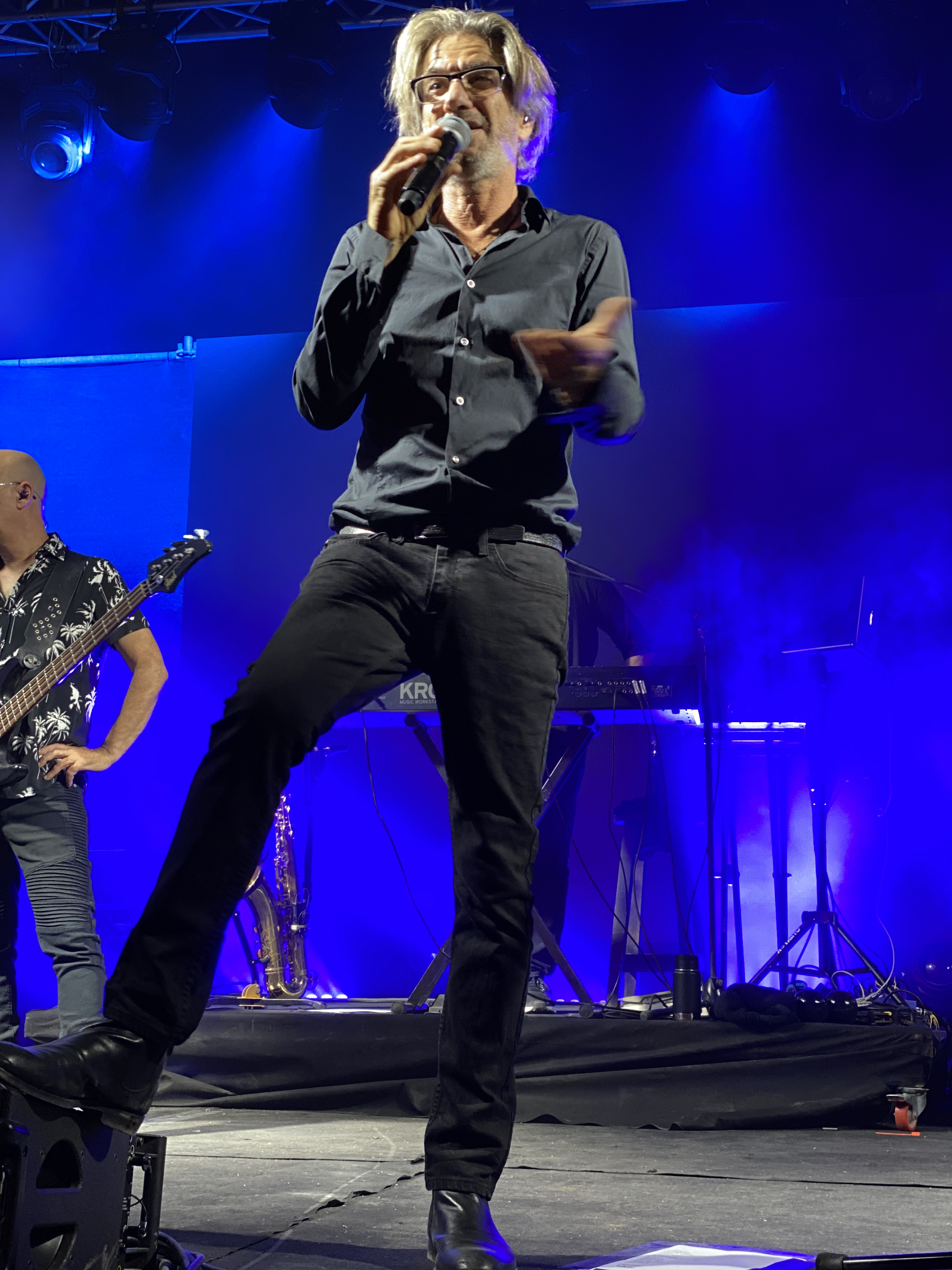
- Banai in 2021
- Born: 9 June 1962 (age 64); Tel Aviv, Israel
- Occupations: Singer; composer
- Years active: 1984–present
- Spouse(s): Orly Silbersatz (m. 1987; div. 2007) Amalia Rosenblum (m. 2017)
- Children: 4, including Elisha Banai
- Father: Yossi Banai
- Relatives: Banai family
- Musical career
- Genres: Pop rock; new wave; ska; alternative rock; hard rock
- Instruments: Vocals; guitar
- Labels: Hed Arzi; Helicon; 8th Note

Yuval Banai (Hebrew: יובל בנאי; born 9 June 1962) is an Israeli musician, best known as the lead singer of the influential Israeli pop rock band Mashina.

== Career ==
Banai served in the Artillery Corps of the Israel Defense Forces during the 1982 Lebanon War. While in the military, he met guitarist Shlomi Bracha, with whom he formed a band. The two went in different directions after their military service ended, with Banai forming the band Shlom Ha-Tzibur ("Public Safety"). In 1984, he and Braha decided to form a new band, which they called Mashina. They released their debut album in 1985. Over the next decade, Mashina released several successful albums.

In May 1995 the group disbanded after a series of four farewell shows. Banai went on to release several solo albums: "Yuval Banai" (1997), "Rashi Dub" (1999) (produced by bass player Yossi Fine), and "Nish'ar BaMakom" ("Staying Put") (2001). Mashina reformed in 2003, and in 2005 they released an album entitled "Futuristic Romance" ("romantica atidanit"). In 2008, Banai released another solo album, "Me'ever Le'harim" ("Over the Mountains"), produced by alt-folk singer Allan Moon.

Banai has also worked as an actor, appearing in Yaky Yosha's Summertime Blues and in the movie Nadia in the 1980s, as well as in the TV series Chunt Lee (2002). Recently Banai has returned to TV, this time as a Mentor on the Israeli edition of The Voice.

His most recent musical project is titled "Mobius Trip", an electronic music project which consists of new songs as well as electronic remixes of existing work.

Aside from his musical career, Yuval Banai served as coach and mentor (alongside his teammate, Shlomi Braha) on television show, The Voice Israel in the second season.

== Personal life ==
Yuval was born in Tel Aviv, Israel, to Ilana and Yossi Banai. He was one of the more prominent members of the Banai family, which includes many noted entertainers, among them Yuval Banai's uncles Gavri Banai, Ya'akov Banai and Chaim Banai (actors) and Yitzhak Banai (judge); his cousins Ehud Banai, Uri Banai, Meir Banai, and Eviatar Banai, all of whom have found success as musicians, and Orna Banai, an actress and comedian.

He married actress Orly Silbersatz in 1987, and they had three children together, including Elisha Banai, before divorcing in 2007. After their divorce, Banai met screenwriter and novelist Amalia Rosenblum, his partner since then. The couple have a child together, Aaron Banai, born February 2013.

== Discography ==
Year	Album	Label
1997	Yuval Banai (יובל בנאי)	Hed Arzi
1999	Rashi Dub (רש"י דאב)	Hed Arzi
2001	Nish'ar Ba'makom ("Staying Put", נשאר במקום)	Helicon
2008	Me'ever Le'harim ("Beyond the Mountains", מעבר להרים)	8th Note
2015	Od Shir Echad (עוד שיר אחד)	NMC United Entertainment Ltd
