= Yossi Banai =

Israeli entertainer (1932–2006)

- יוסי בנאי
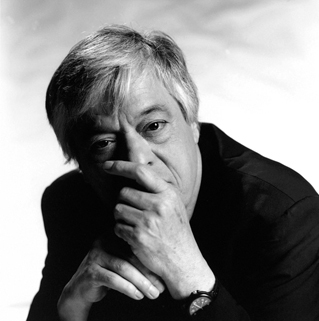
- Banai in 1998
- Born: Yosef Banai; 13 April 1932; Jerusalem, Mandatory Palestine
- Died: 11 May 2006 (aged 74); Tel Aviv, Israel
- Occupations: Actor; singer; songwriter; comedian; dramatist; theatre director
- Years active: 1955–2006
- Children: 3, including Yuval Banai
- Relatives: Banai family
- Musical career
- Genres: Israeli pop; chanson; Israeli rock; Piyyut
- Label: Hed Arzi Music

Yosef "Yossi" Banai (Hebrew: יוסף ״יוסי״ בנאי; 13 April 1932 – 11 May 2006) was an Israeli actor, singer, songwriter, comedian, and theatre director. He received the Israel Prize for Theater in 1998 and the Israeli Theater Prize in 2004. Banai was widely regarded as a prominent figure in Israeli performing arts.

== Biography ==
Banai was born in Jerusalem, Mandatory Palestine. He was raised in a large, impoverished family at 1 Agas Street near the Mahane Yehuda Market.

Banai dropped out of school in sixth grade. He would sneak into theater shows, began studying acting privately, and joined non-professional theater groups with friends and his brother Chaim Banai.

During his military service in the Israel Defense Forces, Banai became one of the early members of the Lehakat HaNahal in 1951 and continued studying acting with Fanny Lovitch as a teacher. Although discouraged by Lovitch from pursuing a theater career, he continued his training and was later accepted into the acting school of the Habima Theatre. In his mid-twenties, Banai left Habima to work independently and spent time in Paris. After returning to Israel, he appeared on theater and entertainment stages and worked with several theater companies.

Banai had a long association with playwright Nisim Aloni, appearing in premieres of Aloni’s plays, and also appeared in works by Hanoch Levin and Yaakov Shabtai. Banai co-founded the Theater of the Seasons in 1963 with Aloni and Avner Hizkiyahu; the company staged plays by Aloni and adaptations of works by writers including Anton Chekhov, Nikolai Gogol, and Fyodor Dostoevsky before closing after three years. Banai also wrote and performed solo cabaret-style revues and wrote and directed comic sketches, including for the comedy trio HaGashash HaHiver, which included his brother Gavri. His stage appearances included roles in The Government Inspector, A View from the Bridge, and The Caucasian Chalk Circle.

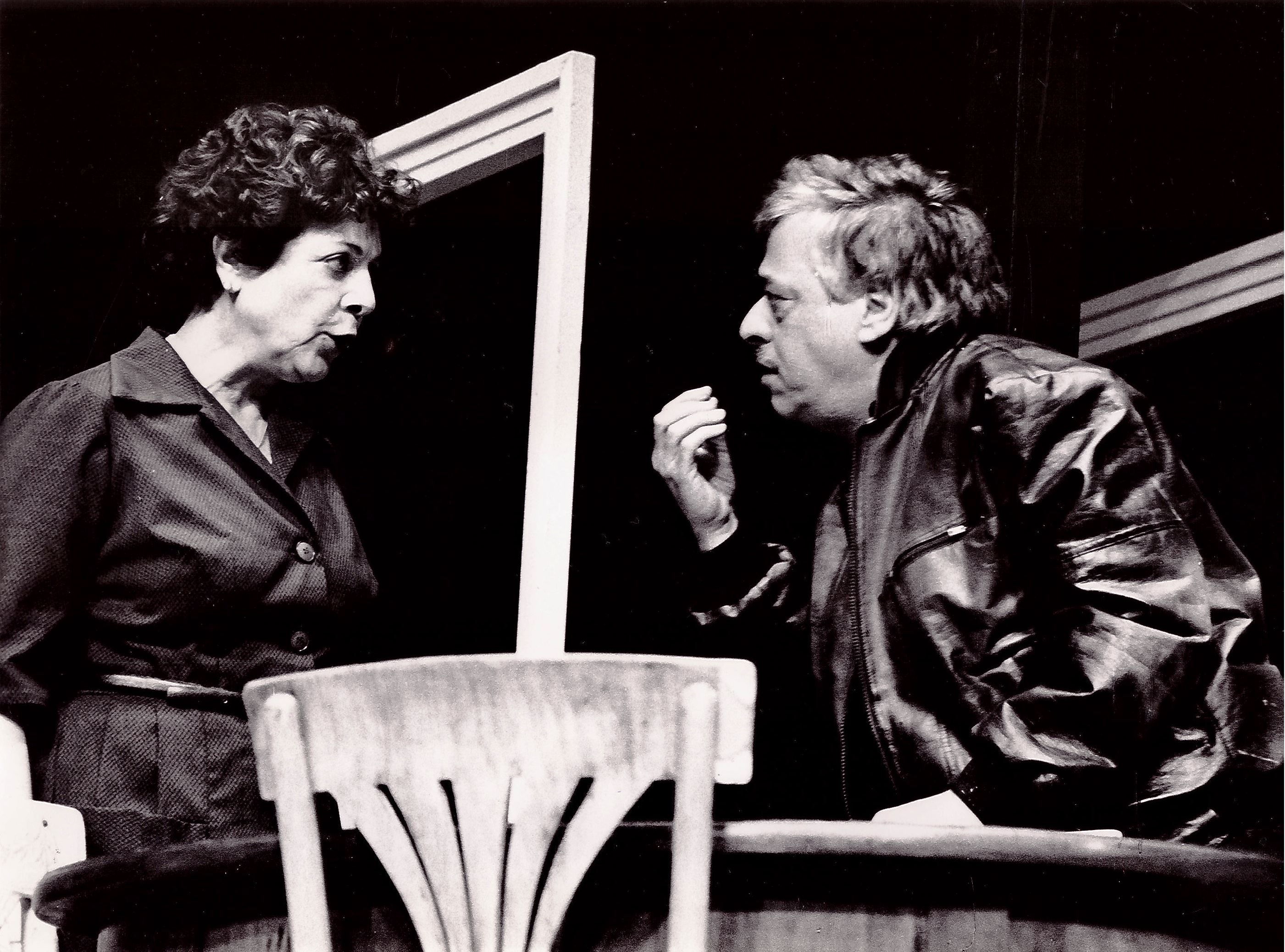
Yossi Banai and Rivka Gur in the play "Mirror Above the Bridge"

As a singer, Banai was known for performing French chansons, including works by Jacques Brel and Georges Brassens, often in Hebrew translations by Naomi Shemer, who also composed original songs for him. Banai and Shemer helped introduce chansons, a genre that was not widely familiar in Israel at the time, to Israeli audiences.

His final stage role was as King David in Keter Barosh by Yaakov Shabtai at the Habima Theatre, for which he received the Best Actor award at the Israeli Theater Awards in 2004.

== Personal life and death ==
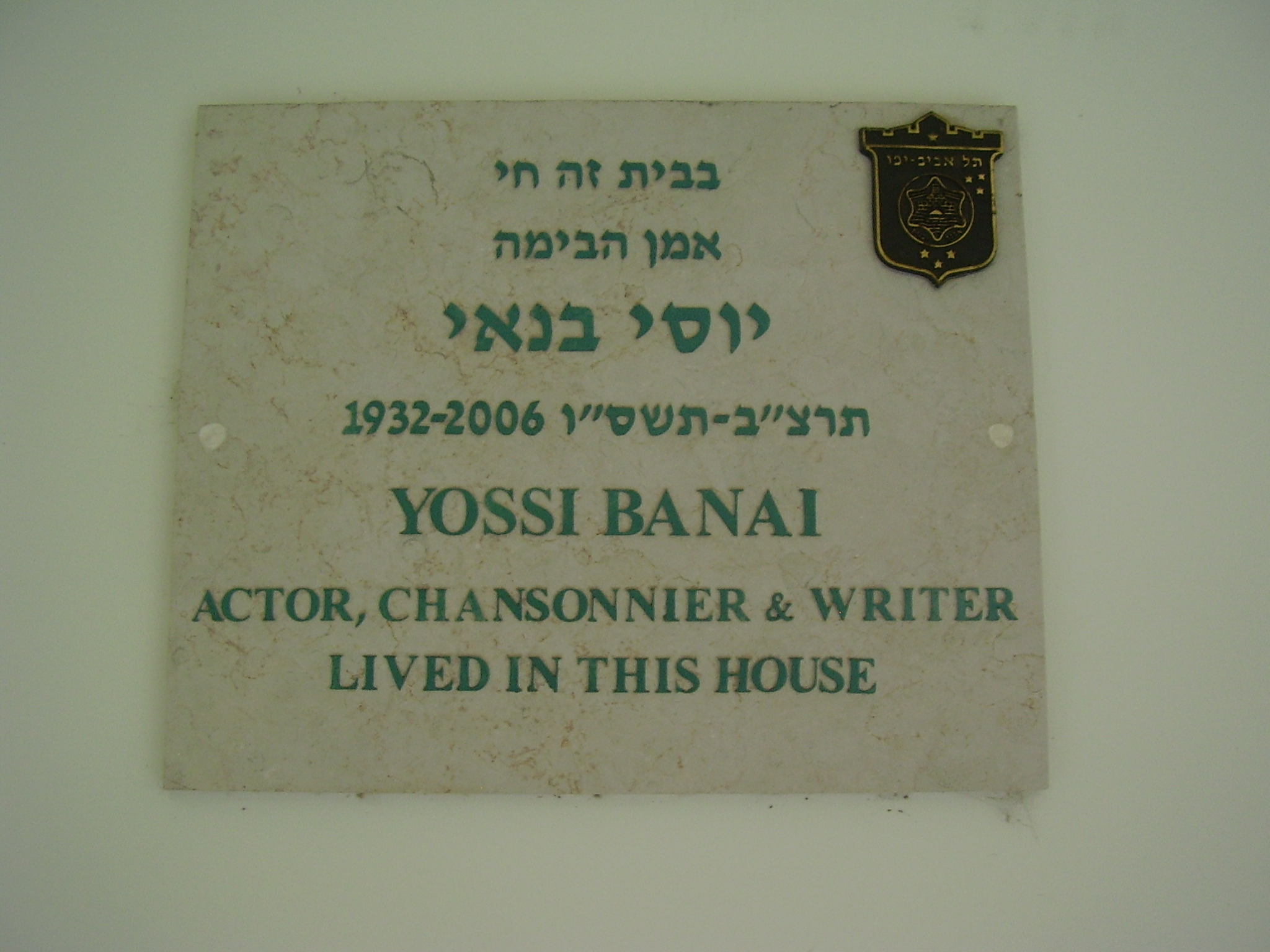
Memorial Plaque on the house of Yossi Banai

Banai was part of the first generation of the Banai performing family. He was the brother of entertainers Yaakov, Chaim, and Gavri Banai and the uncle of entertainers Ehud, Uri, Meʿir, Eviatar, and Orna Banai.

From his first marriage to Ilana, Banai had one son, Yuval Banai. From his second marriage to Aviva, he had two sons, Daniel and Ariel.

Banai died in Tel Aviv on May 11, 2006, at the age of 74 from cancer and was buried the following day in the Givat HaShlosha cemetery. Theaters across Israel held a minute of silence in his honor on the day of his death. Following his death, public figures and artists expressed admiration for his cultural role. Then-Prime Minister Ehud Olmert issued a government statement describing Banai as a figure of considerable talent in directing, theater, satire, film, and music, and noting that his voice played a central role in Israeli cultural life.

== Legacy and commemoration ==
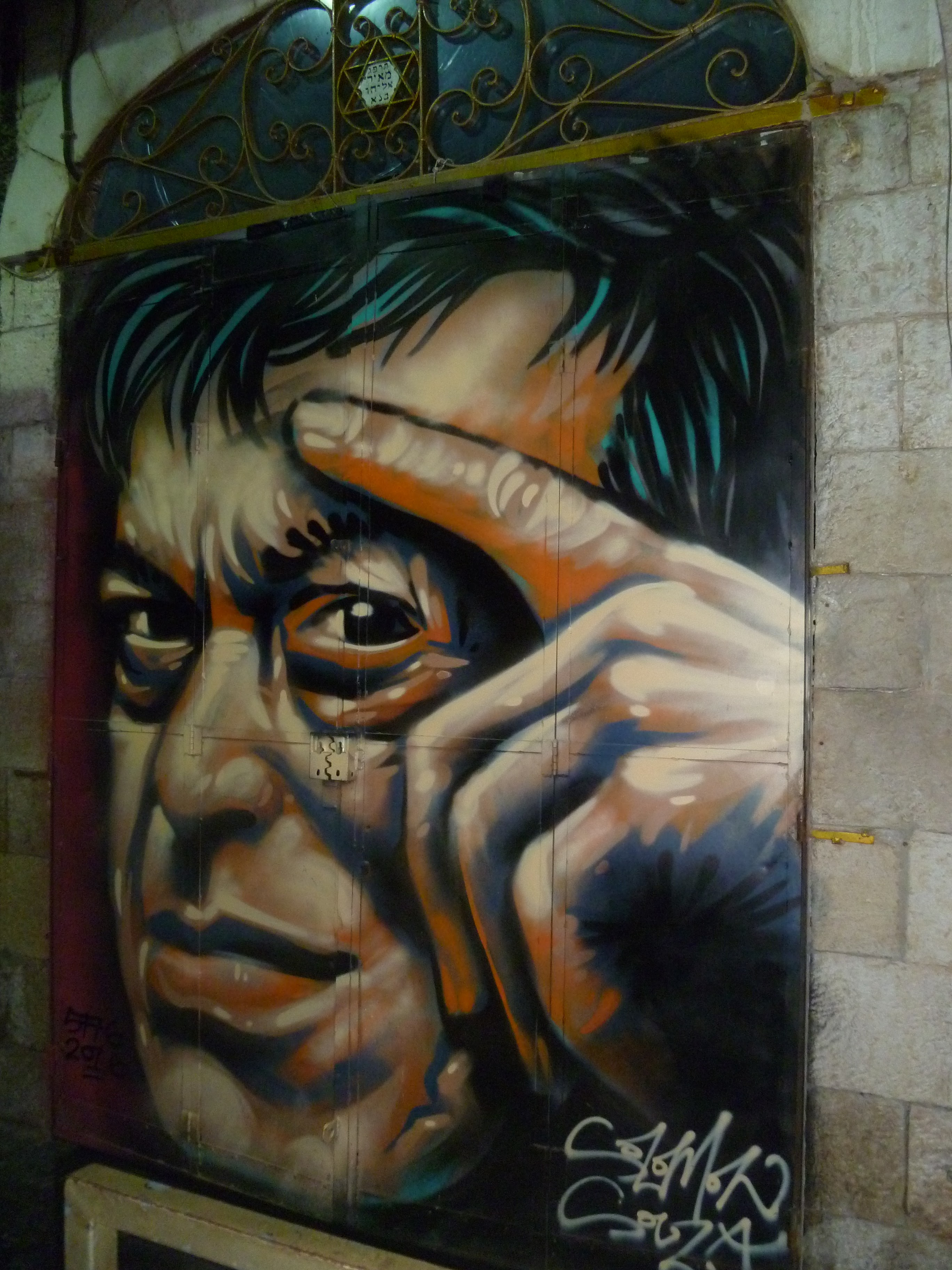
A mural of Yossi Banai in the Mahane Yehuda Market, Jerusalem

After Banai's death, his final single, Tarnegol Kaparot, composed by Micha Shitrit, was released in 2006.

Banai had a broad influence on Israeli culture. He was widely recognized as a theater actor and was active in both dramatic and comedic roles, including portrayals of royal and noble characters. In addition to acting, he wrote sketches, including for other performers, contributing to the development of a comedic style that influenced later entertainers and added expressions to spoken Hebrew. Among the expressions associated with the "White Dung Beetle Trio" are "Working on us", "Israbluff", "Is it radio?", and "The world is funny, so we laugh", which became widely used. His work was characterized by careful attention to language.

On April 22 2009, the Israeli Stamp Service issued a series of 12 postal stamps on the subject of Israeli music. One of the stamps in this collection was dedicated in memory of Banai. The stamp, with a portrait of Banai, was designed by the artist Miri Nestor Sofer. The stamp's tab included a line from Banai's hit song "Me and Simone and Little Mois" - "We were children and that was a long time ago".

== Awards ==
In 1998, Banai was awarded the Israel Prize for "stage arts – theatre" for his contribution to Israeli theatre.

== Filmography ==
Year	Title	Role	Notes
1962	Havura Shekazot		
1963	Af Milah L'Morgenstein		
1966	Fortuna	Yosef Buzaglo	
1967	Ervinka	Maurice	
1967	999 Aliza Mizrahi	Theodore Rothschild	
1972	Ha Glula		
1973	Haham Gamliel		
1994	Les Patriotes	Yossi	(final film role)

== See also ==
- List of Israel Prize recipients
