= Meir Banai =

Israeli singer-songwriter (1960–2017)

- מאיר בנאי
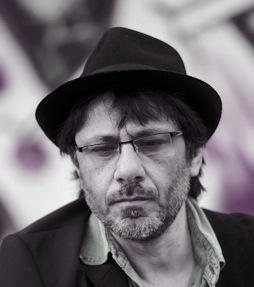
- Banai in 2013
- Born: 5 July 1960; Jerusalem, Israel
- Died: 12 January 2017 (aged 56); Hemed, Israel
- Occupation: Singer-songwriter
- Years active: 1981–2017
- Children: 2, including Noam Banai
- Relatives: Banai family
- Musical career
- Genres: Israeli pop; Israeli rock
- Instruments: Vocals; guitar; piano; drums
- Labels: CBS Records International; NMC Music

Meir Banai (Hebrew: מאיר בנאי; 5 July 1960 – 12 January 2017) was an Israeli musician, singer, and songwriter.

== Biography ==
Meir Banai was born in Jerusalem in 1960, the son of Yitzhak Banai, to a traditional Jewish family which has produced various actors and singers, such as Orna Banai, Eviatar Banai, Ehud Banai, Yuval Banai, and Yossi Banai.

In 1999, he and Arkadi Duchin collaborated on a very successful recording. Tal Sondak, who represented Israel at the Eurovision Song Contest in 2001, says that Banai was one of his musical influences. In March 2004, Banai made his U.S. debut at Makor in New York City.

Shma Koli ("Hear My Voice") in 2007 was a CD packed with traditional Jewish texts and prayers. The arrangements are based on traditional tunes but have been given a modern infusion. The single, "Lech Elay" became a hit as soon as it was released. Haaretz wrote that Banai, in composing some of the songs on his "excellent 'Jewish' album", created an upswing in the melody at key points in songs, in which the speaker/narrator lifts up his eyes to the heavens and calls upon God. As of February 2008, Shma Koli had sold more than 15,000 copies, according to NMC figures).

In February 2008, the Israeli lottery, Mifal HaPayis, announced that Banai was a winner of the Landau Award for Stage Arts, an award for excellence in the Arts. After not appearing together on stage for a decade, Arkadi Duchin and Banai performed together in April 2009. He released ten albums.

== Death ==
Banai died from esophageal cancer on 12 January 2017 in Hemed at the age of 56.

== Discography ==
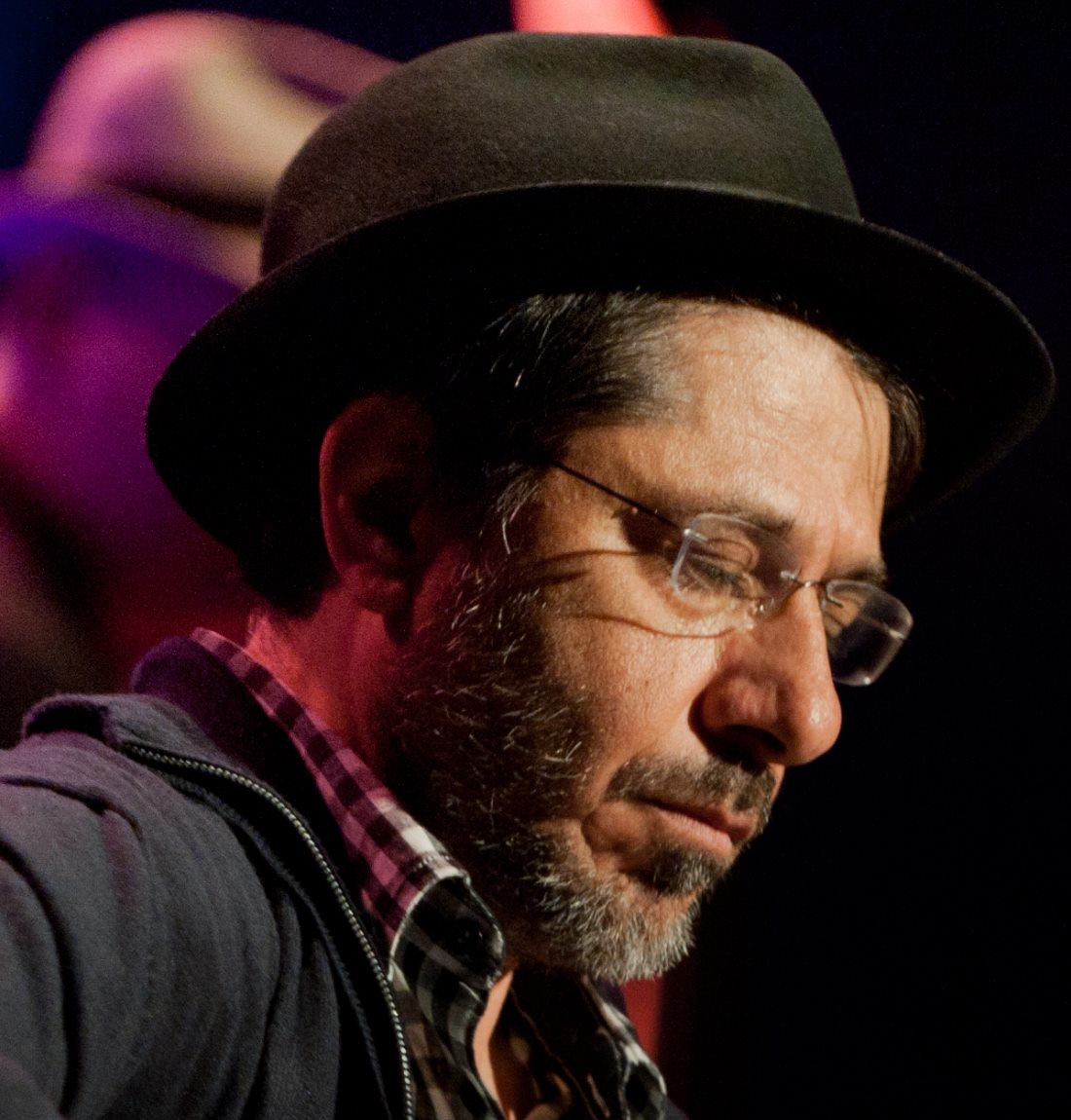
Banai in 2013

=== Albums ===
- The First Album (1984)
- Rain (1987)
- Impressions Live (1988)
- The Colors Change/Changing Colors (1990)
- Including/In Between (1992)
- The Wandering Tune (1996)
- Heart Cracked/Fractured Heart (2001)
- How Much Love (2002)
- Shma Koli (2007)
- Collections

== See also ==
- Music of Israel
