= Mayumi Kojima =

Japanese Shibuya-kei musician (born 1972)

Mayumi Kojima 小島麻由美
- Born: September 30, 1972 (age 53); Nakano, Tokyo, Japan
- Genres: Shibuya-Kei, Jazz, Blues, Bossa nova
- Occupations: Singer-songwriter, musician
- Instruments: Vocals, guitar, piano
- Years active: 1995–present
- Labels: AWDR/LR2 (2009–present); Pony Canyon (1995–2009)
- Website: kojimamayumi.com

Mayumi Kojima (小島麻由美, Kojima Mayumi; born September 30, 1972) is a Japanese Shibuya-kei musician. As of 2015, she has released 10 studio albums, 3 extended plays and several singles. Her music has been featured in multiple movies and television commercials. In the west, she is best known for her songs "Hatsukoi" (はつ恋), which was featured in a North American Nintendo commercial for the Game Boy Advance and the video game Super Mario Advance 4: Super Mario Bros. 3, and "Poltergeist" (ポルターガイスト, Porutāgaisuto), which was used as the opening theme song of the anime Ghost Hound.

== Life and career ==
Mayumi Kojima was born in Tokyo. When she was in high school, she heard some music by Rosemary Clooney and suddenly became captivated by American 50s music. But English lyrics were troublesome, so she decided to make her own music. In childhood, influenced by her brother, she enjoyed listening to classical music, but with the new influence of 50s and 60s pop, she wanted to cross jazzy rhythms with different musical genres like the old pop artists did. At the age of 18, she wrote her first song, "Manatsu no Umi" (真夏の海), and the demo tape was noticed by a record company. From then on, her life as a musician started. She made her debut release on July 21, 1995, with the single "Kekkonsōdanjo" (結婚相談所), and in 1998, having released 3 albums and 6 singles since her debut, she went on her first national tour.

Kojima's music was licensed by companies for use in commercials, the first of which were Calbee. This was followed by other commercials and use in other television media. In 1999, Kojima provided the song "Fūsen" (ふうせん) for the NHK TV program Minna no Uta. In addition, she was also in charge of animation for the song using her characteristic illustration style often seen on her album covers. In 2001, Nintendo aired a commercial in Japan for the Game Boy Advance which was later edited as a commercial for the video game Super Mario Advance 4 in the United States, in which Kojima's song, "Hatsukoi" (はつ恋), was featured. The original commercial was on air from 2001 to 2002 with the Super Mario Advance 4 variant being one of the first times non-Japanese people were exposed to her music. In 2005, Kojima's song "Poltergeist" (ポルターガイスト, Porutāgaisuto) was used as the opening theme song of Production I.G.'s 20th anniversary project, the anime Ghost Hound.

In 2015, as part of the celebration of the 20th anniversary of her debut, she collaborated with Israeli surf rock band Boom Pam to create the album With Boom Pam, which consists of new interpretations of some of her earlier songs in a new style influenced by Mediterranean surf rock. The album was released on July 22, 2015. On the same day, the limited edition commemorative album compilation La saison de Cécile 1995–1999 (セシルの季節, Seshiru no Kisetsu) was also released. It includes her three first albums, also called the Cécile trilogy, in new remastered UHQCD format with previously unreleased demos, instrumentals and alternate takes/mixes. Furthermore, the unfinished album Ai no Mirage (愛のミラージュ, Ai no Mirāju) is included.

== Discography ==
=== Albums ===
List of albums, with selected chart positions
Title	Album details	Peak positions
Title	Album details	JPN
Blues de Cécile (セシルのブルース, Seshiru no Burūsu)	Released: August 19, 1995 (JPN); Label: Pony Canyon; Formats: CD, LP, digital download	—
Hatachi no Koi (二十歳の恋, Hatachi no Koi) (L'Amour à 20ans)	Released: September 20, 1996 (JPN); Label: Pony Canyon; Formats: CD, LP, digital download	90
Sayonara Cécile (さよならセシル, Sayonara Seshiru) (Adieu, la saison de Cécile)	Released: June 17, 1998 (JPN); Label: Pony Canyon; Formats: CD, LP, digital download	19
My Name Is Blue	Released: September 5, 2001 (JPN); Label: Pony Canyon; Formats: CD, LP, digital download	14
Ai no Poltergeist (愛のポルターガイスト, Ai no Porutāgaisuto) (Ai no Poltergeist: Sounds of Kojima Mayumi)	Released: January 16, 2003 (JPN); Label: Pony Canyon; Formats: CD, LP, digital download	17
Sweetheart of Pablo (パブロの恋人, Paburo no Koibito)	Released: September 15, 2004 (JPN); Label: Pony Canyon; Formats: CD, LP, digital download	47
Swingin' Caravan! (スウィンギン・キャラバン, Suwingin Kyaraban)	Released: March 15, 2006 (JPN); Label: Pony Canyon; Formats: CD, digital download	77
Blue Rondo (ブルーロンド, Burū Rondo)	Released: February 3, 2010 (JPN); Label: AWDR/LR2; Formats: CD, LP, digital download	42
On the Road (路上, Rojō)	Released: December 3, 2014 (JPN); Label: AWDR/LR2; Formats: CD, LP, digital download; Note: Instrumental album was also released	86
With Boom Pam	Released: July 22, 2015 (JPN); Label: AWDR/LR2; Formats: CD, digital download	138
Cover Songs	Released: December 2, 2015 (JPN); Label: AWDR/LR2; Formats: CD, digital download	118
Alternative titles in parentheses

=== Extended plays ===
List of extended plays, with selected chart positions
Title	Album details	Peak positions
Title	Album details	JPN
Omokage (面おもかげ影, Omo Omokage Kage)	Released: November 19, 2003 (JPN); Label: Pony Canyon; Formats: CD, digital download	84
Kojima Mayumi's Paperback	Released: September 21, 2005 (JPN); Label: Pony Canyon; Formats: Book/CD	—
On the Beach (渚にて, Nagisa ni te)	Released: July 9, 2014 (JPN); Label: AWDR/LR2; Formats: CD, digital download	71

=== Singles ===
List of singles, with selected chart positions
Title	Single details	Peak positions
Title	Single details	JPN
"Kekkonsōdanjo" (結婚相談所)	Released: July 21, 1995 (JPN); Label: Pony Canyon; Formats: CD, digital download	—
"Koi no Kokuraku Tokkyū" (恋の極楽特急)	Released: November 17, 1995 (JPN); Label: Pony Canyon; Formats: CD, digital download	—
"Sensei no Okiniiri" (先生のお気に入り)	Released: February 12, 1996 (JPN); Label: Pony Canyon; Formats: CD, digital download	—
"Manatsu no Umi" (真夏の海)	Released: June 5, 1996 (JPN); Label: Pony Canyon; Formats: CD, digital download	—
Hatsukoi/Oshaberi! Oshaberi! (はつ恋／おしゃべり！おしゃべり！)	Released: June 18, 1997 (JPN); Label: Pony Canyon; Formats: CD, digital download	95
"Cécile Cat Blues" (セシルカットブルース, Seshiru Katto Burūsu)	Released: May 20, 1998 (JPN); Label: Pony Canyon; Formats: CD, digital download	—
"Mayonaka no Party" (真夜中のパーティー, Mayonaka no Pātii)	Released: December 2, 1998 (JPN); Label: Pony Canyon; Formats: CD, digital download	94
"Fūsen" (ふうせん) ("Ballon à Jouer")	Released: March 3, 1999 (JPN); Label: Pony Canyon; Formats: CD, digital download	92
"Rokudenashi" (ろくでなし)	Released: September 1, 1999 (JPN); Label: Pony Canyon; Formats: CD, digital download	—
"Waiwaiwai" (わいわいわい)	Released: April 18, 2001 (JPN); Label: Pony Canyon; Formats: CD, digital download	48
"Amai Koi" (甘い恋)	Released: August 1, 2001 (JPN); Label: Pony Canyon; Formats: CD, digital download	73
"Rocksteady Girl" (ロック ステディ ガール, Rakku Sutedi Gāru)	Released: April 17, 2002 (JPN); Label: Pony Canyon; Formats: CD, digital download	40
"Itoshi no Kids" (愛しのキッズ, Itoshi no Kizzu)	Released: September 19, 2002 (JPN); Label: Pony Canyon; Formats: CD, digital download	73
"Blue Melody" (ブルーメロディ, Burū Merodi)	Released: September 1, 2004 (JPN); Label: Pony Canyon; Formats: CD, digital download	94
"Merry! Go! Round!" (メリーゴーランド, Merii Gō Rando)	Released: September 1, 2009 (JPN); Label: AWDR/LR2; Formats: CD, digital download	71
"Arabesque" (アラベスク, Arabesuku)	Released: November 11, 2009 (JPN); Label: AWDR/LR2; Formats: CD, digital download	83
Awa ni Natta Koi/Tsukikage no Napoli (泡になった恋／月影のナポリ(Tintarella di luna))	Released: July 9, 2014 (JPN); Label: AWDR/LR2; Formats: LP	—
"Yūhi ga Naiteiru" (夕陽が泣いている)	Released: August 2, 2014 (JPN); Label: HMV; Formats: LP; Note: HMV Exclusive, 200 Pressings Limited Edition	—
Alternative titles in parentheses

=== Live albums ===
List of live albums, with selected chart positions
Title	Album details	Peak positions
Title	Album details	JPN
Songs for Gentlemen	Released: February 17, 2000 (JPN); Label: Pony Canyon; Formats: CD, digital download	44

=== Compilations ===
List of compilation albums, with selected chart positions
Title	Album details	Peak positions
Title	Album details	JPN
Me and My Monkey on the Moon	Released: December 6, 2000 (JPN); Label: Pony Canyon; Formats: CD, digital download	44
A Musical Biography 2001-2007	Released: September 5, 2007 (JPN); Label: Pony Canyon; Formats: CD, digital download	87
La saison de Cécile 1995-1999 (セシルの季節, Seshiru no Kisetsu)	Released: July 22, 2015 (JPN); Label: Pony Canyon; Formats: CD	109

=== DVDs ===
Title	Details
Blues de la Cécile (セシル座のブルース, Seshiru Za no Burūsu)	Released: March 19, 2003 (JPN); Label: Pony Canyon; Formats: VHS, DVD; Type: Music video
GALACTiKA 07	Released: November 3, 2004 (JPN); Label: Albatros / Dub; Formats: DVD; Type: Live, interview
Blue Rondo Live!	Released: November 24, 2010 (JPN); Label: Uplink; Formats: DVD, CD; Type: Live
