= Amir Banai =

Israeli actor

- אמיר בנאי
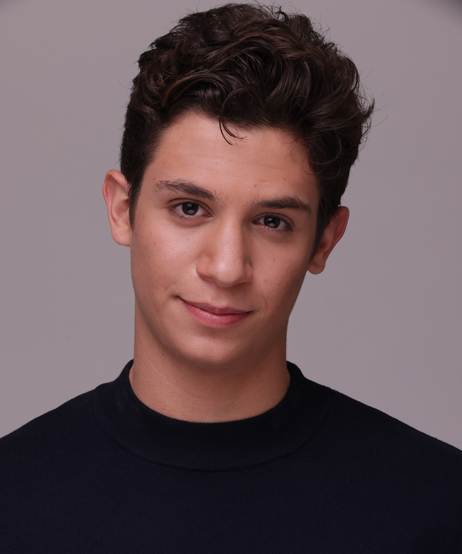
- Born: 8 December 2003 (age 22); Tel Aviv, Israel
- Occupation: Actor
- Years active: 2015–present
- Parents: Aharon Barnea (father); Orna Banai (mother)
- Relatives: Or Barnea (paternal half-brother); Banai family

Amir Banai (Hebrew: אמיר בנאי; born 8 December 2003) is an Israeli actor.
