= Mashina =

Israeli pop rock band (1983-1995, 2003-present)

Mashina משינה
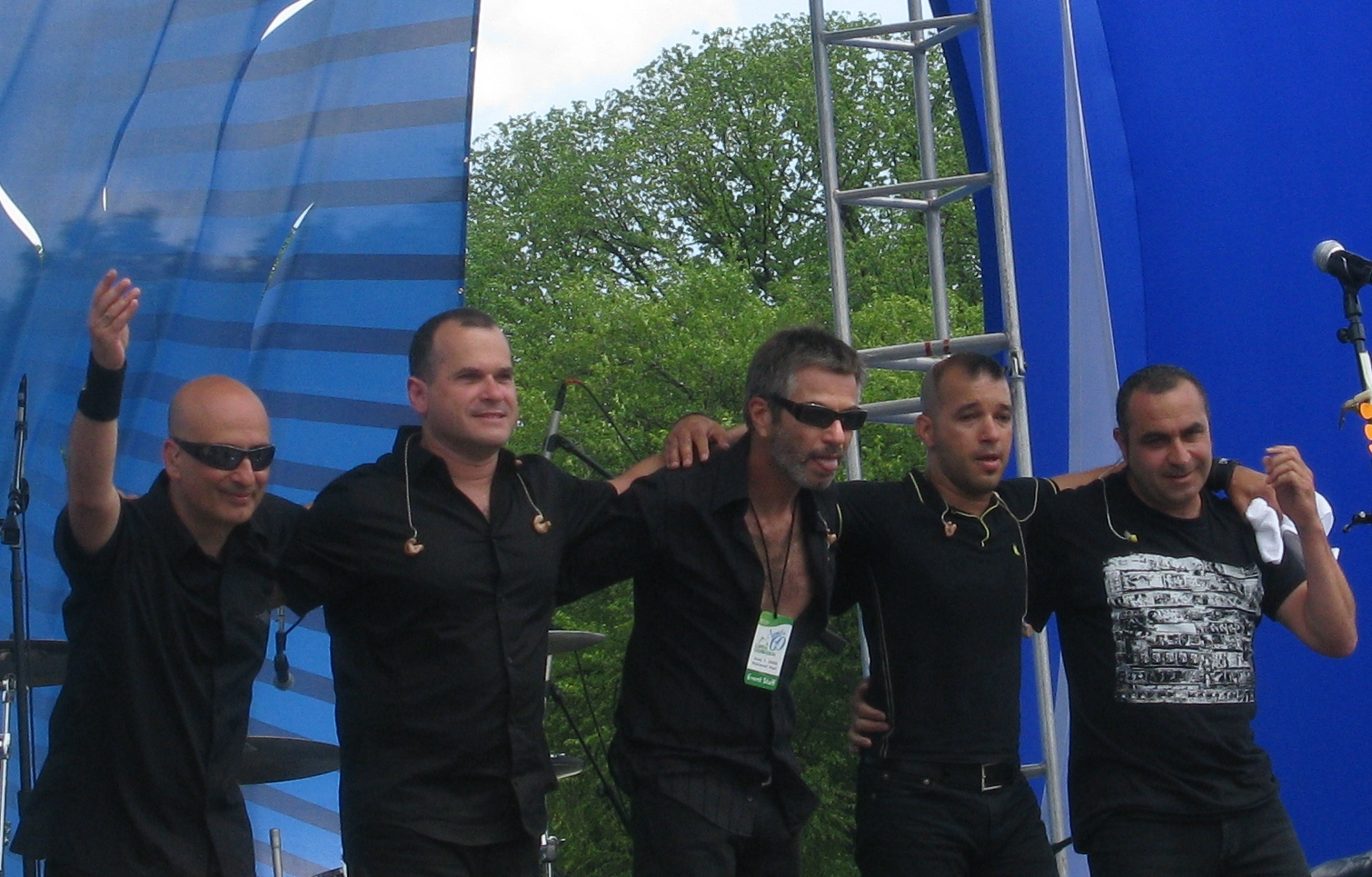

Background information
- Origin: Tel Aviv, Israel
- Genres: Pop rock; new wave; ska; alternative rock; hard rock
- Years active: 1983–1995, 2003–present
- Members: Yuval Banai; Shlomi Bracha; Avner Hodorov; Michael Benson; Iggy Dayan
- Website: www.mashina.co.il

Mashina (Hebrew: משינה) are an Israeli pop rock band which was active from 1983 to 1995, and then again from 2003 to the present. Their musical style took inspiration from ska and hard rock, among others.

The band was formed in 1983 by lead vocalist Yuval Banai and guitarist Shlomi Bracha. In late 1985, the band released its first album, self-titled, in which, alongside Banai and Bracha, bassist Michael Benson and drummer Iggy Dayan participated.

After the album was released, keyboardist Avner Hodorov joined the band, and its lineup has remained unchanged since then. The band achieved great success and popularity, but in 1995 it disbanded. During its farewell performance on July 18 of that year, a tragedy occurred at the Arad Music Festival, where three teenagers waiting for the performance died due to the overcrowding at the entrance.

Until its disband in 1995, the band released seven studio albums and one compilation album. In 2003, when the band resumed its activities, it has since released two live albums and three additional studio albums.

== History ==
=== Formation ===
Yuval Banai and Shlomi Bracha first met in their youth, and later sang together for five months in the rookie base of the Artillery Corps in Shavei Shomron. During their off-duty hours from the army, the two used to hang out at the "Penguin" club, and influenced by the bands that played there, they decided to form a band. Initially, Banai rejected the idea of forming a band, claiming he didn't know how to sing. However, he eventually agreed, influenced by the bands Minimal Compact and Jean Conflict of Rami Fortis. This decision was made after Bracha insisted that Fortis also didn't know how to sing, according to Banai's claim.

Later on, Banai recounted:

"I arrived there pretty dispirited, to that base, and they put me in a room and said to me, 'This is your partner, Mr. Shlomi Bracha'. And there, in Shomron, the Mashina band was formed. I spent five months there with Shlomi, who was a sergeant of operations in the artillery. I had a tape recorder and music, and he had a guitar. I liked to listen to music, and he liked to play in the room. So, one day he said to me, 'Listen, I play. You have a good voice; maybe you can sing from time to time'. And that's how we started writing songs, songs of despair such as: 'When will we be released, when will the war end...'"

At the military base, Banai and Bracha started writing the songs that later were included in the first album of the band, including "Rakevet Layla" (Night Train), "Karim Abdoul Zemer", "Atid Matok" (Sweet Future), and "Optikai Meduplam" (A Certified Optician). The band had its first performance at that base, where Banai sang and Bracha played the guitar, accompanied by a drummer and another guitarist. The name of the band, "Mashina," was chosen before the performance. When Banai and Bracha asked their friend in the base, who came from the Soviet Union, how to say "Table of Despair" in Russian, he replied with "Mashina Vremeni" (Машина Времени - "Time Machine"). Mashina Vremeni is also the name of a popular Russian rock band.

After the release of Banai and Bracha from the army in 1983, the foundation for the band began to take shape. Through friends, Banai met guitarist Oren Eliazeri and bassist Michael Benson. Benson distanced himself from the band's initial style which was somewhat alternative, but suggested Nivi Lifshitz as the drummer. The band started rehearsing with a lineup that included Banai, Bracha, Eliazeri, Lifshitz, and keyboardist Rami Haimov.

Later, Lifshitz left, and instead of her, Dudi Levin joined the band. With this lineup, the band performed several times at the "Penguin" club, and their performances were successful. In these performances, the band sang songs composed by Banai and Bracha during their military service, with most of the songs in English. The performances were characterized by punk and ska styles, influenced by the flourishing new wave bands in Tel Aviv. They integrated motifs from the new wave style with Eastern and oriental themes. Keyboardist Rami Haimov continued to play with the band for a short time and then left to study at the Juilliard School in New York.

In one of the band's performances at the "Penguin," Michael Benson watched, and afterward, he asked to join the band. At his request, drummer Igi Dayan was also added, replacing Dudi Levin. The atmosphere during the band's rehearsals at that time was quite tense, and many disputes arose between Banai and Bracha. The tensions escalated when Bnei took on the lead role in the movie "Makat Shemesh," and as a result, he was absent from rehearsals for several months. In March 1984, the band's last performance with its original lineup took place at Cinema "Dan", and upon finishing the performance, the band members announced its breakup. The breakup was part of a wave of rock band dissolutions that played in Tel Aviv clubs during that period and part of the fading rock scene.

After the breakup, the paths of the band members diverged. Banai, Eliyazri, and Dayan formed the band "Shalom Hatzibur," which played in various clubs in Tel Aviv. Their performances did not achieve great success, but Banai expressed his art in them. The band released two radio singles, both written by Banai and composed by Eliyazri: "November 1" and "Yanshuf Al Anaf Gavoha". Simultaneously, Bracha and Benson formed the band "HaChazit HaAmamit". As part of this band, Bracha created two songs that were later included in Mashina's debut album, "Aval Ein" and "Balada LeSochen Kaful", originally written in English. During the same period, Dayan and Benson participated in several additional recordings, such as in the album by Danni Bassan.

In 1985, Banai, Bracha, and Benson coincidentally met, decided to revive the band, and scheduled a performance for Purim of that year at the "Penguin" club. Eliyazri attended only this performance and subsequently left the band. Thus, the lineup for the debut album of "Mashina" was formed, consisting of Banai, Bracha, Benson, and Dayan.

=== Initial success ===
The first two songs recorded by the band were sketches for the songs "Optikai Meduplam" and "Rakevet Layla", composed by Bracha during his military service. The song "Optikai Meduplam" was originally titled "Difficulties in Agriculture," and the band initially performed a different version of the song "Rakevet Layla" in their performances at the "Penguin" club, with a different set of lyrics. Bracha was not satisfied with the lyrics, so Banai passed the song to his brother, Ehud Banai, who rewrote the lyrics.

In their search for a record company to produce their album, the band members encountered a refusal. Ronnie Brown from the Helicon company expressed interest, but the company was then in its infancy, and without enough money to the band a worthy contract. Following this, the band members recorded the song "Optician Meduplam" professionally, at DB Studios. Based on the music on the albums of Danny Bassan, Rami Kleinstein and Rita, Michael Benson met the technician Reuven Shapira, who worked on the recordings as a technician and as a production partner. At the same time, the band recorded three more songs: "Night Train", "Because she didn't feel like it" and "Ballad for a double agent". In June 1985, the band's first radio record, "Opticai Meduplam", was released to radio stations. The song was a success, following which Udi Hennis of NMC was convinced to sign the band.

At the end of July 1985, the band's second radio record, "Because she doesn't feel like" (Hebrew: כי לא בא לה), was released. After that, the band members recorded the rest of the songs on the album, which was released in November of the same year and was called "Mashina". Close to the release of the album, the song "Night Train" was released as a single, which was a great success and is considered one of the band's biggest hits.

Most of the album's songs were written and composed by Bracha, from which "Atid Matok" and "Ballad for a double agent" were also published. Another song from the album that was a success was "Anna", written by Orly Silbersatz, who later became Yuval Banai's wife, and composed by Banai and Dayan. The musical arrangements were performed by all the members of the band together with Reuven Shapira, except for the song "The cannon rings twice", which they arranged together with Yaron Becher. The joint work of the band members in the arrangement of the songs continued in all her other albums.

The band's debut album was a great success, reaching platinum album status within six months, on August 28, 1986, for selling 50,000 copies. Later, its sales reached about 65,000 copies. Following the album, Mashina won the title of "Band of the Year" in the annual Hebrew hymn parade of Reshet Gimel for the Jewish year 5566 (1986).

In the preparations for the tour that accompanied the first album, the band members were looking for a keyboardist, and Benson recommended Avner Khodorov, whom he knew from his military service. Khodorov was in the United States at the time, and when he returned he met with Benson and Barcha for rehearsals, and was accepted into the band as a hired player for the performances.

Khodorov's addition to the band enabled the inclusion of another musical instrument in its performances, a saxophone, which he played in addition to keyboards. The first song of the band in which Khodorov participated was "She argued with him for hours", which he wrote while working on the first album. The song, which was not included on the album, was recorded in January and released as a single in April 1986. This song was also a success.

On February 28, 1986, the band started a concert tour, at the "Sapir" cinema in Kiryat Bialik. These performances were a great success, and all their tickets were sold in advance. Following their success, the band moved on to perform in larger venues as well, such as the Heichal HaTarbut in Tel Aviv, where the band performed for the first time on April 21. The tour ended the day before the end of the summer vacation, on August 31, 1986, in the Yarkon Park, with crowd of about 50,000 people, or between 200,000 and 400,000 people according to other estimates. The performance was opened by Danni Bassan, a former T-Slam member.

=== Deterioration ===
Following Khodorov's inclusion in the band during the tour, he became a constant member of the band while working on their second album. The band had no songs ready at the time, and therefore its members decided to create songs together. Accordingly, the composition credit for all the songs on Mashina's second album was given to all the band members, even though some of the songs were composed by only one band member, such as "We are two" composed by Banai or "Send Me an Angel" composed by Bracha. Due to the feeling of a complete work that cannot be disassembled, the band members decided to distribute the album without preliminary singles to the radio stations.

The second album of Mashina, "Mashina 2", was released in June 1987. The album was much less successful than its predecessor, and for the first months after its release, only about 5,000 copies were sold. In the absence of singles, the album's songs were not played on the radio stations, and only after the failure became clear did the band members decide to release songs as singles.

Out of these songs, "Send Me an Angel" and "We are two" written by Banai and "Everything is still possible" written by Banai and Benson and Sher Benson were successful. Several guest musicians participated in the album, including Yuval Mesner who played the cello in two songs and David Khodorov, Avner's father, who played the violin in the song "Everything is still possible".

A children's choir also participates in this song, in December the band participated in the Children's Song Festival number 17 with the song "Zero fell from a high tree" which won third place.

In 1987, "Mashina" won the title of "Band of the Year" in the annual song parade of Reshet Gimel for the second time in a row, but only one song from the second album, "Shlah Li Malach" ("Send Me an Angel"), made it to this parade. The performances that accompanied the album were also not successful, and only a few dozens of people attended the band's first shows at the Tzavta club.

The rest of Mashina's performances at the time were conducted only in small venues, such as schools and amusement parks. Despite the failure in the period after its release, the album continued to sell in the following years, and in 1995 its sales were estimated at 18,000 copies.

=== Renewed success ===
In 1988, the band members decided to use an outside person to collaborate with them in working on a new show, and turned to the songwriter and music producer Yaakov Gilad.

When the idea to record a new song before the show was brought up, the band members played five songs for Gilad, including "On the Way to the Sea", "Rani in Paris" and the instrumental "The Machine's Dance". All three were written by Bracha. The goal was to record only one song, and the song chosen was "On the way to the sea".

The song was originally written for the tour of the first album of "Mashina", and with the help of Gilad he wrote it as a prelude to his familiar version. Since the band had time left to record in the studio, it was decided to also record the songs "Ranny in Paris" and "Machine Dance" at the same time.

In November 1988, the song "On the Way to the Sea" was released as a single to the radio stations. The song was a success, reaching the top of the song charts. Following the success of the song, Gilad compiled a compilation album of the band called "Ladies and Gentlemen: Mashina", which included songs from their first three albums, alongside the three new songs.

Additional songs that were added to the album are "She argued with him for hours", recorded in 1986 and it was the first album in which it was included, and a version of the children's song "Why Does the Zebra Wear Pajamas" by Ayin Hillel and Dov Seltzer, which the band recorded as part of the Children's Poets Songs Festival. Later, the songs "The Machine's Dance" and "Ranny in Paris" were also released as singles, which also reached the top of the song charts.

After the release of "Ladies and Gentlemen" the members of "Mashina" began work on their next album, "The Association for the Study of Mortality" (HaAmuta LeHeker HaTmuta). The album was mostly created by Bracha, who wrote his songs in about three months. Banai heard the sketches of the songs and suggested a number of corrections, which was expressed in a joint writing credit for Barakah and Banai on some of the songs on the album.

The album was released in August 1990, and continued the success of "Ladies and Gentlemen". It included many hits, such as "So why should I bother with politics now?", "The stars are lit on a small fire", "The association for the study of mortality", "I will wait for you in the fields" and "Car". In total, the album sold about 54,000 copies.

=== Fame Monsters album ===
After the release of "The Association for the Study of Mortality" (העמותה לחקר התמותה) and in the middle of the concert tour that accompanied the album, the members of "Mashina" felt tired, and decided to temporarily stop their activities. During this period, the band members engaged in personal musical projects, something that had been prevented from them until then according to a contract.

Several other band members participated in some of the personal projects. For example, Yuval Banai produced Orli Zilbrashtz's album "Miranda's Cabaret" and composed most of his songs, and Khudorov, Dayan and Benson played on the album.

Banai also composed the song "Where are I and where are they" for his father Yossi Banai, in which the band members also participated in playing. Dayan released a solo album called "Something from you", in which Khodorov played two songs as a guest. Bracha produced the album of the band "Nosei HaMigba'at" "Who murdered Aganatha Falskog".

The work with the band "Noshai Mgavat" exposed Bracha to a new style of music, which influenced Mashina's next album, "Fame Monsters" (מפלצות התהילה). The album was quite different from the band's previous albums, and was mostly characterized by alternative rock, metal and heavy rock styles, influenced by bands such as "Pixies", "Sonic Youth" and "Public Image Ltd". For the first time in this album Banai wrote most of the songs, and also composed some of them.

The album "Fame Monsters" was released in April 1992 on the label founded by the band members, "Zebra Records", named after the song "Why does the zebra wear pajamas". The songs "You come to visit", "Eize Ish", "The Mermaid", "It all started in Nasser" and "There is no other place" were released as singles, but were not successful on the radio stations. Nevertheless, the album sold about 15,000 copies in the first months after its release, and after about ten years it reached the status of a gold album.

The concert tour that accompanied the "Fame Monsters" began in June 1992, with two shows in Shefayim that were not successful. Following their failure, the band moved to perform in smaller venues, but even these performances did not last long. At that time, following the failure of the singles from the album on the radio stations, the band released a new single, "I love you Michelle", which was presented as a song from a fictitious movie called "Give me the white in the back". This song was also not successful.

=== Emotional Peak album ===
The next project of Mashina was the album Si HaReg'esh (Hebrew: שיא הרגש) which is translated as "emotional peak". After Banai and Bracha had created several songs for the album, they came up with the idea of creating a rock opera with a narrative story. Thus, through the story, the band members could justify their return to the styles of rock and roll and rhythm and blues.

Banai and Baraka created a story about a planet controlled by a tyrant named "Levi Metal", who ruled through a public address system produced by a drug called "Metal Noise". "Levi Metal" fought a guy named "Pahei Show", who played blues songs and thus would eliminate the "metal noise". This is how loud songs were created for the album, which characterized "Levi Metal", alongside quieter songs, which characterized "Pahei Show".

Eventually, the rock opera idea was shelved, and the album mostly contains quiet songs. The people of the NMC company had second thoughts about the sketches that the band recorded for the rock opera, so the album was released by Hed Artzi.

In April 1993, the first single for the album was released, "Touched the Sky" (Hebrew: נגעה בשמיים) written and composed by Banai, which became one of the biggest hits of the album. In July 1993 the full album was released. Most of its songs were written and composed by Bracha, with the exceptions being two songs written and composed by Banai, "Touched the Sky" and "Mrs. Sarah the Neighbor", which was also a success. Among the songs Bracha wrote, "Danny" and "Pahei Show" were successful. The album reached gold album status in about two weeks, and later reached platinum album status.

== Goodbye Youth, Hello Love and disbandment ==
In January 1994 the members of Mashina started working on their next album. This album was produced by the band members alone, with Benson serving as the album's producer and Khudorov as the recording technician. The band had enough material for two whole albums, one written entirely by Banai and one written entirely by Bracha, and there was a debate as to which of the songs to record.

When Bracha and Dayan were absent from the band's rehearsals for about two weeks due to illness, Banai, Benson and Khodorov began working on the songs Banai had written. This is how the foundation was created for the band's last album before its disbandment, "Goodbye Youth Hello Love" (Hebrew: להתראות נעורים שלום אהבה), and all of its songs were written and composed by Banai.

== Aftermath ==
After the army service the two split up; Banai formed the band "Shlom Ha-Tzibur" ("Public Safety"), while Bracha teamed up with bassist Michael Benson to form the band "HaChazit Ha'amamit" ("The Popular Front"). In 1984 they decided to combine to form a new band, which they called Mashina, bringing in drummer Iggy Dayan; in 1985, they released their self-titled debut, which quickly became a hit on the Israeli charts. Later, Avner Hodorov joined the band on keyboard and saxophone. They gained widespread popularity in Israel during the late 1980s and early 1990s.

In May 1995, the band announced their retirement and put together four heavily publicized farewell shows. What would have been their fourth and final performance, in Arad, Israel, ended when three of the spectators were crushed to death by the crowd before the band went onstage. The band played another farewell concert several months later at Yarkon Park, which they dedicated to those three fans.

After Mashina broke up, Banai released 3 solo albums: "Yuval Banai" (1997), "Rashi Dub" (1999) (produced by bass player Yossi Fine) and "Nish'ar BaMakom" ("Staying in Place") (2001). Bracha released a solo album, and Benson co-founded the electronic-rock group Atmosfire, which came out with one album.

The band re-formed in 2003 and began touring and releasing albums again. On October 8, 2006, the band performed at the opening ceremony of the 27th Acco Festival of Alternative Israeli Theatre.

Mashina has gone on several North American tours, playing in cities including Philadelphia, New York, Boston, Toronto, Washington and Los Angeles.

Banai and Bracha served as co-mentors on season 2 of The Voice Israel, in 2012–2013.

=== 2020s: 40th anniversary and wartime activity ===
In 2023 and 2024, following the outbreak of the Gaza war, Mashina performed for IDF soldiers on the front lines and for evacuees from southern and northern Israel. In 2024, the band celebrated its 40th anniversary with a national tour titled "Touching the Sky" (Nog'im Bashamayim). The tour featured a return to major venues such as Caesarea Amphitheater and Sultan's Pool. In July 2025, they released the live album Mashina Plays the 70s (Mashina Menagenet et Shnot HaShivim).

== Musical styles ==
The musical growth of Mashina can be mapped to different influences across their albums. Their early sound was obviously imitative of ska bands like Madness; they didn't bother to hide the influence, titling what became one of their earliest hit songs "Rakevet Laila Le-Kahir" ("Night Train to Cairo"), a homage to Madness' "Night Boat to Cairo", or "Geveret Sarah Hashchena" ("Miss Sarah, the Neighbour") that copied the theme, music and opening lyrics of Bob Dylan's "The Hurricane". Their subsequent albums combined reggae, punk rock and Middle Eastern elements. "Ha'Amuta Le-Heker Hatmuta" ("The Society for the Study of Mortality") has sounds influenced by the Cure, Miflatzot Ha-Tehila ("The Monsters of Fame") has sounds influenced by the Pixies and grunge, Si Ha-Regesh ("Peak of Excitement") has the blues influence of Pink Floyd, and Lehitra'ot Ne'urim Shalom Ahava ("Goodbye Youth, Hello Love") presents the anthemic quality of U2 and Simple Minds.

== Band members ==
- Yuval Banai - vocals, acoustic guitar
- Shlomi Bracha - electric guitar
- Iggy Dayan - drums
- Avner Hodorov - keyboard, saxophone, accordion
- Michael Benson - bass guitar, vocals
- Supporting members:
  - Ilan Gozal - Management
  - Yossi Lugassi - sound
  - Izhar Rhozental - light
  - Ilan Lamdan - sound monitor
  - Amalia Banai - video editor
  - Ofir Sonnenschein - back stage

== Discography ==
=== Albums ===
Year	Album	Israel certificate
1985	Mashina	2× platinum
1987	Mashina 2	Gold
1988	Mashina 3	Gold
1990	Ha'Amuta Le-Heker Hatmuta ("The Institute for the Study of Mortality")	Platinum
1992	Miflatzot Ha-Tehila ("Monsters of Fame")	Gold
1993	Si Ha-Regesh ("Peak of Emotion")	Platinum
1995	Lehitraot Neurim Shalom Ahava ("Goodbye Youth Hello Love")	Platinum
1995	Mechonat Ha-Zman ("The Time Machine")	Platinum
2003	Mashina Live 2003	Gold
2005	Romantika Atidanit ("Futuristic Romance")	Gold
2010	Yahalomim Bashamaim ("Diamonds in the Sky")	
2018	Metim Sharim Holhim ("We Die, We Sing, We Go")	
2025	Mashina Menagenet et Shnot HaShivim'' (Live) (2025)	

=== Compilations ===
Year	Album	Israel certificate
1989	Gvirotay Ve-Rabotay ("Ladies and Gentlemen")	2× platinum
1996	Ha'Osef Hasheni ("The Second Compilation")	
