= Boom Pam =

Middle Eastern rock band from Israel

Boom Pam בום פם
- Origin: Tel Aviv, Israel
- Genres: Mediterranean music, Balkan music, surf rock, instrumental rock
- Years active: 2003–
- Label: Essay Recordings
- Members: Uri Brauner Kinrot; Yuval "Tuby" Zolotov; Dani Ever Hadani; Ira Raviv
- Past members: Uzi Feinerman; Dudu Kochav; Itamar "The Kid" Levi
- Website: www.boompam.org

Boom Pam (Hebrew: בום פם) is a Middle Eastern rock band from Tel Aviv, Israel.

Founded in 2003, Boom Pam took its name from Aris San's song of the same name, and plays a mixture of Turkish, Balkan & Mediterranean rock and surf music in a format of a quartet consisting of electric guitar, tuba, keyboard and drums. Boom Pam served as the opening act for the reunion show of the well-known Israeli indie rock band Minimal Compact, as well as Emir Kusturica's No Smoking Orchestra. That, along with a showcase at WOMEX 2006, launched their worldwide touring career.

== Background ==
The original format of the band as a trio started at the high-school period in Telma Yellin High School of the Arts of three members: Uri Kinrot, Uzi Feinerman and Yuval Zolotov. The three played with the idea of forming a band combining all their influences: Yuval used to play in a classical orchestra whereas Uri and Uzi played in rock and jazz bands.

A long time after graduating from school, Uzi and Uri shared an apartment in south Tel Aviv. The area, which is well known for its mixed cultures and music genres, especially Turkish and Middle Eastern, influenced the two to combine elements from their jazz and rock bases. They started to explore this idea by jamming meetings along with Yuval on the tuba. In 2002, the band was formed as a trio with Kinrot and Feinerman on the electric guitars and Zolotov on the tuba and the bass drum. Kinrot named the band as a tribute to Aris San's big hit, "Boom Pam".

== Band Highlights ==
Boom Pam's debut album was recorded in Frankfurt for the German label Essay Recordings. The band co-produced the album with DJ Shantel. This LP was released during the spring of 2006 and was distributed worldwide. The album went into the top ten list of the European World Music charts. Their second album, Puerto Rican Nights, was released in 2008. Their debut show in North America was at GlobalFest 2007. They toured throughout USA and Canada, opening for The Ventures in California and playing at the Winnipeg Folk Festival and the Montreal International Jazz Festival. Boom Pam's third album was recorded in late 2009 and was released in 2010 by the Tel Aviv-based label Audio Montage. Following the album release, they made promotional appearances at SXSW.

Boom Pam have also been actively involved in various projects. They worked with the Batsheva Dance Company, released several Israeli hit singles, recorded film music, collaborated with Balkan Beat Box and Kutiman, and played a concert with the Israel Philharmonic Orchestra. In 2014 Boom Pam participated in the music project Boiler Room.

In spring 2015 Boom Pam was chosen to play in the annual music festival Lollapalooza in Buenos Aires, Argentina.

== Boom Pam and Selda Bağcan ==
In 2013 Boom Pam collaborated with the legendary Turkish artist Selda Bağcan. The band visited Istanbul for a series of rehearsals which eventually led to a special show in front of 10,000 people in “Groove Festival”.

The collaboration between two artists was based upon music and the political situation of both projects. Boom Pam was inspired by the psychedelic Middle Eastern sounds of Selda, and especially by the politically fueled lyrics. Boom Pam flew to Turkey to seek out their mentor for a collaboration. The common Middle Eastern roots between Selda and Boom Pam allowed for a musical relationship to flourish. The generational gap between the young quartet and the Turkish legend was bridged by their natural and instant connection through the power of music.

== Boom Pam in Japan ==
In 2012 Boom Pam arrived in Japan for the first time as part of the 60th anniversary of diplomatic relations between Japan and Israel for a series of live shows in Tokyo. After receiving great reviews among the Japanese audience, the band returned to Japan in 2014 for a big tour in Tokyo and several other cities, including a special performance at the famous Fuji Rock Festival.

In summer 2015, Boom Pam returned to Japan for the third time. This time, in addition to the band's well-known repertoire, Boom Pam collaborated with the Shibuya-Kei Japanese singer Mayumi Kojima. Together they toured Japan and recorded an album that was released in the same year.

== Discography ==
- Boom Pam (2005)
- Puerto Rican Nights (2008)
- Alakazam (2010)
- Manara and Summer Singles (2013)
- Boom Pam and Trifonas 7" (2015)
- Royal (2023)
