= Banai family =

Family of Israeli entertainers

The Banai family (Hebrew: משפחת בנאי) is an Israeli family of Iranian Jews known for a number of notable persons working in cinema, theater, music, and other kinds of entertainment.

== History ==
The family of Rahamim Banai (Bana) emigrated from Shiraz, in 1880, to escape famine and diseases plaguing southwestern Persia at these times. The family was already among prominent musicians.

Meir Eliyahu
Yaakov	Yossi	Yitzhak	Chaim	Gavri
Ehud	Yuval	Orly	Meir	Orna	Eviatar	Uri	Boaz
Elisha	Noam	Amir
