= Shlomi Bracha =

Israeli musical artist

Shlomi Bracha שלומי ברכה
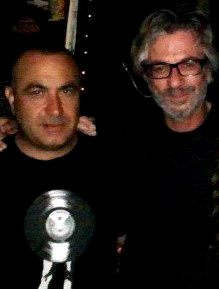
- Shlomi Bracha (left) and Yuval Banai

Background information
- Born: Shlomo Bracha; March 21, 1962 (age 64); Tel-Aviv, Israel
- Origin: Israel
- Genres: Pop rock; new wave; ska; alternative rock; hard rock
- Years active: 1985–present
- Label: Hed Arzi

Shlomi Bracha (Hebrew: שלומי ברכה; born 21 March 1962) is an Israeli musician and record producer, best known for being the guitarist and one of the songwriters in the Israeli pop rock band Mashina.

== Biography ==
Bracha was born on March 21, 1962, in Kiryat Shalom, Tel Aviv, Israel. He met Yuval Banai in 1980 while they were serving together in the Israel Defense Forces, and they formed a band. They split up after their army service, and Bracha formed the group HaChazit Ha'amamit ("The National Front") with bassist Michael Benson. In 1984 Bracha teamed up again with Banai and with the drummer Iggy Dayan to form the band Mashina. Their self-titled debut album was released in 1985. Later Avner Hodorov joined the band on keyboard and saxophone.

In May 1995 the group disbanded after a series of four farewell shows. Bracha began co-writing with Rami Fortis, and they released an album a few years later. He released a solo album, Chaplin Charlie, in 2003, the same year that Mashina got back together and resumed recording and performing.

Aside from his musical career, Shlomi Bracha served as a coach and mentor (alongside his Mashina bandmate Yuval Banai) on the television show The Voice Israel in the second season.

== Discography ==
- "Ratz Al Ha'Ketza" (Running on the Edge) with Rami Fortis (1998)
- "Chaplin Charlie" (2003)
- For Mashina's complete discography see Mashina
