= Eviatar Banai =

Israeli musician, singer and songwriter

Eviatar Banai אביתר בנאי
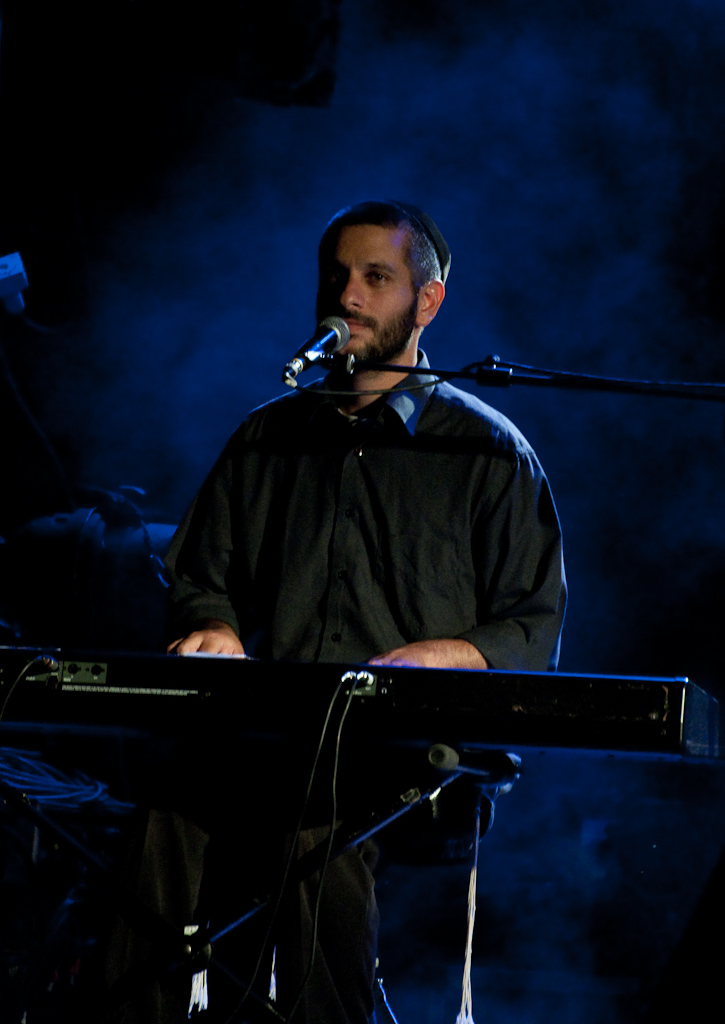

Background information
- Born: February 8, 1973 (age 53)
- Origin: Beersheba, Israel
- Genres: Art rock, chamber pop, baroque pop, progressive, electronica
- Occupations: Singer-songwriter, musician
- Instruments: Vocals, guitar, piano
- Years active: 1997–present
- Label: Hed Arzi Music
- Website: eviatarbanai.com

Eviatar Banai (also spelled Evyatar or (incorrectly) Evitar; Hebrew: אביתר בנאי; born February 8, 1973) is an Israeli musician, singer and songwriter.

== Biography ==
=== Early life ===
Banai was born in 1973 in Beersheba. The extended Banai family is notable as an outstanding family of Israeli artists; Eviatar is the younger brother of actress Orna Banai and singer and songwriter Meir Banai. The family chose a musical-artistic path although their father, Yitzhak Banai, was a judge.

Banai studied cinema in high school. He also studied piano for eight years. While serving in the Israel Defense Forces, he directed and wrote the screenplay and music for a comedy film called Six that was shown on Israel's Channel 1.

=== Career ===
After his military service in the IDF, Banai lived and worked in a kibbutz in the Golan Heights. There he wrote a play, which he hoped to stage in Tel Aviv. He moved to Tel Aviv to do that, and although the play was never staged, he stayed to live there and started writing songs. He played intimate concerts in small clubs in Tel Aviv and after some time the music producer Chaim Shemesh, who worked at Hed Arzi Music, proposed that he record an album.

The songs on the album were produced and arranged by Israeli singer-songwriter Corinne Allal. Most of the album was based on Banai's unique melodic singing voice accompanied by a piano, some songs had strings arrangements and a few had simpler rock guitar-and-drums arrangements. The eponymous debut album was released in 1997 and the combination of traditionalist chamber pop sound with modern sounds, emotional lyrics and intricate melodies was well-received: The reviews were uniformly positive, many songs became major radio hits and the album sold over 50,000 copies.

Overwhelmed by the success of the album, Banai, like many young Israelis, traveled to India to overcome it. Upon his return to Israel he settled in the desert town of Mitzpe Ramon, where he started working on his second album, Shir Tiyul (שיר טיול, Trip Song). The album was released in 1999. Its style was completely different – it had very little of the piano sound that characterized the first album and was mostly based on experimental electronic music. The reviews praised Banai's boldness and innovation, but sales were poor and Banai retreated from public attention.

In 2004 Banai, like his cousin Ehud Banai, returned to his Jewish religious roots and became a baal teshuva. He moved back to Tel Aviv, married, and had a son.

On Purim day of 5765 (2005) he released his new album `Omed Al Neyar (עומד על נייר, Standing on Paper), produced by Gil Smetana. Most of the music was written by Banai. One song was an adaptation of a poem by Rachel, some others were contributed by Etgar Keret, Amir Lev and Gilad Kahana and rest were written by Banai. The music on the album was again a departure from his earlier albums – it was mostly played by a basic rock band of guitar, bass and drums. The album received critical praise, produced several radio hits and returned Banai to the public attention. It was certified gold in November of the same year.

Banai released his fourth album Layla Kayom Yair (לילה כיום יאיר, The Night will be as Bright as the Day; taken from Psalms 139:12) on November 22, 2009. It was similar in musical style to `Omed Al Neyar, while the lyrics showed Banai's deeper involvement with Judaism. The albums were produced by Amir Tzoref. The jazz musician Daniel Zamir contributed saxophone to three songs and Eviatar's father Yitzhak Banai sang on one song. In August 2013 he released his fifth album, called "Yafa Kalevana" (יפה כלבנה, pretty as the Moon). The second single succeeded well in the charts and on the radio.

In October 2018, Education Minister Naftali Bennett announced that Banai would receive the Lifetime Achievement Award for Jewish-Israeli culture.

In 2024, Banai unexpectedly released the album Shichot Shalom (“Peace Talks”), produced by Tamir Muskat and shaped by the backdrop of the Iron Swords War. For example, the song “Chalal” (“Fallen”) traces Banai’s emotional journey between hospital beds of the wounded and funerals of the fallen. Alongside the national trauma, he delves into deeply personal themes such as his experiences in a support group for recovering addicts, a midlife crisis, his relationship, and his mother’s aging. He also wrote the song “Yehonatan” as a tribute to Yehonatan Geffen and other artistic influences he grew up on, including Shalom Hanoch, Meir Ariel, and Yehudit Ravitz.

== Personal life ==
Banai is married to Ruth, father of four sons and a daughter, and resides in the Ramot neighborhood of Jerusalem. He gave a weekly lesson about Mesilat Yesharim as part of an evening program at Ish Kodesh Yeshiva (a branch of the Ramat Gan Yeshiva).

== Discography ==
=== Studio albums ===
- 1997: Eviatar Banai
- 1999: Shir Tiyul (Trip Song)
- 2005: Omed Al Neyar (Standing on Paper)
- 2009: Layla Kayom Yair (Night as the Day Does Shine)
- 2013: Yafa Kalevana (Pretty as the Moon)
- 2017: Leshonot Shel Esh (Tongues of Fire)
- 2021: HaChayim Matchilim L'Nagen (Life Begins to Play)
- 2024: Sichot Shalom (Peace Talks)

=== Live albums ===
- 2022: Live at TEDER
- 2023: Be-Chazara La-Album Ha-Rishon (Live)
- 2025: Sichot Shalom (Live Be-Barby)
