= Chaim Banai =

Israeli actor (1937–2008)

- חיים בנאי
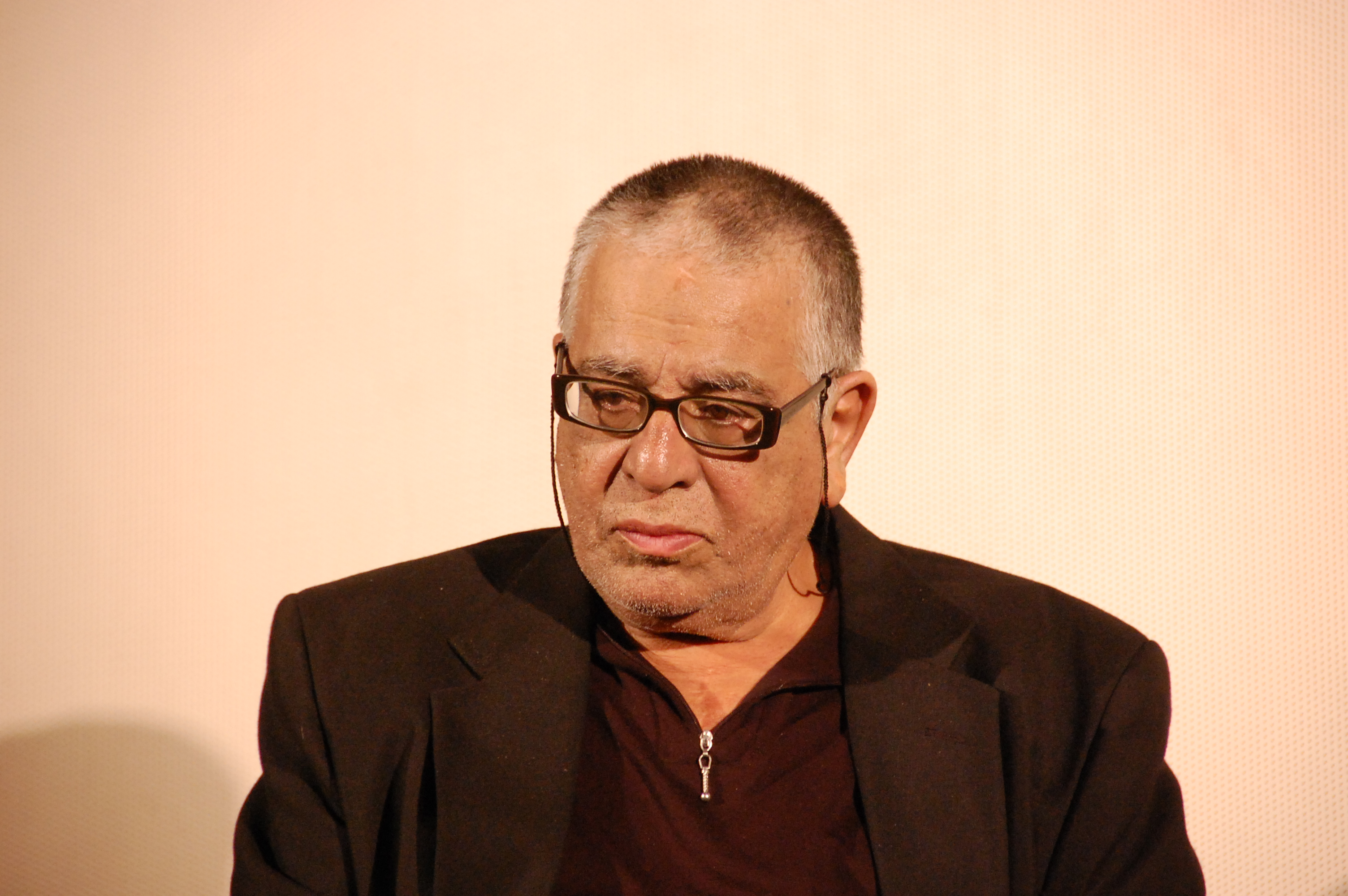
- Banai in 2008
- Born: 14 May 1937; Jerusalem, Mandatory Palestine
- Died: 10 August 2008 (aged 71); Jerusalem, Israel
- Other names: Haim Banai
- Occupations: Actor; comedian; radio presenter; storyteller
- Years active: 1966–2008
- Children: 4
- Relatives: Banai family

Chaim Banai (Hebrew: חיים בנאי; 14 May 1937 – 10 August 2008) was an Israeli actor.
