= Orna Banai =

Israeli actress

- אורנה בנאי
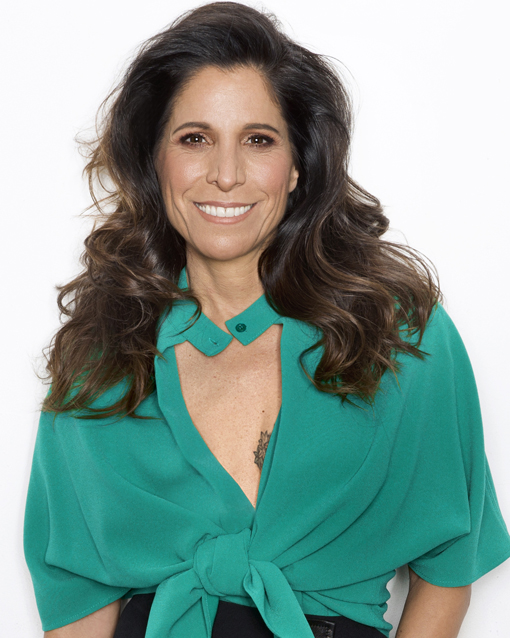
- Born: 25 November 1966 (age 59); Beersheba, Israel
- Occupations: Actress; comedian; television personality; politician
- Years active: 1990–present
- Children: 2, including Amir Banai
- Relatives: Banai family

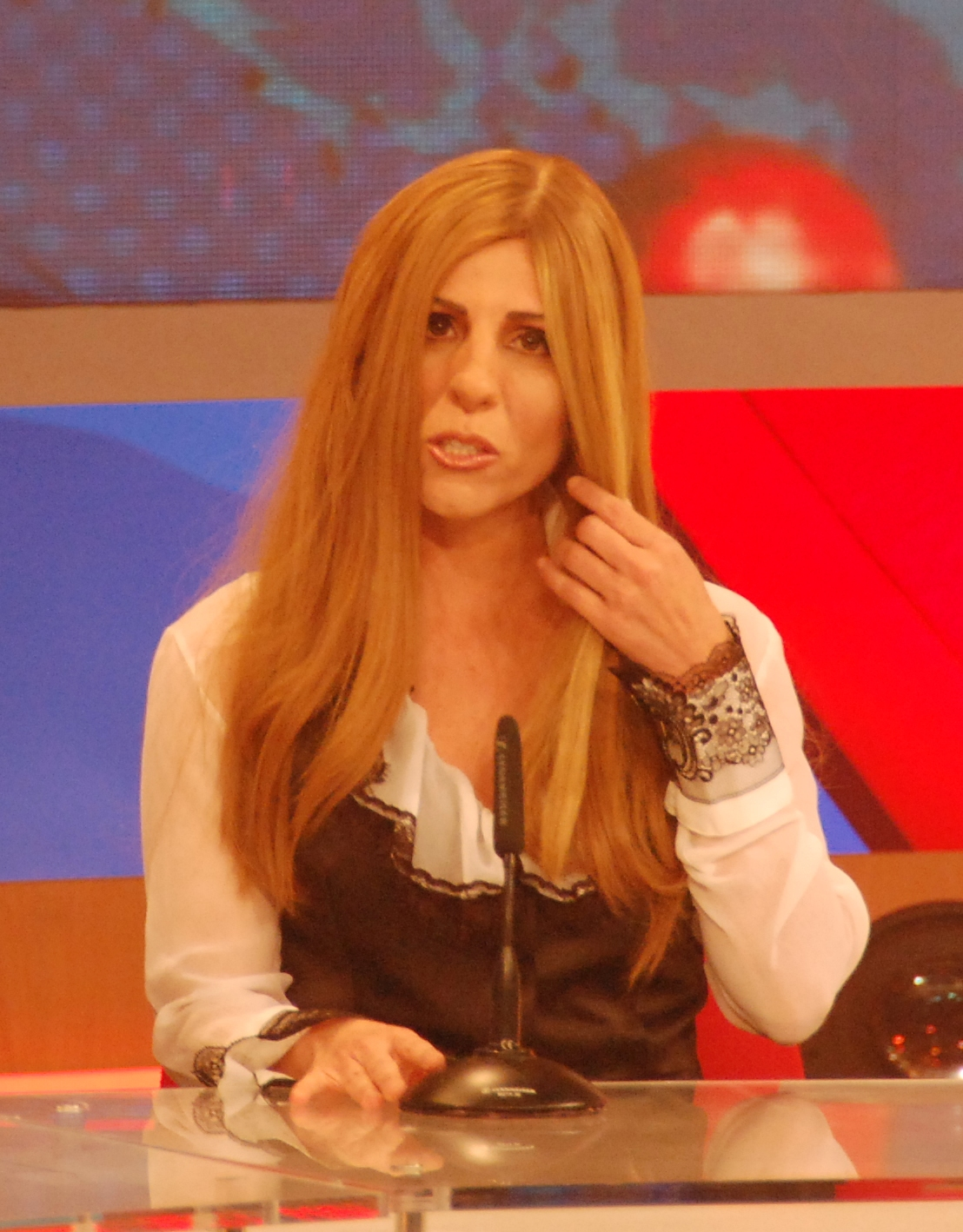
Banai in 2009

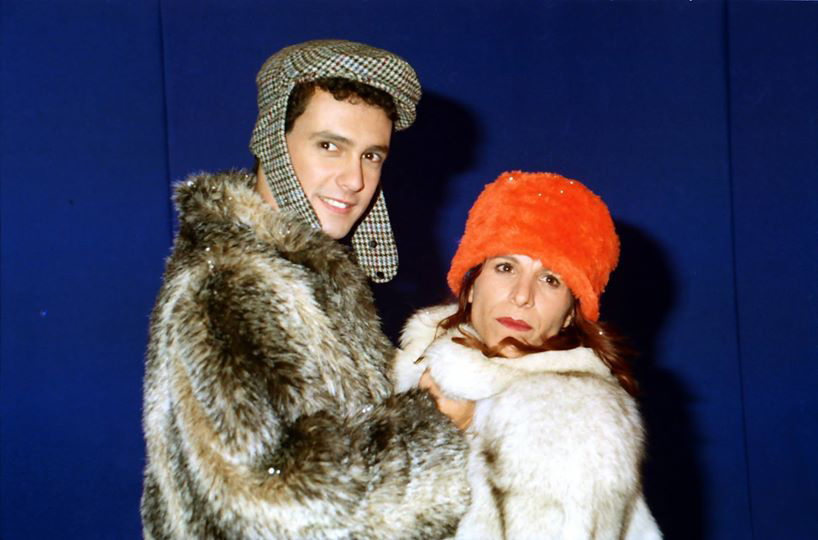
Oded Menashe and Orna Banai.

Orna Banai (Hebrew: אורנה בנאי; born 25 November 1966) is an Israeli actress, stand-up comedian and politician who won the 2006 Israeli Television Academy Award, and was a past member of the Tel Aviv-Yafo city Council. Many of her relatives are successful Israeli actors and singers. The next generation of the Banai family, including Orna and her brothers, Meir and Eviatar, followed this tradition.

== Biography ==
Banai was born in Beersheba and raised in Omer. Her father was a District Court judge in Beersheba, and her mother was a grammar teacher and school principal of the comprehensive "Vav" school in Beersheba. She studied at comprehensive "Vav" urban high school in Be'er Sheva majoring in theatre. She did her military service as a coordinator at the High School for Children and Youth near Yeruham. After her military service, she began to study acting at the "Nissan Nativ Acting Studio" in Tel Aviv. In the last year of her studies, she acted in the play "Youth of Varda'la" by Hanoch Levin, in the production of the studio, directed by Yuval Zamir. After three years of studying acting in Nissan Nativ's studio in Tel Aviv, Banai started performing in stand-up comedy and entertainment shows.

Banai became known for her portraying "Limor" in the humorous Israeli television shows Action and Rak BeIsrael (with Erez Tal). Since 2003, Banai has appeared in the popular satirical television show Eretz Nehederet. In addition, Banai acted in television dramas like Merchav-Yarkon and Max VeMoris. Banai also appeared in theatrical plays like Singles and The Last Striptease.

She served as a member of the Tel Aviv-Yafo City Council on behalf of the Green Party from 2003 to 2008.

In 2005, Banai played "Efrat" in the television show Ima'lle, to which she contributed writing. The show was based on the story of Banai's own pregnancy and the birth of her son, Amir Banai, now an actor.

She describes her views on the Arab–Israeli conflict as left-wing.

In 2019, Banai joined the 3rd season of Metumtemet.

== Personal life ==
Banai is the sister of singers Meir Banai and Eviatar Banai.

In 2003 she had a son named Amir. In 2008, she revealed in an interview with the newspaper Yedioth Tel Aviv that the father of the child is the journalist Aharon Barnea, who did not respond to the news.

In 2008, while in a relationship with a partner named Karin, Banai adopted her second daughter, Mika.

On December 27, 2011 Banai came out of the closet as a lesbian. In July 2017 she started a relationship with the actress and screenwriter Bat Chen Sabag, and in May 2019 it was published that they had broken up. Afterwards, she was in a relationship for about six months with the chef Shiral Berger. Since 2021 Banai has been in a relationship with Adi Cohen.

Banai resides in Tel Aviv.
