= Ehud Banai =

Israeli singer and songwriter

Ehud Banai אהוד בנאי
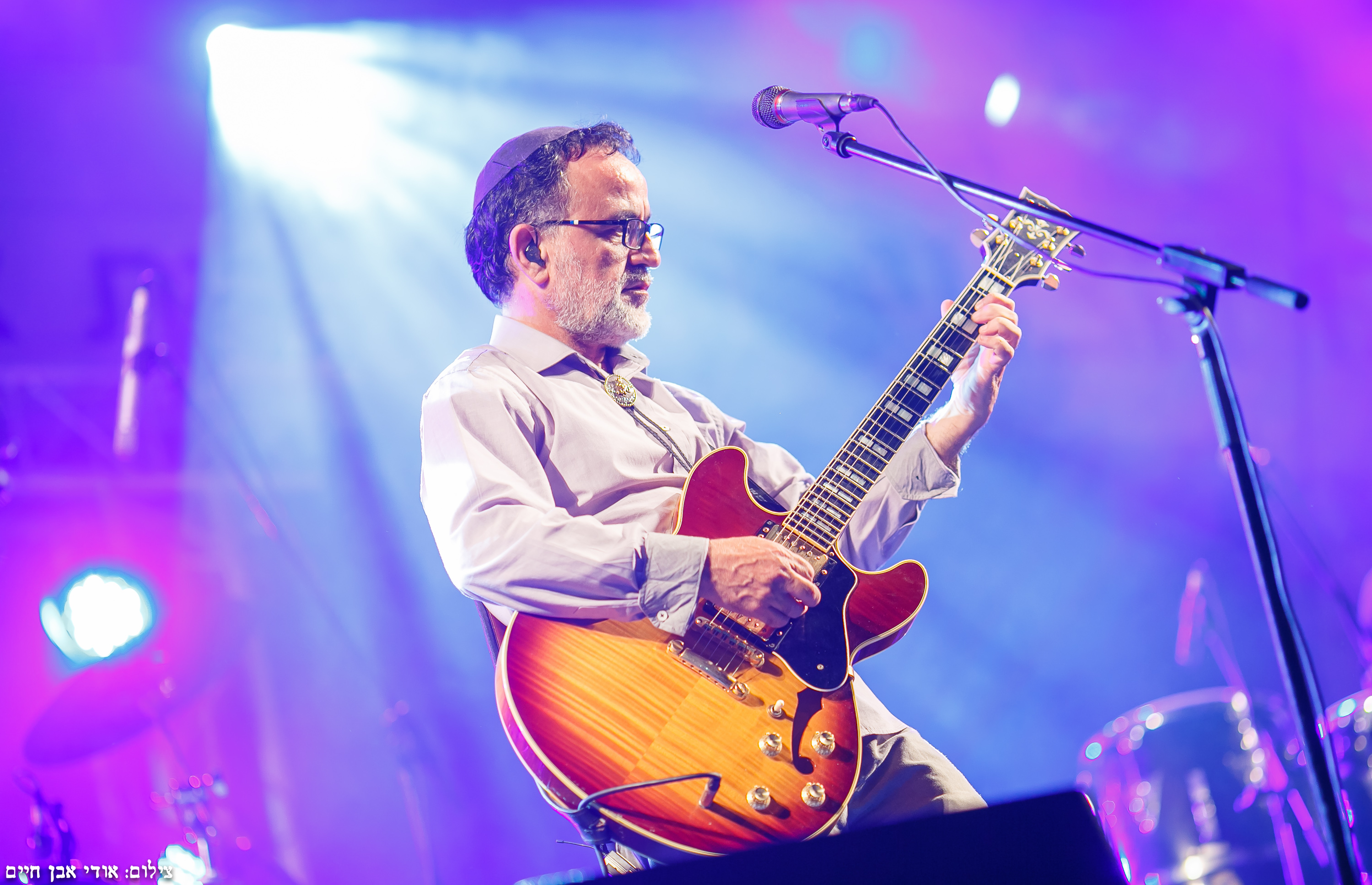
- Ehud Banai performing in a live concert.

Background information
- Born: March 31, 1953 (age 73); Jerusalem, Israel.
- Origin: Jerusalem, Israel
- Genres: Rock, folk, folk rock, Israeli folk, Israeli rock, Israeli folk-rock
- Occupations: Musician, songwriter, author, radio broadcaster
- Instruments: Vocals, Guitar, Harmonica
- Years active: 1977–present
- Labels: CBS, NMC
- Website: www.ehudbanai.co.il

Ehud Banai (Hebrew: אהוד בנאי; born 31 March 1953) is an Israeli musician, songwriter, author, and a member of the prominent Banai family in Israel.

== Early life ==
Ehud Banai was born in Jerusalem to the Iranian Jewish Banai family. His father was the actor Yaakov Banai. The family moved to Givatayim when Banai was four. At the age of ten, he learned to play the cello. In 1971 he was drafted to the Israel Defense Forces and served in the Nahal infantry brigade. After his discharge, he moved to London, where he busked in the London Underground for six months.

== Music career ==
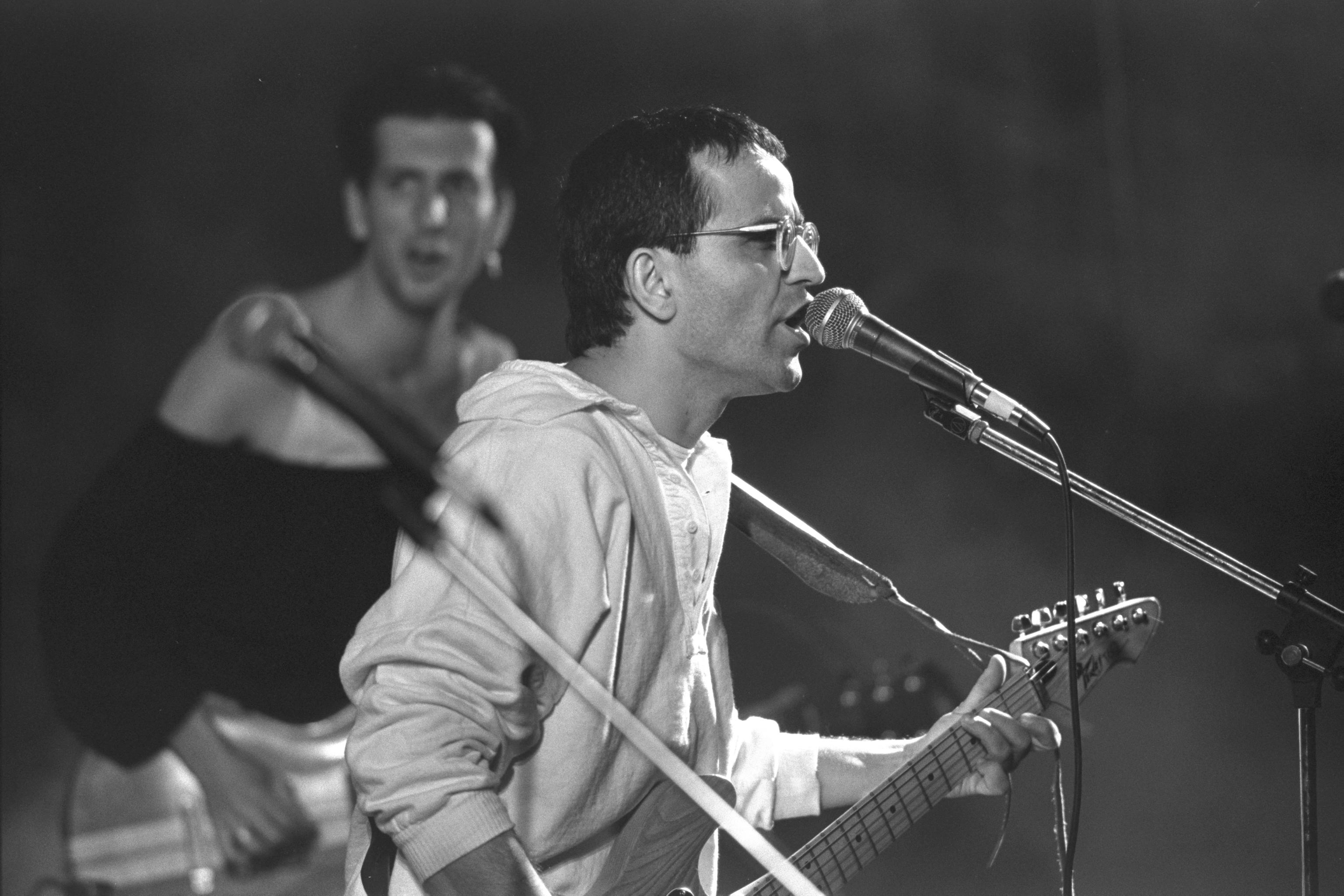
Ehud Banai at Neve Shalom Rally for Peace

In 1982, Banai formed a band with singer Avi Matos. He made several other attempts at a breakthrough during the following years. He auditioned for Shlomo Bar's band, Habreira Hativ'it, but wasn't accepted. In 1986, Ehud and his band Haplitim ("The Refugees") broke through, with the hit single Ir Miklat (City of Refuge) and the rock opera "Mami".

In 1987, Banai and the Refugees released their self-titled debut, which is considered by many to be one of the best and most important albums of Israeli rock, with original mix of new wave guitar rock with some oriental rhythms and sounds. Most of the album consisted of protest songs. The songs also included many Biblical subjects and allusions, such as the golden calf and cities of refuge.

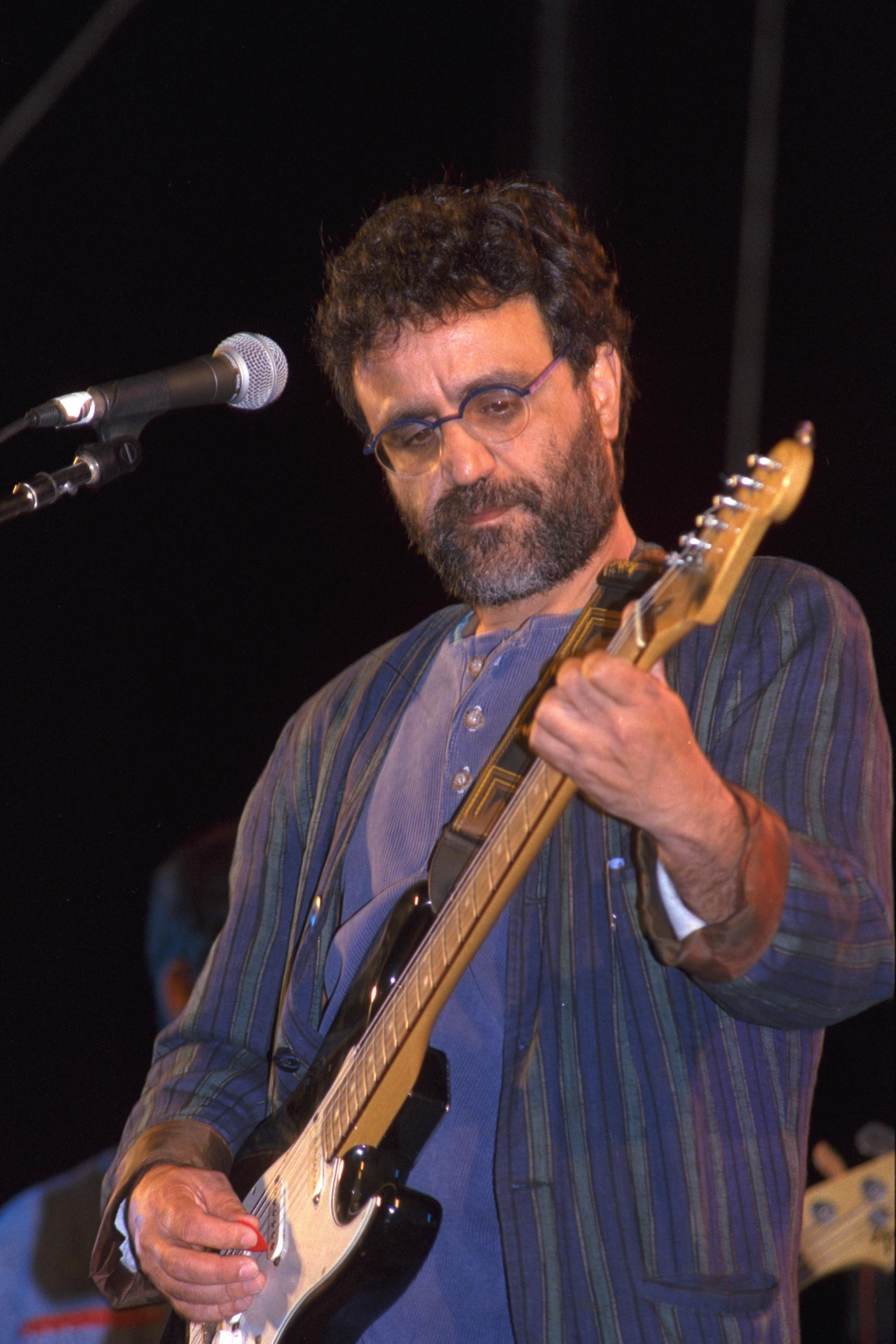
Ehud Banai, 1997

Their follow-up, Karov ("Near"), released in 1989, had influences ranging from Banai's early childhood in Jerusalem, traveling in Europe, Bob Dylan, the Banai family's Afghan/Persian-Jewish background, to Jewish prayer and piyutim, among others. He also released "Under the Jasmine Tree", an album of Persian folk tales as told by his father.

During the 1990s, Banai released three albums (The Third was released in 1992, In a Little While in 1996, and Tip Tipa in 1998). Ane' Li was released in 2004. The song "Blues Kna'ani" (Canaanite Blues) was written in memory of Meir Ariel, and "Hayom" (Today) was written for Banai's wife.

Banai sang a duet with David D'Or on D'Or's album Kmo HaRuach ("Like the Wind"), which was released on March 27, 2006.

A triple live album, Mamshich Linso'a ("Keeps On Moving"), was released in October 2006.

Banai writes the lyrics and composes the music for almost all of his own songs. For the greater part of his musical career, he has observed Jewish traditions, and essentially “returned” to Orthodox Jewish religious observance over the course of the early 2000s. Banai habitually scatters references to his connection to Jewish subjects throughout many of his songs.

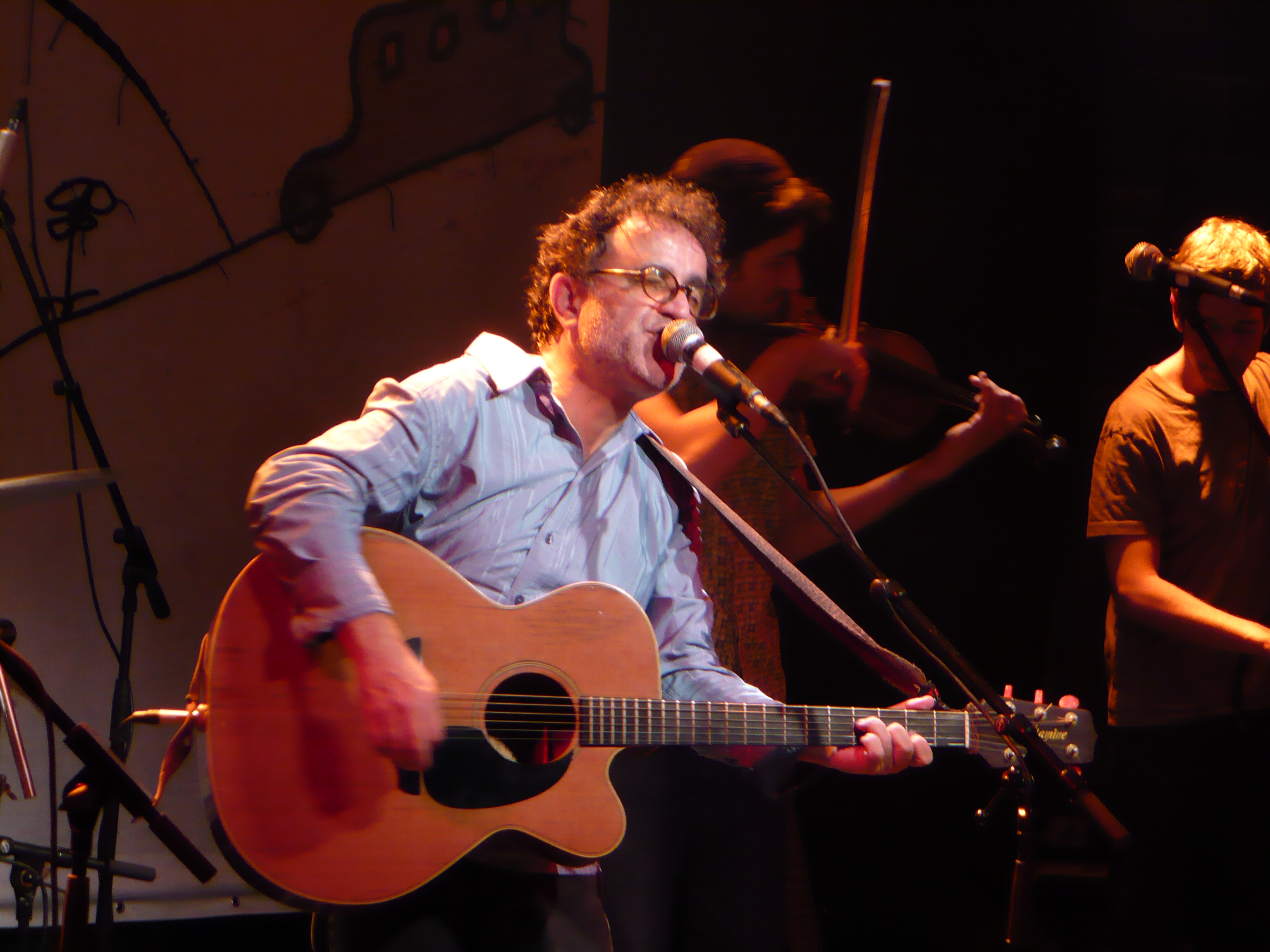
Ehud Banai performing, 2008

In 2008, "On the Move", a documentary film directed by Avida Livny and produced by Gidi Avivi, Yael Biron and Dror Nahum, about Banai and the Refugees, participated in the official competition of the Jerusalem Film Festival, in EPOS -the international art & culture film festival in Israel and has been screened in cinemateques around Israel. The film traces Banai's early years on the music scene, through the struggle, musical passion, and deeply rooted friendship he shared with members of his first band, "The Refugees" – Yossi Elephant, Jean Jacques Goldeberg, Noam Halevi, and Gil Smetana.

In September 2008, Banai released Shir Chadash, an album of traditional Jewish songs (zemirot), including several melodies composed by Shlomo Carlebach.

Banai's album Resisei Laila ("Shards of the Night") was released in 2011.

== Partial discography ==
- Ehud Banai and the Refugees (1987)
- Mitachat Siach HaYasmin (Under the Jasmine Tree), with Yaakov Banai (1989)
- Karov ("Close") (1989)
- Hashlishi ("The Third) (1992)
- Od Me'at ("Soon") (1996)
- Tip Tipa (1998)
- Ane Li ("Answer Me") (2004)
- Mamshich Linsoa (Keeps on Driving) (2006)
- Shir Chadash (New Song) (2008)
- Resisei Laila (Shards of Night) (2011)
- Beofek Acher (2012)
- EB=MC2 (2017), with Michael Chapman

== Published works ==
- Remembering Almost Everything (Keter 2001)
- Ze HaMakom

== See also ==
- Music of Israel
