= Mahane Yehuda Market =

Marketplace in Jerusalem

- Shuk Mahane Yehuda
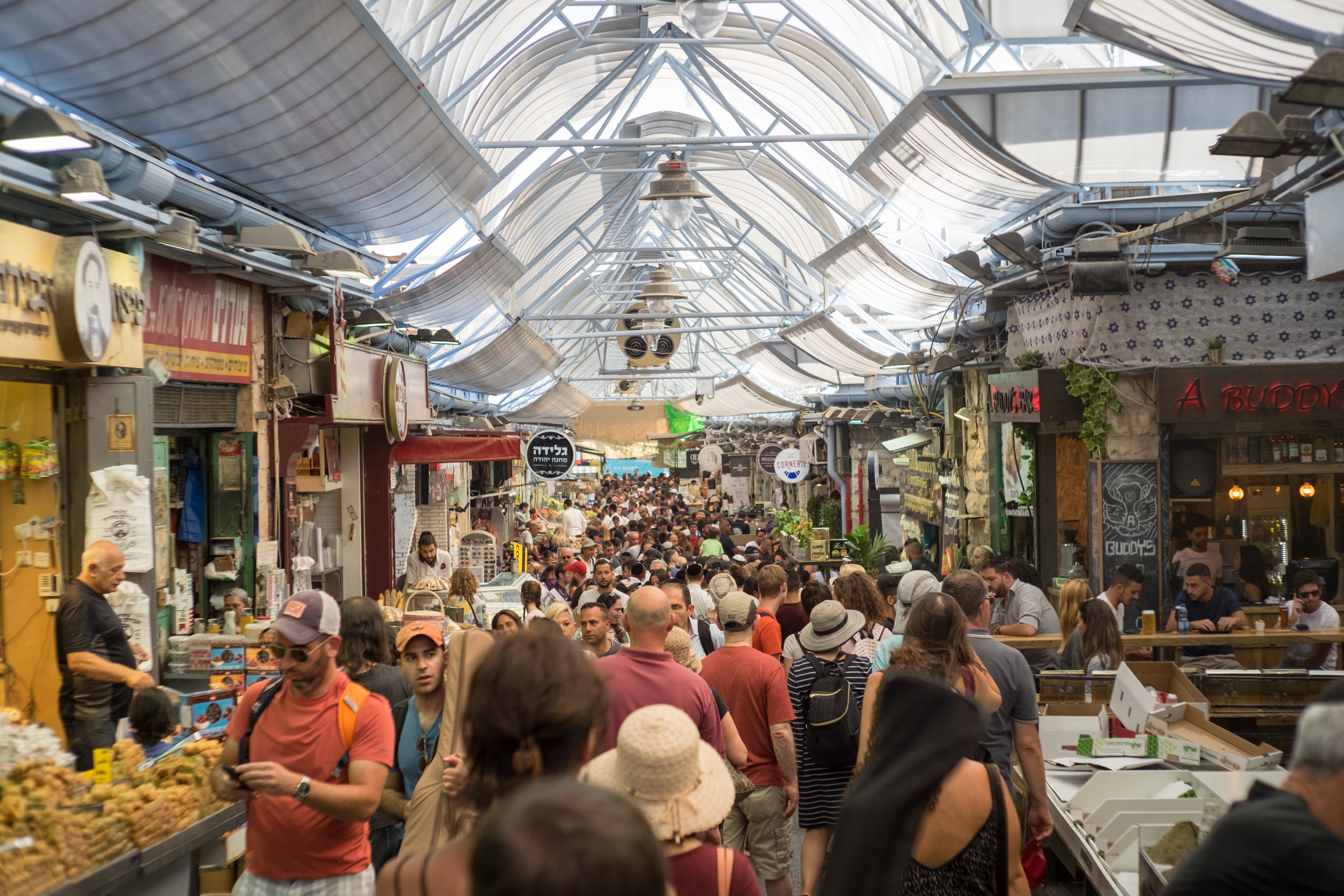
- Mahane Yehuda Market on a busy Friday

- Location within Jerusalem
- Alternative names: The Shuk or Machne

General information
- Location: Jerusalem
- Coordinates: 31°47′08″N 35°12′44″E
- Opened: Late 19th century
- Operator: Machane Yehuda Management

Mahane Yehuda Market (Hebrew: שוק מחנה יהודה, romanized: Shuk Mahane Yehuda; Arabic: سوق محاني يهودا), often referred to as "The Shuk" (Hebrew: השוק, romanized: HaShuq, lit. 'The Market'), is a marketplace (originally open-air, but now partially covered) in Jerusalem. Popular with locals and tourists alike, the market's more than 250 vendors sell fresh fruits and vegetables; baked goods; fish, meat and cheeses; nuts, seeds, and spices; wines and liquors; clothing and shoes; and housewares, textiles, and Judaica.

In and around the market are falafel, shawarma, kibbeh, kebab, shashlik, kanafeh, baklava, halva, zalabiya and Jerusalem mixed grill stands, juice bars, cafes, and restaurants. The color and bustle of the marketplace is accentuated by vendors who call out their prices to passersby. On Thursdays and Fridays, the marketplace is filled with shoppers stocking up for Shabbat, until the Friday afternoon sounding of the bugle that signifies the market will close for the Sabbath. In recent years, "the shuk" has emerged as another Jerusalemic nightlife center, with restaurants, bars and live music.

== Geography ==
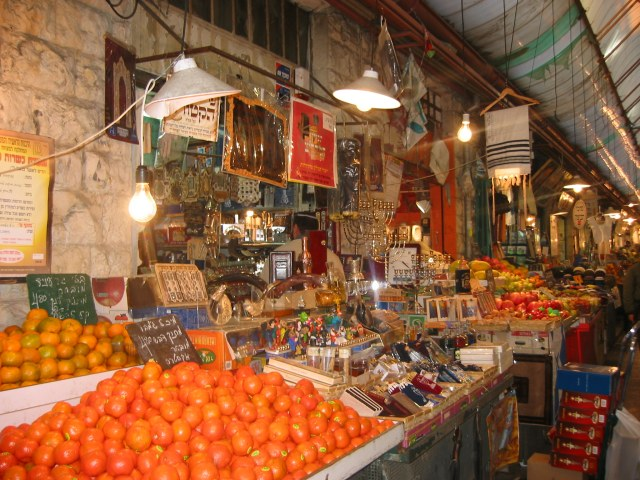
Jaffa oranges and Judaica at Mahane Yehuda.

Mahane Yehuda market is bounded by Jaffa Road to the north, Agrippas Street to the south, Beit Yaakov Street to the west, and Kiach Street to the east. The market itself has two major streets: Eitz Chaim Street (the covered market) and Mahane Yehuda Street (the open-air market). Bisecting these two streets are smaller streets that all used to be named for fruits and nuts—Afarsek (Peach) Street, Agas (Pear) Street, Egoz (Walnut) Street, Shaked (Almond) Street, Shezif (Plum) Street, Tapuach (Apple) Street, and Tut (Strawberry) Street—until the municipality changed the name of Agas St. to Yaakov Eliyahu Banai St.

== History ==
In 1887 the neighborhood of Mahane Yehuda was established on the north side of Jaffa Road. It was founded by three business partners—Johannes Frutiger (a German Protestant and owner of the largest bank in Ottoman Palestine), Shalom Konstrum, and Joseph Navon—and was named after Navon's brother, Yehuda. On the south side of the street to the west stood another neighborhood, Beit Ya'akov, founded in 1885.

At the end of the 19th century, a marketplace was established on an empty lot to the east of Beit Ya'akov and across the road from Mahane Yehuda which was owned by the Sephardi Valero family; this market was known as Shuk Beit Yaakov (Beit Yaakov Market). Here Arab merchants and fellaheen sold their goods to the residents who lived outside the Old City. As the new neighborhoods outside the Old City grew, the Beit Yaakov Market grew apace with more stalls, tents and pavilions.

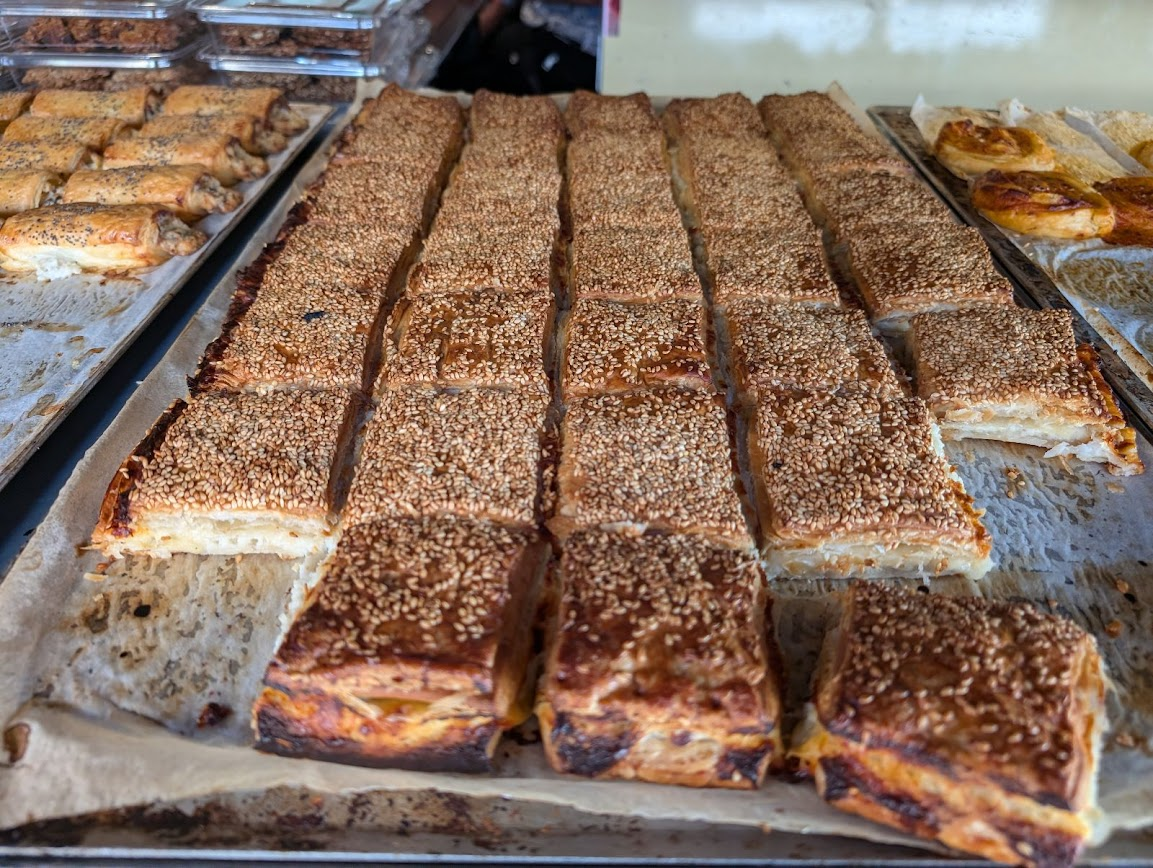
Various types of bourekas, a savory pastry of Sephardic origin, sold at the market

Under Ottoman rule, the market expanded haphazardly and sanitary conditions worsened. The Etz Chaim Yeshiva opened a few shops in the market, using the rent income to help fund the yeshiva. In the late 1920s, the British Mandate authorities cleared out all the merchants and built permanent stalls and roofing. Afterwards the market began to be known as the Mahane Yehuda Market, after the larger neighborhood.

In 1931 a new section was built to the west of the market by 20 traders, who previously had only temporary wooden stalls in the area. It was later named the Iraqi Market, as many traders of Iraqi Jewish descent acquired shops there. Today the Iraqi Market is located off Mahane Yehuda Street.

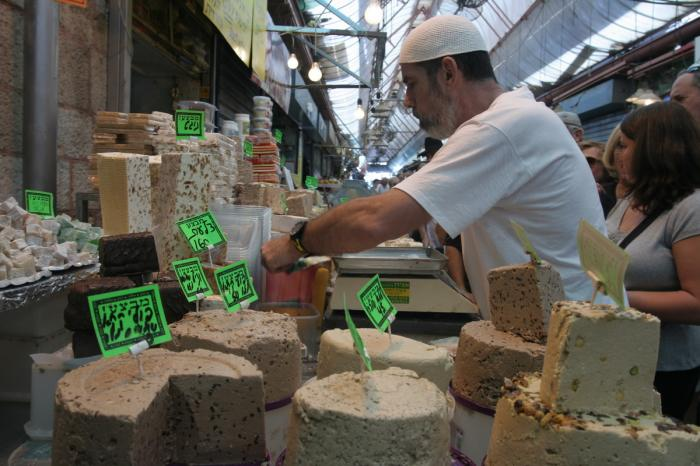
A halvah seller arranges his wares.

In the 2000s, major renovations were made to the Mahane Yehuda Market, including infrastructure work, repaving roads and covering some open areas. The market's Board of Directors worked to make at least some of these changes in response to a decrease in visitors after terrorist attacks in 1997 and 2002 killed 23 people. Changes driven by the Board included renovations to the streets and alleyways, but also included efforts to draw in cafes and boutiques that would entice more middle-class customers who might become frequent shoppers. According to Eli Mizrachi, chairman of the Mahane Yehuda Merchants Association, whereas shoppers used to come to buy produce, the "new generation" wants a place with entertainment, a place to sit and have a cup of coffee, and a place to shop for gifts.

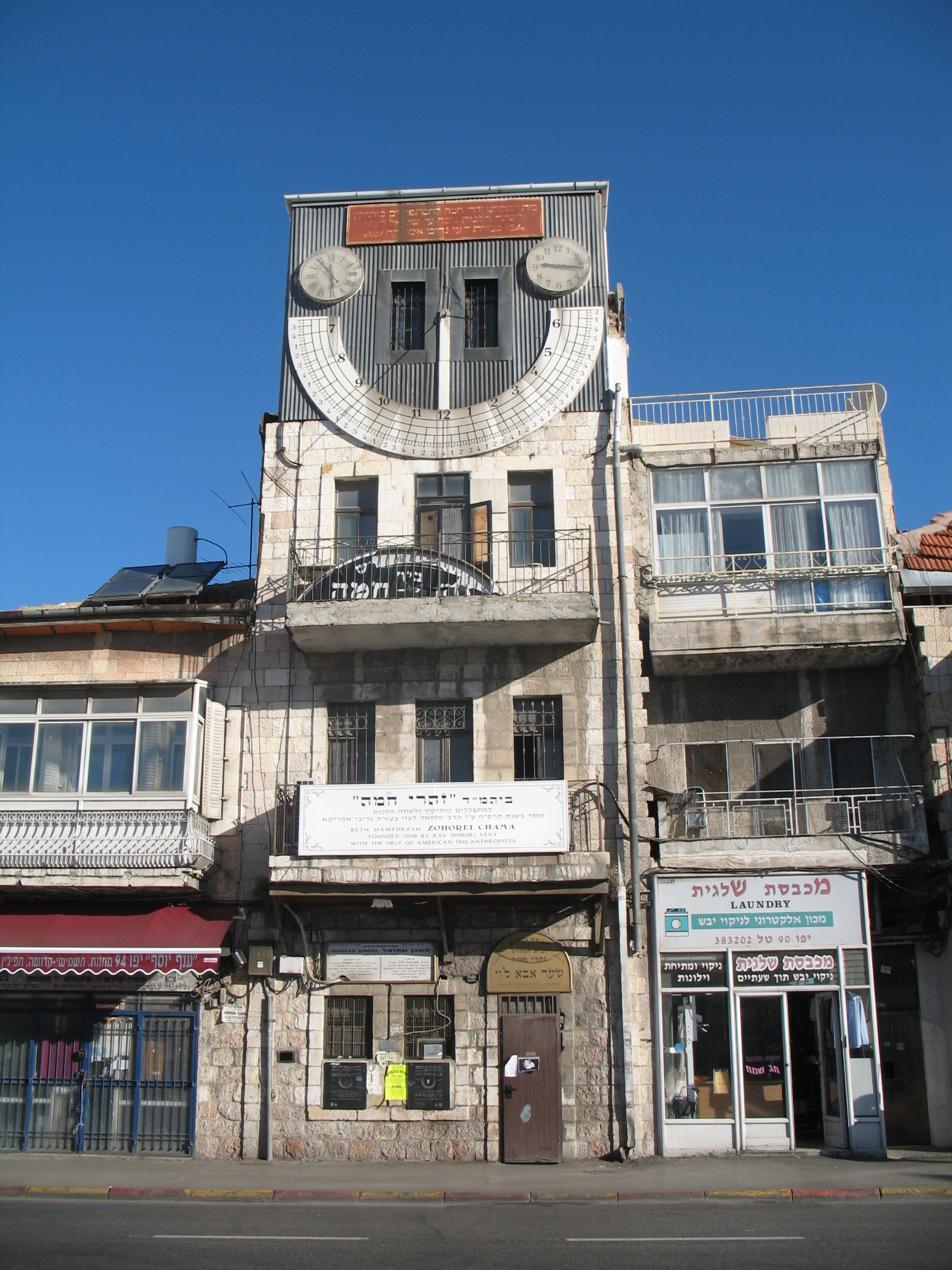
The front of the Zoharei Chama Synagogue, across from the Shuk. The sun clock pictured at the top of the building is the first clock in Jerusalem, erected with the synagogue building in 1909.

In the mid-2000s, Ethiopian food sellers began to appear in and around the market. In addition, a number of "trendy shops and cafés" began appearing among the market's retail stalls." New "non-Middle Eastern" restaurants include eateries such as "Pasta Basta," specializing in Italian pasta dishes, "Fish and Chips," described by one guide book as "the only fish and chips bar in Jerusalem," and "Ha'Agas 1," a vegetarian restaurant. Other recent additions to the market's stalls include an espresso bar, "hip jewelry" stores, and designer clothing "boutiques". Three new designer clothing stores opened in 2007 alone.

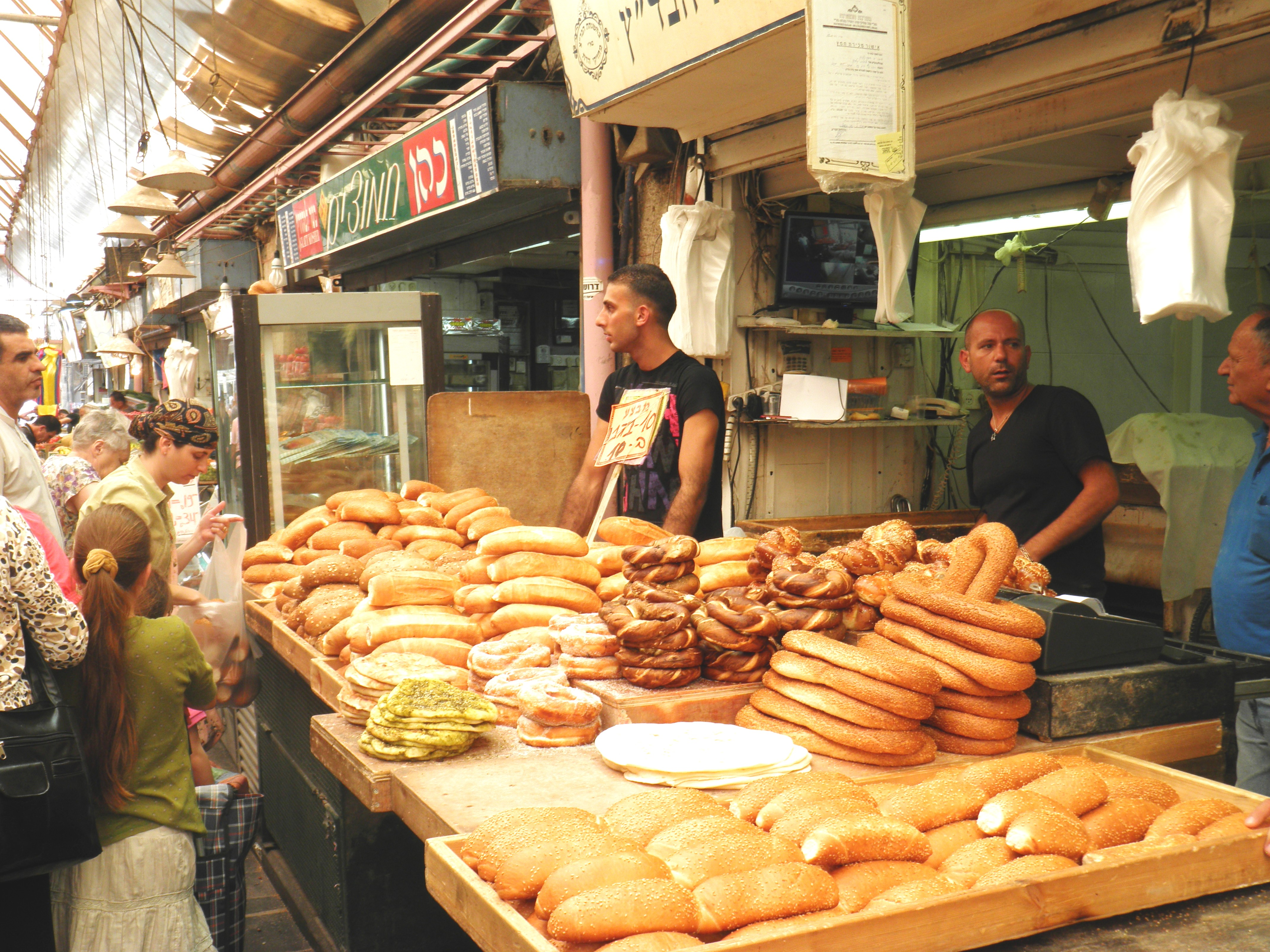
Bread and pita vendor.

Changes in the market have transformed the area into a "night spot," with bars featuring specialty drinks, live music, and singers. The change has been so pronounced that a Jerusalem Post article listed one shuk restaurant as one of the five highest-rated restaurants in the city for romantic dates. The shuk also now hosts special events like the "Balabasta" dance and music festival, launched in 2010, which attracts large crowds that remain until late at night, in areas that used to be deserted. The annual festival includes street performances, artwork, puppet shows, and events linked to the market's foods, such as chili-eating contests and produce-carving workshops.

While some supporters of changes to the market claim that the revitalized shuk has actually helped to revitalize the whole city, others are less enthusiastic about the changes, noting that real estate prices have quadrupled since the 2000s, forcing out many older shops (like vegetable and fish shops) that were staples of the market. They fear that the arrival of chain stores is "part of a global phenomenon that may erase local culture."

== Tourism ==
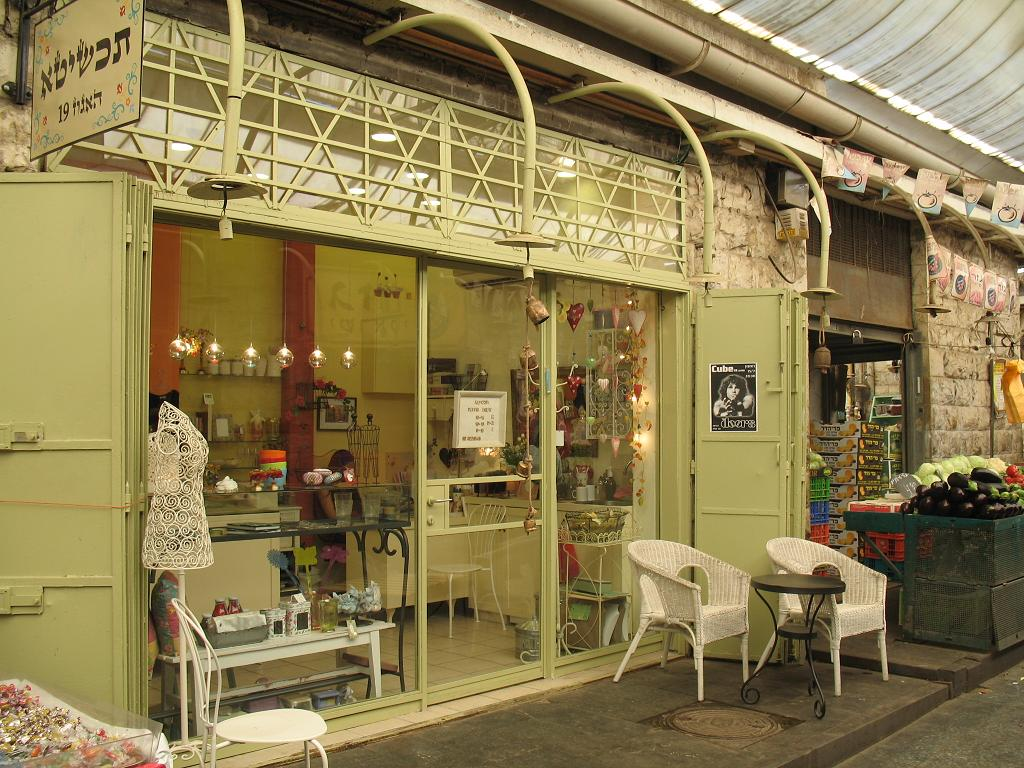
A boutique in the marketplace.

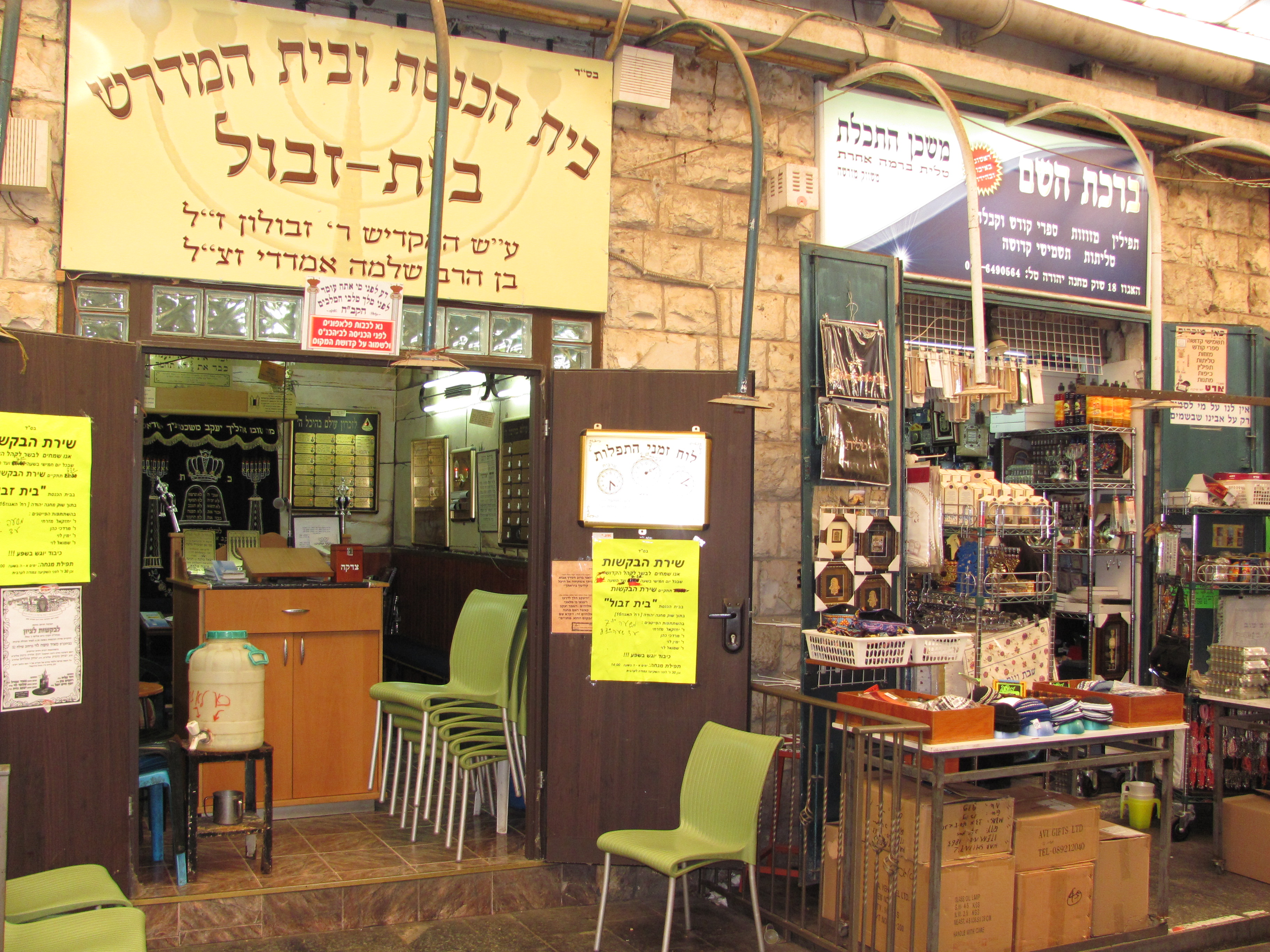
Beit Zvul, a storefront synagogue.

The Jerusalem Municipality has invested millions in modernizing the center of Jerusalem and creating many pedestrian malls in order to elevate commerce, tourism, and culture. Nir Barkat, former mayor of Jerusalem, said, "We realized if we wanted to increase our market share of tourism and the time people spend in Jerusalem, nightlife is key". In recent years, as part of this strategy, many bars and restaurants have opened in the alleyways of the Mahane Yehuda market to draw young and sophisticated customers. Free Wi-Fi internet access is now available to customers in some of the market's shops.

A self-guided tour of the market called "Shuk Bites" includes a map with a pre-planned route through the market and "punch-card" vouchers that allow visitors to sample a variety of foods and drinks.

Guided shopping and cooking tours are aimed at attracting a "new breed of culinary tourists."

=== Artwork ===
In 2011 the city-sponsored project "Tabula Rasa" (Blank Slate) supported urban artwork decorating walls, concrete surfaces, and even the trash bins of the market. Street artist Itamar Paloge, curator for the project, recruited some 30 other artists from schools of art and photography in the city, including Bezalel, Hadassah, and Musrara, in addition to local sculptors, painters, photographers, and various artists, including street artists. Jerusalem mayor at the time Nir Barkat noted that the project is a joint venture between the merchants, the Student Union, and the municipality. Barkat stressed that Mahane Yehuda has become more than a market: it is an important part of the city's public space – and it's a unique part because of the way Jews and Arabs bargain shop side-by-side in its crowded alleyways and streets.

Beginning in January 2015 the metal shutters and doors of the shops became an after-hours attraction as they were spray painted by street artist Solomon Souza. Souza's partner in the project, Berel Hahn, arranged permission from the shopkeepers. As of July 2016, Souza had spray-painted more than 250 of the 360 shutters in the market.

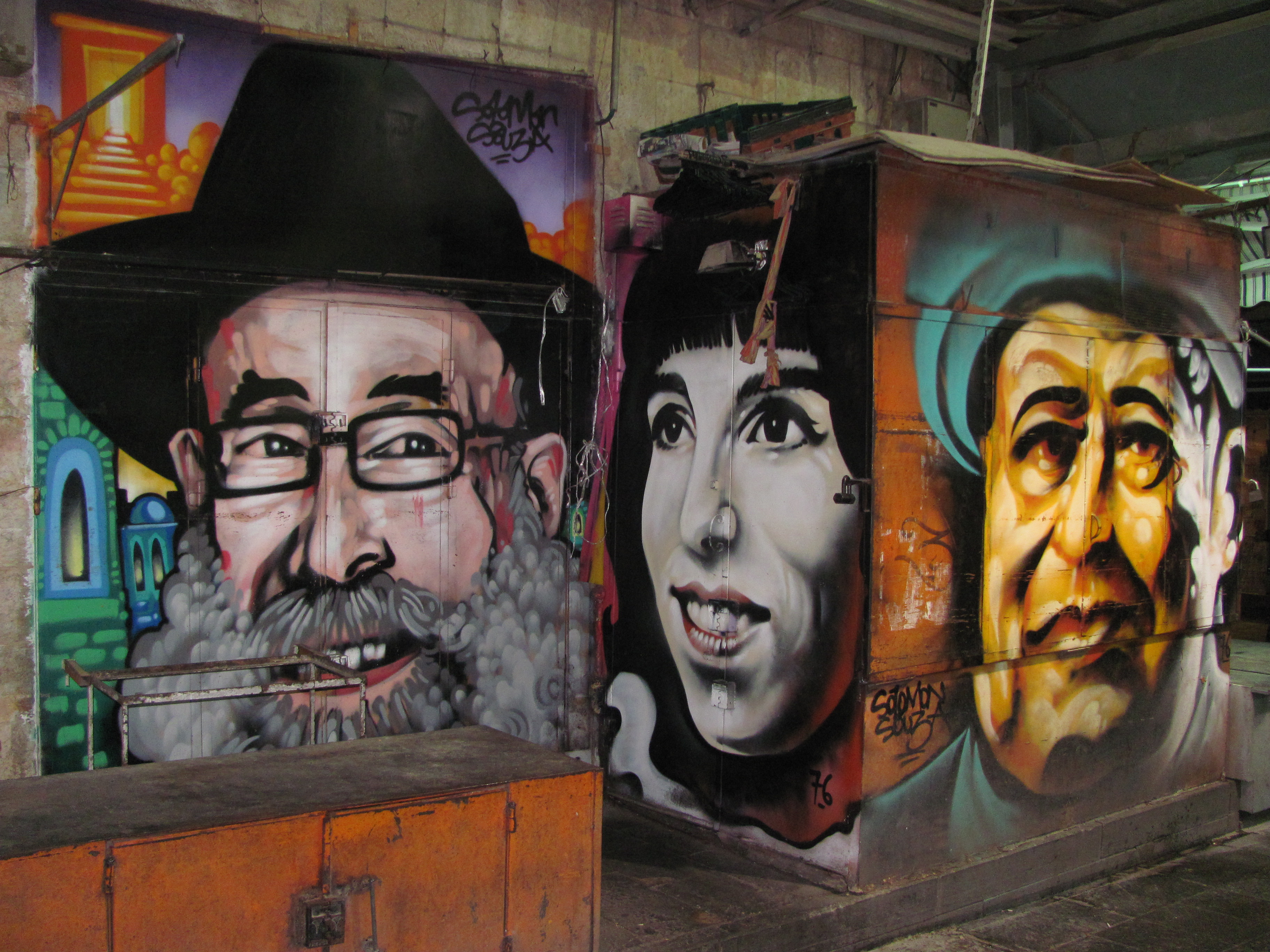
(L. to r.) Rabbi Shlomo ben David Lakein, Naomi Shemer, and a local storeowner

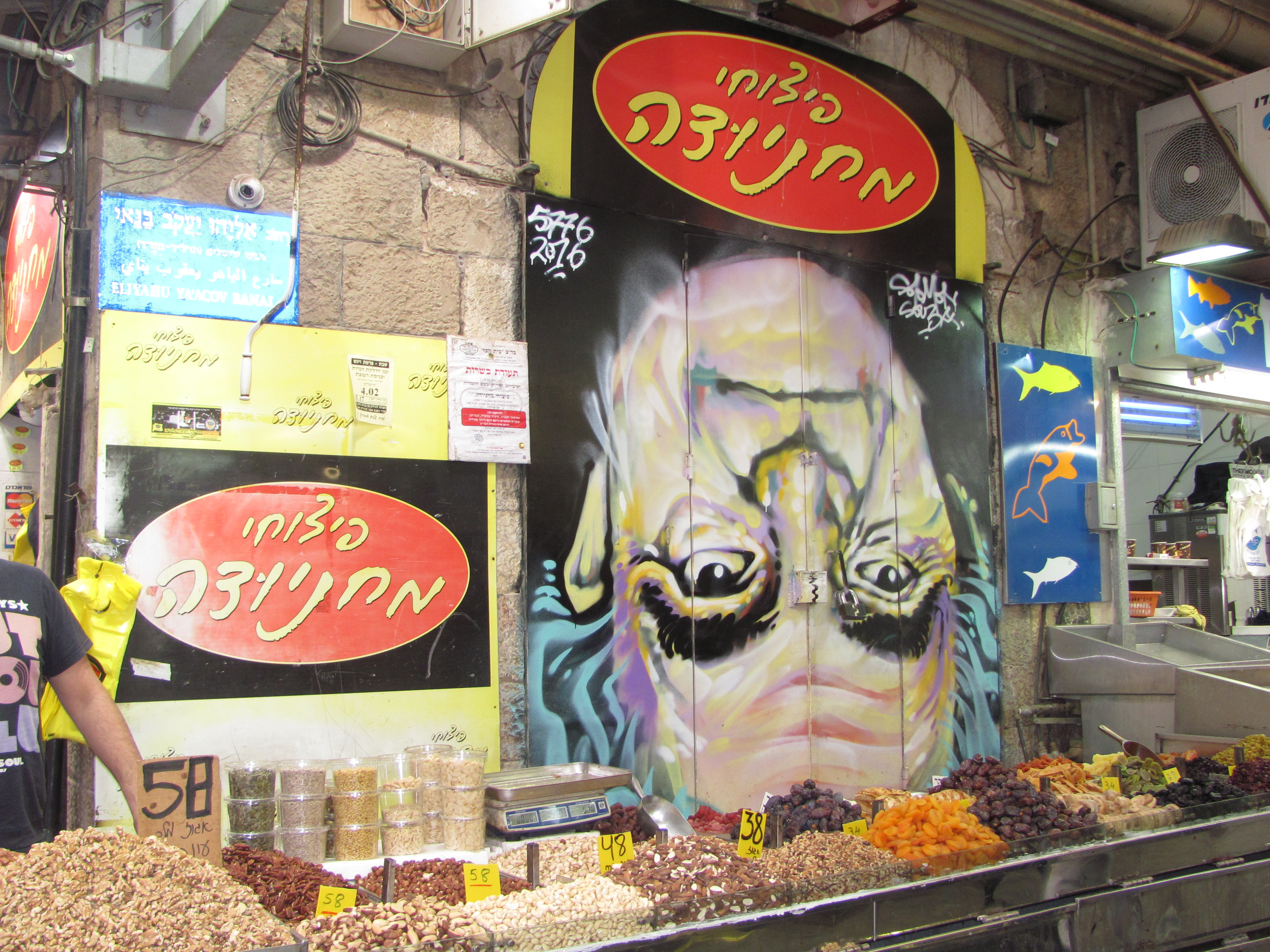
Upside-down portrait of David Ben-Gurion

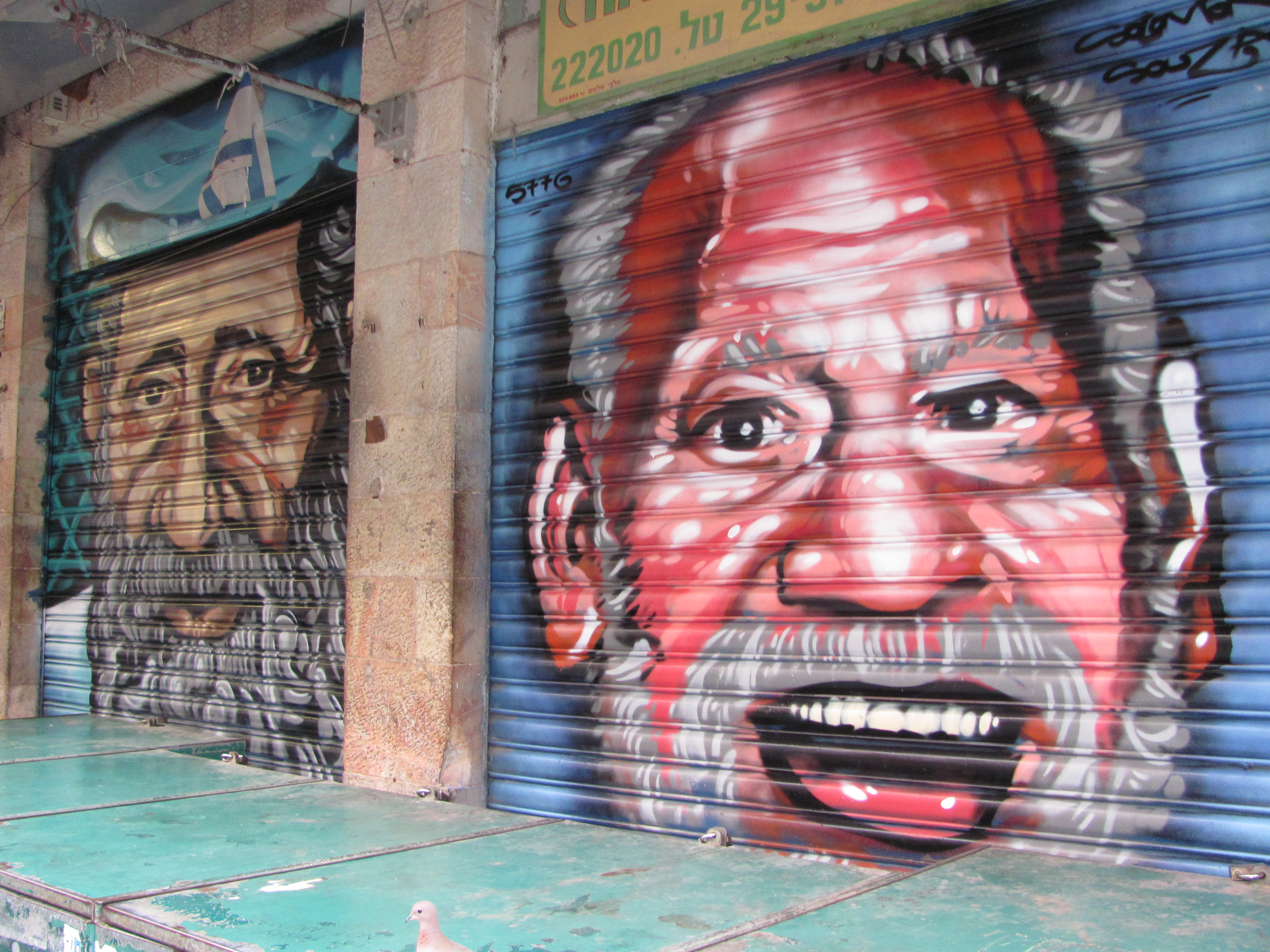
Local storeowners

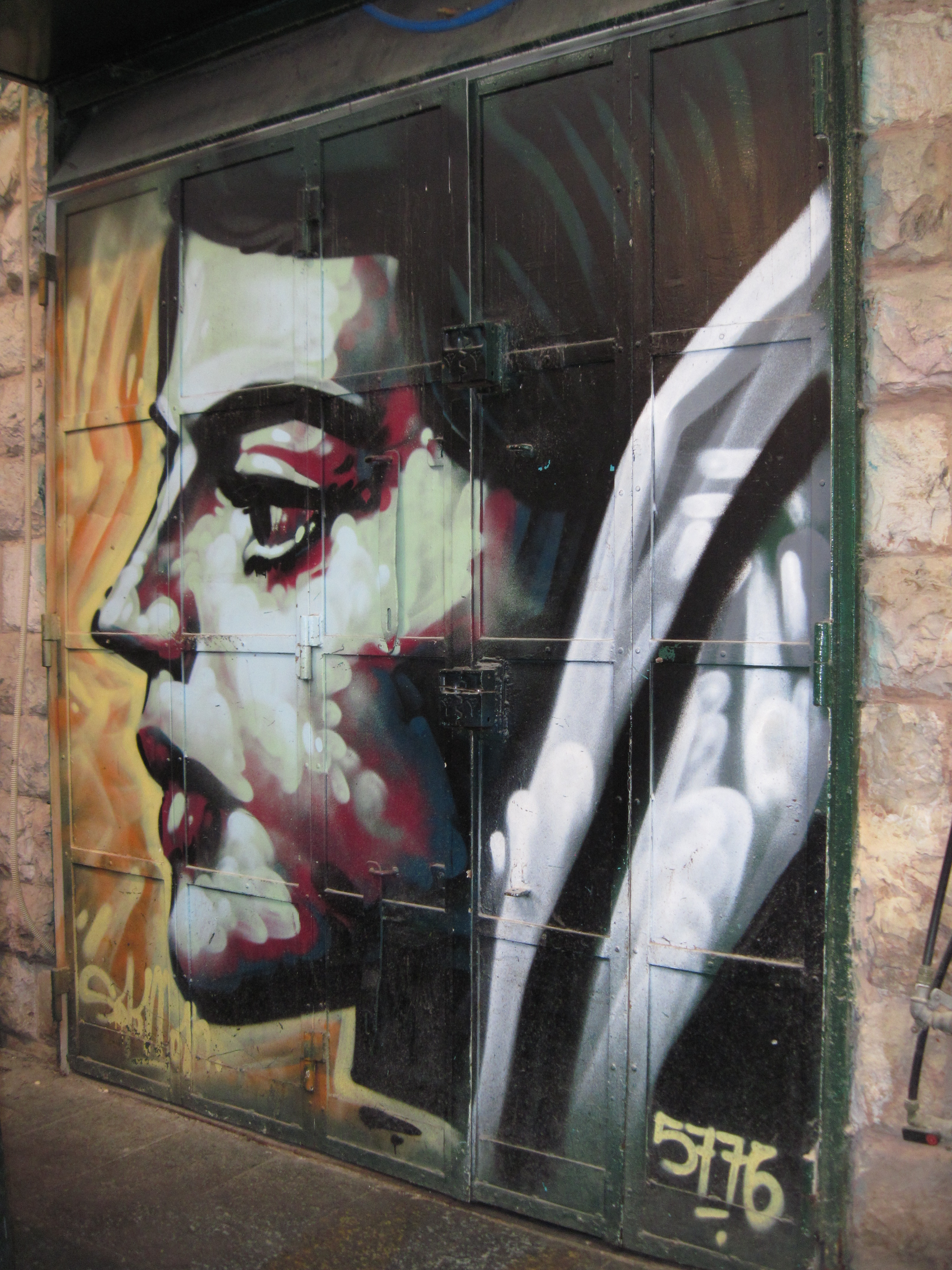
Hadassah

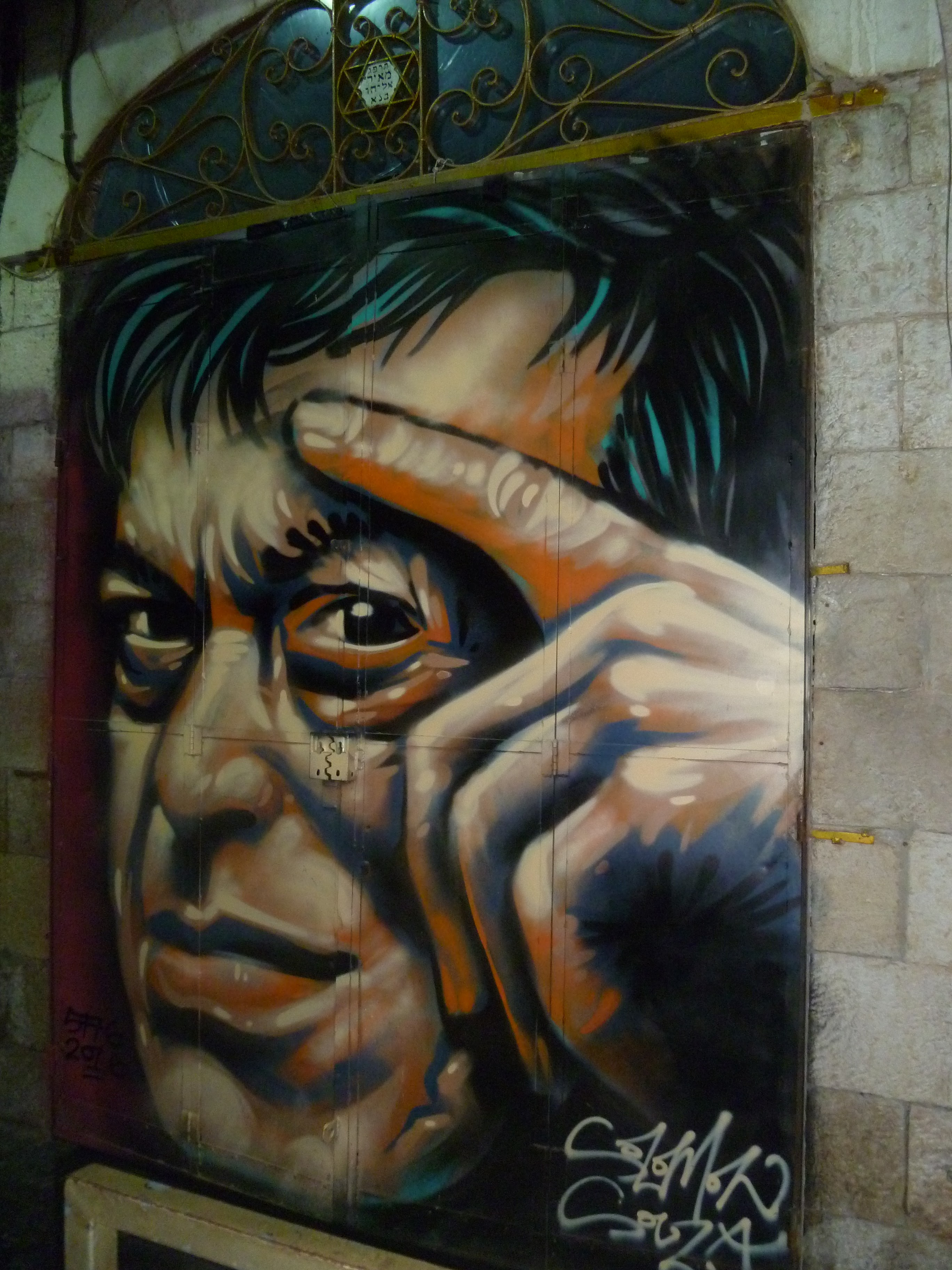
Yossi Banai

== Management ==
Machane Yehuda Management, which includes representatives from a variety of merchants, oversees the market's business development, in dialogue with Jerusalem's city hall, Ministry of Health, and other government entities. The market's new internet website was an initiative of three firms linked to Jerusalem entertainment and tourism: GoJerusalem.com, More Tourism & Gastronomy, and Action Packed Media.

== Restaurants ==
One notable restaurant in the market is Azura, a restaurant established in the 1950s. Known for its traditional Mizrahi Jewish cuisine, with a focus on Turkish, Iraqi, and Syrian dishes, Azura is considered a very popular restaurant locally. Notable dishes include moussaka, meat-stuffed eggplant, kubbeh and sofrito. This longstanding establishment evokes working-class nostalgia in Israel, and it was famously commemorated by Israeli singer Yossi Banai in a well-known song on his eponymous 1987 album.

Machneyuda is another popular restaurant in the market. Chefs in the open kitchen prepare contemporary dishes based on fresh ingredients sourced from the market, served swiftly amidst lively music. The restaurant, founded by international chefs Assaf Granit and Uri Navon, is known for dishes such as the Kurdish pastry kaddeh, truffle polenta, and shakshukit, a dish including kebab in yogurt-tahini sauce.

Adjacent to the market lies the Ima restaurant, specializing in Iraqi and Kurdish cuisine and famous for its kubbeh soup.

== Clientele ==
The market's mixture of shops and restaurants, which includes both kosher and halal establishments, attract residents and tourists, Israelis from Jerusalem and other parts of the country, rich and poor, young and old, religious and secular, Jews and non-Jews, including members of the Arab community. An estimated 200,000 people visit the shuk weekly. With over 20 bars and at least 10 restaurants, the “Shuk” is where the nightlife is happening in Jerusalem. With the tensions that are often pronounced among different ethnic, religious, and social groups, the shuk has been called "a national treasure."

== Hours of operation ==
Although some restaurants and cafes within Mahane Yehuda remain open on Shabbat and late into the night, food vendors normally follow a Sunday through Thursday schedule 8:00 am–7:00 pm, and a Friday schedule 8:00 am to approximately 3:00 pm. Sites with entertainment that do remain open late at night normally must adhere to the city's ban on loud music after 11:00 pm, with the exception of Israel Independence Day and Purim, the two days of the year when the ban is lifted.

== Transportation ==
Several bus lines serve the market at the Agrippas end and Jerusalem Light Rail, has a Mahane Yehuda station on Jaffa Road, across from the market. The new light rail stop has been linked both to the revival of the market and to plans for changes in the area surrounding it.

== Notable residents ==
Above a vegetable store
The building is empty now
The walls bare and worn

Yet immersed and sway
Reminiscent of holidays,
Of scented jasmine
Of an old tune that rings
Summoning to a feast

— From 1 HaAgas Street
by Ehud Banai

The first generation of the Banai family of actors and musicians originally lived at 1 HaAgas Street at the southern end of the market. In 2000 the Jerusalem municipality renamed this street as Eliyahu Yaakov Banai Street after the family's patriarch. (#1 HaAgas Street has been renumbered as #13 Eliyahu Yaakov Banai Street.) Ehud Banai, a family member, wrote a song entitled "1 HaAgas Street", which describes the life and atmosphere at the family home.

In 1976 Rami Levy opened his first store on Hashikma Street, one of the streets in the Mahane Yehuda district, selling food products to consumers at wholesale prices. Today Rami Levy Hashikma Marketing (TASE:RMLI) is the third largest food retailer in Israel.

== Holiday markets ==
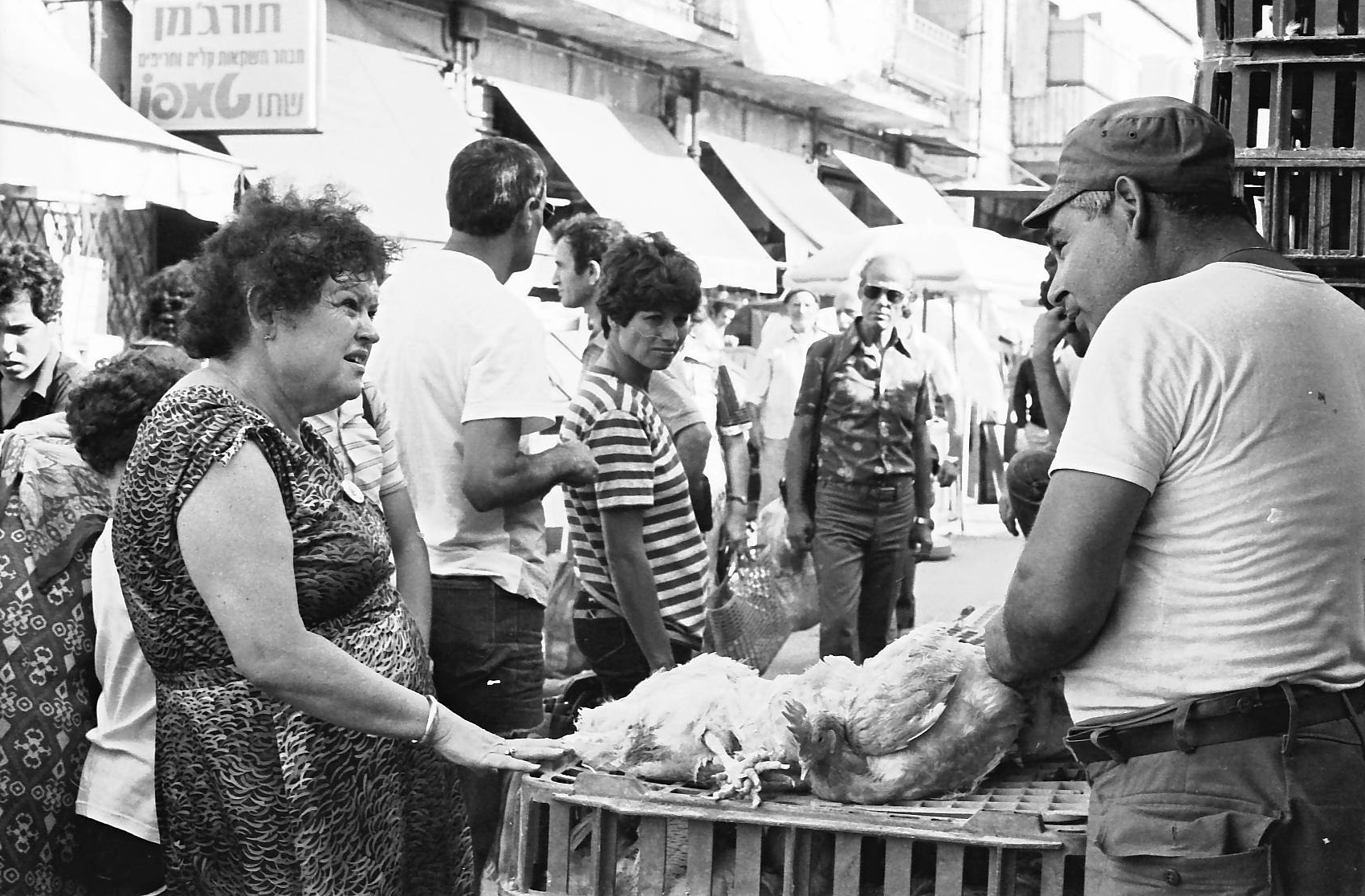
Merchant selling chickens for kapparot before Yom Kippur, circa 1983.

Before Rosh Hashana, the New Year, thousands of shoppers shop in the market for foods based on different holiday traditions: everything from pomegranates, dates, and assorted honey to fish heads. In the days between Rosh Hashana and Yom Kippur, a shuk kapparot (kapparot market) opens beside the Mahane Yehuda Market, where patrons perform the custom of swinging a live chicken over their heads, symbolically transferring their sins to the chicken, which is then slaughtered and donated to the poor. During the days before the holiday of Sukkot, a large tent opposite the Market, in Valero Square, hosts a shuk arba minim (Four Species market), where vendors sell lulavs, etrogs, and other ritual items used on this holiday. For other holidays with traditional foods, such as sufganiyot for Hanukka or hamentashen for Purim, the market offers many selections, sometimes with Purim hamentashen sold by vendors wearing holiday costumes. In advance of the Jewish holiday of Tu Bishvat, the Jewish "New Year for Trees," the market includes special displays of seeds, nuts, and dried fruits at discounted prices.

== Terrorist attacks ==
Mahana Yehuda is heavily guarded because it was a target for terrorist attacks during the Second Intifada.

- 1997 Mahane Yehuda Market Bombings: On July 30, 1997, 16 people were killed and 178 wounded in two consecutive suicide bombings.
- On November 6, 1998, two terrorists died when their bombs exploded prematurely.
- 2002 Mahane Yehuda Market bombing: On April 12, 2002, a female suicide bomber detonated at the entrance to the market, killing 6 and injuring 104. The Al-Aqsa Martyrs' Brigades claimed responsibility.

== See also ==
- Carmel Market
- Cuisine of Jerusalem
- Economy of Israel
- Culture of Israel
