= 2002 Mahane Yehuda Market bombing =

Terrorist attack in Jerusalem

2002 Mahane Yehuda Market Bombing
- Part of the Second Intifada militancy campaign
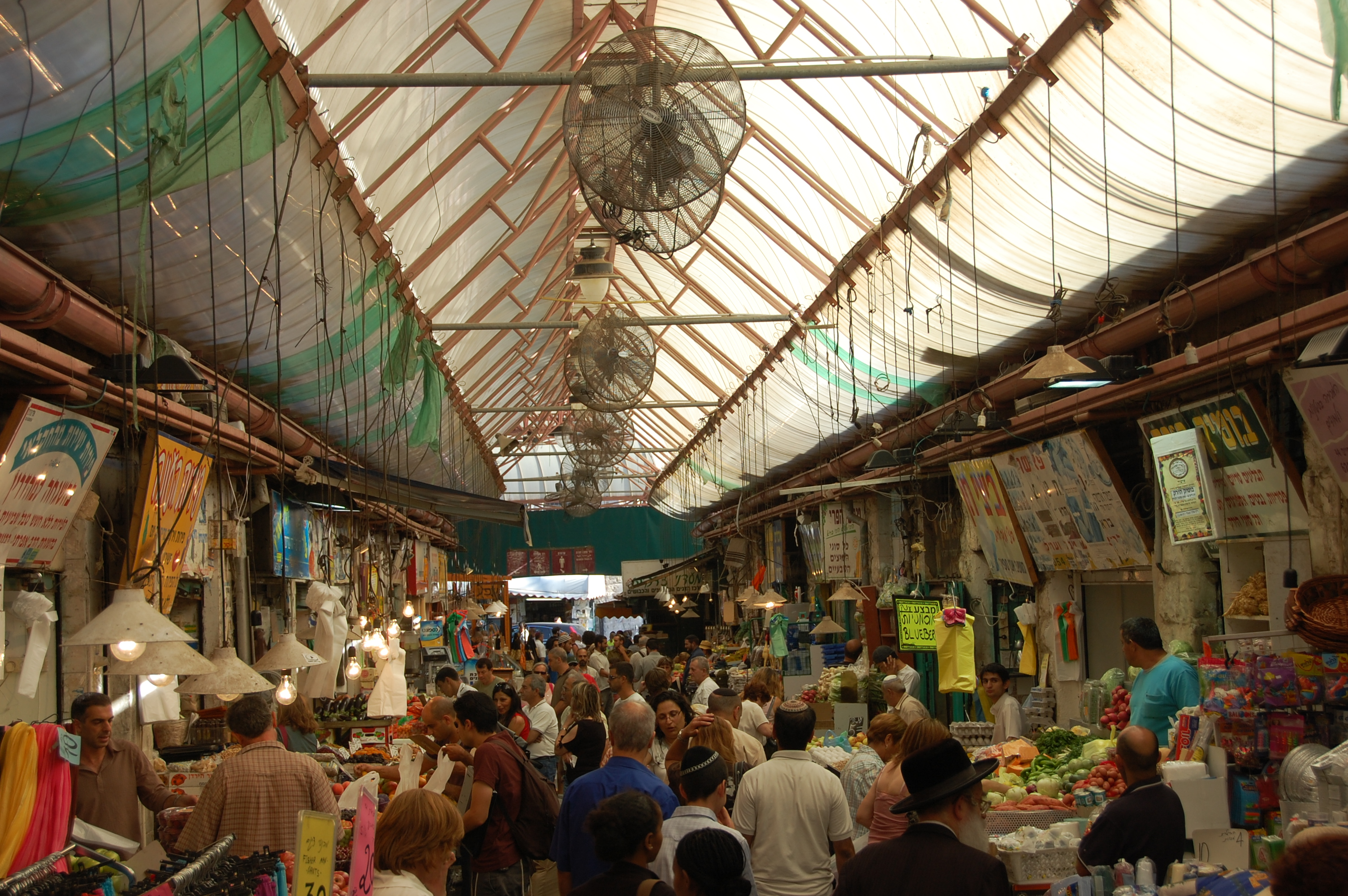
- Mahane Yehuda Market

- Location of Jerusalem in Israel
- Location: 31°47′05″N 35°12′45″E; Mahane Yehuda Market, Jerusalem
- Date: 12 April 2002 c. 4:00 pm (UTC+2)
- Attack type: Suicide bombing
- Deaths: 6 civilians (+1 bomber)
- Injuries: 104
- Perpetrator: Al-Aqsa Martyrs' Brigades claimed responsibility

A suicide bombing killing 6 civilians and injuring 104 people, occurred on 12 April 2002 at a bus stop located at a bus stop at the entrance to the Mahane Yehuda Market, Jerusalem's main fruit and vegetable market. The site of the attack was chosen in order to cause maximum number of casualties. The attack took place while US Secretary of State Colin Powell was visiting the region. The al-Aqsa Martyrs' Brigades claimed responsibility for the attack.

== The attack ==
On Friday, 12 April 2002, Andalib Suleiman, a Palestinian 17-year-old female suicide bomber, detonated an explosive device hidden on her body, shortly after 4:00 pm at a bus stop located at the entrance to the popular outdoor market, killing six civilians and injuring 104 people, many of them teenagers and tourists.

The terrorist first attempted to enter the market, but found security too tight. She then went to Jaffa Road and attempted to board a bus, but was prevented from boarding and set off her bomb, which was packed with nails to inflict maximum damage on victims. The bus was torn to pieces by the impact.

Muataz Muhammed Abdallah Himouni (21), of Hebron, arrested on 6 May 2002 claimed credit for planning the attack, supplying the bomber with explosives, and directing her to blow herself in a crowd at the Mahane Yehuda market or nearby Jaffa Road.

== Victims ==
Six people were killed in the attack and 104 people were wounded.

The victims were:

Nissan Cohen, 57, Jerusalem

Rivka Fink, 75, Jerusalem

Suheila Hushi, 48 Jerusalem

Yelena Konrab, 43, Jerusalem

Ling Chang Mai, 34, China

Chai Siang Yang, 32, China, w The Al-Aqsa Martyrs' Brigades claimed responsibility for the attack.

== Impact ==
A scheduled meeting between American Secretary of State Colin Powell and Palestinian Authority President Yasser Arafat was cancelled as a result of the bombing.

== See also ==
- 1997 Mahane Yehuda Market Bombings
