= 1997 Mahane Yehuda Market bombings =

Suicide bombing by Hamas in Jerusalem

- Location: Mahane Yehuda Market, Jerusalem
- Date: 30 July 1997; 13:15 pm (GMT+2)
- Attack type: suicide bombings
- Deaths: 16 civilians (+ 2 suicide bombers)
- Injuries: 178
- Perpetrator: Hamas claimed responsibility

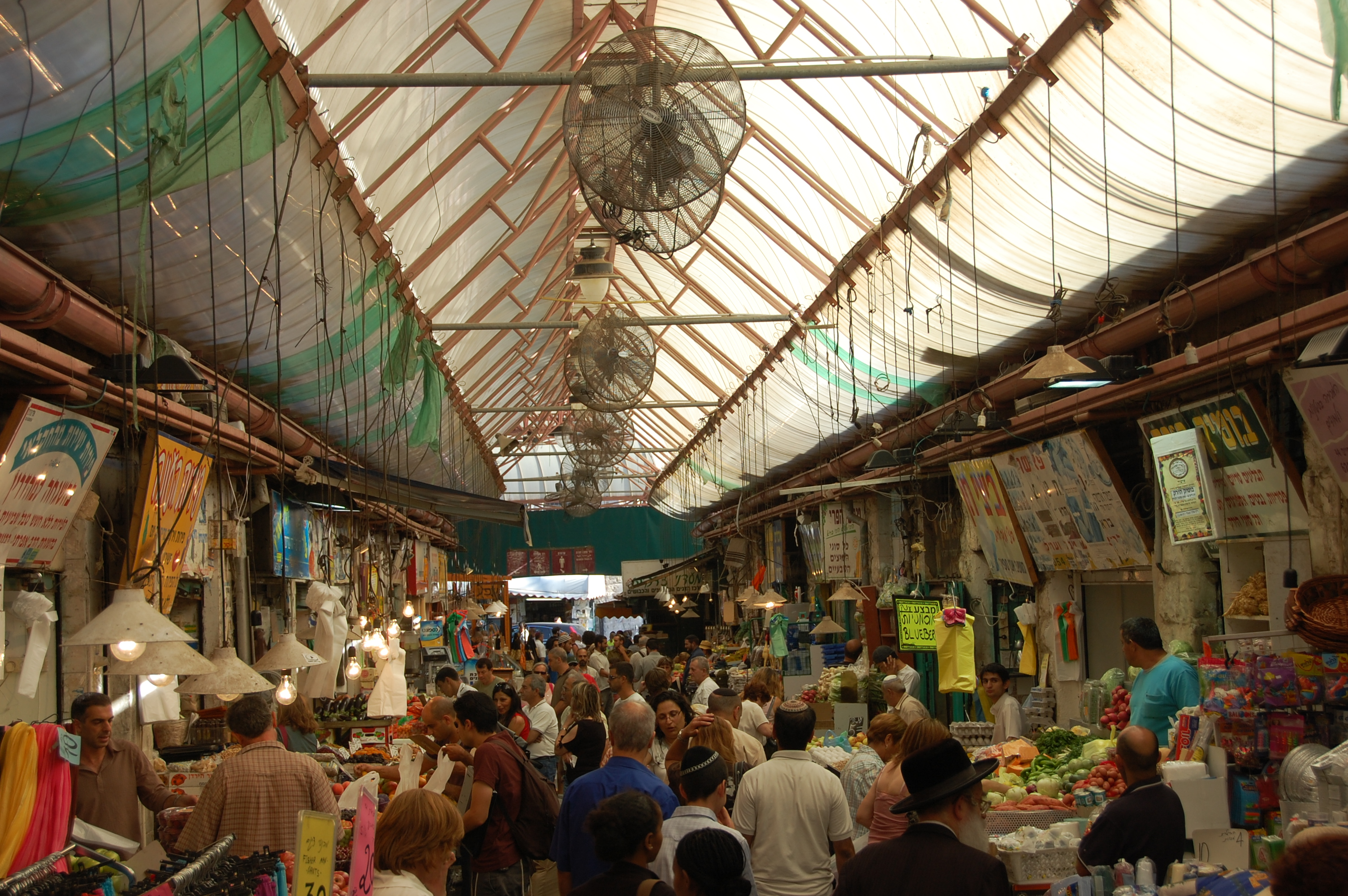
Mahane Yehuda Market in 2007, 10 years after the terrorist attack

Two consecutive suicide bombings were carried out by Hamas militants on 30 July 1997 at the Mahane Yehuda Market in Jerusalem, the city's main open-air fruit and vegetable market. Sixteen people were killed in the attack and 178 were injured.

== The attack ==
On Wednesday, 30 July 1997 at 1:15 pm, two Palestinian suicide bombers who carried bags laden with explosives and nails detonated their explosive devices 45 meters (150 feet) apart almost simultaneously in a central alley in the popular outdoor market, killing 16 civilians, among them an Arab resident of Eilabun, and injuring 178 people, many of them teenagers and tourists.

Thirteen Israelis were killed immediately and three others died later from their injuries. The Mahane Yehuda attack was followed by a triple suicide bombing on the Ben Yehuda pedestrian mall in downtown Jerusalem on 4 September, which killed five Israelis and wounded over 190.

== Victims ==
The people who were killed were:

- Lev Desyatnik, 60, of Jerusalem
- Regina Giber, 76, of Jerusalem
- Valentina Kovalenko, 67, of Jerusalem
- Shmuel Malka, 44, of Mevaseret Zion
- David Nasco, 44, of Mevaseret Zion
- Muhi A-din Othman, 33, of Eilabun
- Simha Fremd, Auschwitz survivor, 92, of Jerusalem
- Gregory Paskhovitz, 15, of Jerusalem
- Leah Stern, 50, of Jerusalem
- Rachel Tejgatrio, 83, of Jerusalem
- Liliya Zelezniak, 47, of Jerusalem
- Shalom (Golan) Zevulun, 52, of Jerusalem
- Mark Rabinowitz, 80, of Jerusalem
- Eli Adourian, 49, of Kfar Adumim (died of his wounds on 11 August)
- Ilya Gazarkh, 73, of Pisgat Ze'ev,Jerusalem, World War II Veteran , from Vitebsk, Belarus, USSR (died on 29 August)
- Baruch Ostrovsky, 84, of Jerusalem (died on 3 October 1997)

== Aftermath ==
In retaliation for these and other attacks, a decision was reached to target Hamas leaders. According to an Israeli press release, Mossad agents tried to poison chairman Khaled Mashal, who resided at the time in Jordan. The assassination attempt failed and the Mossad agents were captured by the Jordanian authorities. They were later released in exchange for the release of Sheikh Ahmed Yassin, the founder and "spiritual leader" of Hamas who was serving a life sentence in an Israeli prison.

== See also ==
- 2002 Mahane Yehuda Market bombing
