= Nadia Chilkovsky Nahumck =

American dancer (1908–2006)

- Born: Nadia Chilkovsky; January 8, 1908; Kiev, Russian Empire
- Died: April 23, 2006 (aged 98); Blue Bell, Pennsylvania, U.S.
- Occupations: A pioneer in modern dance, dance pedagogy and Labanotation and founder of the Philadelphia Dance Academy
- Spouse: Nicholas Nahumck (m. 1941)

Nadia Chilkovsky Nahumck (January 8, 1908, Kiev, Russian Empire – April 23, 2006, Blue Bell, Pennsylvania) was a pioneer in modern dance, dance pedagogy and Labanotation. Described by The Philadelphia Inquirer as a "modern-dance innovator and educator", she founded the Philadelphia Dance Academy in 1944, and was a director and instructor there for three decades.

She also became known for her advocacy work, urging parents and policymakers to place as much value on the arts in education as they did on mathematics and science.

"Every time you move around when you are alone, you perform a soliloquy at a very intimate level. You would probably not use similar movements in public. Human movement reveals things about personality that your tongue will never say. The way people move can tell us if they like to live in a large or small space, whether they are impatient, whether they are aggressive, whether they have initiative, drive, enthusiasm. I say there's a transfer from disciplining the body in dance to disciplining the mind in math class."

== Formative years and family ==
Nadia Chilkovsky wed Nicholas Nahumck in 1941. A native of Spring Valley, New York, and son of Nicholas and Anastasia Nahumck, he served in the United States Navy during World War II, graduated from the Pennsylvania Academy of the Fine Arts in Philadelphia in 1949, and then worked as a book artist and illustrator. He died at the couple's home in East Greenville on November 20, 1993.

== Dance career ==
Nahumck began her dance studies in Philadelphia in 1924 at Riva Hoffman's studio. Hoffman was a proponent of Isadora Duncan's dance style. Nahumck danced with the Irma Duncan company from 1930 to 1931 and was well known as a premier Duncan dancer. In 1929, she moved to New York City, where she studied with Hanya Holm, Mary Wigman, Martha Graham, Louis Horst, and at Anna Duncan's studio.

On March 23, 1930, she made "her first appearance in a dance recital" at Chicago's Civic Repertory Theatre."

In 1931, Nahumck co-founded the New Dance Group. On October 27, 1933, she presented an interpretive dance program at the Twentieth Century Club in Boston in conjunction with an art exhibit that was sponsored by the John Reed Club. Her original dances "included 'Negro Work Songs,' 'Song of the Machine,' 'Parasite,' and 'Revolt.'"

She returned from New York to Philadelphia in about 1943. The next year, she established her own dance school, the Philadelphia Dance Academy, which incorporated modern, folk, ballet, Duncan and other dance traditions, as well as Labanotation.

In partnership with the University of Pennsylvania, she was awarded a $195,000 grant from the United States government in 1967 to "devise a dance curriculum for junior and senior high schools across the country, stressing the dance as an art subject rather than physical education."

A decade later, Nahumck's Philadelphia Dance Academy was absorbed by the Philadelphia College of the Performing Arts in 1977; it continues today as the University of the Arts School of Dance.

In addition to her dance career, she also served on the faculty of the Academy of Vocal Arts in Philadelphia where she taught dramatic movement.

== Death ==
Nadia Chilkovsky Nahumck died in 2006, aged 98, at the Sunrise Senior Living Center in Blue Bell, Pennsylvania.

== Sources ==
- The University of the Arts University Libraries. University of the Arts Name Changes
- Dunning, Jennifer (April 29, 2006). "Nadia Chilkovsky Nahumck, 98, Dancer". The New York Times.
- Garafola, Lynn, ed. "Of, By, and For the People: Dancing on the Left in the 1930s". Madison, WI: Society of Dance History Scholars, 1994.
- International Encyclopedia of Dance: A Project of Dance Perspectives, Inc. New York: Oxford University Press, 1998. See index under Chilkovsky and under Nahumck.
- Lloyd, Margaret. The Borzoi Book of Modern Dance. New York: Alfred A. Knopf, 1949.
- "N. C. Nahumck, 98, dance innovator" (obituary), Philadelphia Inquirer, May 1, 2006, p. B14.
- Foulkes, Julia L. "'Angels Rewolt!': Jewish Women in Modern Dance in the 1930s", American Jewish History, v. 88, no. 2 (June 2000), pp. 233–252.
- Kevles, Barbara. "A 20th Century School of Dance", Dance Magazine, v. 38 (May 1964), pp. 20–22.
