= Solomon Souza =

British-Israeli street artist (born 1993)

Solomon Souza שלמה סוזה
- Born: Solomon Souza-Kohn; 1993 (age 32–33); London, England
- Known for: Spray-painted murals in Mahane Yehuda Market, Jerusalem
- Style: Street art
- Spouse: Ayelet Finkelstein (m. 2021)
- Relatives: F. N. Souza (grandfather)

Solomon Souza (Hebrew: שלמה סוזה; born 1993) is a British-Israeli street artist. He is best known for spray painting portraits of contemporary and historical figures on the metal shutters of the Mahane Yehuda Market ("The Shuk") in Jerusalem, turning them into an after-hours attraction.

== Early and personal life ==
Solomon Souza was born in London, and grew up in the neighbourhood of Hackney. His mother, British-Israeli painter Karen (Keren) Souza-Kohn, is one of the three daughters of Indian artist F. N. Souza, and Czech Jewish actress Liselotte Kristian (née Kohn). (His grandfather F. N. Souza's bestselling 1955 painting Birth depicts his grandmother Liselotte posing while pregnant with his mother Keren.)

His younger sister Miriam is a filmmaker. He has been married to Ayelet Finkelstein since February 2021.

Largely self-taught, Solomon Souza has worked on murals since he was 14 years old.

== Mahane Yehuda Market ==
As of July 2018, Souza had painted more than 250 of the 360 shutters in the market. Each painting takes two to four hours to complete. Souza usually completes three murals per night.

Subjects include contemporary and historical figures, including Yossi Banai, Roseanne Barr, Menachem Begin, David Ben-Gurion (painted upside-down), Albert Einstein, Mahatma Gandhi, Ze'ev Jabotinsky, Meyer Lansky, Emma Lazarus, Bob Marley, Matisyahu, Golda Meir, Moses Montefiore, Dona Gracia Nasi, Daniel Pearl, Jonathan Pollard, Naomi Shemer, Steven Spielberg, Hannah Szenes, Henrietta Szold, and Bracha Zefira. There are nearly one dozen rabbinical portraits, including Mordechai Eliyahu, Abraham Joshua Heschel, Yitzhak Kaduri, Maimonides, Shneur Zalman of Liadi, and Ovadia Yosef. Arab personalities are also represented, including Lucy Aharish, Sheikh Fari al-Jabari of Hebron, Si Ali Sakkat, and the Queen of Sheba. Biblical paintings include Moses, Solomon, and panels depicting the seven days of creation. Some of the early paintings are of the stall owners themselves, or their grandfathers, by personal request.

The murals have become an after-hours and Saturday attraction, when stalls are closed and the shutters and metal doors are visible.

== Other murals ==
Souza was invited in 2019 by Vivek Menezes, the special projects curator for the Serendipity Arts Festival in Goa, India to do a similar art project there. Souza created murals of various prominent Goans, past and present.

In January 2020, Chelsea FC unveiled a mural by Souza on an outside wall of the West Stand at Stamford Bridge stadium. The mural is part of Chelsea's 'Say No to Antisemitism' campaign funded by club owner Roman Abramovich. Included on the mural are depictions of footballers Julius Hirsch and Árpád Weisz, who were killed at Auschwitz concentration camp, and Ron Jones, a British prisoner of war known as the 'Goalkeeper of Auschwitz'.

== Other projects ==
In July 2021, Zionist activist Rudy Rochman and two other Israelis presented a Torah scroll, with its cover designed by Solomon Souza, to an Igbo Jewish community in Nigeria just before the three Israelis were arrested by the Nigerian police.

== Gallery ==
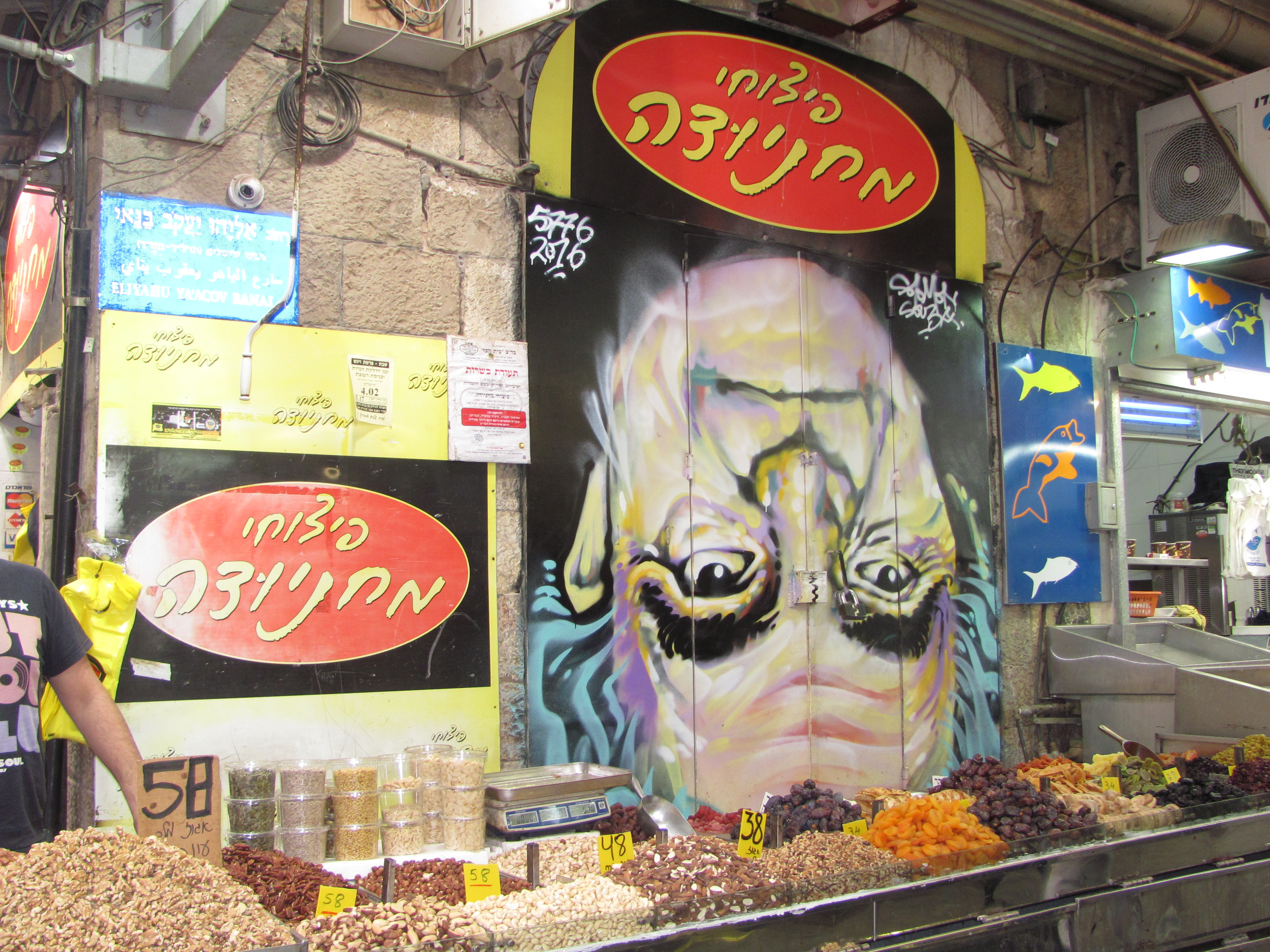
Upside-down portrait of David Ben-Gurion

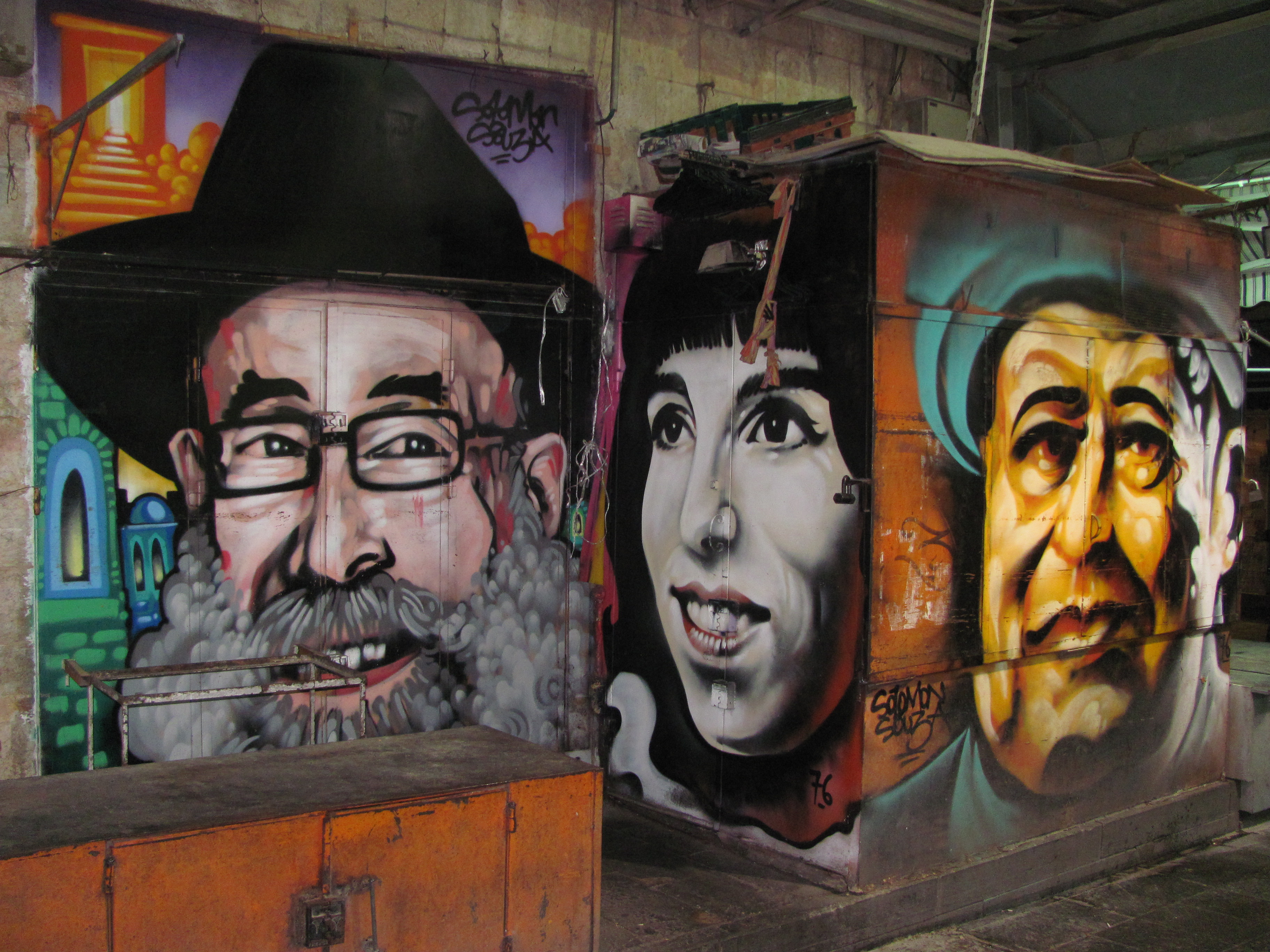
(L. to r.) Rabbi Shlomo ben David Lakein, Naomi Shemer, and local storeowner

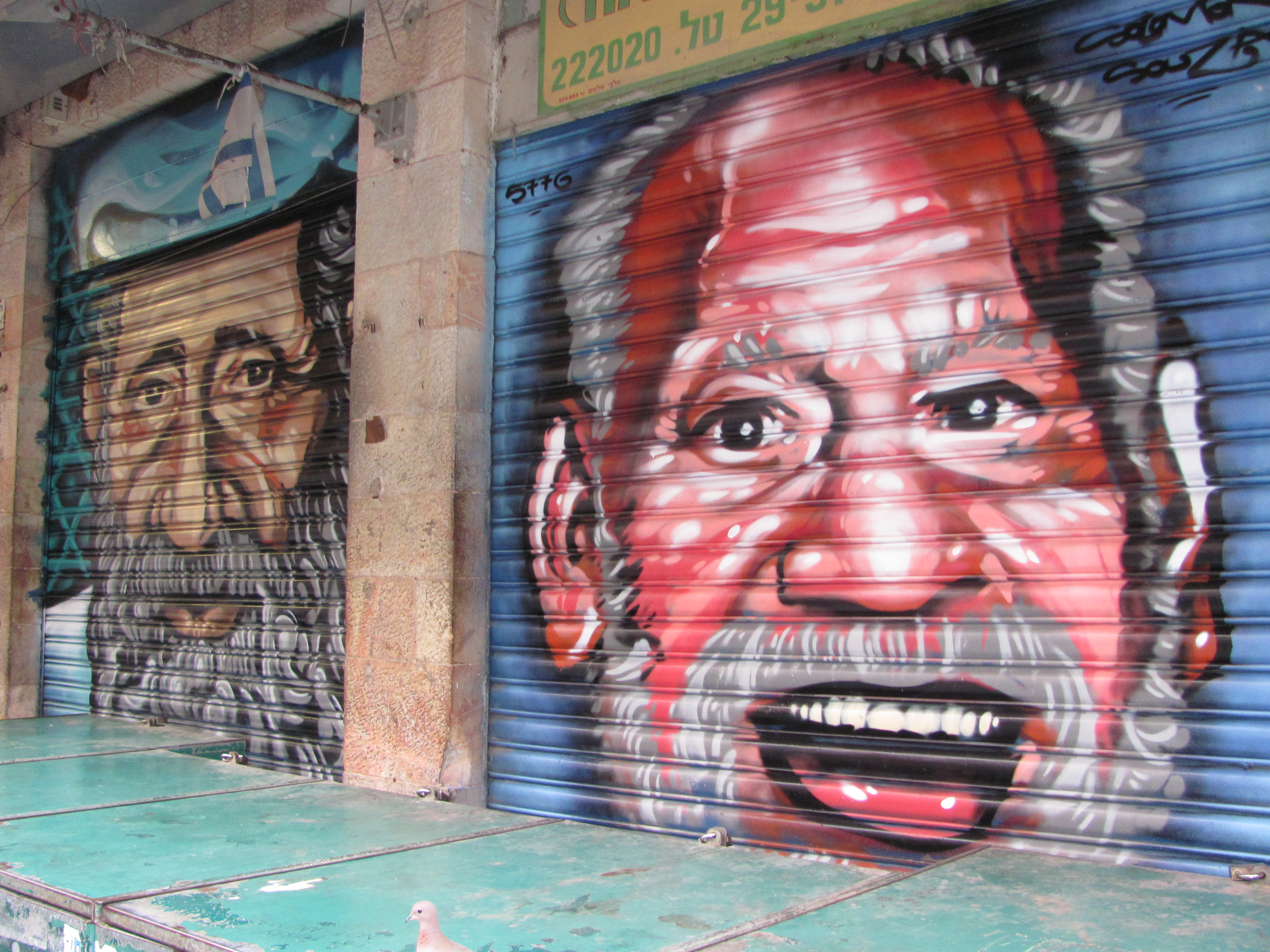
Local storeowners

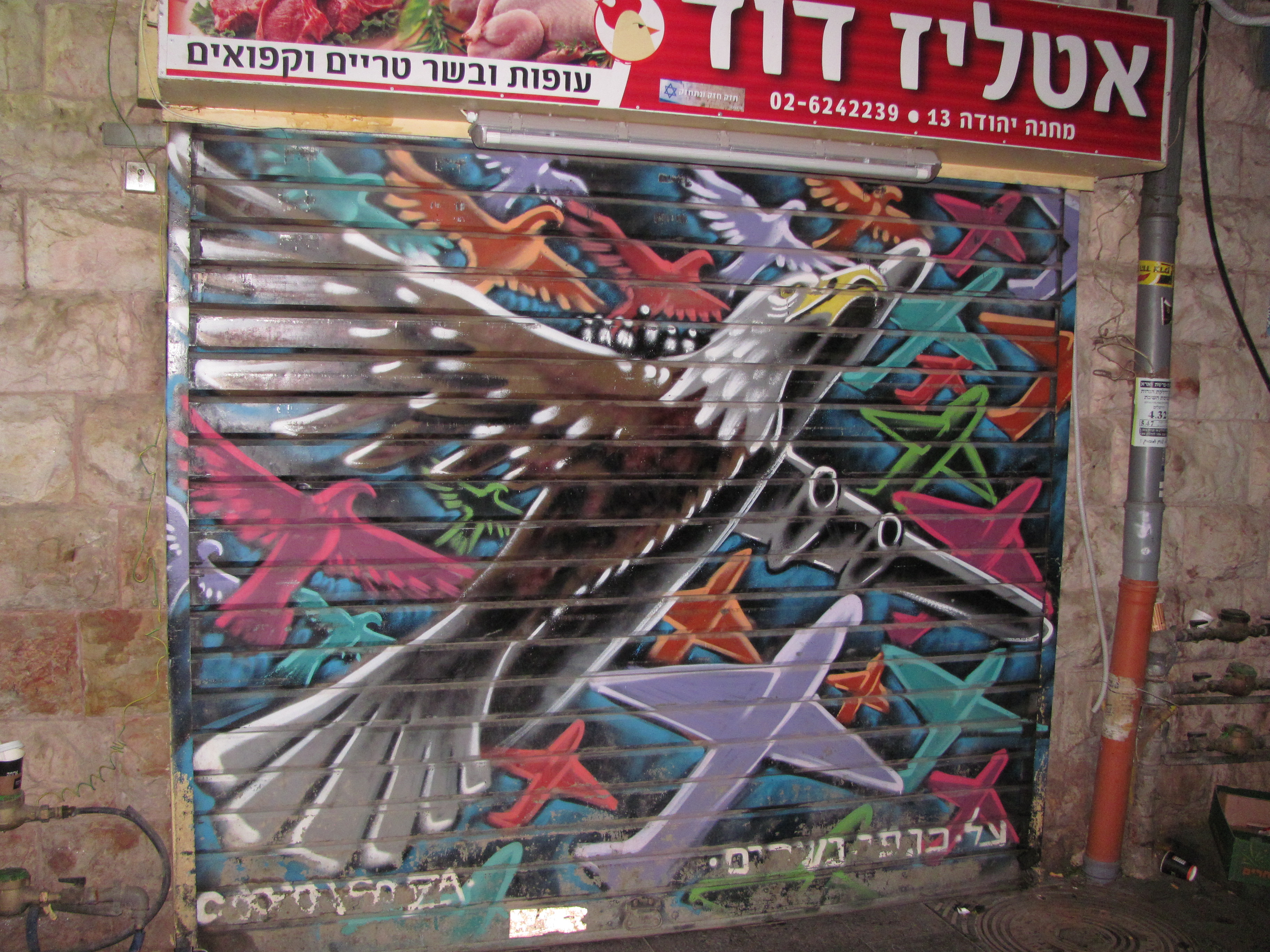
Tribute to Operation Magic Carpet

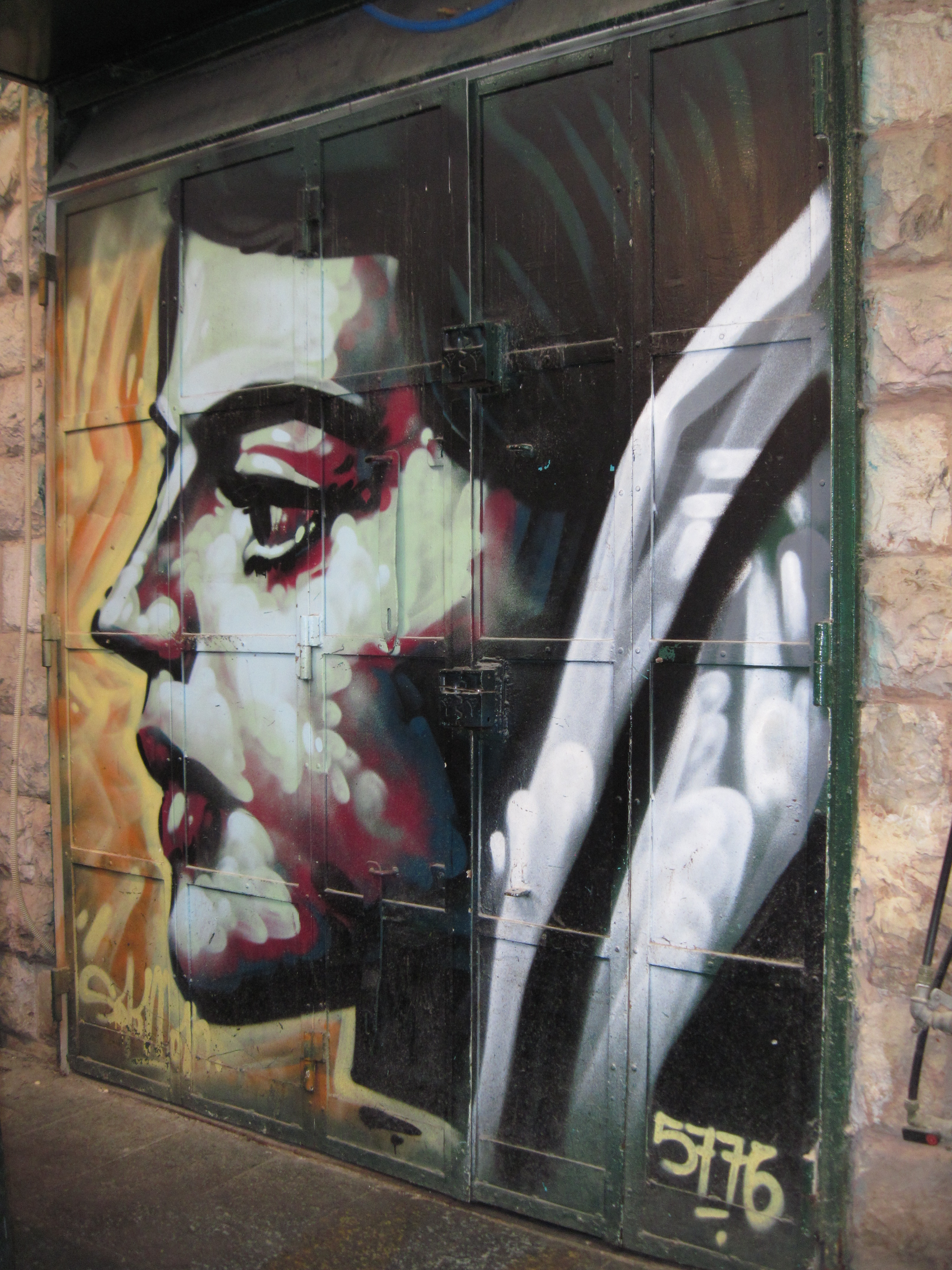
Hadassah
