= New Dance Group =

American dance organization

- Founded: 1932
- Type: Non-profit
- Location: New York City

New Dance Group, or more casually NDG, is a performing arts organization in New York City, United States.

== History ==
New Dance Group was established in 1932 by a group of artists and choreographers dedicated to social change through dance and movement. The founders – Nadia Chilkovsky Nahumck, Fanya Geltman, Miriam Blecher, Edith Lambert, Edna Ocko, Rebecca Rosenberg, Pauline Schrifman and Grace Wylie – were students at Hanya Holm's dance studio in New York City, and soon their philosophy attracted a wide student base of ordinary workers and dancers. For just a dime, students received an hour-long dance class, an hour of improvisation based on a social theme, and an hour of discussion on social issues. Those members wishing to choreograph followed two rules: dance about something important to you, and create work so that the audience could understand the dance's thrust. As one of many groups performing under the umbrella of the leftist Workers Dance League, the New Dance Group quickly established itself as a leader in the field, presenting dances that not only spoke forcefully about social ills but also adhered to high artistic standards.

New Dance Group soon expanded to include dancers, choreographers, and teachers from different techniques. Sophie Maslow, Anna Sokolow, Jean Erdman, and Jane Dudley came from Martha Graham's company; Bill Bales and Joe Gifford hailed from the Humphrey-Weidman group; and Eve Gentry and Mary Anthony, like the original founders, first worked with Hanya Holm. Modern techniques were not the only staple at the New Dance Group's studio. Erdman taught Hawaiian dance, Hadassah taught Indian and Jewish/Israeli dance forms, and Pearl Primus and Beryl McBurnie offered classes in Caribbean and African dance forms. Ballet was eventually added to the roster as well, with some classes taught by Broadway dancer Wayne Lamb. Paul Draper taught tap, and Al Brooks taught the Holm technique. The diversity in dance was indicative of a greater philosophy: at a time when American society was laced with discrimination, New Dance Group welcomed people of all races and religions.

Just as the founders of the New Dance Group were dedicated to working collectively, the members who strengthened the organization into the 1940s and 1950s frequently collaborated with one another. Jane Dudley, Sophie Maslow, and Bill Bales teamed together in the Dudley-Maslow-Bales Trio, which toured very successfully in the 1940s. New Dance Group festivals featured varied programs with choreography by many of the abovementioned artists as well as newcomers Donald McKayle, Talley Beatty, and Daniel Nagrin.

From its inception during the Great Depression through the early 1960s, New Dance Group was a major hub of activity in the vibrant New York City dance scene; indeed, the studio's array of offerings made it a popular destination for aspiring dancers, while the roster of choreographers offered scores of dancers with performance opportunities. Although the organization gradually faded from prominence and was rarely given its due in the annals of dance scholarship, the rich history of New Dance Group has been uncovered and celebrated in recent years. The American Dance Guild presented a retrospective New Dance Group Gala concert in 1993, assembling works by Mary Anthony, Ronne Aul, Talley Beatty, Valerie Bettis, Irving Burton, Jane Dudley, Jean Erdman, Eve Gentry, Joseph Gifford, Hadassah, Sophie Maslow, Donald McKayle, Daniel Nagrin, Pearl Primus, Anna Sokolow, Joyce Trisler, and Charles Weidman. On July 28, 2000, the Library of Congress, along with the Dance Heritage Coalition, identified New Dance Group as one of "America's Irreplaceable Dance Treasures: The First 100". From 2005–2007, the National Museum of Dance featured the New Dance Group in the exhibit "Dancing Rebels: The New Dance Group," which focused on the organization's activities and membership from 1932 until 1960. While some members of New Dance Group were inducted into the museum's Hall of Fame individually, the group itself was given this honor in 2006. Many of the choreographers who presented work with New Dance Group are featured in the American Dance Legacy Institute's "Dancing Rebels" anthology, and some of their masterpieces are preserved in the Institute's documentaries.

Although there is currently a studio and company in New York City called New Dance Group, the dancers and choreographers who built the original institution and contributed to its heyday through the 1960s are not affiliated with this new entity. The later New Dance Group fosters the arts through multiple disciplines and focuses on four program areas: Arts and Education, Presentation and Production, Media Communications, Fund-Raising Program. Information below pertains to this more recently founded entity and not to the original New Dance Group.

== New Dance Group 2006–2009 ==
On September 18, 2006, the New Dance Group officially opened the doors to a new state-of-the art 21,000-square-foot (2,000 m^{2}) studio located at 305 West 38th Street just west of 8th Avenue. Nearly double the size of its prior location (where it had resided for 55 years), New Dance Group's renovated upgrade, led by architect Howard Spivak, included two floors of studios complete with sprung wood or Marley flooring, pianos, floor to ceiling mirrors, a recording studio and vocal room, sound systems, large dressing rooms, teacher lounge, stretch area, private entrance, art exhibit gallery, merchandise boutique, and two performance spaces complete with raked seating for over 100 people. This space was used for all NDG programming but was also available for rentals.

New Dance Group offered classes for the novice to the professional in dance, fitness and theatre arts seven days a week. Classes for teens and adults included modern, hip-hop, ballet, tap, jazz, Latin, ethnic, yoga, pilates, voice, and acting. Performance programs included The Exchange, an emerging artists series, and the Teacher Performance Series.

In 2007, New Dance Group became part of the biggest collaboration in the history of American Theatre. Over 600 theaters joined a grassroots premiere of plays in Atlanta, Austin, Chicago, Colorado, Greater Texas, Los Angeles, Minnesota, New York City, The Northeast, San Francisco, Seattle, The Southeast, Washington, D.C., the Western U.S. and Universities The 365 National Festival was produced by Suzan-Lori Parks and Bonnie Metzgar. The company toured many productions through 2007 and 2008, including pieces by Anabella Lenzu and Rick Schussel.

New Dance Group operations closed permanently in 2009, due in large part to the Artistic Director, Schussel, stealing large sums of money from the organization. Hadassah collection of New Dance Group Studio, Inc. records, The New York Public Library.
