= Zoharei Chama Synagogue =

Orthodox synagogue in Jerusalem

- Hebrew: בית הכנסת זהרי חמה
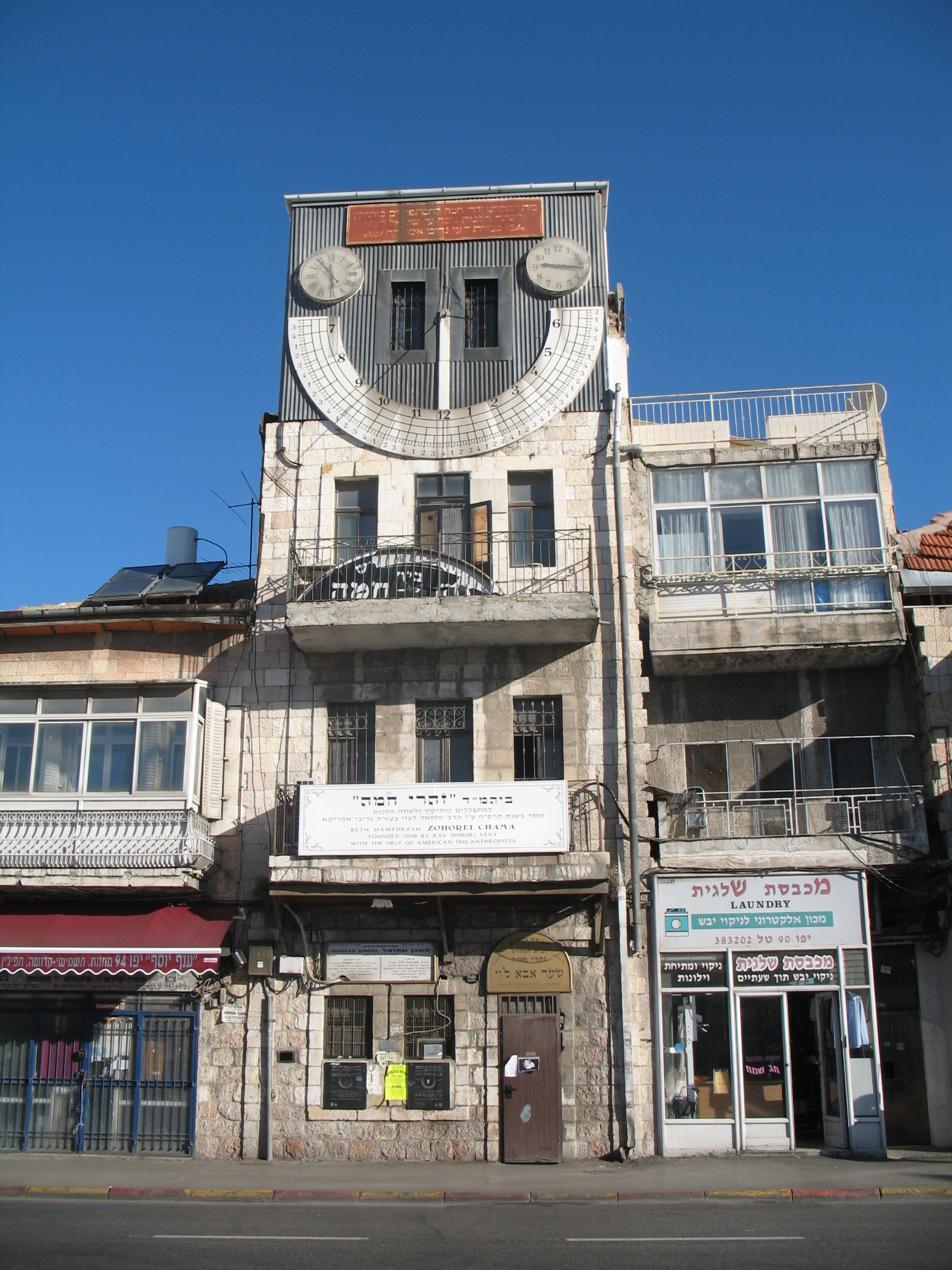
- The synagogue façade, in 2007

- Location of the synagogue in Jerusalem

Religion
- Affiliation: Orthodox Judaism
- Rite: Nusach Ashkenaz
- Ecclesiastical or organisational status: Synagogue
- Status: Active

Location
- Location: 92 Jaffa Road, Mahane Yehuda, Jerusalem
- Country: Israel
- Coordinates: 31°47′09″N 35°12′47″E

Architecture
- Type: Synagogue architecture
- Founder: Rabbi Shmuel Levy
- Groundbreaking: 1906
- Completed: 1917; 1980 (renovation)
- Materials: Stone; timber
- Building details
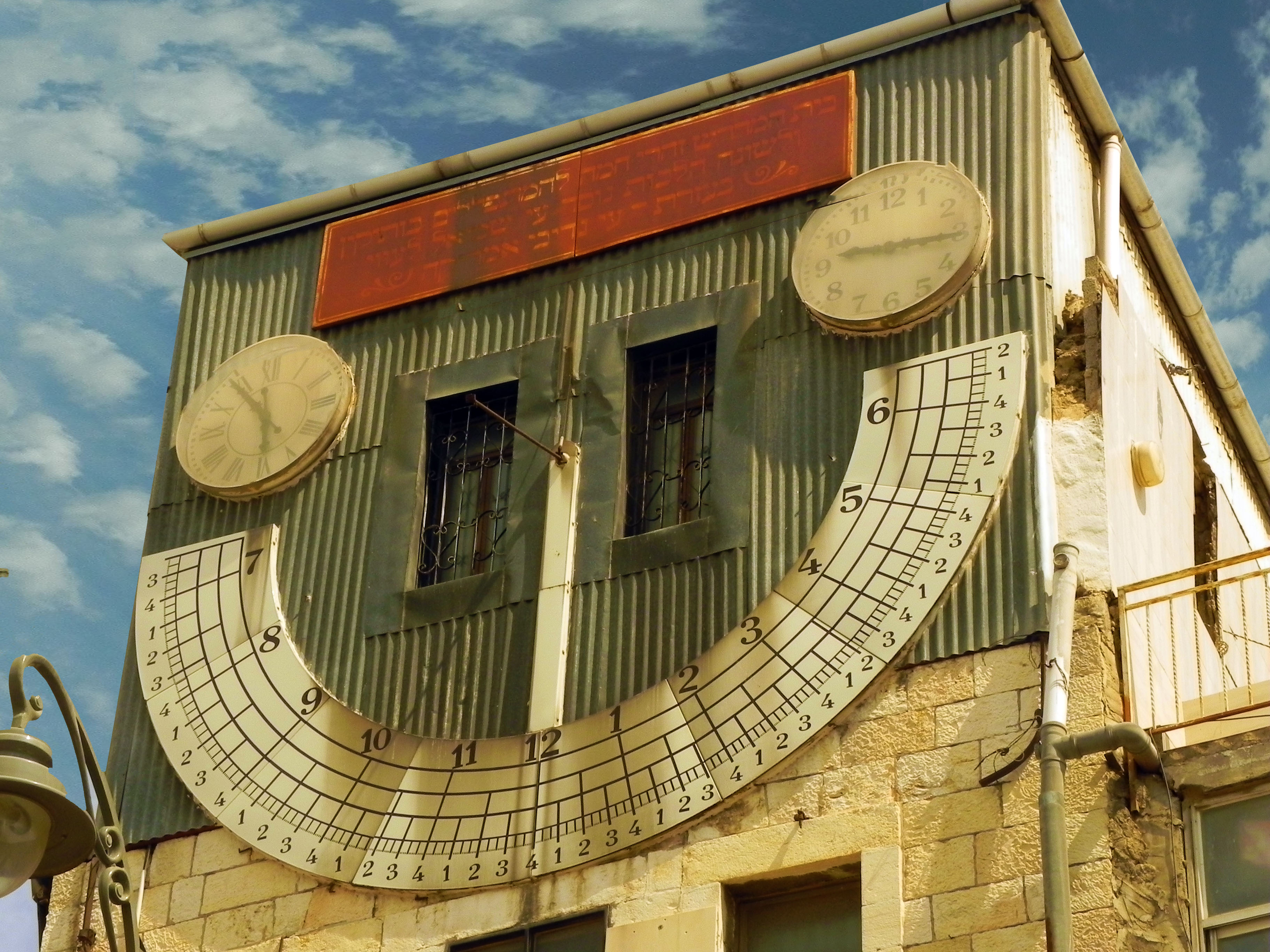
- Sundial of Zoharei Chama
- Alternative names: Mahane Yehuda Clock Tower; Sundial Building

Dimensions
- Other dimensions: 5-metre (16 ft) sundial

The Zoharei Chama Synagogue (Hebrew: בית הכנסת זהרי חמה, lit. 'Sunrise Synagogue'), also spelled Zohorei Chama, colloquially known as the Sundial Building or Mahane Yehuda Clock Tower, is an Orthodox Jewish congregation and synagogue, located on Jaffa Road in Jerusalem, Israel.

The four-story stone building with a wooden attic features a huge, 5-metre-diameter (16 ft) sundial on its façade. The building, constructed in stages by Rabbi Shmuel Levy from 1908 to 1917, was built to house a hostel for immigrants and a synagogue. The building was damaged by fire in 1941 and partly restored by the Jerusalem municipality in 1980. The building houses the Zoharei Chama Orthodox synagogue, which has prayer services throughout the day for local businessmen, residents and tourists.

== History ==
The tall, narrow building, which towers over the neighboring structures, was constructed by Rabbi Shmuel Levy, an American tailor who immigrated to Israel from the United States at the beginning of the 20th century. In 1906 he purchased a one-story house in the Mahane Yehuda neighborhood on Jaffa Road with the intention of adding to it in stages and providing rooms for immigrants as a public service. He raised money for the construction in America by selling lottery tickets for 20 francs apiece, awarding two grand prizes of 2,000 francs each and other prizes of 1,000, 500, 100, 50, and 20 francs. The tickets depicted the planned three-story building with a fourth-floor attic and fifth-floor gallery, together with pictures of the Four Holy Cities in Jewish tradition—Jerusalem, Hebron, Tiberias and Safed—and a written description of Levy's goals to build a synagogue, study hall and hostel.

Completed in stages from 1908 to 1917, Levy's three-story stone building with attic and gallery was the tallest in Jerusalem for its time. After construction was complete, Levy consecrated the upper floor as the Zoharei Chama (Sunrise) Synagogue for worshippers who prayed at sunrise (vasikin) and also provided a beth midrash called Shoneh Halakhos (literally, "Review of Jewish Laws"). (Note: Metal dedication plaque above sundial.) The Tiferet Zion V'yerushalayim (Glory of Zion and Jerusalem) Hostel on the lower floors accommodated 50 guests. The large sundial was added later to the fourth-story façade.

In 1927 the fifth-floor gallery collapsed during an earthquake. In 1941, an electrical short circuit ignited a fire that spread throughout the building, destroying the gallery and damaging the rest of the building together with the sundial and clocks.

In 1980 the Jerusalem municipality restored the façade and reconstructed the sundial. The Zoharei Chama Synagogue is now the only tenant. While there is only one minyan for Shacharit at sunrise (vasikin), there afternoon and evening prayer services held one after another on the first floor, and early evening prayer services (from Plag Hamincha) conducted on the second floor. While Shacharit (as well as all minyanim on Shabbat) are according to Nusach Ashkenaz, weekday Mincha and Maariv may be prayed according to the chazzan's own custom, and in practice most of these minyanim are according to the Sephardic practice. On weekdays, women are not allowed in the synagogue; on Shabbat, women are allowed to pray in the side room, and on special occasions such as the reading of Shabbat Zachor, the reading of the megillah on Purim and High Holidays, there is an expanded women's section. The building also has a "Shabbat siren" posted on its roof, which alerts residents to the time of lighting Shabbat candles.

== Sundial ==
The vertical sundial on the fourth floor of the building was designed by Rabbi Moshe Shapiro, a watchmaker in Mea Shearim and a self-taught astronomer who had learned the science by studying the pertinent writings of Maimonides and the Vilna Gaon. Shapiro had built sundials for the outside walls of other synagogues, such as the Hurva Synagogue in Jerusalem's Old City, and would go on to build sundials for at least 15 other synagogues in Israel, including Petah Tikva's Great Synagogue.

Sundials were of crucial use for Orthodox synagogue-goers who needed to know the exact time of sunrise to begin their morning prayers (vasikin), the exact time of sunset to complete their afternoon prayers, and the time for lighting Shabbat candles, since these times vary day by day and season by season. Before the Zoharei Chama sundial was erected, Orthodox Jews would climb to the top of the Mount of Olives or the hills of the Bayit Vegan neighborhood each morning and evening to observe the times of sunrise and sunset. The third floor of Levy's building originally included an eastern-facing wooden porch which allowed worshippers to easily see the sunrise.

The Zoharei Chama sundial measures 5 metres (16 ft) in diameter. A horizontal gnomon marks the sun's progress along a half-circle marked at each hour, with sub-markings at 15, 30, and 45 minutes. For cloudy days, Levy installed two mechanical clocks on either side of the sundial, one set for European time and one for local time. Shapiro also designed three sundials for the third floor of the building. Only the large sundial on the fourth floor is still extant.

The sundial was featured on a December 2014 Israeli postage stamp that was part of a three–stamp series titled Sundials in Eretz Israel.
