= Hadassah (dancer) =

Jerusalem-born American dancer, choreographer, and instructor

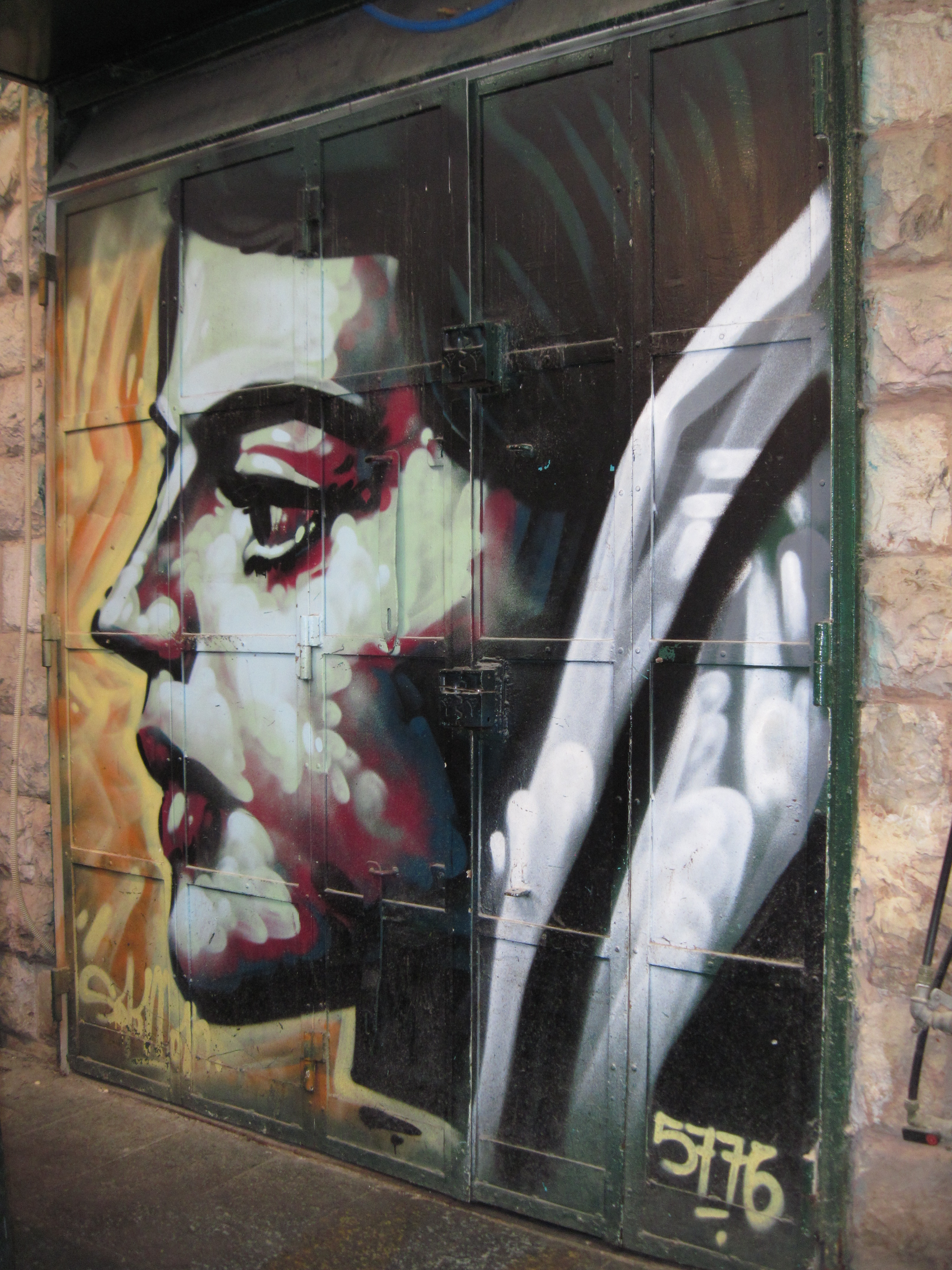
- Spray-paint portrait of Hadassah by Solomon Souza
- Born: Hadassah Spira; December 30, 1909; Jerusalem, Ottoman Palestine
- Died: November 18, 1992 (aged 82); New York City, U.S.
- Occupations: Dancer, choreographer, dance instructor
- Years active: 1938–1988
- Spouse: Milton Epstein
- Dancing career
- Former groups: Kenji Hinoke Japanese Dance Company; Hadassah and Company
- Dances: Classical Indian dance, Javanese dance, Balinese dance, Jewish dance

Hadassah Spira Epstein (December 30, 1909 – November 18, 1992), professional name Hadassah, was a Jerusalem-born American dancer, choreographer, and instructor specializing in Indian, Javanese, Balinese, and Jewish dance. Credited as a pioneer of Indian and Israeli dance in the United States, her choreography reflected both aspects and styles of ethnic and folk culture and her own deeply-held spiritual beliefs. Her signature dance, "Shuvi Nafshi" ("Return O My Soul") (1947) was based on a verse in Psalm 116.

Hadassah began performing in New York City in 1938 and made her professional debut as a solo artist in 1945. She performed through the mid-1970s. She was widely praised for her choreography and performance; an obituary in The New York Times described her as "a performer of special eloquence". She opened her own dance company in 1950. Later she taught many students in the United States, and was a faculty member, board member, and chairperson of the Ethnic Division of the New Dance Group, the largest school of dance in New York.

== Early life ==
Hadassah Spira was born in Jerusalem, Ottoman Palestine, on December 30, 1909. She was the eldest of five children of Rabbi Isaac Spira and Menucha Landau Spira. She had three brothers and a sister. Her ancestors on both sides were rabbis. Her maternal grandfather co-founded the School of Mysticism in Jerusalem, and she herself was "trained in the mysticism of Hasidic Judaism".

From an early age, Spira was interested in chants and dances. She was first exposed to Hebrew chants and cantillation, as well as Hebrew dance, in the context of her family's religious practice; she recalled watching her grandfather dancing with the Torah scroll. She was also exposed to Hindu chants and dances through contact with Indian soldiers in service of the British Mandate. Both she and her father, a hazzan (cantor), were struck by the similarities between Hebrew and Hindu chants. Spira later said: "I came to the conclusion that if the chants of the Hindus and the Hasidic are similar, and if the music is the handmaiden of the dance, Indian dance must be similar to ancient Hebrew dance".

Spira's family was forced to leave Jerusalem due to a misstatement by one of their relatives working in the diplomatic service. The family lived in Vienna and Constantinople during their two-year sojourn, finally reaching the United States in 1924. According to Long, Spira viewed at least one performance of the Denishawn Dancers at Lewisohn Stadium before 1931, and was particularly impressed with Ted Shawn, who was known for his Whirling Dervish. After her marriage in 1933, Spira's husband, Milton Epstein, encouraged her to familiarize herself with New York's theatre and dance culture.

Spira Epstein began studying dance under Ruth St. Denis and Jack Cole, who both incorporated eastern ideas in their works. She also studied with La Meri, founder of the Ethnologic Dance Center of New York, and Nala Najan, the leading Hindu dance scholar in the United States. During the 1939 New York World's Fair, she studied with Javanese dancers who were performing there. She studied dances from the Court of Surakarta and received a teacher's diploma in Javanese dance from Radem Mas Kodrat and Radem Mas Wiradat. She also studied Japanese expressional dance with Kenji Hinoki.

== Career ==
Hadassah decided to use her first name only for her professional career. She was first affiliated with the Kenji Hinoke Japanese Dance Company, with whom she made her New York debut in 1938.

On January 11, 1945, she made her professional debut as a solo artist at New York City's Town Hall with her dance "Golek", described as "a ceremonial court dance of Java". She went on to perform at "Carnegie Hall, the Ziegfeld Theatre, the Brooklyn Academy of Music, many Broadway theaters, every major dance series in New York, the Habibi nightclub and Jacob's Pillow in New England". Hadassah was a featured performer at four Jacob's Pillow Dance Festivals in Becket, Massachusetts, during the 1950s and 1960s. She was credited with introducing Jewish dance to the United States beginning with the first Congress on Jewish Dance in 1949 in New York City.

=== Hadassah and Company ===
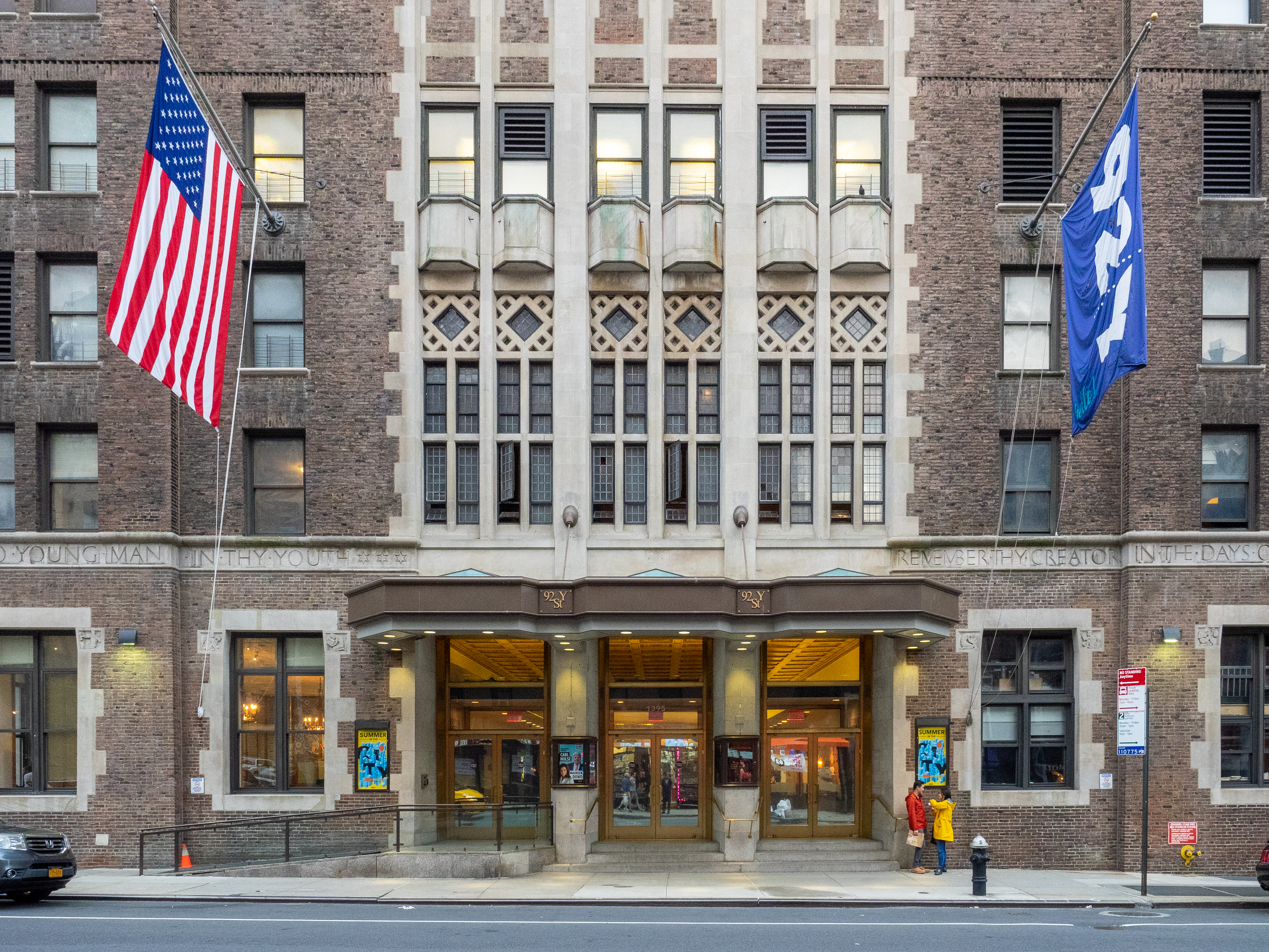
92nd Street Y

Hadassah started her own dance company, Hadassah and Company, which staged its first performance at the 92nd Street Y in Manhattan on June 4, 1950. Hadassah received good notices from critics; John Martin, dance critic for The New York Times, called her an "exceptionally gifted artist...One of the best!" In 1952, she choreographed an "Indonesian Suite" for the company, featuring "a trance section based on Balinese Sanghyang".

Hadassah toured India and Israel in 1959–1960 on a Rockefeller Brothers Fund grant. She expanded her knowledge of classical Indian dance by studying Manipuri dance with Ritha Devi, Kathak with Damayanti Joshi, and Bharatanatyam with Raghavan Nair and Ram Gopal. The celebrated Indian dancer Balasaraswati gave her a private performance of the latter style. Hadassah also undertook research on the Bene Israel and Cochin Jews of India. In Israel, she visited the Druze village of Daliyat al-Karmel to observe "ancient ritual dancing and chanting". She performed on the Tel Aviv stage and before thousands of spectators in the Ein Harod amphitheater. She was asked to stay in Israel to teach dance, but wanted to return to the United States.

Hadassah continued performing into the mid-1970s, displaying almost the same vigor in her senior years as she had in her prime.

== Dance instructor ==
Hadassah taught Indian and Israeli dance at many locations in the United States through the mid-1980s. Her workshops included "classical Hindu, Moroccan, Persian and East Indian folk dance". She served as a faculty member, board member and chairperson of the Ethnic Division of the New Dance Group, the largest school of dance in New York. She also taught students at Dance Masters of America, The Dance Congress, Pennsylvania Association of Dance Teachers, Columbia University Teachers College, Jacob's Pillow, and Henry Street Playhouse. Her classes extended to Jewish community centers and residents at the Menorah Home for the Aged.

== Artistic style ==
Hadassah's dances reflected many aspects and styles of ethnic and folk culture, including Hindu, Indian, Indonesian, Israeli, Balinese, and Korean. At the same time, her choreography expressed her deeply held spiritual beliefs, and what she perceived as a universal desire to connect to God. She specifically incorporated movements and gestures that were common to a variety of cultures to convey "a spiritual longing to connect with and honor the Source". These included the mudra hand gesture from Hindu culture; "a certain movement" which she had seen used by Punjabis, North Indian Muslims, and Dervishes; "an ecstatic Sufi movement"; and the positioning of the hands in Judaism's Priestly Blessing. Her concerts stressed the commonality and continuum of Hindu and Jewish dance forms as she first performed Indian dances and concluded the program with Jewish dances.

In her Jewish interpretative dances, Hadassah freely incorporated traditional religious iconography. For example, her performance of the hora, set to vocals of a cantorial by Cantor Leibele Waldman, saw her garbed in "a stylized version of the four-cornered prayer shawl with fringes (zizit) at each corner".

Combining her Eastern European ancestry with fluency in eastern dance forms, Hadassah projected ambiguity in nationality and ethnicity which defied attempts at categorization. One reviewer for Dance Observer perceived her as an "exotic" who performed Oriental dances, while another viewed her as a modern dancer who elevated "the authentic materials of the east into a contemporary theatre form". During her tours of India and Israel, critics in India referred to Hadassah as "a 'Jewish American' who had a feel for Indian movement, but was at her best when performing Jewish dances"; while critics in Israel depicted her as "an Israeli native returning to her homeland" or as "quintessentially American".

Hadassah rejected her Hasidic upbringing by dancing in public, which is frowned upon by religious Jews. Her rejection of the religious laws "caused her great emotional turmoil". In response to her decision to pursue a career in dance, her father reportedly disowned her. However, one night after she had performed "Shuvi Nafshi", her parents visited her backstage and she felt they understood her need to express her spiritual beliefs through dance.

== Notable works ==
Hadassah's signature dance was "Shuvi Nafshi" ("Return O My Soul"), a composition based on a verse in Psalm 116. The solo dance was performed to the Hebrew words of the verse sung by Cantor Waldman. Hadassah debuted the piece at the 92nd Street Y on February 12, 1947, and performed it many times thereafter. Her final performance of the dance in 1974, honoring the Y's 100th anniversary, was preserved on videotape.

Hadassah explained the meaning of the psalm as follows: "Man is not alone when he is ecstatically aware that his soul, albeit an infinitesimal spark, is part and parcel of the Universal Flame". Walter Terry of the New York Herald Tribune described "Shuvi Nafshi" as "a dance of Biblical power in its projection of ecstatic reverence for the divine...powerful and beautiful, [it] is not only of interest because of its emotional communications but also because of its absorbing fusion of modern dance’s expressional qualities with oriental movement idioms". Marilyn Danitz critiqued "Shuvi Nafshi" as not a purely Jewish dance, but "comprised of hundreds of gestures drawn from numerous religions and a variety of folk forms", including motifs from Hinduism and Indian dance forms.

Hadassah's Broadway Hindu (1949) was a parody of Hindu dances seen in American films and those that were popularly performed to jazz music in nightclubs.

For the centennial celebration of Rabindranath Tagore in 1961, the Tagore Centenary Committee commissioned Hadassah to choreograph the "Tagore Suite", which included a narration of Tagore's poetry by Saeed Jaffrey. After the death of Mahatma Gandhi, Hadassah choreographed "Chant" to Gandhi's favorite hymn, Vaishnava Jana To. For the Gandhi centenary celebration in 1969, Hadassah choreographed Martin Luther King Jr.'s "I Have a Dream" speech as a dance/theatre work, reflecting the influence of Gandhi's philosophy on King.

== Personal life ==
Hadassah married Milton Epstein, a painter and bookstore owner, in New York in October 1933. Besides encouraging her to study Asian dance, Epstein managed Hadassah's career and often lectured at her performances.

Hadassah died from cancer on November 18, 1992, in New York. In 1995, Milton Epstein donated her papers from 1938 to 1988 to the Jerome Robbins Dance Collection at the New York Public Library.

== Sources ==
- Jackson, Naomi M. (2000). Converging Movements: Modern Dance and Jewish Culture at the 92nd Street Y. Wesleyan University Press. ISBN 9780819564207.
- Kirpich, Billie (2014), "Dance has Many Ages", in Friedler, Sharon E.; Glazer, Susan B. (eds.), Dancing Female, Routledge, ISBN 9781134397907
- Rossen, Rebecca (2014). Dancing Jewish: Jewish Identity in American Modern and Postmodern Dance. Oxford University Press. ISBN 9780199791774.
