= Rising Star (Israeli TV series) =

Israeli interactive reality singing competition

- Title card for the eighth and ninth seasons
- Hebrew: הכוכב הבא
- Genre: Reality television
- Created by: Asaf Spector Shenkar; Yoav Tzafir; Avi Nir
- Developed by: Screenz Cross Media
- Presented by: Assi Azar; Esti Ginzburg (season 1); Rotem Sela (season 2–)
- Judges: Rita (season 1); Tzvika Hadar (season 1); Rani Rahav (season 1); Eyal Golan (first half season 1); Mooki (second half season 1–3); Asaf Atedgi (season 2–3); Keren Peles (season 2–); Harel Skaat (season 2–6); Static & Ben El Tavori (season 4–8); Assaf Amdursky (season 4–); Shiri Maimon (season 6–); Itay Levi (season 7–); Ninet Tayeb (season 8–9); Ran Danker (season 9–11); Eden Hason (season 10–12); Osher Cohen (season 13–)
- Theme music composer: Sylas McGriff
- Country of origin: Israel
- No. of seasons: 12

Production
- Running time: 90–120 minutes
- Production companies: Keshet, Tedy Productions

Original release
- Network: Channel 2 (2013–2017); Keshet 12 (2017–present)
- Release: 17 September 2013 – present

Related
- Kokhav Nolad

HaKokhav HaBa (Hebrew: הכוכב הבא, lit. 'The Next Star') is an Israeli interactive reality singing competition, created by Keshet Media Group and broadcast on Channel 2 (from 2013 to 2017) and on Channel 12 (since 2017). It is the basis of the Rising Star franchise. The show is a continuation of Kokhav Nolad (Hebrew: כוכב נולד, lit. 'A Star Is Born') which featured aspiring singers competing for a winning title. The program's format combines the internet, smartphone and television and is filmed live. Between 2015 and 2020, and since 2024, the show has been used to select Israel's representative for the Eurovision Song Contest.

== Format ==
As the season begins, each contestant is asked to perform a well-known song in front of judges. After the song, the judges vote as to whether to transfer the applicant to the next stage, live performances in front of the audience at home. If the judges are not sure about how to vote, the contestant is required to perform another song, and then a decision is made.

Contestants who do move forward must then sing in front of an audience. Viewers then connect with an app at makoTV and decide in real time whether a contestant passes or does not pass.

Judges also influence the test stage by supporting the promotion of the contestant and thereby add 8% percent if there are five judges or 10% if there are four. Once the contestant reaches 70% of votes they "pass" and the screen opens and the contestant goes to the next level. Fourteen singers then move on to a section where the judges and the audience at home vote. At the final stage, four singers are left and one will be elected "The Next Star".

== Hosts and judges ==
Key: Main Guest Contestant

| Season | 1 | 2 | 3 | 4 | 5 | 6 | 7 | 8 | 9 | 10 | 11 | 12 | 13 |
Hosts
| Assi Azar | | | | | | | | | | | | | |
| Esti Ginzburg | | | | | | | | | | | | | |
| Rotem Sela | | | | | | | | | | | | | |
| Yael Goldman | | | | (Note: Only appeared in the audition stage) | | | | | | | | | |
Judges
| Eyal Golan | (Note: Left mid-season) | | | | | | | | | | | | |
| Zvika Hadar | | | | | | | | | | | | | |
| Rita Jahan-Farouz | | | | | | | | | | | | | |
| Rani Rahav | | | | | | | | | | | | | |
| Mooki | (Note: Started mid-season) | | | | | | | | | | | | |
| Asaf Atedgi | | | | | | | | | | | | | |
| Keren Peles | | | | | | | | | | | | | |
| Harel Skaat | | | | | | | | | | | | | |
| Assaf Amdursky | | | | | | | | | | | | | |
| Static & Ben El Tavori | | | | | | | | | | | | | |
| Shiri Maimon | | | | | | | | | | | | | |
| Itay Levi | | | | | | | | | | | | | |
| Ninet Tayeb | | | | | | | | | | | | | |
| Ran Danker | | | | | | | | | | | | | |
| Eden Hason | | | | | | | | | | | | | |
| Osher Cohen | | | | | | | | | | | | | |
Guest judges
| Nadav Guedj | | | | | | | | | | | | | |
| Liran Danino | | | | | | | | | | | | | |
| Izhar Cohen | | | | | | | | | | | | | |
| Gali Atari | | | | | | | | | | | | | |
| Noa Kirel | | | | | | | | | | | | | |
| Miri Mesika | | | | | | | | | | | | | |
| Mergui | | | | | | | | | | | | | |
| Eden Alene | | | | | | | | | | | | | |
| Ella Lee | | | | | | | | | | | | | |
| Narkis Reuven-Nagar | | | | | | | | | | | | | |
| Dudu Aharon | | | | | | | | | | | | | |
| Agam Buhbut | | | | | | | | | | | | | |
| Ness & Stilla | | | | | | | | | | | | | |
| Nasrin Kadri | | | | | | | | | | | | | |
| Dana International | | | | | | | | | | | | | |
| Shay Kerem | | | | | | | | | | | | | |
| Netta Barzilai | | | | | | | | | | | | | |
| Yuval Raphael | | | | | | | | | | | | | |
| Amir Benayoun | | | | | | | | | | | | | |
| Asaf Liberman | | | | | | | | | | | | | |
| Akiva Novick | | | | | | | | | | | | | |
| Noam Bettan | | | | | | | | | | | | | |

== Series overview ==
| Season | Premiere | Finale | Winner | Second place | Third place | Fourth place | Presenter(s) | Judges |
|---|---|---|---|---|---|---|---|---|
| 1 | 17 September 2013 | 25 December 2013 | Evyatar Korkus | Arye & Gil Gat | Tina Ibagrimov | Rinat Cohen | Assi Azar; Esti Ginzburg | Zvika Hadar; Eyal Golan (first half); Rita Jahan-Farouz; Rani Rahav; Mooki (second half) |
| 2 | 9 December 2014 | 17 February 2015 | Nadav Guedj | Iky Levy & The Rasta Hebrew Men | Sari Nachmias | Avia Shoshani | Assi Azar; Rotem Sela | Mooki; Asaf Atedgi; Keren Peles; Harel Skaat |
| 3 | 5 December 2015 | 3 March 2016 | Hovi Star | Nofar Salman | Ella Daniel | Gil Hadash | Assi Azar; Rotem Sela | Mooki; Asaf Atedgi; Keren Peles; Harel Skaat |
| 4 | 2 January 2017 | 13 February 2017 | Imri Ziv | Diana Golbi | Julieta (singer) | Beatbox Element | Assi Azar; Rotem Sela | Keren Peles; Harel Skaat; Assaf Amdursky; Static & Ben-El Tavori |
| 5 | 29 October 2017 | 23 February 2018 | Netta | Mergui | Riki Ben Ari | Chen Aharoni | Assi Azar; Rotem Sela | Keren Peles; Harel Skaat; Assaf Amdursky; Static & Ben-El Tavori |
| 6 | 24 November 2018 | 12 February 2019 | Kobi Marimi | Keteryah | Shefita | Maya Bouskilla | Assi Azar; Rotem Sela | Keren Peles; Harel Skaat; Assaf Amdursky; Static & Ben-El Tavori; Shiri Maimon |
| 7 | 20 November 2019 | 4 February 2020 | Eden Alene | Ella Lee | Orr Amrami Brockman | Gaya Shaki | Assi Azar; Rotem Sela | Keren Peles; Assaf Amdursky; Static & Ben-El Tavori; Shiri Maimon; Itay Levy |
| 8 | 1 June 2021 | 1 September 2021 | Tamir Grinberg | Valerie Hamaty | Matan Levi | Shay Hamber | Assi Azar; Rotem Sela | Keren Peles; Assaf Amdursky; Shiri Maimon; Static & Ben-El Tavori; Itay Levy; Ninet Tayeb |
| 9 | 18 July 2022 | 20 September 2022 | Eliav Zohar | Nofia Yedidia | Meitav Sherman | Libi Panker | Assi Azar; Rotem Sela | Keren Peles; Assaf Amdursky; Shiri Maimon; Itay Levy; Ninet Tayeb; Ran Danker |
| 10 | 20 November 2023 | 6 February 2024 | Eden Golan | Or Cohen | Mika Moshe | Dor Shimon | Assi Azar; Rotem Sela | Keren Peles; Assaf Amdursky; Shiri Maimon; Itay Levy; Ran Danker; Eden Hason |
| 11 | 10 November 2024 | 22 January 2025 | Yuval Raphael | Valerie Hamaty | Red Band & Moran Aharoni | Daniel Wais | Assi Azar; Rotem Sela | Keren Peles; Assaf Amdursky; Shiri Maimon; Itay Levy; Ran Danker; Eden Hason |
| 12 | 11 November 2025 | 20 January 2026 | Noam Bettan | Gal De Paz | Shira Zloof | Alona Erez | Assi Azar; Rotem Sela | Keren Peles; Assaf Amdursky; Shiri Maimon; Itay Levy; Eden Hason |
| 13 | 15 November 2026 | January 2027 | TBD 2027 | | | | Assi Azar; Rotem Sela | Keren Peles; Assaf Amdursky; Shiri Maimon; Itay Levy; Osher Cohen |

=== Season 1 (2013) ===
HaKokhav HaBa 1 Finalists (With dates of elimination)
| Evyatar Korkus | 25 December - Winner |
| Arye & Gil Gat | 25 December |
| Tina Ibagrimov | 25 December |
| Rinat Cohen | 25 December |
| Omer Datz† | 17 December |
| David Drey | 10 December |
| Elias Melayev | 3 December (Quit) |
| Inbal Bekman | 26 November |
| Hen Levy | 26 November |
| Lior Peretz | 19 November |
| Roni Israeli | 17 November |
| Alon Tube | 12 November |
| Dondit Jon | 5 November |
| George Abu Shkara | 3 November |

This first season of Rising Star was hosted by Assi Azar with co-host Esti Ginzburg. The judges were Rita Jahan-Farouz, Zvika Hadar, Mooki and Rani Rahav. Eyal Golan judged the program until his suspension on 20 November 2013, when he was replaced by Mooki.

==== Participants ====
In order:

- George Abu Shakra - 14th place
- Dondit Jon - 13th place
- Alon Tube - 12th place
- Roni Israeli - 11th place
- Lior Peretz - 10th place
- Hen Levy - 9th place
- Inbal Bekman - 8th place
- Elias Melayev - 7th place (Quit)
- David Drey - 6th place
- Omer Datz† - 5th place

==== Finalists ====
- Rinat Cohen - Fourth place
- Tina Ibagrimov - Third place
- Arye & Gil Gat - Second place
- Evyatar Korkus - Winner

Weekly results per contestant
| Contestant | Week 1 | Week 2 | Week 3 | Week 4 | Week 5 | Week 6 | Week 7 | Week 8 | Week 9 | Week 10 |
|---|---|---|---|---|---|---|---|---|---|---|
| Evyatar Korkus | Saved | Safe | Safe | Safe | Safe | Safe | Safe | Safe | Saved | Winner (Week 10) |
| Arye & Gil Gat | Safe | Safe | Safe | Saved | Safe | Safe | Saved | Safe | Safe | Runner-up |
| Tina Ibagrimov | Safe | Safe | Safe | Saved | Safe | Safe | Safe | Safe | Safe | 3rd |
| Rinat Cohen | Safe | Safe | Saved | Saved | Saved | Safe | Saved | Saved | Saved | 4th |
| Omer Datz | Saved | Saved | Safe | Safe | Safe | Saved | Saved | Saved | Eliminated | Eliminated (week 9) |
| David Drey | Saved | Safe | Safe | Safe | Saved | Saved | Saved | Eliminated | Eliminated (week 8) | |
| Elias Melayev | Safe | Saved | Safe | Safe | Safe | Saved | Quit (week 6) | | | |
| Inbal Bekman | Safe | Saved | Safe | Safe | Saved | Eliminated | Eliminated (week 6) | | | |
| Hen Levy | Saved | Saved | Safe | Safe | Eliminated | Eliminated (week 5) | | | | |
| Lior Peretz | Saved | Safe | Safe | Eliminated | Eliminated (week 4) | | | | | |
| Roni Israeli | Safe | Saved | Eliminated | Eliminated (week 3) | | | | | | |
| Alon Tube | Saved | Eliminated | Eliminated (week 2) | | | | | | | |
| Dondit Jon | Eliminated | Eliminated (week 1) | | | | | | | | |
| George Abu Shakra | Eliminated | Eliminated (week 1) | | | | | | | | |

=== Season 2 (2014–15) ===
HaKokhav HaBa 2 Finalists (With dates of elimination)
| Nadav Guedj | 17 February - Winner |
| Iky Levy & The Rasta Hebrew Men | 17 February |
| Sari Nachmias | 17 February |
| Avia Shoshani | 17 February |
| Orit Biansey | 8 February |
| Sa'ar "Rusty" Davidov | 8 February |
| Nava Tehila Walker | 1 February |
| Yifi and Osher Aricha | 27 January |
| Liroz Balas | 25 January |
| Asif Zilberman | 25 January |
| Eva Al Kanrash | 20 January |
| David Maman | 20 January |
| Random Dogs | 20 January |
| Almog Nasawi | 18 January |
| Zadok Garamech | 18 January |
| Evyatar Adir | 18 January |

The winner of season two would represent Israel in the Eurovision Song Contest 2015.

==== Participants ====
In order:

- Evyatar Adir - 16th place
- Zadok Garamech - 15th place
- Almog Nasawi - 14th place
- Random Dogs - 13th place
- David Maman - 12th place
- Eva Al Kanrash - 11th place
- Asif Zilberman - 10th place
- Liroz Balas - 9th place
- Yifi and Osher Aricha - 8th place
- Nava Tehila Walker - 7th place
- Saar "Rusty" Davidov - 6th place
- Orit Biansey - 5th place

==== Finalists ====
- Avia Shoshani - Fourth place
- Sary Nachmias - Third place
- Iky Levy and the Rasta Hebrew Men - Second place
- Nadav Guedj - Winner

=== Season 3 (2015–16) ===
HaKokhav HaBa 3 Finalists (With dates of elimination)
| Hovi Star | 3 March - Winner |
| Nofar Salman | 3 March |
| Ella Daniel | 3 March |
| Gil Hadash | 3 March |
| Kiara Duple (Lior Cohen) | 27 February |
| "Velma" | 27 February |
| Oded Sharavi | 20 February |
| Ofir Haim | 19 February |
| Shtar | 19 February |
| Uriel Aharoni | 13 February |
| Neomi Ezran | 12 February |
| Avi Eliot Alush and Sister Shvakya | 12 February |
| Yoni Grayev | 12 February |
| Sharon Fartouk | 5 February |
| Maya Bernadski | 5 February |
| Alma Kalbermann | 5 February |

The winner of season three would represent Israel in the Eurovision Song Contest 2016.

==== Participants ====
In order:

- Alma Kalbermann - 16th place
- Maya Bernadski - 15th place
- Sharon Fartouk - 14th place
- Yoni Grayev - 13th place
- Avi Eliot Alush and Sister Shvakya - 12th place
- Neomi Ezran - 11th place
- Uriel Aharoni - 10th place
- Shtar - 9th place
- Ofir Haim - 8th place
- Oded Sharavi - 7th place
- "Velma" - 6th place
- Kiara Duple (Lior Cohen) - 5th place

==== Finalists ====
- Gil Hadash – Fourth place
- Ella Daniel - Third place
- Nofar Salman - Second place
- Hovi Star - Winner

=== Season 4 (2017) ===
HaKokhav HaBa 4 Finalists (With dates of elimination)
| Imri | 13 February - Winner |
| Diana Golbi | 13 February |
| Julietta | 13 February |
| Beatbox Element | 13 February |
| Sapir Nahon | 6 February |
| Ta-La-Te | 6 February |
| Halli Lewis | 31 January |
| Yona Shabin | 31 January |

The winner of season four would represent Israel in the Eurovision Song Contest 2017. The show was hosted by Yael Goldman, Assi Azar and Rotem Sela. The presiding judges were Keren Peles and Harel Skaat, who also judged the previous two seasons, joined by new judges Assaf Amdursky and the duo Static and Ben El Tavori.

==== Participants ====
In order:

- Yona Shabin - 8th place
- Hally Lewis - 7th place
- Ta-La-Te - 6th place
- Sapir Nahon - 5th place

==== Finalists ====
- Beatbox Element - Fourth place
- Julieta - Third place
- Diana Golbi - Second place
- Imri - Winner

=== Season 5 (2017–18) ===
HaKokhav HaBa 5 Finalists (With dates of elimination)
| Netta Barzilai | 13 February - Winner |
| Mergui | 13 February |
| Riki Ben Ari | 13 February |
| Chen Aharoni | 13 February |
| Eden Meiri | 11 February |
| Howie Danao | 11 February |
| Ravit Batashvili | 7 February |
| Adava Omer | 7 February |
| José Steinberg | 29 January |
| Shay & Gilad | 22 January |
| Sarit Hativa | 21 January |
| Rinat Bar | 14 January (Quit) |
| Gal Yaakobi | 8 January |
| Jaki Gaforov | 8 January |
| Shir Gadasi | 7 January |
| The Choice | 7 January |
| Shir Baruch | 7 January |
| Ofir Harush | 4 January |
| Tal Mizrahi | 4 January |
| Axum | 4 January |

The Israeli Public Broadcasting Corporation (IPBC/Kan) succeeded the Israel Broadcasting Authority (IBA) in 2017, and thus took charge of Israel's participation in the Eurovision Song Contest starting in 2018. Kan continued the IBA's collaboration with Keshet and Tedy Productions to use HaKokhav HaBa to select the singer to represent Israel, while the song was chosen by a committee appointed by Kan. The season was won by Netta Barzilai, the first woman to win the series. She represented Israel in the Eurovision Song Contest 2018, winning it with the song "Toy".

==== Participants ====
In order:

- Axum - 20th place
- Tal Mizrahi - 19th place
- Ofir Harush - 18th place
- Shir Baruch - 17th place
- The Choice - 16th place
- Shir Gadasi - 15th place
- Jaki Gaforov - 14th place
- Gal Yaakobi - 13th place
- Rinat Bar (Quit) - 12th place
- Sarit Hativa - 11th place
- Shay & Gilad - 10th place
- José Steinberg - 9th place
- Adava Omer - 8th place
- Ravit Batashvili - 7th place
- Howie Danao - 6th place
- Eden Meiri - 5th place

==== Finalists ====
- Chen Aharoni – Fourth place
- Riki Ben Ari - Third place
- Mergui - Second place
- Netta Barzilai - Winner

=== Season 6 (2018–19) ===
HaKokhav HaBa 6 Finalists (With dates of elimination)
| Kobi Marimi | 28 January (Rejoined on 7 February), 12 February - Winner |
| Ketreyah | 12 February |
| Shefita | 12 February |
| Maya Bouskilla | 12 February |
| Avraham de Carvalho | 9 February |
| Daniel Barzilay | 9 February |
| Shalva Band | 5 February (withdrew) |
| Ofri Calfon | 3 February |
| Tai† | 2 February |
| Danielle Mazuz | 26 January |
| Osher Biton | 21 January |
| Klara Sabag | 19 January |
| Naor Cohen | 15 January |
| Nave Madmon | 15 January |
| Nitay Twito | 15 January |
| Liat Eliyahu | 14 January |
| Naama Gali Cohen | 14 January |
| Lior Chen | 13 January |
| Shachaf | 13 January |
| Wanna Wanna | 13 January |

Kobi Marimi won the show with 383 points, beating runner-up Keteryah and third-placer Shefita. Marimi represented Israel in the Eurovision Song Contest 2019 on home soil in Tel Aviv with the song "Home", which was internally selected by Kan.

==== Participants ====
In order:

- Wanna Wanna - 20th place
- Shachaf - 19th place
- Lior Chen - 18th place
- Naama Gali Cohen - 17th place
- Liat Eliyahu - 16th place
- Nitay Twito - 15th place
- Nave Madmon - 14th place
- Naor Cohen - 13th place
- Klara Sabag - 12th place
- Osher Biton - 11th place
- Danielle Mazuz - 10th place
- Tai† - 9th place
- Ofri Calfon - 8th place
- Daniel Barzilay - 7th place
- Avraham de Carvalho - 6th place

==== Finalists ====
- Shalva Band – Fifth place; withdrew
- Maya Bouskilla – Fourth place
- Shefita - Third place
- Ketreyah - Second place
- Kobi Marimi - Winner

=== Season 7 (2019–20) ===
HaKokhav HaBa 7 Finalists (With dates of elimination)
| Eden Alene | 4 February - Winner |
| Ella Lee | 4 February |
| Orr Amrami Brockman | 4 February |
| Gaya Shaki | 4 February |
| Raviv Kaner | 2 February |
| Moran Aharoni | 2 February |
| Lali Kolishkin | 1 February |
| Ohad Shragai | 1 February |
| Loai Ali | 30 January |
| Eden Zohar Sivan | 27 January |
| Dorel Saadon | 25 January |
| Omer Eliyahu | 20 January |
| Avihu Pinhasov Rhythm Club | 18 January |
| Nicki Goldstein | 13 January |
| Linoy Akala and Gil Shapira | 11 January |
| HaTavlinim | 11 January |
| Oneg Israel | 9 January |
| Dana Lappidot | 5 January |
| Nathan Katorza | 4 January |
| Or Eddie | 4 January |

The seventh season premiered on 20 November 2019 and concluded on 4 February 2020. The winner was Eden Alene, and a separate televised competition was held by Kan to select her Eurovision Song Contest 2020 entry, "Feker Libi". However, that year's Eurovision was cancelled due to the COVID-19 pandemic, and Alene was internally re-selected by Kan to compete in the Eurovision Song Contest 2021, with another competition held to select her 2021 entry, "Set Me Free".

==== Participants ====
In order:

- Or Eddie - 20th place
- Nathan Katorza - 19th place
- Dana Lappidot - 18th place
- Oneg Israel - 17th place
- HaTavlinim - 16th place
- Linoy Akala and Gil Shapira - 15th place
- Nicki Goldstein - 14th place
- Avihu Pinhasov Rhythm Club - 13th place
- Omer Eliyahu - 12th place
- Dorel Saadon - 11th place
- Eden Zohar Sivan - 10th place
- Loai Ali - 9th place
- Ohad Shragai - 8th place
- Lali Kolishkin - 7th place
- Moran Aharoni - 6th place
- Raviv Kaner - 5th place

==== Finalists ====
- Gaya Shaki - Fourth place
- Orr Amrami Brockman - Third place
- Ella Lee - Second place
- Eden Alene - Winner

=== Season 8 (2021) ===
HaKokhav HaBa 8 Finalists (With dates of elimination)
| Tamir Grinberg | 1 September - Winner |
| Valerie Hamaty | 1 September |
| Matan Levi | 1 September |
| Shay Hamber | 1 September |
| Anael Moshe | 29 August |
| Sahar Twito | 29 August |
| Dorin Hirvy | 26 August |
| Tamar Azran | 26 August |
| Lia Shaked | 24 August |
| Maayan Bukris | 22 August |
| Adar Kagan | 17 August |
| Mira Semenduev | 15 August |
| Noa Yosefian | 10 August |
| Yotal Guez | 10 August |
| David Meir Ziton | 10 August |
| Orit Shalom | 3 August |
| Ella Lavie | 1 August |
| Ofri Tal | 1 August |
| Niv Shaked | 1 August |
| Naor Ormia | 1 August |
| Matan Agami | 26 July |
| Shalev Edri | 24 July |

For this season, the show was not used to select the Israeli representative for the Eurovision Song Contest 2022 (The X Factor Israel received this role instead). Instead, the grand prize for the winner is one million shekels for starting his career, similar to season 1. The cast of hosts and judges remained the same as the previous season, with Ninet Tayeb joining the judges as well.

==== Participants ====
In order:

- Shalev Edri - 22nd place
- Matan Agami - 21st place
- Naor Ormia - 20th place
- Niv Shaked - 19th place
- Ofri Tal - 18th place
- Ella Lavie - 17th place
- Orit Shalom - 16th place
- David Meir Ziton - 15th place
- Yotal Guez - 14th place
- Noa Yosefian - 13th place
- Mira Semenduev - 12th place
- Adar Kagan - 11th place
- Maayan Bukris - 10th place
- Lia Shaked - 9th place
- Tamar Azran - 8th place
- Dorin Hirvy - 7th place
- Sahar Twito - 6th place
- Anael Moshe - 5th place

==== Finalists ====
- Shay Hamber - Fourth place
- Matan Levi - Third place
- Valerie Hamaty - Second place
- Tamir Grinberg - Winner

Weekly results per contestant
| Contestant | Week 1 | Week 2 | Week 3 | Week 4 | Week 5 | Week 6 | Week 7 |
|---|---|---|---|---|---|---|---|
| Tamir Grinberg | Safe | Safe | Safe | Saved | Safe | Safe | Winner (Week 7) |
| Valerie Hamaty | Safe | Safe | Safe | Saved | Safe | Safe | Runner-up |
| Matan Levi | Safe | Saved | Safe | Safe | Safe | Safe | 3rd |
| Shay Hamber | Saved | Safe | Safe | Safe | Safe | Safe | 4th |
| Anael Moshe | Safe | Saved | Safe | Safe | Safe | Eliminated | Eliminated (week 6) |
| Sahar Twito | Safe | Saved | Safe | Safe | Safe | Eliminated | Eliminated (week 6) |
| Dorin Hirvi | Safe | Saved | Saved | Safe | Safe | Eliminated | Eliminated (week 6) |
| Tamar Azran | Safe | Saved | Saved | Safe | Safe | Eliminated | Eliminated (week 6) |
| Lia Shaked | Saved | Safe | Safe | Safe | Eliminated | Eliminated (week 5) | |
| Maayan Bukris | Safe | Safe | Safe | Safe | Eliminated | Eliminated (week 5) | |
| Adar Kagan | Safe | Safe | Safe | Eliminated | Eliminated (week 4) | | |
| Mira Semenduev | Saved | Safe | Safe | Eliminated | Eliminated (week 4) | | |
| Noa Yosefian | Safe | Safe | Eliminated | Eliminated (week 3) | | | |
| Yotal Guez | Safe | Saved | Eliminated | Eliminated (week 3) | | | |
| David Meir Ziton | Saved | Saved | Eliminated | Eliminated (week 3) | | | |
| Orit Shalom | Saved | Eliminated | Eliminated (week 2) | | | | |
| Ella Lavie | Eliminated | Eliminated (week 1) | | | | | |
| Ofri Tal | Eliminated | Eliminated (week 1) | | | | | |
| Niv Shaked | Eliminated | Eliminated (week 1) | | | | | |
| Naor Ormia | Eliminated | Eliminated (week 1) | | | | | |
| Matan Agami | Eliminated | Eliminated (week 1) | | | | | |
| Shalev Edri | Eliminated | Eliminated (week 1) | | | | | |

=== Season 9 (2022) ===
HaKokhav HaBa 9 Finalists (With dates of elimination)
| Eliav Zohar | 20 September - Winner |
| Nofia Yedidia | 20 September |
| Meitav Sherman | 20 September |
| Libi Panker | 20 September |
| Yanai Ben Hamo | 18 September |
| Niv Demirel | 18 September |
| Yahalom David | 13 September |
| Karmi Glasner | 13 September |
| Omer Yefet | 12 September |
| Yam Gronich | 10 September |
| Zohar Yaacobi | 7 September |
| Talia Sol Azarzar | 6 September |
| Kfir Tsafrir | 5 September |
| Shalom Sabag | 4 September |
| Nevo Alon | 1 September |
| Michael Levi | 1 September |
| Shiri Oren | 30 August |
| Eilon Shaltiel | 30 August |

On February 17, 2022, Static & Ben El Tavori retired from the show and Ran Danker replaced them. The ninth season began on 18 July 2022 and concluded on 20 September.

==== Participants ====
In order:

- Eilon Shaltiel - 18th place
- Shiri Oren - 17th place
- Nevo Alon - 15th/16th place
- Michael Levi - 15th/16th place
- Shalom Sabag - 14th place
- Kfir Tsafrir - 13th place
- Talia Sol Azarzar - 12th place
- Zohar Yaacobi - 11th place
- Yam Gronich - 10th place
- Omer Yefet - 9th place
- Karmi Glasner - 8th place
- Yahalom David - 7th place
- Niv Demirel - 6th place
- Yanai Ben Hamo - 5th place

==== Finalists ====
- Libi Panker - Fourth place
- Meitav Sherman - Third place
- Nofia Yedidia - Second place
- Eliav Zohar - Winner

Weekly results per contestant
| Contestant | Week 1 | Week 2 | Week 3 | Week 4 | Week 5 | Week 6 | Week 7 |
|---|---|---|---|---|---|---|---|
| Eliav Zohar | Saved | Safe | Safe | Safe | Safe | Safe | Winner (Week 7) |
| Nofia Yedidia | Saved | Safe | Safe | Safe | Safe | Safe | Runner-up |
| Meitav Sherman | Saved | Saved | Safe | Safe | Safe | Safe | 3rd |
| Libi Panker | Safe | Saved | Safe | Safe | Safe | Safe | 4th |
| Yanai Ben Hamo | Safe | Safe | Safe | Safe | Safe | Eliminated | Eliminated (week 6) |
| Niv Demirel | Safe | Safe | Safe | Saved | Safe | Eliminated | Eliminated (week 6) |
| Yahalom David | Saved | Saved | Safe | Safe | Safe | Eliminated | Eliminated (week 6) |
| Karmi Glasner | Safe | Safe | Safe | Safe | Safe | Eliminated | Eliminated (week 6) |
| Omer Yefet | Saved | Safe | Safe | Saved | Eliminated | Eliminated (week 5) | |
| Yam Gronich | Safe | Saved | Safe | Safe | Eliminated | Eliminated (week 5) | |
| Zohar Yaacobi | Safe | Safe | Safe | Eliminated | Eliminated (week 4) | | |
| Talia Sol Azarzar | Safe | Safe | Safe | Eliminated | Eliminated (week 4) | | |
| Kfir Tsafrir | Safe | Saved | Eliminated | Eliminated (week 3) | | | |
| Shalom Sabag | Saved | Saved | Eliminated | Eliminated (week 3) | | | |
| Nevo Alon | Saved | Eliminated | Eliminated (week 2) | | | | |
| Michael Levi | Safe | Eliminated | Eliminated (week 2) | | | | |
| Shiri Oren | Eliminated | Eliminated (week 1) | | | | | |
| Eilon Shaltiel | Eliminated | Eliminated (week 1) | | | | | |

=== Season 10 (2023–24) ===
HaKokhav HaBa 10 Finalists (With dates of elimination)
| Eden Golan | 6 February - Winner |
| Or Cohen | 6 February |
| Mika Moshe | 6 February |
| Dor Shimon | 6 February |
| Shai Tamino | 1 February |
| Lian Biran | 28 January |
| Arik Sinai | 25 January |
| Orel Ravid | 22 January |
| Jonathan Bitton | 21 January |
| Moria Angel | 17 January |
| Ido Bartal | 14 January |
| Mika Kertis | 10 January |
| Yehuda Saado | 7 January |
| Gal Kafri | 3 January |

The tenth season premiered on 20 November 2023 and concluded on 6 February 2024. Its format was scaled down due to the Gaza war, which began before production started and caused the season premiere to be postponed. The winner was Eden Golan, who represented Israel in the Eurovision Song Contest 2024 with the song "Hurricane", which was internally selected by Kan.

==== Participants ====
- Gal Kafri - 14th place
- Yehuda Saado - 13th place
- Mika Kertis - 12th place
- Ido Bartal - 11th place
- Moria Angel - 10th place
- Jonathan Bitton - 9th place
- Orel Ravid - 8th place
- Arik Sinai - 7th place
- Lian Biran - 6th place
- Shai Tamino - 5th place

==== Finalists ====
- Dor Shimon - 4th place
- Mika Moshe - 3rd place
- Or Cohen - 2nd place
- Eden Golan - Winner

=== Season 11 (2024–25) ===
The eleventh season premiered on 10 November 2024 and concluded on 22 January 2025. The winner was Yuval Raphael, who represented Israel in the Eurovision Song Contest 2025 with the song "New Day Will Rise", which was internally selected by Kan.

HaKokhav HaBa 11 Finalists (With dates of elimination)
| Yuval Raphael | 22 January - Winner |
| Valerie Hamaty | 22 January |
| Red Band & Moran Aharoni | 22 January |
| Daniel Wais | 22 January |
| Dolev Mendelbaum | 18 January |
| Yuval Gold | 14 January |
| Ido Malka | 12 January |
| Amit Sade | 12 January |
| Nati Livian | 11 January |
| Udi Schneider | 7 January |
| Alma Maimon de Razon | 5 January |
| Natalie Zafar | 2 January |
| Ilay Avidani | 31 December |
| Itay Paz | 29 December |
| Aviad Klein | 28 December |
| Kler | 26 December |
| Perfylove Mongoza | 26 December |
| Ori Saban | 21 December |
| Shira Knopp | 17 December |
| Hamsa | 15 December |
| Renana Boaziza | 14 December |

==== Participants ====
- Renana Boaziza - 21st place
- Hamsa - 20th place
- Shira Knopp - 19th place
- Ori Saban - 18th place
- Perfylove Mongoza - 17th place
- Kler - 16th place
- Aviad Klein - 15th place
- Itay Paz - 14th place
- Ilay Avidani - 13th place
- Natalie Zafar - 12th place
- Alma Maimon de Razon - 11th place
- Udi Schneider - 10th place
- Nati Livian - 9th place
- Amit Sade - 8th place
- Ido Malka - 7th place
- Yuval Gold - 6th place
- Dolev Mendelbaum - 5th place

==== Finalists ====
- Daniel Wais - 4th place
- Red Band & Moran Aharoni - 3rd place
- Valerie Hamaty - 2nd place
- Yuval Raphael - Winner

=== Season 12 (2025–26) ===
HaKokhav HaBa 12 Finalists (With dates of elimination)
| Noam Bettan | 20 January - Winner |
| Gal De Paz | 20 January |
| Shira Zloof | 20 January |
| Alona Erez | 20 January |
| Shaked Solomon | 17 January |
| Michael HarPaz | 15 January |
| Nave Levi | 13 January |
| Agam Hazan | 11 January |
| Tamir Levy | 10 January |
| Dorin Or | 7 January |
| Eitan Aharon | 6 January |
| Elior Shemesh | 4 January |
| Daniel Azar | 3 January |
| Portrait | 30 December |
| Gilly Tsanaani | 28 December |
| Stav Vaknin | 27 December |
| Shaya Avitan | 23 December |
| Mentamer Taganya | 22 December |
| Ori Berko | 20 December |
| Daniel Shevtsov | 16 December |
| Saar Hadar | 13 December |

The twelfth season premiered on 11 November 2025 and concluded on 20 January 2026. Ran Danker left the show after three seasons, and his seat was filled by a rotating panel of several guest judges in the audition phase. Their votes did not count towards the result unless a main judge was absent from a performance. In the last two episodes, Asaf Liberman and Akiva Novick joined the judging panel, where they shared one vote. The winner was Noam Bettan, who represented Israel in the Eurovision Song Contest 2026 with the song "Michelle", which was internally selected by Kan.

==== Participants ====
- Saar Hadar - 21st place
- Daniel Shevtsov - 20th place
- Ori Berko - 19th place
- Mentamer Taganya - 18th place
- Shaya Avitan - 17th place
- Stav Vaknin - 16th place
- Gilly Tsanaani - 15th place
- Portrait - 14th place
- Daniel Azar - 13th place
- Elior Shemesh - 12th place
- Eitan Aharon - 11th place
- Dorin Or - 10th place
- Tamir Levy - 9th place
- Agam Hazan - 8th place
- Nave Levi - 7th place
- Michael HarPaz - 6th place
- Shaked Solomon - 5th place

==== Finalists ====
- Alona Erez - 4th place
- Shira Zloof - 3rd place
- Gal De Paz - 2nd place
- Noam Bettan - Winner

=== Season 13 (2026–27) ===
The thirteenth season premiered on 15 November 2026. The winner will represent Israel in the Eurovision Song Contest 2027, with their song internally selected by Kan. A change in the scoring method is implemented for this season, with judges giving out scores of 4, 6, 8, 10, and 12 to each contestant, inspired by the score system in Eurovision, instead of giving up or down votes in previous seasons.

== Eurovision Song Contest results ==
| Season | Year | Song | Artist | Final | Points | Semi | Points |
|---|---|---|---|---|---|---|---|
| 2 | 2015 | "Golden Boy" | Nadav Guedj | 9 | 97 | 3 | 151 |
| 3 | 2016 | "Made of Stars" | Hovi Star | 14 | 135 | 7 | 147 |
| 4 | 2017 | "I Feel Alive" | Imri | 23 | 39 | 3 | 207 |
| 5 | 2018 | "Toy" | Netta | 1 | 529 | 1 | 283 |
| 6 | 2019 | "Home" | Kobi Marimi | 23 | 35 | Host country | |
| 7 | 2020 | "Feker Libi" (ፍቅር ልቤ) | Eden Alene | Contest cancelled due to the COVID-19 pandemic | | | |
| 10 | 2024 | "Hurricane" | Eden Golan | 5 | 375 | 1 | 194 |
| 11 | 2025 | "New Day Will Rise" | Yuval Raphael | 2 | 357 | 1 | 203 |
| 12 | 2026 | "Michelle" | Noam Bettan | 2 | 343 | 1 | 269 |
| 13 | 2027 | TBD 2027 | | | | | |

== International versions ==
After the success of the Israeli series in 2013, many television stations throughout the world bought the rights and started broadcasting similar series.

The American television network ABC began airing its first series of Rising Star in June 2014 from Los Angeles. The US edition was also carried in Canada, with advertising simultaneous substitution and voting access on CTV. The show was canceled after its full 10-episode season due to low ratings in its target demographic, and extremely low ratings on the German and French versions.

Another major broadcaster RTL Television launched a German language version in Germany. But following reported poor ratings on its early shows, it announced it was bringing Rising Star Germany scheduled final forward airing an extended one-day finale between 20.15 and 00.00 to decide the winning performer, rather than completing the full 10-episode scheduled season originally planned.

The UK ITV channel bought the rights, but canceled its scheduled launch citing lower-than-expected viewership in similar launches in the United States and Germany. Canale 5 also bought the rights to an Italian version of the show, which was also canceled during development for unexplained reasons.

French television M6, with its first season, launched in September 2014 keeping the title Rising Star. The French version had a shortened season due to low ratings. The Italian television Canale 5 launched its version as Rising Star.

Other broadcasters that adapted the series include Argentine Telefe as Elegidos (La música en tus manos), Brazilian Rede Globo as SuperStar, Chinese CCTV-3, Greek ANT1, Hungarian TV2 as Rising Star, Indonesian RCTI as Rising Star Indonesia (later, MNCTV as sister channel of RCTI make dangdut version of this show entitled Rising Star Indonesia Dangdut), Portuguese Televisão Independente (TVI) as Rising Star: A próxima estrela, Russia-1 as Артист (Artist), and Turkish TV8 as Yükselen Yıldız. The Russian version of the show had a shortened season due to low ratings on the French and German versions, while the Portuguese and Brazilian versions became quickly popular, but neither lasted more than three seasons; the Brazilian version ended in 2016 after three seasons due to declining viewership. The Indonesian version is the longest-running version of the show outside of Israel.

== See also ==
- Kokhav Nolad
