= Katan Aleinu =

Israeli charity song

Song by Static & Ben El Tavori, Noa Kirel, Gidi Gov, Omer Adam, Eden Ben Zaken and others
- Language: Hebrew
- Released: November 24, 2020
- Length: 5:24
- Songwriter(s): Static
- Producer(s): Yarden 'Jordi' Peleg

Katan Aleinu (קטן עלינו) is a charity single written and composed by Israeli singer Static (one half of pop duo Static & Ben El Tavori) and his producer Yarden 'Jordi' Peleg. The song features 40 Israeli singers and was written and recorded in response to the 2019–2021 COVID-19 pandemic. Every share of the video was "matched" with donations to Israeli hospitals and medical staff. The song was released on November 24, 2020.

== Background and writing ==
Static and Jordi worked on the song for months and recording took place over three days. The song's title literally translates as "this is small for us," a popular Israeli adage more accurately meaning "we got this." The theme of the song is that Israel has gotten through other challenges and will likewise get through the pandemic. As of February 2024, the official music video had more than 27 million views on YouTube.

In December 2023, Static and singer Agam Buhbut, who both participated in the original version, released a new version of the song entitled "יחד תמיד," or "Always Together." The song was released in partnership with the Israel Defense Forces and features Buhbut, who is a band member in the Education and Youth Corps, and Static, who is a reservist, both in uniform. The song was intended to support Israel during the 2023 Gaza war and features a rap breakdown highlighting work done by female soldiers.

== Participating artists ==
Forty Israeli artists appeared on the track, including many who had competed on and/or won Eurovision Song Contests and reality singing shows The X Factor Israel and Kokhav Nolad. All artists volunteered their time for the project.

- Noa Kirel
- Gidi Gov
- Omer Adam
- Eden Ben Zaken
- Jasmin Moallem
- Eden Alene
- Roni Dalumi
- Lior Narkis
- Static & Ben El Tavori
- Anna Zak
- Mooki
- Eliad Nachum
- Nasreen Qadri
- Dudu Aharon
- Rami Kleinstein
- Gali Atari
- Eden Hason
- Ella-Lee Lahav
- Moshe Peretz
- Stephane Legar
- Subliminal

== See also ==
- Music of Israel

== Links ==
- Official Music Video
