= Mako Hitlist =

Israeli music chart

Logo of the Mako Hitlist

Mako Hitlist (Hebrew: היטליסט) is an Israeli weekly record chart launched by news website Mako in 2023. It is the first Israeli music chart to determine its ranking based on data from digital platforms such as YouTube, Spotify, Apple Music, rather than on editorial choice, or fan votes like Galgalatz. The first number 1 hit featured was "Unicorn" by Noa Kirel, the Israeli entry in the Eurovision Song Contest 2023.

The first annual Hitlist chart was aired on 14 September 2023 on Keshet 12 and Radio Tel Aviv. The highest ranking on the chart was the song "Sick Love" by Pe'er Tasi. The annual chart is scheduled for September rather than December due to the proximity of Rosh Hashanah, the Jewish New Year, which typically does not fall in December.

== Background ==
Mako announced the chart on 20 March 2023, According to Mako, the chart was created as an alternative to existing Israeli record charts, which rely on fan votes and editorial choices. It aims to "represent the true Israeli charts through the development of a unique algorithm that gauges the preferences of hundreds of thousands of Israelis who listen to songs daily on various platforms." The chart was launched with the sponsorship of the Coca-Cola mobile app.

The chart is updated every Tuesday at 14:00 on the Mako website. It includes the main chart, consisting of the top 100 songs listened to by Israelis on various platforms, as well as separate charts for Israeli and international songs, each including the songs that entered the top 100 from each category. Every Israeli artist whose song hits the first position receives a personal plaque from Mako in recognition of the achievement.

== Number ones ==
Issue date	Top 100		Israeli		International	
	song	Artist	song	Artist	song	Artist
2023
4 April	"Unicorn"	Noa Kirel	"Unicorn"	Noa Kirel	"Flowers"	Miley Cyrus
11 April	"Unicorn"	Noa Kirel	"Unicorn"	Noa Kirel	"Flowers"	Miley Cyrus
18 April	"Unicorn"	Noa Kirel	"Unicorn"	Noa Kirel	"Flowers"	Miley Cyrus
25 April	"Sick Love"	Peer Tasi	"Sick Love"	Peer Tasi	"Flowers"	Miley Cyrus
2 May	"Sick Love"	Peer Tasi	"Sick Love"	Peer Tasi	"Flowers"	Miley Cyrus
9 May	"A Little Bag" ("Tik Katan")	Ness and Stilla	"A Little Bag" ("Tik Katan")	Ness and Stilla	"Flowers"	Miley Cyrus
16 May	"Unicorn"	Noa Kirel	"Unicorn"	Noa Kirel	"Flowers"	Miley Cyrus
23 May	"Unicorn"	Noa Kirel	"Unicorn"	Noa Kirel	"Queen of Kings"	Alessandra Mele
30 May	"A Little Bag" ("Tik Katan")	Ness and Stilla	"A Little Bag" ("Tik Katan")	Ness and Stilla	"Queen of Kings"	Alessandra Mele
6 June	"A Little Bag" ("Tik Katan")	Ness and Stilla	"A Little Bag" ("Tik Katan")	Ness and Stilla	"Queen of Kings"	Alessandra Mele
13 June	"A Little Bag" ("Tik Katan")	Ness and Stilla	"A Little Bag" ("Tik Katan")	Ness and Stilla	"Queen of Kings"	Alessandra Mele
20 June	"A Little Bag" ("Tik Katan")	Ness and Stilla	"A Little Bag" ("Tik Katan")	Ness and Stilla	"Tattoo"	Loreen
27 June	"A Little Bag" ("Tik Katan")	Ness and Stilla	"A Little Bag" ("Tik Katan")	Ness and Stilla	"Tattoo"	Loreen
4 July	"A Little Bag" ("Tik Katan")	Ness and Stilla	"A Little Bag" ("Tik Katan")	Ness and Stilla	"Tattoo"	Loreen
11 July	"Loving You Every Day"	Eden Hason and Doli & Penn	"Loving You Every Day"	Eden Hason and Doli & Penn	"Sprinter"	Dave and Central Cee
18 July	"Loving You Every Day"	Eden Hason and Doli & Penn	"Loving You Every Day"	Eden Hason and Doli & Penn	"Sprinter"	Dave and Central Cee
25 July	"Loving You Every Day"	Eden Hason and Doli & Penn	"Loving You Every Day"	Eden Hason and Doli & Penn	"Sprinter"	Dave and Central Cee
1 August	"Love"	Osher Cohen	"Love"	Osher Cohen	"Sprinter"	Dave and Central Cee
8 August	"Love"	Osher Cohen	"Love"	Osher Cohen	"Sprinter"	Dave and Central Cee
15 August	"Love"	Osher Cohen	"Love"	Osher Cohen	"Sprinter"	Dave and Central Cee
22 August	"Love"	Osher Cohen	"Love"	Osher Cohen	"Sprinter"	Dave and Central Cee
29 August	"Love"	Osher Cohen	"Love"	Osher Cohen	"Sprinter"	Dave and Central Cee
5 September	"Love"	Osher Cohen	"Love"	Osher Cohen	"Sprinter"	Dave and Central Cee
12 September	"Love"	Osher Cohen	"Love"	Osher Cohen	"Paint the Town Red"	Doja Cat
19 September	"Love"	Osher Cohen	"Love"	Osher Cohen	"Paint the Town Red"	Doja Cat
26 September	"Love"	Osher Cohen	"Love"	Osher Cohen	"Paint the Town Red"	Doja Cat
3 October	"Love"	Osher Cohen	"Love"	Osher Cohen	"Paint the Town Red"	Doja Cat
10 October	"Love"	Osher Cohen	"Love"	Osher Cohen	"Paint the Town Red"	Doja Cat
17 October	"Love"	Osher Cohen	"Love"	Osher Cohen	"Greedy"	Tate McRae
24 October	"It Will Be Better" and "Silent Water" Mashup	Jasmin Moallem and Omer Adam	"it Will Be Better" and "Silent Water" Mashup	Jasmin Moallem and Omer Adam	"Si No Estás"	Iñigo Quintero
31 October	"It Will Be Better" and "Silent Water" Mashup	Jasmin Moallem and Omer Adam	"it Will Be Better" and "Silent Water" Mashup	Jasmin Moallem and Omer Adam	"Si No Estás"	Iñigo Quintero
7 November	"Getting Out of Depression"	Yagel Oshri	"Getting Out of Depression"	Yagel Oshri	"Si No Estás"	Iñigo Quintero
14 November	"Getting Out of Depression"	Yagel Oshri	"Getting Out of Depression"	Yagel Oshri	"Si No Estás"	Iñigo Quintero
21 November	"Getting Out of Depression"	Yagel Oshri	"Getting Out of Depression"	Yagel Oshri	"Si No Estás"	Iñigo Quintero
28 November	"Harbu Darbu"	Ness and Stilla	"Harbu Darbu"	Ness and Stilla	"Si No Estás"	Iñigo Quintero
5 December	"Harbu Darbu"	Ness and Stilla	"Harbu Darbu"	Ness and Stilla	"Si No Estás"	Iñigo Quintero
12 December	"Harbu Darbu"	Ness and Stilla	"Harbu Darbu"	Ness and Stilla	"Greedy"	Tate McRae
19 December	"Harbu Darbu"	Ness and Stilla	"Harbu Darbu"	Ness and Stilla	"Greedy"	Tate McRae
26 December	"Harbu Darbu"	Ness and Stilla	"Harbu Darbu"	Ness and Stilla	"Greedy"	Tate McRae
2024
2 January	"Pahad Elohim"	Kfir Tsafrir	"Pahad Elohim"	Kfir Tsafrir	"Greedy"	Tate McRae
9 January	"Pahad Elohim"	Kfir Tsafrir	"Pahad Elohim"	Kfir Tsafrir	"Greedy"	Tate McRae
16 January	"Pahad Elohim"	Kfir Tsafrir	"Pahad Elohim"	Kfir Tsafrir	"Greedy"	Tate McRae
23 January	"Pahad Elohim"	Kfir Tsafrir	"Pahad Elohim"	Kfir Tsafrir	"Yes, And?"	Ariana Grande
30 January	"Pahad Elohim"	Kfir Tsafrir	"Pahad Elohim"	Kfir Tsafrir	"Greedy"	Tate McRae
6 February	"Pahad Elohim"	Kfir Tsafrir	"Pahad Elohim"	Kfir Tsafrir	"Unwritten"	Natasha Bedingfield
13 February	"Pahad Elohim"	Kfir Tsafrir	"Pahad Elohim"	Kfir Tsafrir	"Unwritten"	Natasha Bedingfield
20 February	"Menagen Ve'Shar"	Osher Cohen	"Menagen Ve'Shar"	Osher Cohen	"Unwritten"	Natasha Bedingfield
27 February	"Menagen Ve'Shar"	Osher Cohen	"Menagen Ve'Shar"	Osher Cohen	"Unwritten"	Natasha Bedingfield
5 March	"Menagen Ve'Shar"	Osher Cohen	"Menagen Ve'Shar"	Osher Cohen	"Beautiful Things"	Benson Boone
12 March	"Menagen Ve'Shar"	Osher Cohen	"Menagen Ve'Shar"	Osher Cohen	"Beautiful Things"	Benson Boone
19 March	"Menagen Ve'Shar"	Osher Cohen	"Menagen Ve'Shar"	Osher Cohen	"Beautiful Things"	Benson Boone
26 March	"Menagen Ve'Shar"	Osher Cohen	"Menagen Ve'Shar"	Osher Cohen	"Beautiful Things"	Benson Boone
2 April	"Menagen Ve'Shar"	Osher Cohen	"Menagen Ve'Shar"	Osher Cohen	"Beautiful Things"	Benson Boone
9 April	"Rak Shelach"	Omer Adam	"Rak Shelach"	Omer Adam	"Beautiful Things"	Benson Boone
16 April	"Rak Shelach"	Omer Adam	"Rak Shelach"	Omer Adam	"Beautiful Things"	Benson Boone
23 April	"Rak Shelach"	Omer Adam	"Rak Shelach"	Omer Adam	"Beautiful Things"	Benson Boone
30 April	"Tzamud Tzamud"	Omer Adam, Odeya, and Shrek	"Tzamud Tzamud"	Omer Adam, Odeya, and Shrek	"Beautiful Things"	Benson Boone
7 May	"Tzamud Tzamud"	Omer Adam, Odeya, and Shrek	"Tzamud Tzamud"	Omer Adam, Odeya, and Shrek	"Beautiful Things"	Benson Boone
14 May	"Tzamud Tzamud"	Omer Adam, Odeya, and Shrek	"Tzamud Tzamud"	Omer Adam, Odeya, and Shrek	"Beautiful Things"	Benson Boone
21 May	"Tzamud Tzamud"	Omer Adam, Odeya, and Shrek	"Tzamud Tzamud"	Omer Adam, Odeya, and Shrek	The Code	Nemo

== See also ==
- Media Forest, another weekly music chart in Israel
