= Itay Levi =

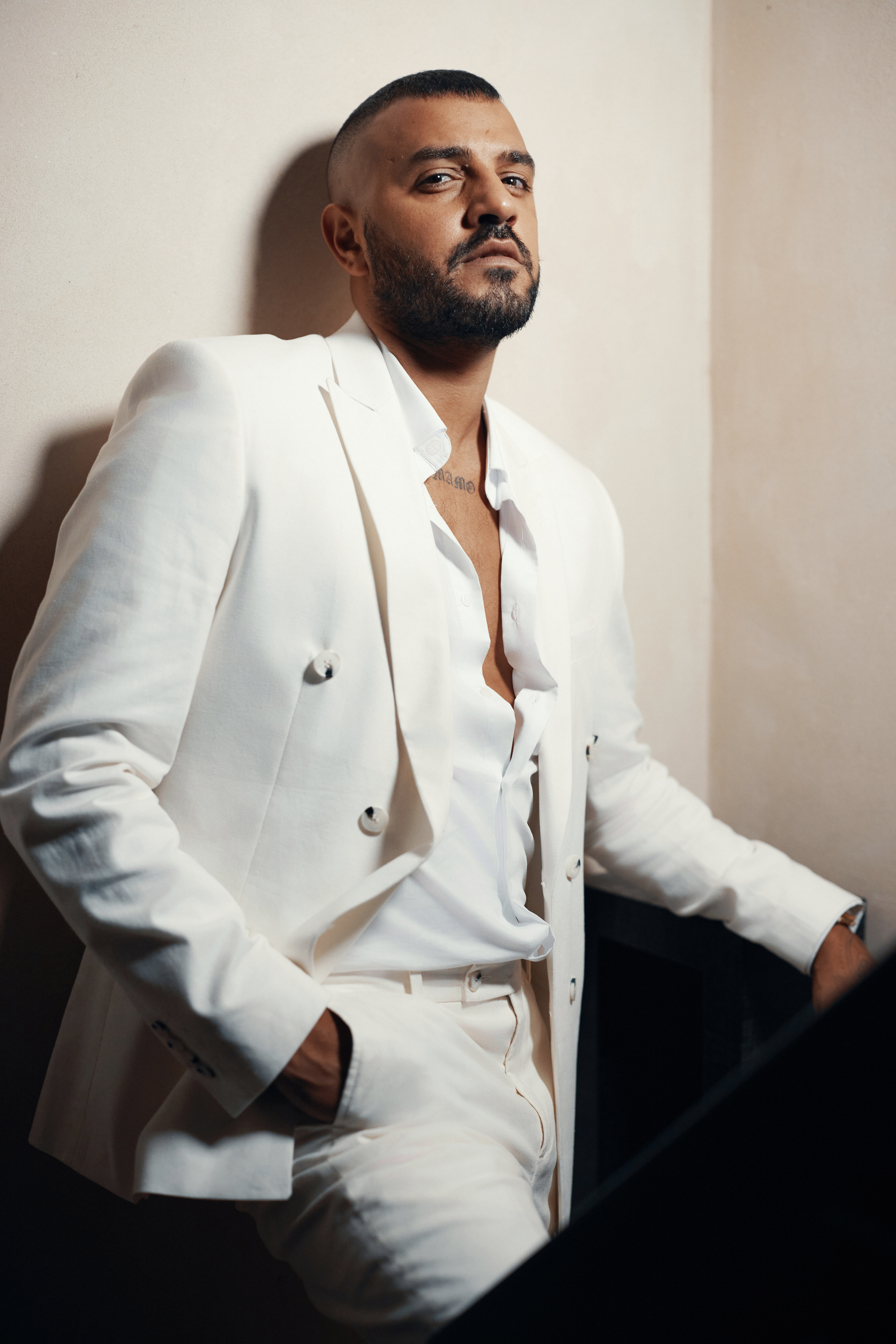
- Born: 25 January 1988 (age 38); Gan Yavne, Israel
- Occupations: singer; songwriter
- Years active: 2013–present
- Musical career
- Genres: Dance; Mizrahi; Pop
- Instruments: Vocals; Piano; Guitar
- Labels: Singold; Liam; Ruth

Itay Levi (Hebrew: איתי לוי, born 25 January 1988) is an Israeli musician.

== Personal life ==
Levi was born on 25 January 1988 in Gan Yavne to a Yemeni Jewish family. Levi is the son of Zakon and has two older brothers.

Levi's father died of lung cancer when Levi was 16 years old. Levi's mother has suffered five strokes that left her with a nursing disability. During military service, Levi served as a sergeant major at the Parachute School.

On 25 December 2023, Levi bought the Maccabi Sha'arayim as a tribute to his father, who was a fan of the team before his death.

As of 2024, Levi lives in Tel Aviv.

== Career ==
=== 2013–2015: What's Going on with You? ===
At the beginning of his career, Levi worked as a sketch singer alongside other composers including Avi Ohayon, Elad Trabelsi, and Assaf Tzruya. When Levi first heard the song "Almost a Love Song", he asked the song's composers, Trabelsi and Tzruya, permission for him to perform the song. The two agreed after two and a half years, and Levi released the song as his debut single with commercial success.

In 2014, Levi released his debut album "What's Going on with You". Songs featured on the album include "Almost a Love Song", "What's Going on with You", "No One Else", "We'll Talk", "Childhood of the Past", and "Cold Nights". In addition, he performed a cover version of Yehuda Poliker's song "The Shadow and I".

In January 2015, the distribution and new media company Singold gifted Levi a medal of appreciation after the songs on his album “What’s Going on with You” hit over 250,000 uses and downloads on mobile.

=== 2015–2016: The Whole City Knows and other projects ===
In early 2015, Levi released the song "Yom Shani", which was the first single from his new album, and reached 1M views on Levi's official YouTube channel. During IDF Martyrs' Day that year, Levi released the song "Heroes" in memory of Oron Shaul, who took part in the "Song and Memory" project by "Linkton”. He later signed with Eyal Golan's production company " Liam Productions, " which is managed by Golan's personal manager, Benny Peretz. After the high-profile signing, Levi released the single "Wires and Microphones", followed by the single "5 Words" from his second album.

In January 2015, Levi released the duet "Another Day" with singer Margalit Tzan'ani. In August, he released the duet "For This Day I Waited" with Maya Avraham. In September, Levi won the title of "Breakthrough of the Year" on the Mediterranean music portal "Hafle".

On 12 January 2016, he released his second album, "The Whole City Knows".

=== 2017–2018: Surviving Love ===
On 17 July 2017, Levi released the album "Surviving Love", from which the single "Party in Haifa" was released, in which he collaborated with "The Ultras" and DJ Ayalon Matana, the song became the most played song of 2016. In this album, he collaborated with Eyal Golan on the song "Wedding of the Year". He also renewed Yehuda Levi's song "Raziti".

In 2017, he participated in the docu-reality show "Connected" on Hot, which documented, among other things, Levi's daily life as a Mediterranean singer. That same year, he also performed the theme song for the film "Jesta".

On 4 December 2017, he released the first song, "Love Will Burn", from his fourth studio album of the same name.

On 25 February 2018, Levi released the song "Mamo" in collaboration with singer and dancer Stéphane Legar. In the same year, he released the single "Here It Comes" (a cover version of Arik Sinai's "A Good Reason" with lyrics by Ehud Manor and music by Matti Caspi) together with the trio Ma Kher and Noa Kirel.

=== 2019–2020: May Love Burn and Walking Barefoot ===
In 2019, he released, together with Eden Ben Zaken, the official festival song "Our Time".

During 2019, he began modeling for the fashion company "Lee Cooper". Following this, the company launched a capsule collection designed in collaboration with and inspired by Levi. In addition, Levi and the fashion company released a new song in 2019 called "New York City - NYC", which was included in his fourth album "Let Love Burn".

In early November 2019, Itay Levi won first place in the "MasterChef Special VIP" program, which aired on Keshet Channel 12.

On 20 November 2019, Levi began judging the seventh season of the show "The Next Star for Eurovision" on a regular basis, replacing Harel Skaat. That same month, Levi released a remake of the song "Thank You".

On 22 March 2020, he released his first mini-album, which is his fifth album in a row, "Walking Barefoot". In the same year, he hosted the program "Party on Channel 24 with Itay Levi" which aired on Channel 24.

=== 2020-Present: End of Sandstorm, Waiting for You to Come, and One Every Minute ===
In July 2020, it was announced that he had left Liam Productions, managed by Eyal Golan. After leaving, he continued his career at the company "Ruth Productions", which he founded in his mother's name.

On 24 March 2021, he released his second mini-album, which is his sixth album in number, Sufa Shel Hul, published by "Ruth Productions". Which became his first album released after leaving Liam Productions. On 19 December 2021, he released the song "I'm No Longer in You".

On 4 May 2022, Itay released the song "Free". In the same month, Itay released the song "Baraka" with Ido Shoham. On 13 June 2022, Itay released the song "Because of the Wind" with the reserve soldiers. In the same month, he released the songs "After Amala" and "Om K'vel Toum" with Stefan Leger. On 30 June 2022, he released his fifth studio album, which is his seventh album in number, Waiting for You to Come. On 12 July, he released the songs "Circus", "Lift Up" and "12 at Night". In September 2022, he released the song "I Don't Do Anything for You". On 8 November 2022, he began playing in the musical "Kazablan" in the role of Kazablan himself, alternating with Ofer Hayon, directed by Eldar Gohar Groisman, and produced by the Habima Theatre and the Israeli HaShaa Theater.

On 18 January 2023, he released the single "Sometimes". On 16 February, he released the single "Half a Human". On 22 March, he released the single " Lost Control ". In April 2023, he appeared at the torch-lighting ceremony. On 24 May, he released the single "We Didn't Stop", which reached number 14 on Media Forest's weekly chart. On 8 June, he released the song "Pol Gaz", a collaboration with Ofir Cohen again after ten years. They previously collaborated on the hit "Wedding of the Year". The song is part of a larger project called "Shishu and Simchahu", which includes party hits. On 3 July, he released the single " Ten Fingers " from his sixth studio album, which is his eighth album in number and is also the album of the decade - in honor of a decade of a career called One Minute at a Time. "Ten Fingers" reached number 17 on the Media Forest weekly chart. On 15 August, his sixth studio album, " One Minute, " was released. The song "You" from the album reached number one on the Media Forest chart.

On 27 November, he released the songs "After the Flood" and " I Have No Other Place", which reached 15th and fourth place on Media Forest's weekly chart, respectively. Additionally, "I Have No Other Place" reached number 23 on the Mako Hitlist chart.

On 9 May 2024, the compilation album "Israel Entertainment - Singing for the State" was released, where Levi performed the song "Nowhere to Escape" alongside Agam Buchbot. The song reached number 17 on Media Forest's weekly Israeli chart. On 26 May, Levi released two singles, "Hula Yarach" and "Ma'arif Rishon". The first reached number one on the Media Forest Hebrew chart, while the second entered the Galgalatz playlist.

In addition, "Moon Sick" reached number 52 and "West First" reached number 16 on the Mako Hitlist chart. On 22 August, Levi released a song called "Tel Aviv Center". On 26 August, he released the single "Lift Your Hands". On 26 November, the song " I Moved Forward From You " was released, a joint performance by Levi and Sasson Ifram Shaulov.

On 12 March 2025, Levi's single "Nachlat Binyamin" was released.

On 9 April, he released the single "Just Don't Fall in Love" with Subliminal and The Shadow, which reached second place on the Israeli Media Forest chart. On 19 May, he released the single "Striped Suit" as part of the musical project " Ilanot 41", a musical project inspired by Bible stories initiated by Avi Ohayon and Matan Dror.

On 19 June, he released the single "Broken Windows".

== Discography ==
=== Studio albums ===
- 2014: What's Going on With You?
- 2016: The Whole City knows
- 2017: Surviving Love
- 2019: May Love Burn
- 2022: Waiting for You to Come
- 2023: One Every Minute
- 2025: 11

=== Mini-albums ===
- 2020: Walking Barefoot
- 2021: End of Sandstorm
- 2025: Sadness on the Beat

=== Live albums ===
- 2024: Menorah 2024 Full Show
