= Doli & Penn =

Israeli production duo

Doli & Penn דולי ופן
- Genres: Pop; Mizrahi; hip hop
- Occupations: Songwriters; record producers
- Years active: 2014–present
- Label: NMC
- Members: Dolev Ram; Penn Hazut

Doli & Penn (Hebrew: דולי ופן) is a songwriting and production duo consisting of Dolev "Doli" Ram and Penn Hazut. Best known by songwriting and producing credits on Mizrahi-pop hits by Eden Ben Zaken, Dudu Aharon, Eden Hason, Omer Adam, and Eyal Golan, among others. In 2017, they wrote and produced the Israeli entry for the Eurovision Song Contest 2017, "I Feel Alive" by Imri Ziv.

== History ==
Ram and Hazut began producing music together after contacting on Facebook in 2014. The first song they wrote together was "Af Achat Acheret" by Itay Levy. That year, they wrote the Mizrahi-pop hit by Eden Ben Zaken "Malkat HaShoshanim", which peaked at number four on the Media Forest airplay chart.

In 2015 they wrote the R&B hit "Yesh Bi Ahava" by Noa Kirel, which debuted at number six on the Media Forest TV chart. In 2016 they wrote for Kirel another song called "Hetzi Meshuga".

In 2017 they wrote and produced Israel's entry for the Eurovision Song Contest 2017 "I Feel Alive" by Imri Ziv.

In May 2018 they won ACUM prize for Best Composers of the Year.

In July 2019 they released their debut single as a production duo "Ach Sheli Mitchaten" featuring singer Mosh Ben-Ari, which peaked at number two on the Media Forest weekly chart. In October they released another single, "Meusharim", featuring Noa Kirel and Liran Danino, which reached the top of the Media Forest weekly chart.

In June 2023, Omer Adam released his seventh album, End of the World, which included the songs "DXB to TLV" and "Both Opposites" that Doli & Penn wrote and produced. That same month, Dudu Aharon released the song "To Touch the Skies" that Doli & Penn was written, composed and produced to celebrate his marriage proposal and upcoming wedding.

== Discography ==
=== Singles ===
Title	Year	Peak chart positions	Album
Title	Year	ISR	Album
"Ach Sheli Mitchaten" (featuring Mosh Ben-Ari)	2019	2	TBA
"Meusharim" (featuring Noa Kirel and Liran Danino)	2019	1	TBA
"Tarutzi Elav" (featuring Rotem Cohen and Beit Habubot)	2019	10	TBA
"HaKochavim Bochim BaLayla" (featuring Shiri Maimon and Dudu Aharon)	2019	3	TBA
"Ve'Az At Tir'ee" (featuring Dikla, Idan Haviv and Mark Eliyahu)	2020	5	TBA
