= Gal De Paz =

Israeli singer (born 1986)

Gal De Paz גל דה פז
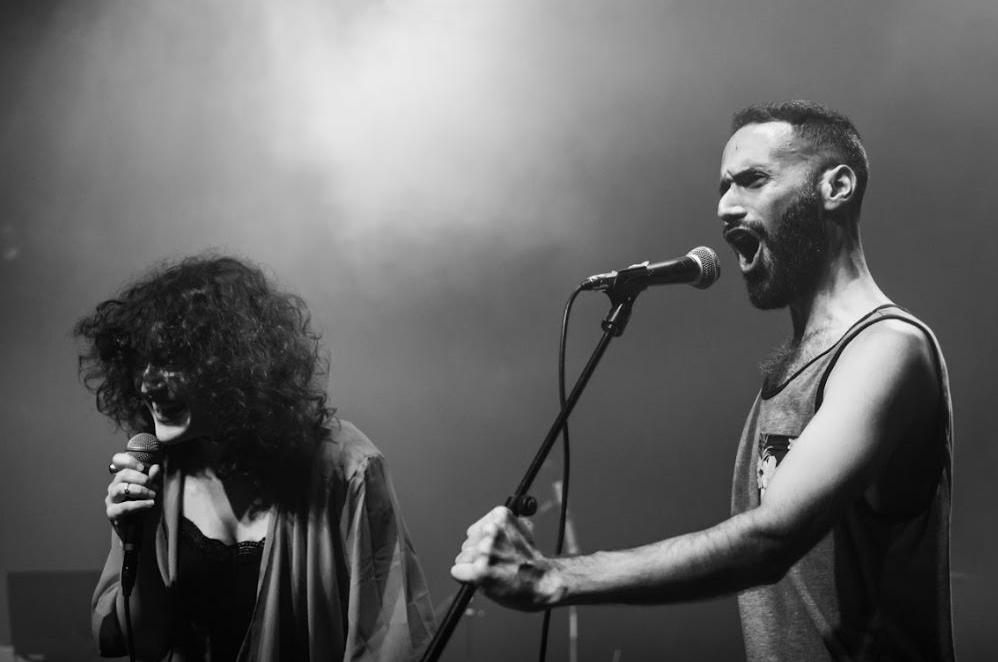
- Gal De Paz (left) in a live gig with Ohad Bar, 2019

Background information
- Born: 12 November 1986 (age 39); Eilat, Israel
- Genres: Indie; Alternative; Blues
- Occupation: Singer
- Instrument: Vocals
- Years active: 2010–present

Gal De Paz (born November 12, 1986) is an Israeli singer-songwriter, lead singer of De Paz Band, member of the Lucille Crew, and voice development teacher. Gal finished in second place in the twelfth season of the HaKokhav HaBa.

== Biography ==
De Paz was born in Eilat to Dafna Ben-David, a lawyer, and Ofer. When she was three years old, her parents divorced and she moved with her mother to Caesarea.
