= Hamsa (musical group) =

Israeli musical quintet

Hamsa חמסה
- Origin: Israel
- Years active: 2001–2004
- Past members: Naama Etel; Esther Castro; Pazit Herman; Carmi Shimron; Yasmin Suissa

Hamsa (Hebrew: חמסה) was an Israeli all-girl musical quintet formed in 2001 by music producers Eyal Buchbut and Dror Margalit.

== History ==
The group members were Esther (Eti) Castro, Pazit Herman, Carmi Shimron, Yasmin Suissa and Naama Etel. They began their journey in 2000 in the auditions held for the Eurovision Song Contest, and in 2001 finished in third place at the Eurovision Song Israeli qualifying contest with their song "Darbuka".

Two years later the group released their debut album, also named "Hamsa". It had a relatively commercially success with more than 15,000 copies sold in Israel. The single "Hayav Lamut Alay" (You Must Love Me To Death) was released in January 2003 and topped the Reshet Gimel music chart. In the 2003 top 40 chart it reached the 7th place. The song's music video was released on YouTube by Hed Arzi in June 2011, and as of 2026 has almost 3 million views.

On May 31, 2004, the group announced it was breaking up, but later that year Buchbut and Margalit, who originally created the group, announced they were recruiting new members to replace the original cast for a new Hamsa band, but this initiative was never realised.

In July 2020, with the help of producer and agent Roberto Ben-Shoshan, the group reunited without Karmi Shimron and Yasmin Suissa, and joined by Sivan Ganon, who was selected out of 30 candidates who auditioned. On August 2, Hamsa released their single "Inti Hayati", written by Moran David and Hadas Cohen, along with a music video. They reunited again in 2024 to compete in the eleventh season of HaKokhav HaBa.

== Members ==
- Naama Etel
- Esther Castro
- Pazit Herman
- Carmi Shimron
- Yasmin Suissa
