= Rani Rahav =

Israeli public relations consultant

- רני רהב
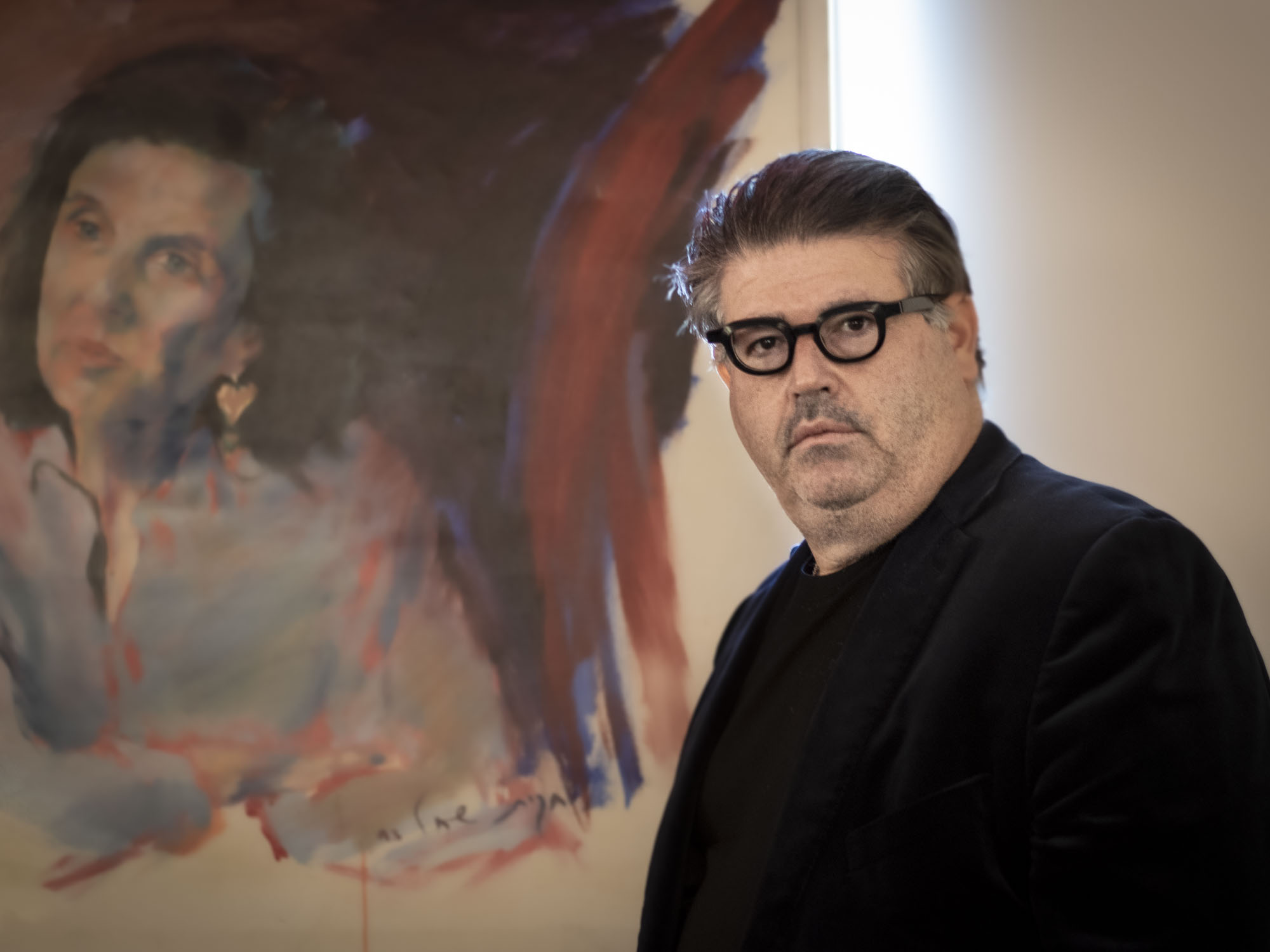
- Rahav in 2020
- Born: Ran Rahav; 29 April 1964 (age 61); Ramat Gan, Israel
- Occupations: Chairman of Ran Rahav communications and public relations
- Spouse: Hila Rahav (m. 1992)
- Children: 1

Ran "Rani" Rahav (Hebrew: רני רהב; born 29 April 1964) is an Israeli public relations consultant. He is the owner and chairman of Ran Rahav Communications and Public Relations. He also serves as the Honorary Consul of the Marshall Islands in Israel.

== Biography ==
Rahav was born and raised in Ramat Gan, Israel. He served in the Israeli Air Force as an educational NCO. At the age of 22, he was appointed Director of the Public Relations and Entertainment Department at the Dan Panorama Tel Aviv Hotel. At the age of 23, he was appointed spokesperson for the entire Dan Hotels chain, a position he continues to hold from the time Rahav Communications was founded to this present day.

In 1991, Rahav established the Ran Rahav Communications and Public Relations Office in partnership with Israeli businessman Baruch Ivcher. A few years later, Ivcher gave Rahav about 50 percent as a gift, which made Rahav the full owner of the firm.

Rahav's office represents about 120 companies and has 41 employees. Among the company's clients are El Al, Teva, Bank Hapoalim, Cellcom, and Shufersal.

In 2013, Rahav participated in the TV show "Rising star," which was broadcasting on channel 2 in Israel. In 2019, he started hosting the TV show "Sharon and Rani LTD" along with Sharon Gal. That same year, he announced his intentions to quit from hosting the show asking to be replaced by a woman after the holiday season.

Over the years, Rahav served as an adviser to Israel's Prime Ministers, Government Ministers, and Members of the Israeli Parliament. He was also a secret advisor to Prime Minister Yitzhak Rabin. Ran Rahav is rated by the media as one of the most influential figures in Israel.

== Public criticism ==
Rahav and his wife host social events with leading members of the public, and private sectors in Israel. In February 2007, Rahav organized a grandiose event with 5000 guests for his son's Bar Mitzvah. The event was heavily covered by the Israeli media along with criticism by the public, and some journalists such as Raanan Shaked in his column at "Yediot Aharonot" and Yaron London in his TV show "London et Kirschenbaum". Some public figures had participated in that event, such as the Police Commissioner Moshe Karadi, Judges, Government Ministers, and other public figures. Criticism emerged because some of those who had attended were undergoing police investigations and criminal proceedings at the time. Rahav released an article, commenting on this criticism.

In November 2013, Rahav stood by embattled singer Eyal Golan.

In an interview on the radio station 103FM, Gabi Gazith interviewed Israel Gudovich on the matter of the falling balconies in a new building in Hadera, built by Gindi investments.

During the interview, Rahav's name was not mentioned. Still Rahav related their words to himself and sued 103FM, Gazith, and Gudovich for million Shekels. The court ruled Rahav a compensation and expenses at a sum of 8500 Shekels from the radio station, following the publication of Rahav's name and picture in the station's website, and also made Rahav pay expenses to Gazith, and Gudovich for a sum if 100,000 Shekels since they did not mention his name in the radio broadcast. Rahav announced that he would appeal. Gudovich considered a counter lawsuit. Rahav withdrew his appeal after the two clarified that they did not mean Rahav in their words.

== Philanthropic activities ==
Ran Rahav takes an active part in a variety of voluntary public positions with non-profits and cultural institutions.

- Since 1995, he has been a member of the public committee that supports ALUT, the Israeli Society for children and adults with autism, and serves as the Parent Admissions Commissioner.
- Since 1998, he has been a member of the Board of Trustees of the Tel Aviv Museum of Art.
- Since 1998, he has been a member of the AIDS Fighting Task Force in Israel.
- Since 1998, he has been a member of the Friends of Haim Sheba Medical Center Association in Tel Hashomer and the Sourasky Medical Center.
- Since 1995, he has been a member of the management of the Variety Israel organization.
- Member of the Friends Association of Sourasky Ichilov Hospital Tel Aviv, Habima, Gesher Theater, Cameri Theatre, and Beit Lessin.

== Personal life ==
Rahav and his wife Hila (married since 1992) have one son. Hila Rahav is the CEO of "Rahav communications" and the chairperson of "Friends Beit Lessin theater" Association.

Rani and Hila Rahav are known as Israeli art collectors with the sixth-largest art collection in Israel.
