= Kfir Tsafrir =

Israeli singer

Kfir Tsafrir כפיר צפריר
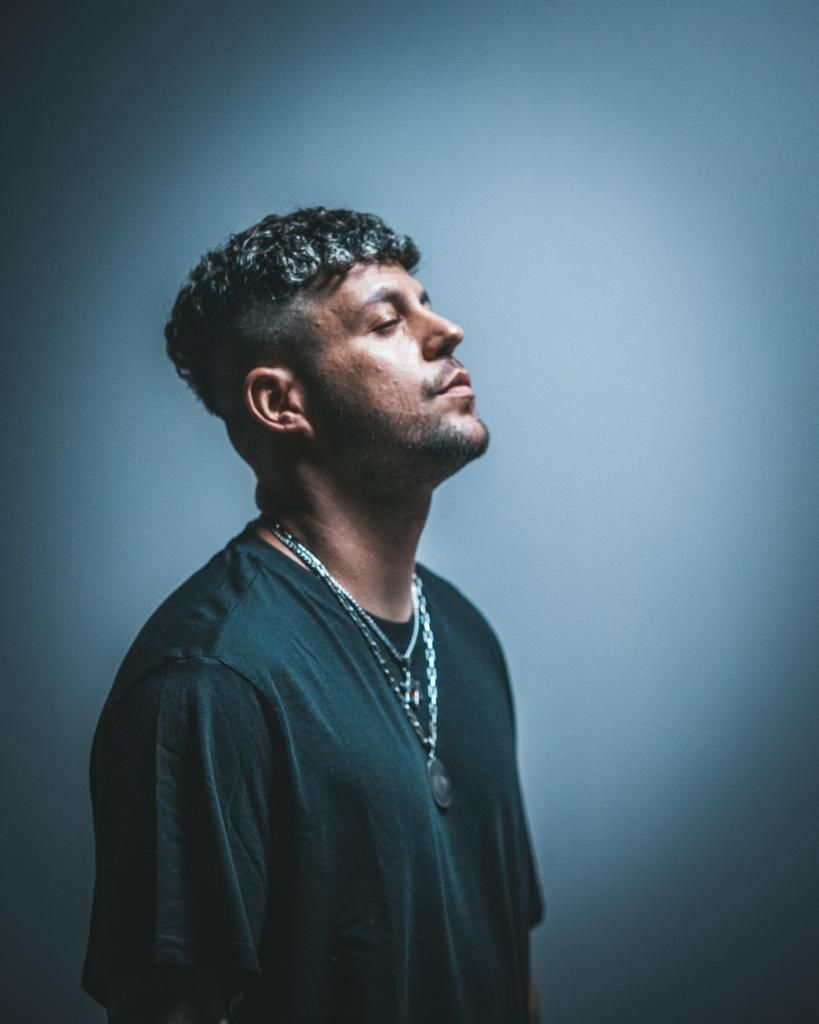

Background information
- Born: 28 March 1990 (age 36); Petah Tikva, Israel
- Genres: Pop, hip hop
- Occupations: Singer, rapper, songwriter, producer
- Years active: 2018–present

Kfir Tsafrir (Hebrew: כפיר צפריר; born 28 March 1990) is an Israeli singer, songwriter, rapper, and producer.

== Biography ==
Tsafrir grew up in Petah Tikva. He started writing music at the age of 14.

In March 2020, he released his first single, "Missing You." Later that year, he released "Another Star", "Higher", "Flex with Dafna and Dodido" and "Not Everything Is Working" in collaboration with singer Keren Crispil. In August, he collaborated with rapper Ron Nesher on "Click."

In September 2021, he released his debut album Run. It featured guest appearances from Omer Nachmias, Ziv Shavit, Teddy Ngusa, Keren Crispil, Mevu HaDodaim and Nomi.

In 2022, Tsafrir participated in the reality show The Next Star. In an audition, he performed "Crime Film" and received 82% of the votes. He was eliminated in the final phase but signed a contract with Teddy Productions.

In September 2022, the song "Sos Taverini" was released. In February 2023, he released "Fear of God". It became a sleeper hit, and in November, about nine months after release, went viral on TikTok and various streaming sites. It reached the first place on the Mako Hitlist chart, the top ten of the Kan Gimel chart, and featured on the Galgalatz chart.

On 12 March 2024, the single "Detach Me" featuring Netta Barzilai was released. On 9 May of the same year, the compilation album Israel Bidor – Singing to the State was released, where Tsafrir performed the song "Albabala" with Anna Zeke. In September 2024, he released a song called "Sick of You".

Tsafrir lives in Rishon LeZion.

== Discography ==
=== Albums ===
- 2018: רוץ

=== EP ===
- 2018: כל מה שצריך
- 2019: פוזה
- 2020: פלקס עם דפנה ודודידו
- 2021: זה מה שאתם רוצים
- 2022: סרט פשע
- 2023: פחד אלוהים
- 2024: אלבבאלה
- 2024: נתק אותי ft Netta Barzilai
