= Noa Kirel =

Israeli singer-songwriter and actress (born 2001)

Noa Kirel Pérez
- נוֺעה קירל
- Kirel in 2023
- Born: Noya Kirel (נויה קירל); 10 April 2001 (age 25); Ra'anana, Israel
- Occupations: Singer; songwriter; dancer; actress; television presenter
- Years active: 2015–present
- Spouse: Daniel Peretz (m. 2025)
- Musical career
- Origin: Ra'anana, Israel
- Genres: Pop; dance-pop
- Instrument: Vocals
- Labels: Atlantic; NMC; Roberto Music
- Website: noakirelbeauty.com

Noa Kirel Pérez (Note: Hebrew: נוֹעָה קִירֶל, pronounced [ˈnoʔa kiˈʁel]) (née Kirel; born 10 April 2001) is an Israeli singer, songwriter, actress, model, and television presenter. She has won six MTV Europe Music Awards for Best Israeli Act from 2017 to 2024. She represented Israel in the Eurovision Song Contest 2023 with the song "Unicorn", finishing in third place.

== Early and personal life ==
Noa Kirel was born and raised in Ra'anana, to Israeli-born parents. Her mother's family is of both Sephardi Jewish (Moroccan-Jewish) and Mizrahi Jewish descent, whereas her father's family is of Ashkenazi Jewish (Austrian-Jewish) descent. She is the youngest child of Ilana and Amir Kirel. She has two older brothers, Niv Kirel and Ofri Kirel. Her father is the CEO of Glassco Glass, an imported-glass business, headquartered at the Barkan Industrial Park. Her mother is the owner of a boutique fashion store. On her father's side, Kirel has relatives who were murdered in the Auschwitz concentration camp during World War II and the Holocaust. Her maternal grandfather was a rabbi and a sofer ST"M (Jewish scribe).

Her parents named her Noya, but after she was diagnosed with a severe kidney illness as a three-month-old baby, a rabbi suggested a name change to Noa (for health and wellness). He also jokingly predicted that she might become a dancer. With medical treatment, Kirel recovered, but has only one functioning kidney as a result of the bacterium that stopped her second kidney from growing.

In February 2020, Kirel was conscripted into the Israel Defense Forces (IDF), and served in her own military band. She received an honorable discharge, completing her two-year mandatory service on 14 February 2022.

Kirel was in a relationship with Israeli model and actor Tomer HaCohen from October 2021 to early 2023. In August 2023, she began dating Israel national football team goalkeeper Daniel Peretz. They got engaged on 6 September 2024, and married on 11 November 2025 in Tel Aviv. Kirel debuted two new songs during her wedding celebrations, "Bridezilla" and "Kol Ma She'ani Rotza". Her new sister-in-law, Shelly Peretz, presented her boyfriend at the wedding. Kirel made a parody with a lip sync of the words that Lihi Griner said to Avivit Bar Zohar, who presented her boyfriends at the weddings of Griner and Kirel.

Before her November 2025 wedding, Kirel participated in a mikveh immersion and a hafrashat challah ceremony.

== Singing career ==
=== Pushers, Single releases (2015–2017); and LipStar ===
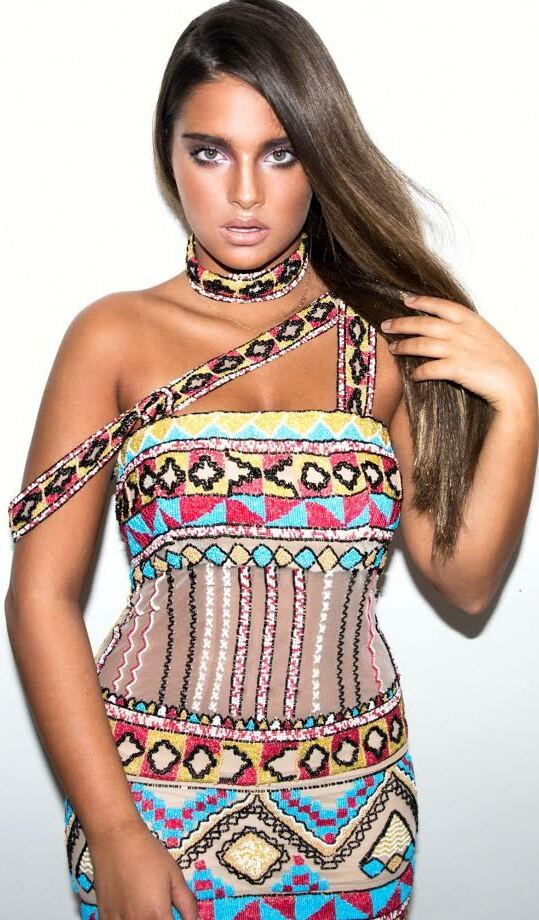
Kirel in 2016

Kirel appeared in the Israeli docu-reality HOT's series Pushers, which tracks wealthy parents who push their children to success in different areas. The show featured teenage Kirel and her father, who was financially supporting her entertainment career. Kirel is managed in her homeland by Israeli talent super-agent Roberto Ben-Shoshan, and co-managed by Sharona Nomder (Morse Artists) internationally.

In 2015, she performed her first song on YouTube titled Medabrim? (lit. 'talking') Following its success, that same year, she released another song called Killer. The provocative videoclip for the song caused a stir due to Kirel's young age. She released additional songs, which were featured on YouTube and played on various Israeli radio stations, including the songs Yesh Bi Ahava, which was the first song to enter the Galgalatz playlist; Rak Ata; Hatzi Meshuga; Bye LaHofesh; and Ten Li Siman. At the end of 2016, she won the Singer of the Year award at the Israeli Kids' Choice Awards.

In 2017, Kirel began hosting the LipStar music show on Yes KidZ channel, alongside Sagi Breitner. In May 2017, she released a song called Makom LeShinui, in which she sang in a duet with Avior Malasa, who wrote the song. Kirel released several marketing singles: Lirkod, Kim'At Mefursemet, Wow, Mi Iten Li Et HaKoach.

On June 22, she starred in the teen movie Nearly Famous, alongside Omer Dror. That year, she also appeared in the musical The Three Musketeers alongside Omer Dror. On August 28, Kirel released a single which she performed with Agam Buhbut, a cover version of Danny Sanderson's song Etzel HaDoda VeHaDod, as part of a campaign for Bezeq. In November 2017, she represented Israel at the 2017 MTV Europe Music Awards, in the International Artist category.

=== Israel's Got Talent, Kfula, and Freestyle Festigal (2018–2019) ===
On February 28, 2018, she first appeared on Israel's Got Talent, where Kirel has served as one of its main four judges for its 1st season – making 16-year-old Kirel the youngest person to judge an entire season of a primetime television show. She also has judged the whole 2nd season of it, which took place from 28 November 2018, to 16 April 2019.

In January 2018, she starred in the television series Kfula playing herself and Kitty Popper (Libby Omer), a blogger who writes anything that happens to her famous self. The series aired on the KidZ channel on Yes and HOT. In the same month, she released the song Ba Li Otcha. On March 25, 2018, she released the single MeGibor LeOyev. On May 1 of that year, she appeared in the series Shilton HaTzlalim as Bosmat. On August 9, a theater production Kfula show starring Kirel and the stars of the Kfula series opened at the Menora Mivtachim Arena (Yad Eliyahu Arena) in Tel Aviv. On August 20, the theme song for the #Freestyle Festigal production was released. In early September 2018, a full-length movie was released to promote the show. The show ran from November 13, 2018, to January 8, 2019. On September 5, 2018, Kirel featured in the song Cinderella of The Ultras. On September 20, she collaborated with the Shlishiat Ma Kashur trio along with Itai Levy on a new cover version of Arik Sinai's Siba Tova song, Hine Ze Ba, for a HOT campaign. In October, Kirel was selected for the second time to represent her native Israel at the MTV Europe Music Awards (MTV EMA), but was unable to attend the ceremony in Spain due to a tight schedule.

That month, Kirel was hired as a presenter for a new cosmetic company, Keff. On November 2, she released the song Zikaron Yashan in collaboration with Israeli singer Jonathan Mergui, as part of the Festigal. On November 11, the cast of the 2018 Festigal, including Kirel, released the original song Tinshom with a video clip. On November 23, she participated in a memorial tribute to Amir Fryszer Guttman. In December 2018, Kirel led a campaign with the KidZ Channel and the Israeli National Road Safety Authority promoting wearing a helmet while cycling. On April 17, 2019, she released the song Ima Sheli in memory of the Holocaust as a reminder to the world to "never forget and never again". Shortly after, on April 28, she released the song Chatsuf. In May 2020 she participated in a Yes commercial. In November 2020, Kirel joined 39 other Israeli artists for charity single Katan Aleinu, in support of hospital crews and patients to overcome the COVID-19 pandemic.

=== International recording contract (2020–present) ===
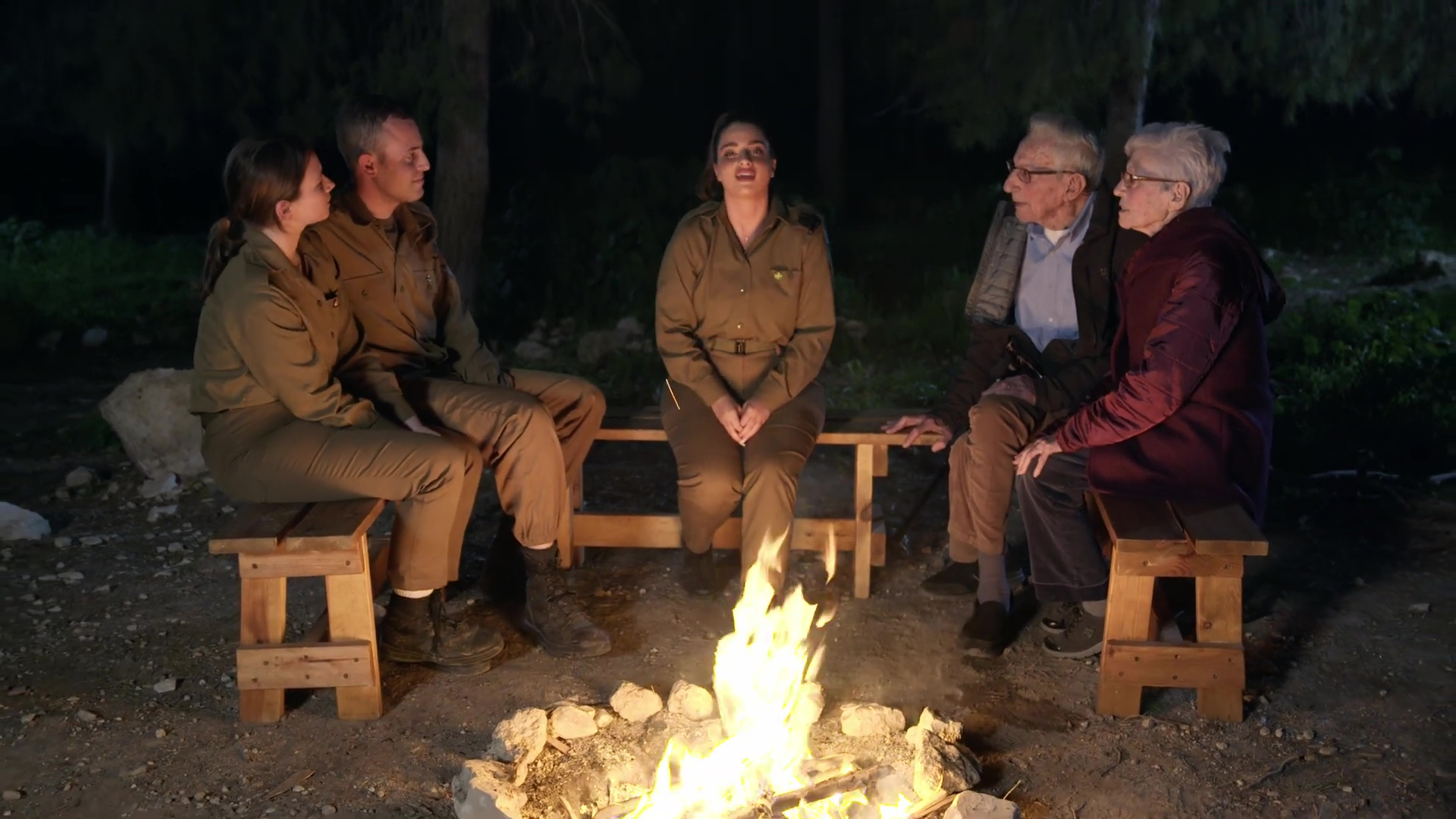
Kirel singing Hayu Zmanim in a music video honoring the 80th anniversary of Palmach

In June 2020, Kirel signed a contract with the American label, Atlantic Records. In December of that year, Kirel signed with WME. In March 2021, it was announced that Kirel would star in a feature film produced by Picturestart. In May 2021, Kirel, in collaboration with fellow Israeli singer Omer Adam, released a remix version of the Israeli national anthem, Hatikvah. The collaboration was criticized, with many calling it "disrespectful" and "embarrassing". On June 21, 2021, Kirel and Israeli comedian Ilan Peled released the single Trilili Tralala.

On July 14, 2021, she released her first international single, Please Don't Suck. On October 15, 2021, she released the single Bad Little Thing; which she also opened with for the Miss Universe 2021, which was held in Eilat. On January 12, 2022, she released the single Thought About That. On March 22, she released the single Pa'Amon, which was played in the fifth episode of the second season in the American series Ginny & Georgia on Netflix.

On May 27, 2022, she released the single DALE PROMO along with Spanish singer Metro the Savage featuring Dutch-Israeli musician Boaz van de Beatz. On July 21, she released the single BaDerech Elaich with Eliad Nachum and Doli & Penn as part of the soundtrack to the film Ohev Otcha Charlie. On August 12, she released the single Pantera. After this single, more singles were released after the announcement as a Eurovision contestant, among them: a remake together with Svika Pick for the song Harakdan HaAutomati, Mami with Odeya, another international single called Gone.

In September 2022, the satirical TV show Eretz Nehederet featured an impersonation of her performed by Gaya Be'er Gurevitch. In the sketch, she sang alongside impersonations of singers Nunu and Anna Zak, whom the Mako website referred to as "The three biggest pop queens in Israel".

On June 6, 2023, Kirel released the song "Provocativit".

On November 19, 2023, she released a special version of her Eurovision entry, "Unicorn (Hope Version)", accompanied by a music video featuring photos of the hostages, IDF soldiers, and demonstrations of support for Israel around the world amid the Gaza war. Kirel wrote, "In joy and sadness we will stand together strong against the world. Because that's the only way we'll win".

On July 10, 2024, Mako announced that Noa Kirel and Atlantic Records parted ways.

In 2026, Kirel was featured as a coach on The Voice Israel. She was the winning coach of the season when her final artist, Emma Ziza Cohen, won the season.

==== Eurovision Song Contest 2023 ====
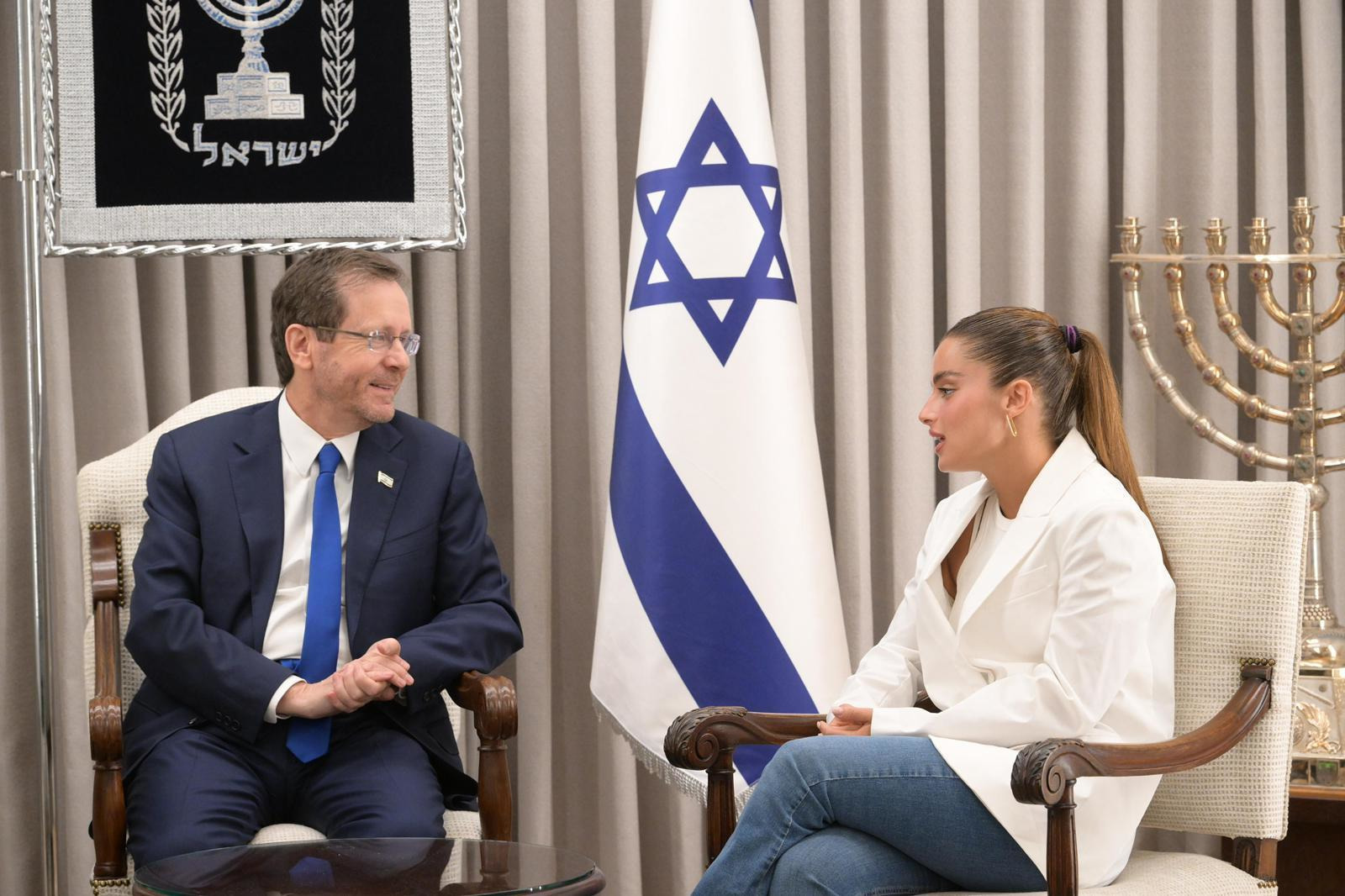
Noa Kirel as the guest of honor at Beit HaNassi alongside Israeli President Isaac Herzog in 2023

On July 11, 2022, she was selected by the Israeli Public Broadcasting Corporation (Kan 11) to represent Israel in the Eurovision Song Contest 2023. The following day, Kirel stated that she had not decided yet, and would make a decision later on. On August 10, she confirmed that she would compete at Eurovision.

Kirel's song for Eurovision, "Unicorn", was released on 8 March 2023. Besides performing the song, Kirel also co-wrote and co-composed it. Kirel performed in the first semi-final and qualified to the final. She placed third in the final, receiving the second highest number of votes from the professional jury.

== Acting career ==
In February 2025, the rom-com series Mírame así, el camino de Noa was announced, featuring Kirel and Argentinian actor Agustín Bernasconi as the main actors. The 25 episode series will be filmed in Argentina and depict Noa's trip to the South American country to meet her boyfriend, but ends up meeting Tomy, a young man in search of his identity away from music.

She starred as Noya in the series Wonder, produced by Yes Studios in partnership with Paramount. Wonder is a futuristic series in which a retired detective investigates his daughter's death in a car crash.

== Discography ==
=== Studio albums ===
- Kfula (2025)

=== Extended plays ===
- Rosh HaMemshala (2025)

=== Singles ===
==== As lead artist ====
Title	Year	Peak chart positions									Album
Title	Year	ISR	ISR Air.	ISR TV Air.	FIN	IRE	LTU	NOR	SWE	UK	Album
"Medabrim"	2015	*	—	—	—	—	—	—	—	—	Non-album singles
"Killer"	2015	*	—	—	—	—	—	—	—	—	Non-album singles
"Yesh Bi Ahava"	2015	*	—	—	—	—	—	—	—	—	Non-album singles
"Hatzi Meshuga"	2016	*	—	—	—	—	—	—	—	—	Non-album singles
"Rak Ata"	2016	*	—	—	—	—	—	—	—	—	Non-album singles
"Ten Li Siman"	2016	*	—	—	—	—	—	—	—	—	Non-album singles
"Lirkod" (with Sagi Breitner)	2017	*	—	—	—	—	—	—	—	—	Non-album singles
"Makom Leshinuy" (with Avior Malsa)	2017	*	—	—	—	—	—	—	—	—	Avior Malsa
"Kima'at Mefursemet"	2017	*	—	—	—	—	—	—	—	—	Non-album singles
"Etzel HaDoda VeHadod" (with Agam Buhbut)	2017	*	3	—	—	—	—	—	—	—	Non-album singles
"Tikitas" (featuring Stephane Legar)	2017	*	—	—	—	—	—	—	—	—	Non-album singles
"Kfula"	2017	*	—	—	—	—	—	—	—	—	Kfula
"Migibor Leoyev"	2018	*	—	—	—	—	—	—	—	—	Non-album singles
"Ba Li Otcha"	2018	*	—	—	—	—	—	—	—	—	Non-album singles
"Drum"	2019	*	—	—	—	—	—	—	—	—	Non-album singles
"Hatzuf"	2019	*	—	—	—	—	—	—	—	—	Non-album singles
"Pouch"	2019	*	7	—	—	—	—	—	—	—	Non-album singles
"SLT"	2019	*	—	—	—	—	—	—	—	—	Non-album singles
"Meusharim" (Doli & Penn featuring Liran Danino and Noa Kirel)	2020	*	1	—	—	—	—	—	—	—	Non-album singles
"Im Atah Gever"	2020	*	13	—	—	—	—	—	—	—	Non-album singles
"Million Dollar" (featuring Shahar Saul)	2020	*	1	—	—	—	—	—	—	—	Non-album singles
"Ambulance" (with Jonathan Mergui)	2020	*	4	—	—	—	—	—	—	—	Non-album singles
"Yahalomim"	2021	*	2	—	—	—	—	—	—	—	Non-album singles
"Trilili Tralala" (with Ilan Peled)	2021	*	1	—	—	—	—	—	—	—	Non-album singles
"Please Don't Suck"	2021	*	6	—	—	—	—	—	—	—	Non-album singles
"Bad Little Thing"	2021	*	14	—	—	—	—	—	—	—	Non-album singles
"Reashim" (with Osher Cohen)	2021	*	1	—	—	—	—	—	—	—	Non-album singles
"Thought About That"	2022	*	3	—	—	—	—	—	—	—	Non-album singles
"Paamon"	2022	*	1	—	—	—	—	—	—	—	Non-album singles
"Pantera"	2022	*	1	—	—	—	—	—	—	—	Non-album singles
"Mami" (with Odeya)	2022	*	1	—	—	—	—	—	—	—	Ha'amet
"Gone"	2023	*	9	—	—	—	—	—	—	—	Non-album singles
"Unicorn"	2023	*	1	—	10	37	6	30	27	45	Non-album singles
"Proboktivit"	2023	64	1	—	—	—	—	—	—	—	Non-album singles
"Deja Vu"	2023	*	7	—	—	—	—	—	—	—	Non-album singles
"Banot kamoni lo bochot"	2024	17	4	—	—	—	—	—	—	—	Non-album singles
"Mishkafaim" (with Itay Galo)	2024	16	—	—	—	—	—	—	—	—	Non-album singles
"Doctor" (with Offer Nissim)	2024	77	—	—	—	—	—	—	—	—	Non-album singles
"Ani"	2024	40	—	4	—	—	—	—	—	—	Non-album singles
"Sheyhaya lech tov"	2024	73	—	—	—	—	—	—	—	—	Non-album singles
"Ba Da Bing"	2024	44	—	—	—	—	—	—	—	—	Non-album singles
"Ata ani ulay"	2024	47	4	—	—	—	—	—	—	—	Non-album singles
"Like What U See"	2025	87	—	—	—	—	—	—	—	—	Non-album singles
"Biladech" (with Maya Bouskilla)	2025	87	—	—	—	—	—	—	—	—	Non-album singles
"Shuv higia stav" (with Rotem Shafran and the Israeli military ensembles)	2025	—	—	—	—	—	—	—	—	—	Non-album singles
"Bridezilla"	2025	2	—	1	—	—	—	—	—	—	Non-album singles
"Kol ma sheani roza"	2025	5	—	—	—	—	—	—	—	—	Non-album singles
"Oh là poupée"	2026	19	2	1	—	—	—	—	—	—	Non-album singles
"Hachi yafa k'shetaim lach"	2026	57	—	1	—	—	—	—	—	—	Non-album singles
"Ani meshakeret" (with Eden Ben Zaken)	2026	—	5	—	—	—	—	—	—	—	Non-album singles
"Hoshev she'ata Messi"	2026	69	—	1	—	—	—	—	—	—	Non-album singles
"Love Song"	2026	20	—	—	—	—	—	—	—	—	Non-album singles
"Mírame Así" (with Agus Bernasconi)	2026	—	—	—	—	—	—	—	—	—	Mírame así, el camino de Noa (soundtrack)
"Exim Obsessivim" (with Static)	2026	33	—	—	—	—	—	—	—	—	Non-album single
"—" denotes items which were not released in that country or failed to chart. "*" denotes that the chart did not exist at that time.

=== Other charted songs ===
==== As featured artist ====
List of other charted songs as featuring artist, showing year released, chart positions and album name
Title	Year	Peak chart positions	Album or EP
Title	Year	ISR	Album or EP
"Ayn oti" (Osher Cohen featuring Noa Kirel)	2024	1	Next Episode

== Filmography ==
Film
Year	Name	Role	Notes
2016	Trolls	DJ Suki	Voice; Hebrew dub
2017	Kimat Mefursemet	Rotem Levi	Cinema debut
2022	Love You Charlie	Sunshine	—

Television
Year	Name	Role	Notes
2015	Pushers	Herself	Docu-reality television series
2016	Yom BeHayei	Herself	Docu-reality television series
2017	LipStar	Herself	Television host
2018–2020	Kfula	Noa Kirel / Libi Omer	Main Role
2018–2019	Israel's Got Talent	Herself	Judge; Seasons 1–2
2018	Shilton HaTzlalim	Bosmat Amsalem	Recurring Role
2020	Lo Nafsik Lashir	Herself	Contestant
2020	Beit Sefer LeMusica	Herself	Judge (Mentor)
2023	Star Academy Israel	Herself	Host and Mentor
2025	Ani Noa Kirel	Herself	Docu-reality television series

== See also ==
- Music of Israel
- List of Israeli musical artists
- Israel in the Eurovision Song Contest

Awards and achievements
Preceded by Michael Ben David with "I.M"	Israel in the Eurovision Song Contest; 2023	Succeeded by Eden Golan with "Hurricane"
