= Sharon Gal =

Israeli journalist and politician

- שרון גל
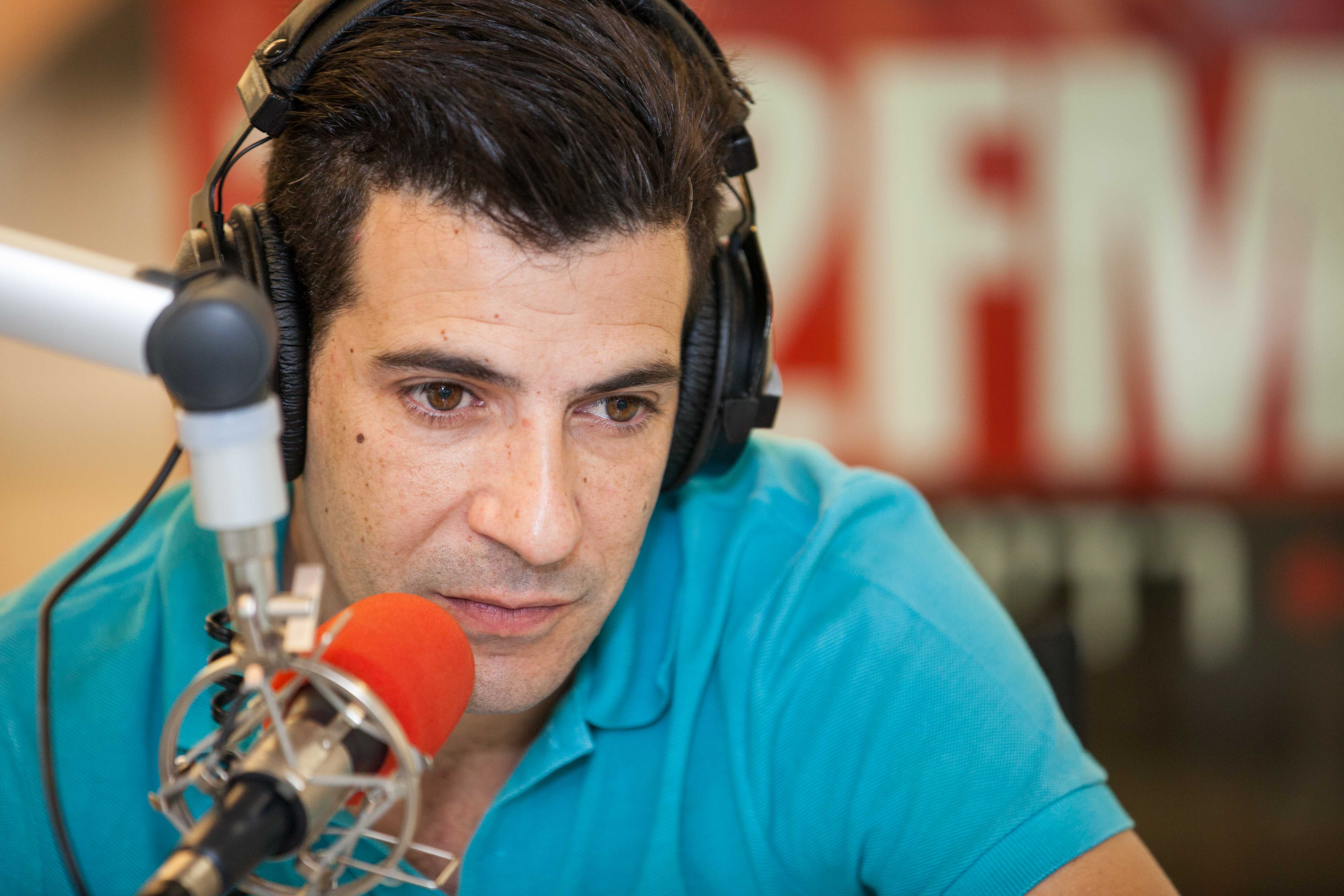

Faction represented in the Knesset
- 2015: Yisrael Beiteinu

Personal details
- Born: 13 August 1974 (age 52) Tirat Carmel, Israel

Sharon Gal (Hebrew: שרון גל; born 13 August 1974) is an Israeli radio and TV journalist and politician. He served as a member of the Knesset for Yisrael Beiteinu during 2015.

== Biography ==
Gal was born in Tirat Carmel. He hosted an economics program ('Economic Night') on Channel 10 until he resigned due to allegations of sexual harassment in 2010. The case was dropped due to lack of evidence. After his resignation, Gal became a radio show host. In summer 2014, Gal interviewed MK Haneen Zoabi on his radio show following the kidnapping of three Israeli teenagers in the West Bank. Zoabi said on the show that she did not believe the kidnappers were terrorists.

In July 2017, he started presenting the main current affairs program of Radio South and Radio Galey Israel, every morning (Sunday-Thursday) from eight to ten.

In 2019 he started hosting the TV show "Sharon and Rani LTD" along with Rani Rahav.

=== Political career ===
In January 2015, Gal was placed fifth on the Yisrael Beiteinu list for the 2015 Knesset elections, and was elected to the Knesset as the party won six seats. However, in September 2015, Gal chose to leave the Knesset after only six months in office, deciding instead to focus on journalism. He was replaced by Oded Forer.
