= Anna Zak =

Russian-born Israeli singer, model, and actress

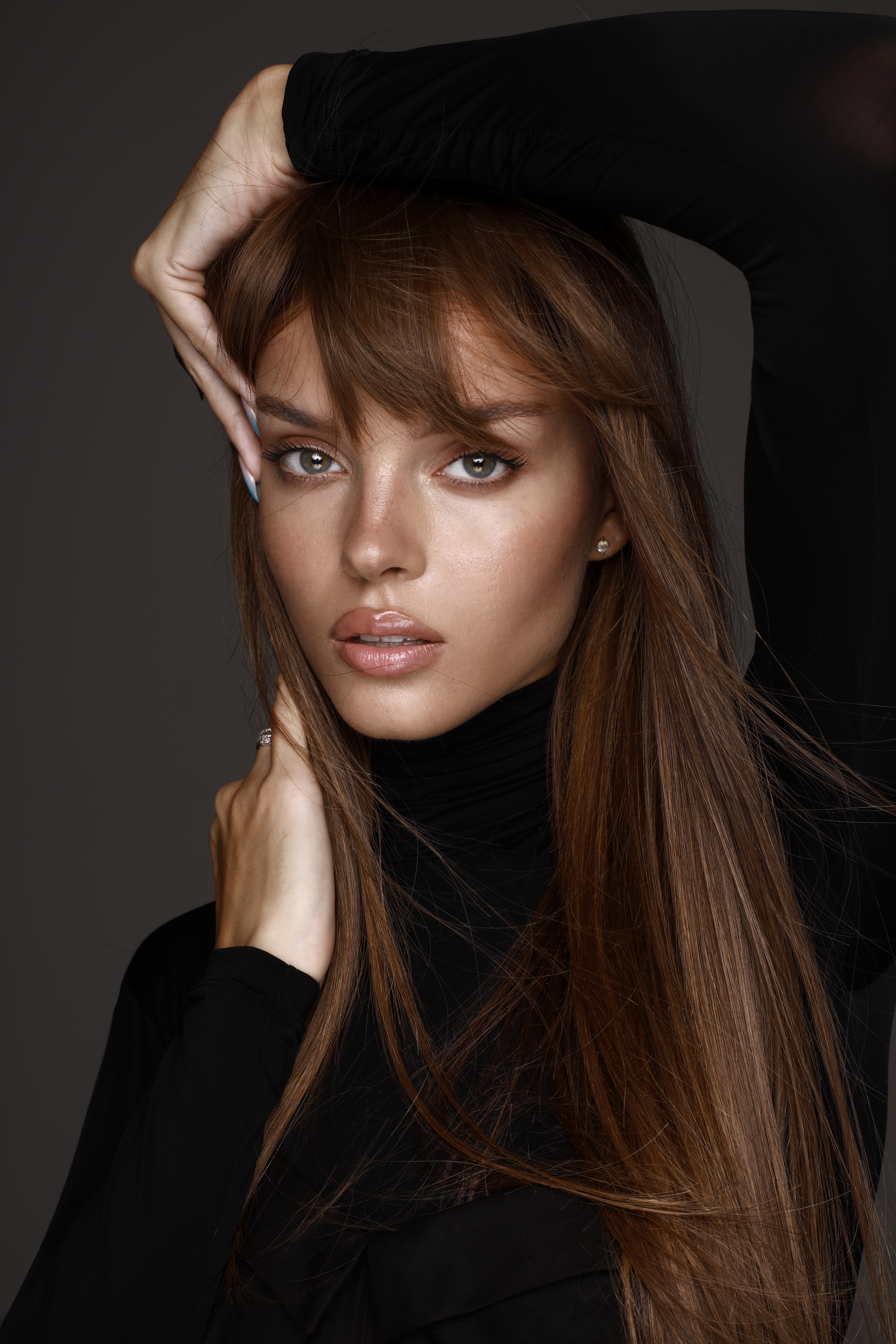
- Zak in 2023
- Born: Anna Kuzenkova; 12 March 2001 (age 25); Sochi, Russia
- Occupations: Singer, model, actress
- Years active: 2014–present
- Partner: Yehonatan "Jonathan" Mergui (December 2023–)
- Modeling information
- Height: 1.80 m (5 ft 11 in)
- Hair color: Light brown
- Eye color: Green
- Agency: ITM Models (Israel)

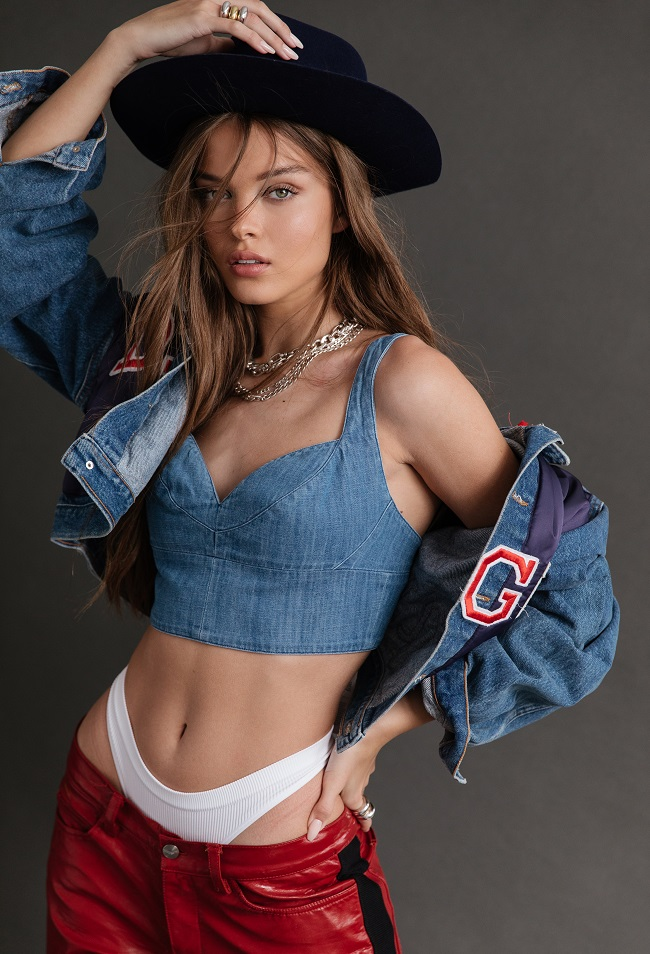
Zak in 2021

Anna Kuzenkova (Hebrew: אנה קוזנקובה, Russian: Анна Кузенкова; born 12 March 2001), known professionally as Anna Zak (Hebrew: אנה זק), is a Russian-Israeli singer, model, actress, and online personality. Her following consists of 5 million followers on TikTok and over 1 million followers on Instagram.

She is one of the most influential Israelis online. In 2017, she ranked number 1 on the Israeli youth influencing Instagram Nana 10, while the Israeli Internet Association ranked her as the overall most influential Israeli Instagrammer.

On 23 August 2017, she officially launched her musical career by releasing her debut single, "Money Honey." On 2 January 2022, she released her first commercially successful song, "Lech Lishon", which reached number one on Media Forest, Kaan Gimel, and Galgalatz charts in Israel, with its music video amassing over 20 million views. Later that year, on 22 May 2022, she released "Mi Zot" (מי זאת), which also topped the Top 100 Israel Songs Chart for 14 days and peaked at number two on the Asian Chart.

== Early and personal life ==
Anna Kuzenkova was born in Sochi, Russia, to Natalia and Denis Kuzenkov. Her father is Jewish, whereas her mother is an ethnic Russian. In 2011, when she was 10 years old, her parents, she and her sister, and the grandparents all made Aliyah to Israel. The family settled in Ashdod, a southern Israeli city on the Mediterranean coast, where she then learned to speak Hebrew. Her parents later separated and her father returned to Russia, working on the Sochi Olympics. Her older sister served in the Israeli military during the same period.

She attended the Mekif Het High School in Ashdod, Israel. She selected her surname, Zak, as a stage name while in high school.

In March 2020, she was inducted into the Israel Defense Forces (IDF) for her compulsory military service. She had been in a relationship with Israeli singer Roee Sendler since 2019. They broke up at the end of January 2023.

In December 2023, she began a relationship with Israeli singer and actor Yehonatan "Jonathan" Mergui.

== Career ==
She began her career in 2014 on the Israeli children's reality show The Boys And The Girls. In 2016 she was chosen to be the face of Scoop Shoes, earning a NIS₪50,000 contract at the age of 15 (approximately $14,000US as of 2023, and a large sum for a child). She was also selected as the face of a global campaign for the hair removal brand Veet. She said in an interview that at her school, some of her teachers do not know about her social media career. While still in ninth grade, her monthly income from her social media profile was at least NIS 10,000 (approximately $2,500USD), not counting her sponsorship deals. Although earning a large income at a young age was controversial, she told Israel Channel 2 that her family supported her career.

In 2017 she became the host of Music 24's show "To Be a Singer." She also collaborated with the model Neta Alchimister on social media. That same year she was named "the most influential person on Israeli Instagram," by the Israeli Internet Association. Nana 10 also ranked her as the most influential Israeli young person influencing on Instagram in 2017. In June 2017, Office Depot chose her as the face of its back-to-school campaign in Israel.

On 1 July 2026, she performed a duet with 2018 Eurovision winner Netta Barzilai at the opening ceremony of the 2026 Maccabiah Games.

=== Now United ===
In 2017, she successfully auditioned for Idols creator Simon Fuller's project Now United. She joined an international band with other members representing China, India, Russia, Japan, the UK, the US, the Philippines, South Korea, Finland, and Germany. She soon announced that she would head the project, rather than just be one of the singers, which meant regular flights from Israel to Los Angeles while still in school. Because of her native fluency in Russian, she served as the presenter when the group traveled to Russia.

== Discography ==
=== Charted singles ===
List of charted singles as lead artist, showing album name and year released
Title	Year	Peak chart positions	Album
Title	Year	ISR	Album
"Veni, vidi, vici"	2024	83	Non-album singles
"Lo lehitba'es"	2024	46	Non-album singles
"Hi Ahuva"	2025	66	Non-album singles

=== Other charted songs ===
List of other charted songs, showing album name and year released
Title	Year	Peak chart positions	Album
Title	Year	ISR	Album
"Albabala"	2024	77	Yisral Bidur – Shrim Lemadina

== See also ==
- Music of Israel
- Women of Israel
- Women in the Israel Defense Forces
- List of Israelis
- List of Jewish actors
- List of Jewish musicians
