= Yagel Oshri =

Israeli singer-songwriter (born 2000)

Yagel Oshri יגל אושרי
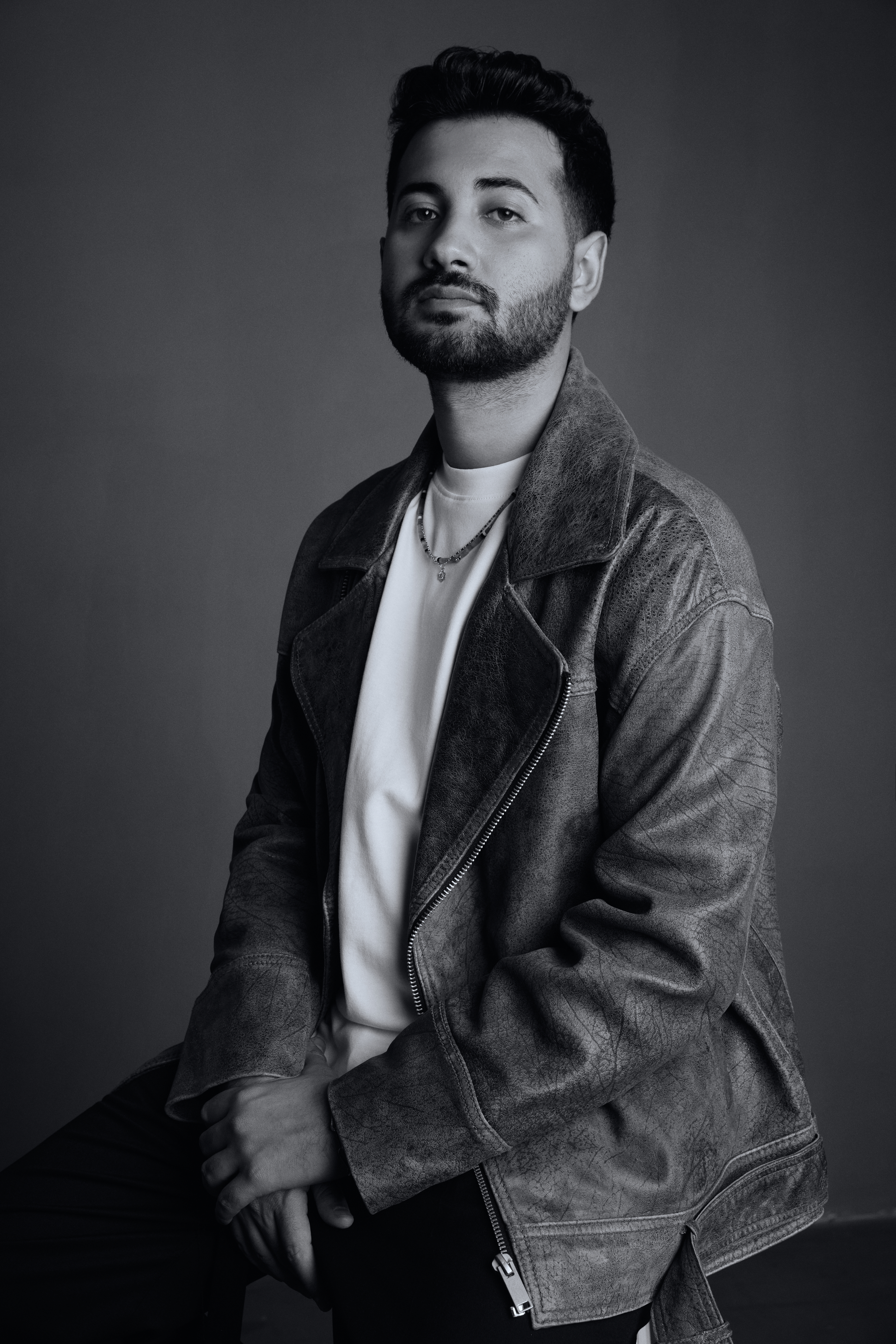

Background information
- Born: Yagel Oshri (יגל אושרי); 23 August 2000 (age 25); Israel
- Genres: Pop music
- Occupations: Singer-songwriter; Social media influencer
- Labels: Liam Productions

Yagel Oshri (Hebrew: יגל אושרי; born 23 August 2000) is an Israeli singer-songwriter and social media influencer. Oshri gained international prominence in 2023 during the Gaza war for his song "Getting Out of Depression" (Hebrew: לצאת מדיכאון), which Israeli and Jewish media called the "anthem of the war." The song became popular as a soundtrack for videos on social media of reunions between Israeli soldiers returning from duty and their surprised family members.

== Personal ==
Oshri was born in 2000. He lives with his parents and two younger brothers in Elyakhin, a moshav in central Israel.

== Career ==
By 2023, Oshri was one of Israel's rising stars on TikTok, amassing almost 500,000 followers on his Oshri Family account, sharing humorous videos of him and his family at their home in central Israel. The Jerusalem Post named Oshri one of its top 10 TikTok personalities in Israel. As a singer, Oshri was signed to Liam Productions, owned by Israeli singer Eyal Golan, earlier in 2023. In February, he released "Not Always Right" with Israeli musician Offir Cohen under Liam Productions.

=== "Getting Out of Depression" ===
Oshri came to international prominence during the Gaza war for his song "Getting Out of Depression" (Hebrew: לצאת מדיכאון), which Israeli and Jewish media called the "anthem of the war." He wrote the first version of the song in 2021 to help a friend recovering from depression from the breakup of her relationship. The song remained dormant until Oshri was experiencing depression himself, and he played a rewritten version of the song for Offir Cohen. Within seven minutes, Oshri and Cohen finished the song, including revised lyrics and melody. They released the song on 15 August 2023. Galgalatz, the top pop radio station in Israel, initially rejected the song for its weekly playlist. Oshri posted the song to streaming services and TikTok, where it gained little traction.

The song became popular during the Gaza war, as a soundtrack for videos on social media of reunions between Israeli soldiers returning from duty and their surprised family members. When Oshri sings the words, "Good days will come...", the soldier surprises their family members when returning home from service. Oshri's brother's partner was murdered at the Nova music festival massacre during the October 7 attacks on Israel, and Oshri began performing for evacuated families and for soldiers. "Getting Out of Depression" soon became ubiquitous.

By December 2023, the song had been streamed over 3.5 million times on Spotify, making Oshri the second-most streamed Israeli artist on the platform. Israeli and international media called "Getting Out of Depression" an anthem of the war, and compared the song to other songs giving hope to Israelis in wartime, such as "We Shall Pass" by Yehiel Mohar and Moshe Wilensky and "Jerusalem of Gold" by Naomi Shemer during the Six Day War, "The Last War" by Yehoram Gaon during the Yom Kippur War, "Things Will Get Better" by David Broza during Egypt–Israel peace treaty negotiations in 1977, and "Am Yisrael Chai" by Eyal Golan during the Gaza war in 2023.

Chart	Peak position
Media Forest	2
Hitlist	1
The Ten	1
Galgalat Top 10	1
