= Jasmin Moallem =

Israeli singer-songwriter (born 1995)

Jasmin Moallem יסמין מועלם
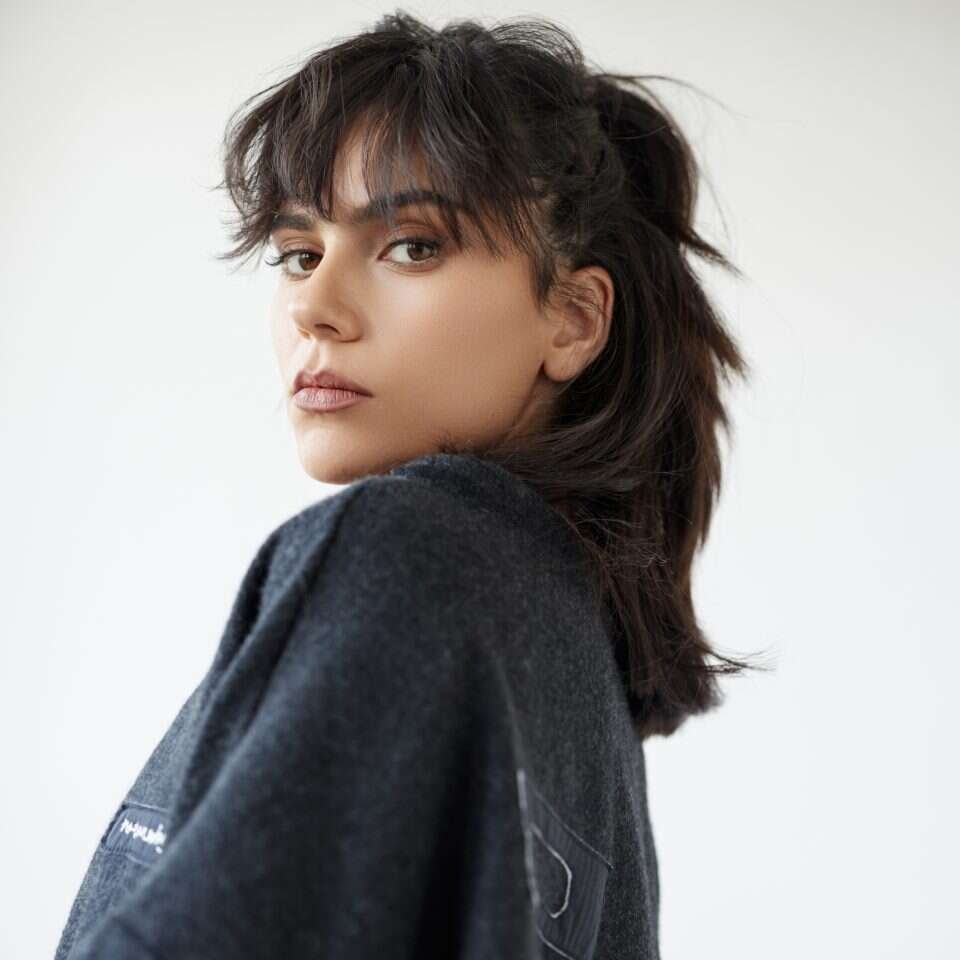

Background information
- Born: April 15, 1995 (age 31); Jerusalem
- Genres: R&B; hip hop; pop; bedroom pop; Mizrahi fusion
- Occupations: Singer; songwriter; rapper; record producer
- Labels: Yahalom; Helicon

Jasmin Moallem (Hebrew: יסמין מועלם; born April 15, 1995) is an Israeli singer, songwriter, rapper and record producer.

== Early life ==
Moallem was born in Jerusalem to a family of Mizrahi Jewish descent. She lived in Portugal from age two to age four. In 2015, she began studying in music schools in London, England, and the United States, and then at the Rimon School of Jazz and Contemporary Music in Israel. In 2018, she competed in Rimon's competition, called "Shirimon," performing "Noetzet Mabat" by Omer Adam. She used a looper while performing and won the first place.

== Career ==
In 2020, she released her debut album, called Arye, through Yahalom Records. The album included the lead single "Mesiba," featuring Israeli rapper Shekel, which became a hit and reached the top of streaming charts in Israel and entered Israeli radio station Galgalatz's playlist.

On December 6, 2021, she released the single "Yehefim", which became a hit and reached the top 10 on the Israeli radio station Galgalatz's year end chart.

On the 30th of May 2023, she released her second studio album, called Ein Olam. The album included the lead single "Tsunami" featuring the Israeli singer Mergui and the single "Yihye Tov" which became a hit and reached the top of the streaming charts in Israel, including Apple Music and Spotify. According to Makor Rishon, this song was considered one of the anthems of the Iron Swords War.

== Discography ==
=== Studio album ===
| Title | Album details |
|---|---|
| אין עולם | Released: May 30, 2023; Label: Yahalom Records, Helicon; Format: Digital download |

| Title | Album details |
|---|---|
| Arye | Released: February 27, 2020; Label: Yahalom Records, Helicon; Format: Digital download |
