= Loai Ali =

Druze-Israeli singer and actor

Loai Ali لؤي علي
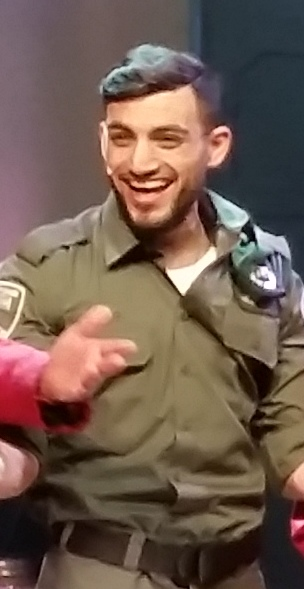

Background information
- Born: January 3, 1992 (age 33); Maghar, Israel

Loai Ali (Arabic: لؤي علي, Hebrew: לואי עלי; born January 3, 1992) is a Druze-Israeli singer and actor.

== Early life ==
Ali was born and raised in Maghar in northern Israel. His father is the journalist Riyad Ali. He served in the Sword Battalion of the IDF.

== Music career ==
At age 21, Ali began to perform at weddings and concerts. In 2016, he participated in the fourth season of the reality show "Eyal Golan is calling for you" (Hebrew: אייל גולן קורא לך) and made it to the quarterfinals. In 2018, he participated in the Israeli national torch-lighting ceremony on Mount Herzl, including performing the Israeli national anthem.

== Personal life ==
Ali is married and lives in Rehovot, Israel. In December 2021, he and his wife had a daughter.
