= Jonathan Mergui =

Israeli singer, actor and dancer

Jonathan Mergui יונתן מרגי
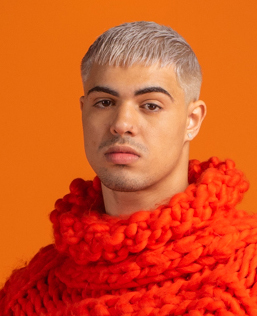
- Mergui in 2020

Background information
- Born: Yehonatan Ya'akov Mergui; 10 February 2000 (age 26); Tel Aviv, Israel
- Genres: Synth-pop; alternative R&B; disco
- Occupations: Singer; dancer; actor
- Years active: 2017–present
- Labels: Gaga Booking; Saban Music Group
- Partner: Anna Zak (December 2023–)

Yehonatan Ya'akov "Jonathan" Mergui (Hebrew: יהונתן יעקב מרגי; born 10 February 2000), also known professionally by his surname Mergui (מרגי), is an Israeli singer, actor and dancer. He attained his fame following his participation on the fifth season of the Israeli reality show Rising Star, where he finished second place in the competition.

== Early and personal life ==
Mergui was born and raised in Tel Aviv, Israel, to an Israeli family of both Sephardi Jewish and Mizrahi Jewish (Moroccan-Jewish and Tunisian-Jewish) descent.

From 2018 to 2021 he was in a relationship with Israeli singer-songwriter and actress Noa Kirel.

In December 2023, he began a relationship with Russian-born Israeli singer and actress Anna Zak.

== Career ==
From 2017 to 2018 he appeared on the Israeli singing reality television show Rising Star. On the "screen level", Mergui sang the song "How Far I'll Go" from the movie Moana, which lifted the screen and won 88%. In February 2018 he qualified for the grand final of the series, he competed against Chen Aharoni, Netta Barzilai and Riki Ben Ari. At the grand final event he won 205 points, trailing at second behind Netta Barzilai – with 250 points.

On September 15, 2019, he released Ma Iyea, his debut EP produced by Johnny Goldstein. It includes the singles "Asur" and "Hakol Shakuff".

== Discography ==
=== EPs ===
- Ma Iyea (2019)
- Lo lihiyot levad (2021)
- Dark Side of The Rainbow (2022)
- Shadows of Blue (2024)
- Nobody Really Knows (2025)
