= Osher Cohen =

Israeli singer and composer

Osher Cohen אושר כהן
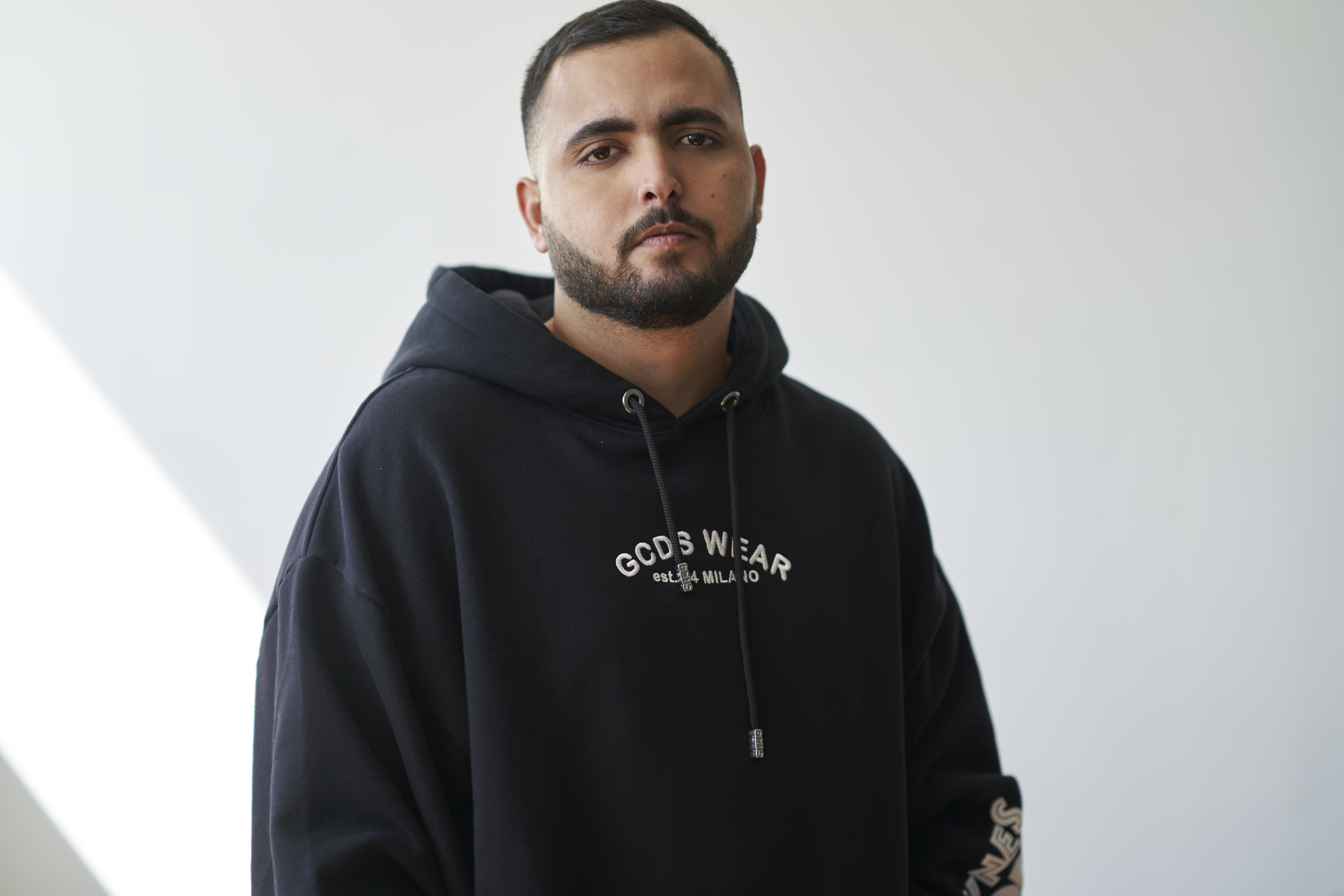

Background information
- Born: 15 December 1998 (age 27); Kiryat Bialik, Israel
- Genres: Mizrahi music, Israeli music, Pop
- Occupations: Singer; lyricist; composer; producer
- Instruments: Electronic keyboard; Baglamas; guitar; clarinet; violin
- Years active: 2018–present
- Labels: P. a. i LTD; Aroma Music; Singold; Play Records

Osher Cohen (Hebrew: אושר כהן; born 15 December 1998) is an Israeli musician, lyricist, and composer.

== Biography ==
Cohen was born in Kiryat Bialik to an observant Jewish family.

From the age of five, he attended a local music school, studying keyboard, piano, Baglamas, guitar, clarinet and violin. At eleven, he started performing as a keyboarder.

In December 2023, Cohen proposed to his girlfriend Sahar Noam. They canceled the engagement after a month. Since 2024, he has been in a relationship with model Eden Fines to whom he got engaged to on 24 September 2025.

== Career ==
In 2018 Cohen released his first album Nizkar Be'einea (Remembering her eyes). Later, In September 2018, he released his single Ba'Regaim She'at Holechet (At the moments you go) which reached 2nd place on Media Forest weekly chart.

Cohen also wrote and composed songs for many singers including Omer Adam, Eyal Golan, Kobi Peretz and more.

Over the years his songs reached high on weekly and annual charts for example: Ahava (1th place on weekly Mako HitList and Galgalatz), Ba'Regaim She'at Holeche (2nd place on weekly Media Forest) and more.

In March 2024, Cohen hosted American boxer Floyd Mayweather Jr. on stage as an act of respect.

== Awards and nominations ==
Year	Award	Category	Nominated work	Result
2022	Frogi Awards	Male Singer of the Year	Himself	Nominated
2022	Frogi Awards	Song of the Year	"Ahuvi Lev Adom" (אהובי לב אדום)	Nominated
2023	Kan Gimel and TikTok Annual Chart	Song of the Year	"Ahava" (אהבה)	2nd place

== Discography ==
=== Studio albums ===
Year	Album title
2018	Nazkar BeEneha (נזכר בעיניה)
2020	Hikitikh Lekha (חיכיתי לך)

=== Extended plays ===
Year	EP title
2023	Osher (אושר)
2023	Part II
2024	The Last Episode
2024	Next Episode
2025	Gitara VeLinshom (גיטרה ולנשום)
2025	Osher Cohen (אושר כהן)
2025	August Dump (אוגוסט דאמפ)
2026	Life Lately
2026	Wedding Songs (Wedding Songs)
