= Eden Hason =

Israeli singer of Mizrahi music

Eden Hason עדן חסון
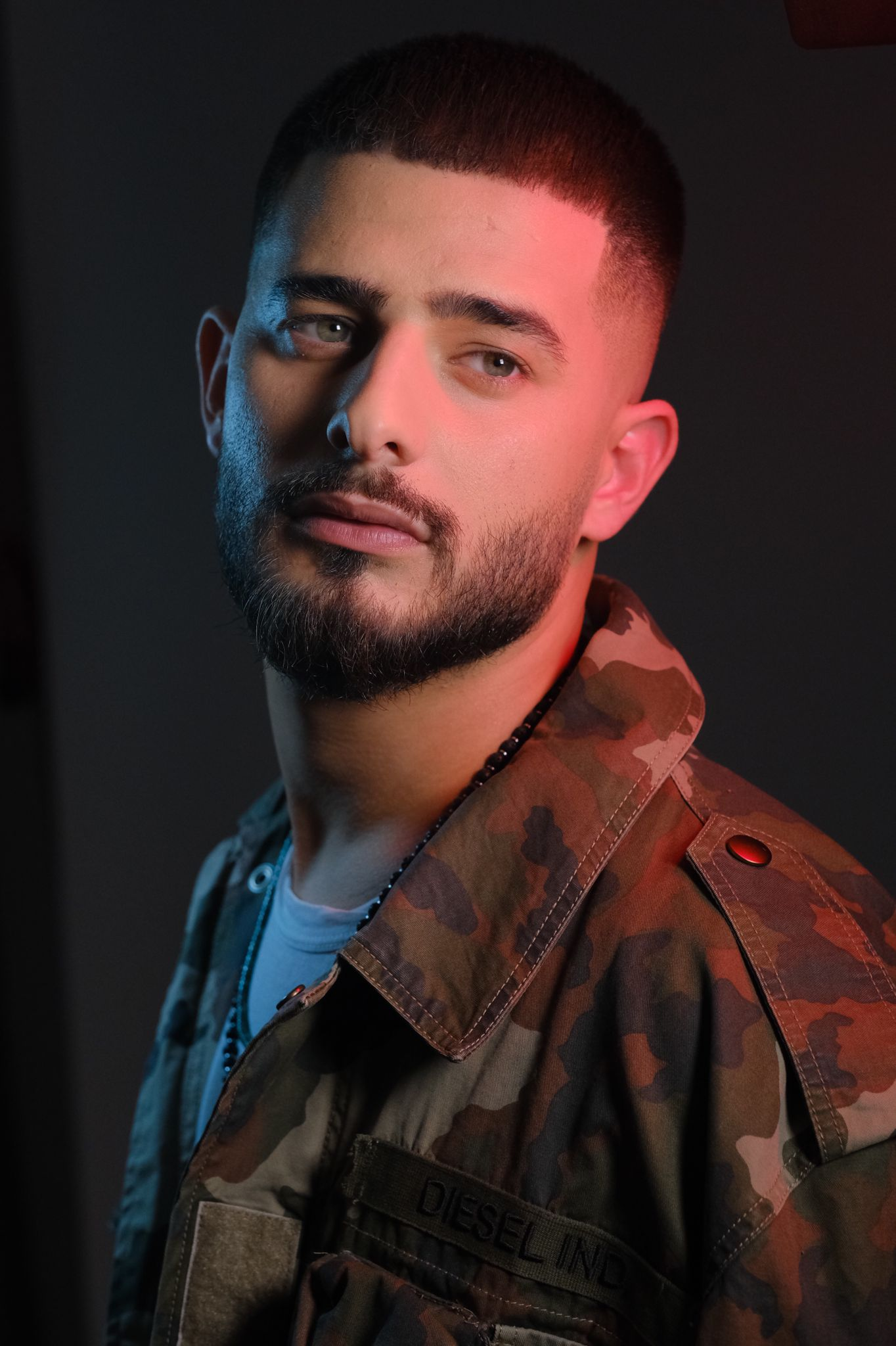

Background information
- Born: August 25, 1994 (age 32); Pardes Hanna-Karkur, Israel
- Origin: Pardes Hanna-Karkur, Israel
- Genres: Pop, Mizrahi pop
- Instruments: Vocals
- Years active: 2017–present
- Labels: Sarit Productions / Roni Meller, Mobile1 Music
- Partner: Yotam Gavriel (November 2024-)

Eden Hason (Hebrew: עדן חסון; born August 25, 1994) is an Israeli singer-songwriter and record producer. Winner of the 2018 ACUM Award for "Song of the Year" for the single "Someone Stop Me"

== Biography ==
Eden Hason was born in Pardes Hanna-Karkur to a religious family of Sephardic roots (Algerian Jewish). His father Yoram is a truck driver, and his mother Esther is a kindergarten teacher. During his military service, he served at the Air Force Base in Mitzpe Ramon, where he was part of an emergency squad.

He auditioned for the 9th season of the Israeli TV song contest "Kokhav Nolad" (A Star is Born). But he did not pass the audition.

In November 2024, Hason came out as homosexual and revealed his partner, Yotam Gavriel, through a song posted on Instagram. Hason lives in Givat Olga.

== Music career ==
He began his musical career in 2015, writing and composing songs for arists such as Pe'er Tasi, Eden Ben Zaken and Itay Levi. On December 24, 2017 he released his debut single "Someone Stop Me". He directed the video clip for the song by himself. The song enjoyed significant success and reached the no. 4 spot on Galgalatz's 2018 annual chart. The song also won ACUM's 2019 "Song of the Year". On April 4, 2019, his debut album was released.

== Discography ==
- Shemishehu Yaatzor Oti (2019)
- Album 2 (2021)
