= The Singer in the Mask season 3 =

The Singer in the Mask
- Season 3
- Starring: Ofira Asayag; Shahar Hason; Tzedi Tzarfati; Static & Ben El Tavori
- Hosted by: Ido Rosenblum; Niv Raskin (episode 4); Assi Azar and Rotem Sela (episode 5)
- Winner: Yael Elkana as "Spider"
- Runner-up: Adi Bity as "Fish"
- No. of episodes: 20

Release
- Original network: Channel 12
- Original release: 17 December 2022 – 18 February 2023

Season chronology
- ← Previous; Season 2 Next → Season 4

The third season of the Israeli version of The Singer in the Mask premiered on Channel 12 on 17 December 2022 and concluded on 18 February 2023. The series was won by actress Yael Elkana as "Spider" with singer Adi Bity finishing second as "Fish" and singer Assaf Amdursky finishing third as "Snail".

== Panelists and host ==
Season 3 panelists and host

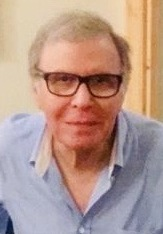
Tzedi Tzarfati

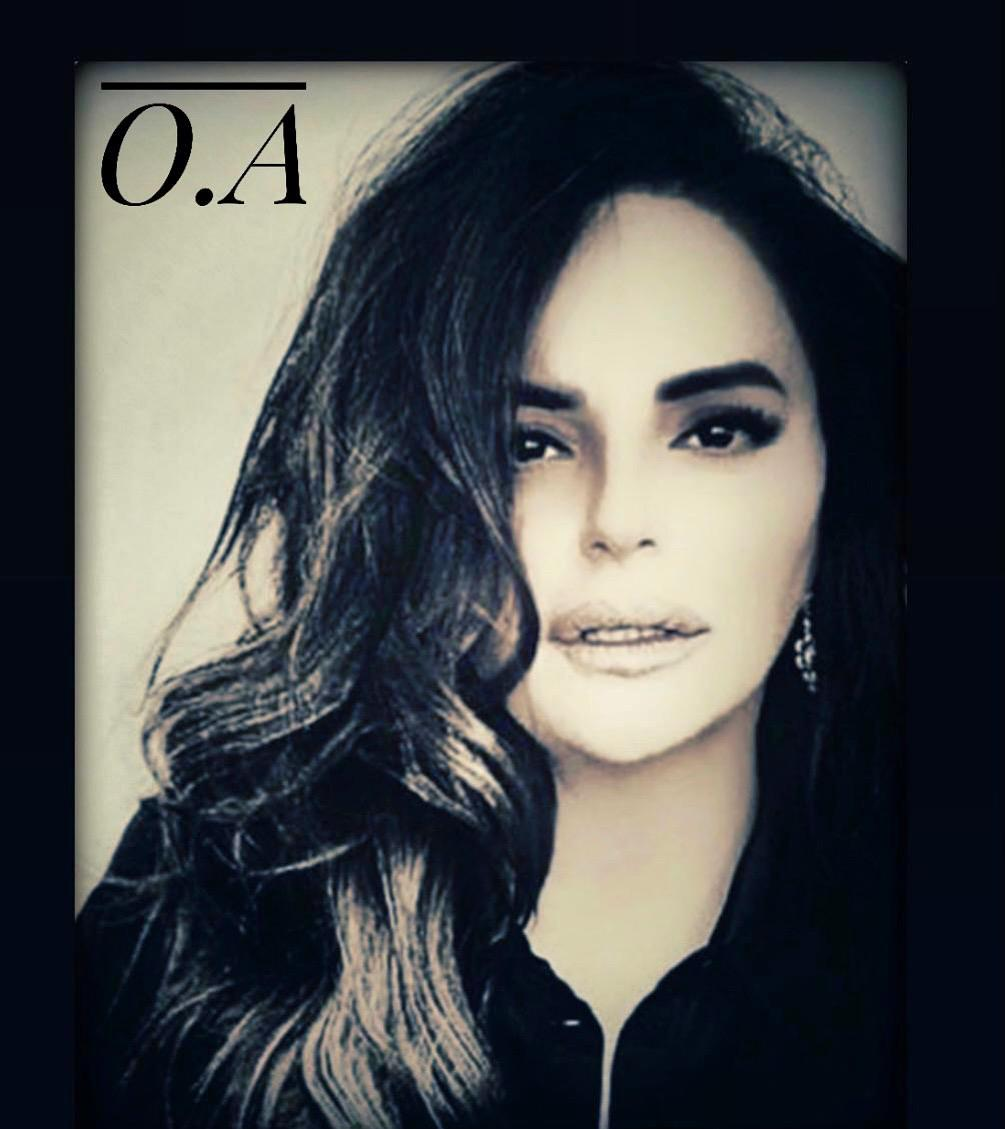
Ofira Asayag

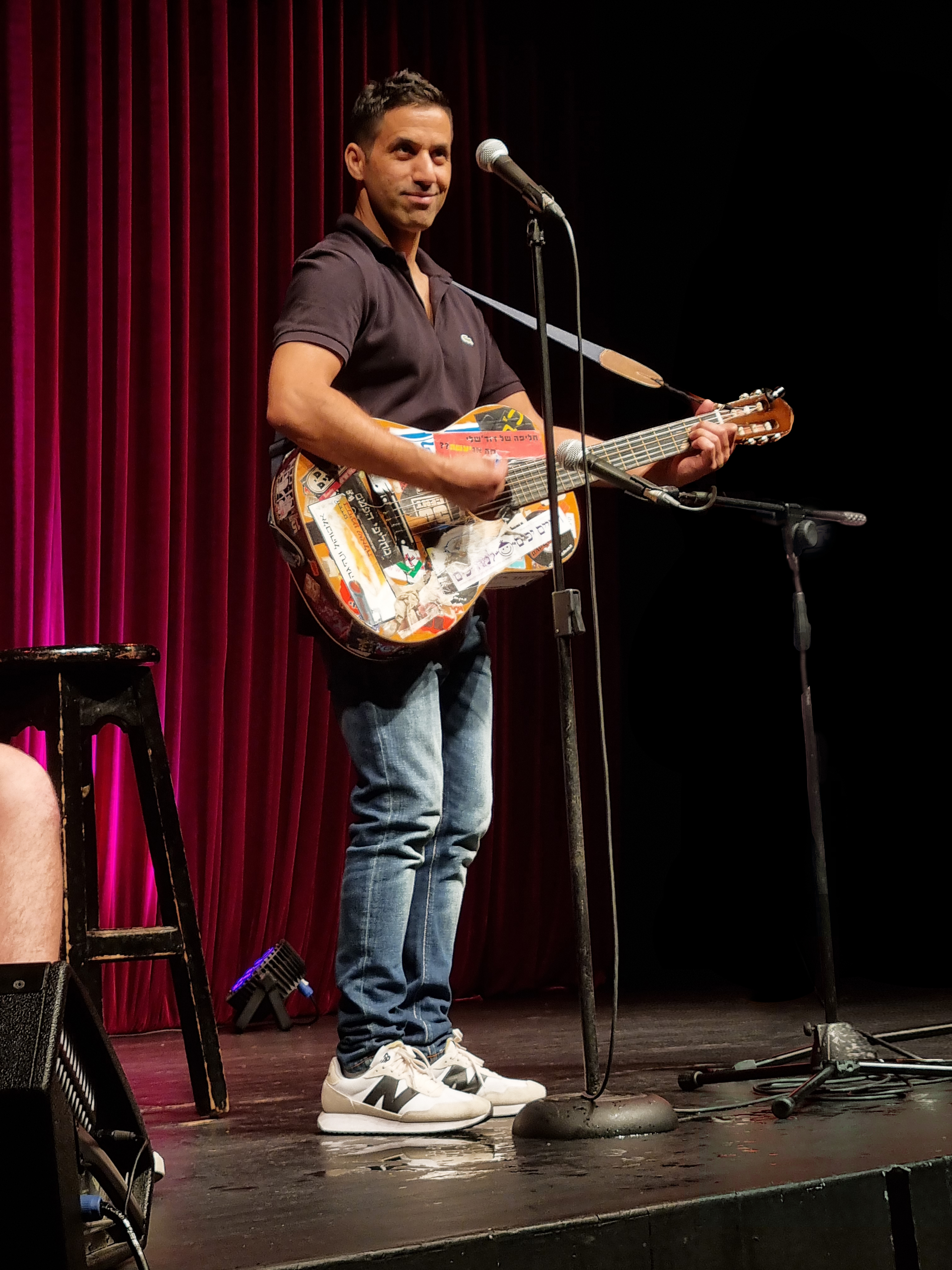
Shahar Hason

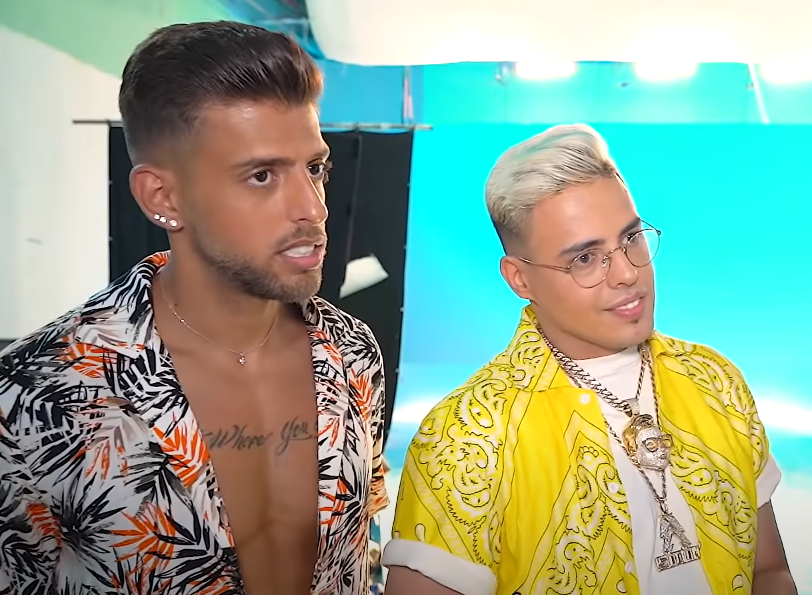
Static & Ben El Tavori

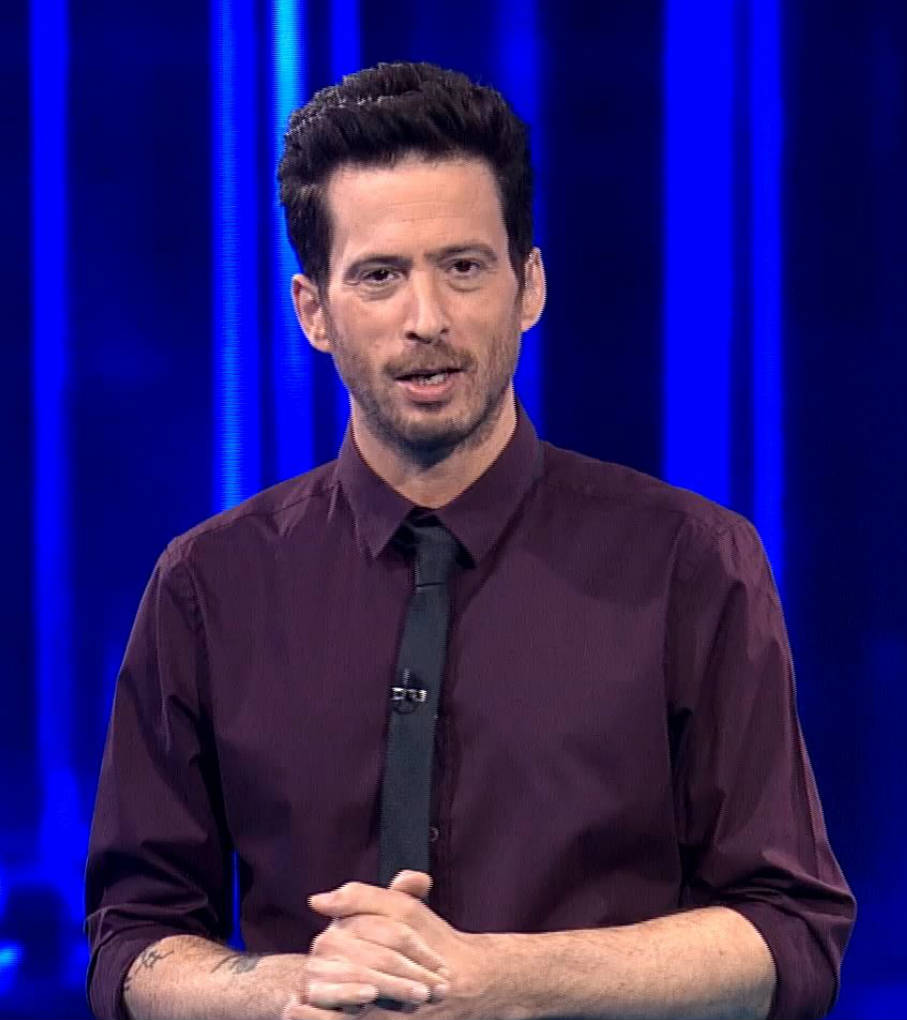
Ido Rosenblum

The show is hosted by television presenter Ido Rosenblum, with the judging panel consisting of journalist Ofira Asayag, the comedian Shahar Hason, musical duo Static & Ben El Tavori, and director Tzedi Tzarfati. In Episodes 4-5 Niv Raskin (episode 4), Assi Azar and Rotem Sela (episode 5) replaced Rozenblum after he got Covid.

=== Guest panelists ===
Throughout the third season, various guest judges appeared alongside the original, for one episode. In episodes 7-8 Assi Azar (episode 7) an Erez Tal (episode 8) replaced Static after he got Covid.

These guest panelists have included:

Episode	Name	Notability
2	Eden Ben Zaken	Singer
3	Guri Alfi	Actor and Comedian
6	Ilanit Levy	Model, Actress and Television Personality
7	Assi Azar	Television Personality
8	Erez Tal	Television Personality
9	Yardena Arazi	Singer
10	Avi Nusbaom	Comedian
11	Neta Alchimister	Model, Swimwear Designer and Social Media Personality
12	Lior Ashkenazi	Actor, Comedian and Television Presenter
15	Hanoch Daum	Journalist
16	Michal Daliot	Teaching and Education Personality
17	Guy Pines	TV Host
18	Yael Bar Zohar	Model, Singer, Actress and TV Host
19	Rafi Ginat	Former CEO of Channel 10, Journalist, Singer, Producer and TV and Radio Host
20	Hanan Ben Ari	Singer-songwriter

== Contestants ==
Stage Name	Celebrity	Occupation	Episodes																			
Stage Name	Celebrity	Occupation	1	2	3	4	5	6	7	8	9	10	11	12	13/14	15	16	17	18	19	20	
Stage Name	Celebrity	Occupation	Group A			Group B			Group C			A	B	C	13/14	15	16	17	18	19	A	B
Spider	Yael Elkana	Actress	SAFE	SAFE	SAFE							SAFE			SAFE	SAFE		SAFE		SAFE	SAFE	WINNER
Fish	Adi Bity	Singer				SAFE	SAFE	SAFE					SAFE		SAFE		SAFE		SAFE	SAFE	SAFE	RUNNER-UP
Snail	Assaf Amdursky	Singer	SAFE	SAFE	SAFE							SAFE			SAFE		SAFE		SAFE	SAFE	THIRD	
Hippo	Ben Artzi	Singer				SAFE	SAFE	SAFE					SAFE		SAFE	SAFE		SAFE		OUT		
Mosquito	Eliraz Sade	TV Host							SAFE	SAFE	SAFE			SAFE	SAFE		SAFE		OUT			
Cotton Candy	Ilanit Levy	Model	SAFE	SAFE	SAFE							SAFE			SAFE	SAFE		OUT				
King & Queen	Tal Mosseri	Actor							SAFE	SAFE	SAFE			SAFE	SAFE		OUT					
King & Queen	Michal Yannai	Actress							SAFE	SAFE	SAFE			SAFE	SAFE		OUT					
Artichoke	Linoy Ashram	Rhythmic gymnast				SAFE	SAFE	SAFE					SAFE		SAFE	OUT						
Hamsa	Shani Klein	Actress							SAFE	SAFE	SAFE			SAFE	OUT							
Owl	Meir Adoni	Chef							SAFE	SAFE	SAFE			OUT								
Peacock	Erez Tal	TV Host				SAVED	SAFE	SAFE					OUT									
Pineapple	Ruslana Rodina	Model	SAFE	SAFE	SAFE							OUT										
Chick	Dafna Armoni	Singer							SAFE	SAFE	OUT											
Coral	Dudu Fisher	Cantor							SAFE	OUT												
Robot	Sarit Polak	Events producer				SAFE	SAFE	OUT														
Sheep	Asher Swissa	DJ				SAFE	OUT															
Cat	Boaz Bismuth	Journalist	SAFE	SAFE	OUT																	
Frog	Yoram Arbel	TV Presenter	OUT																			

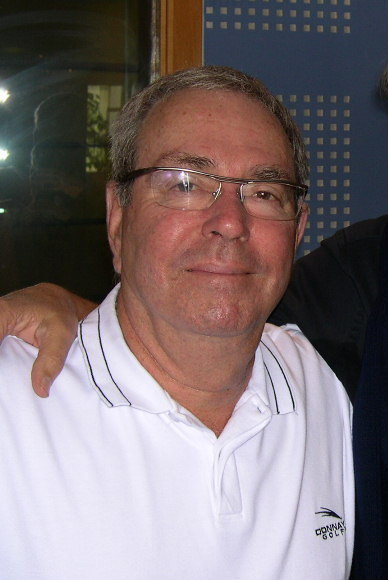
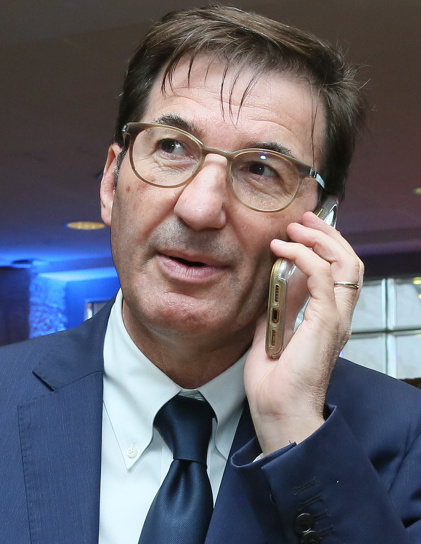
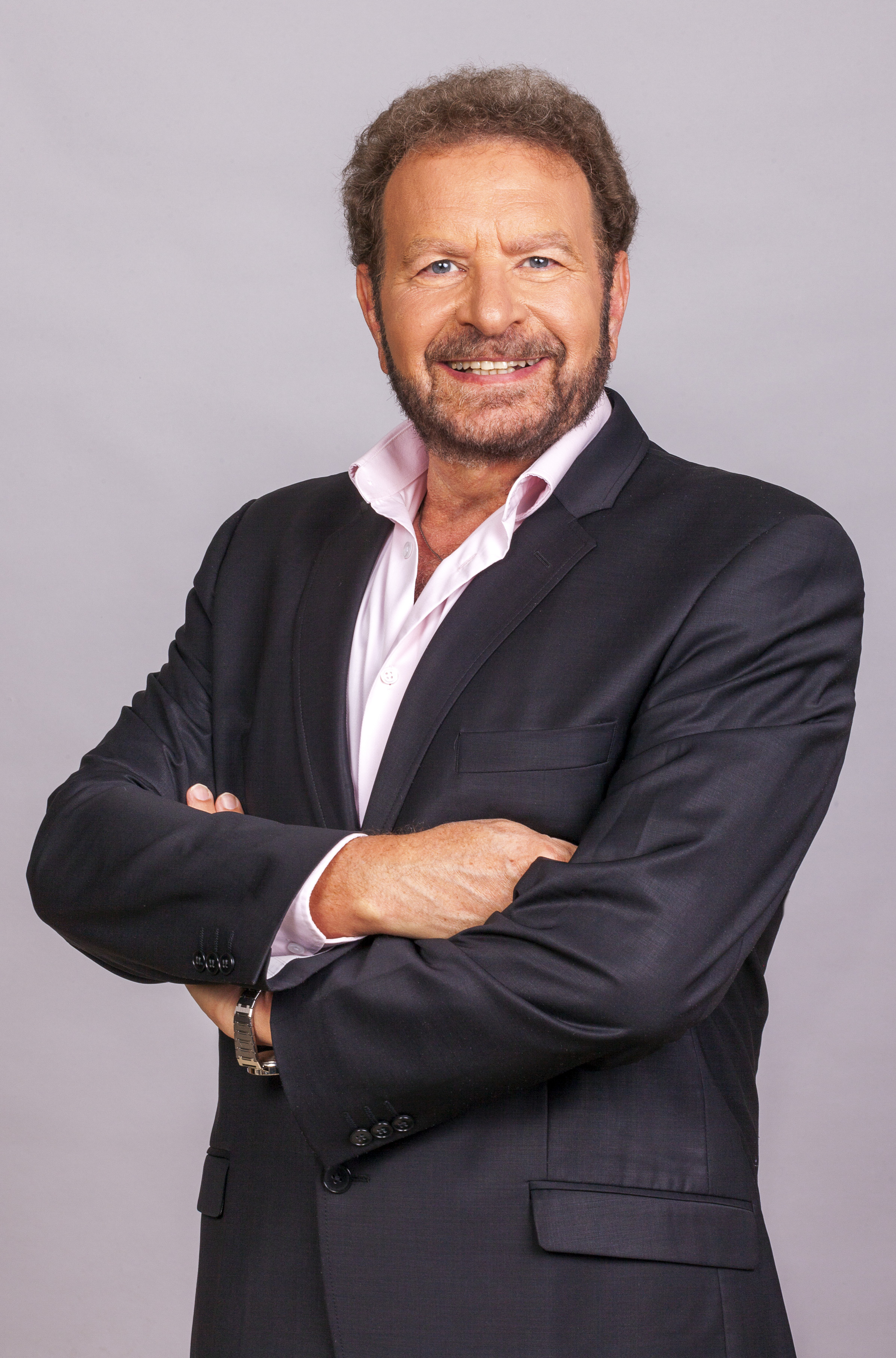
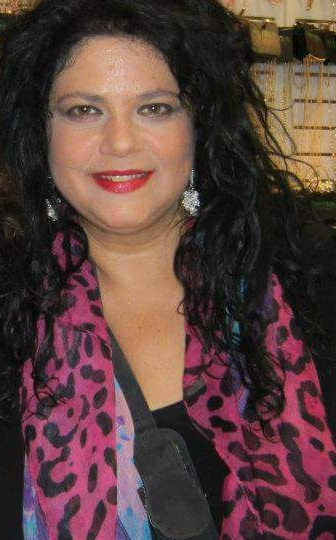
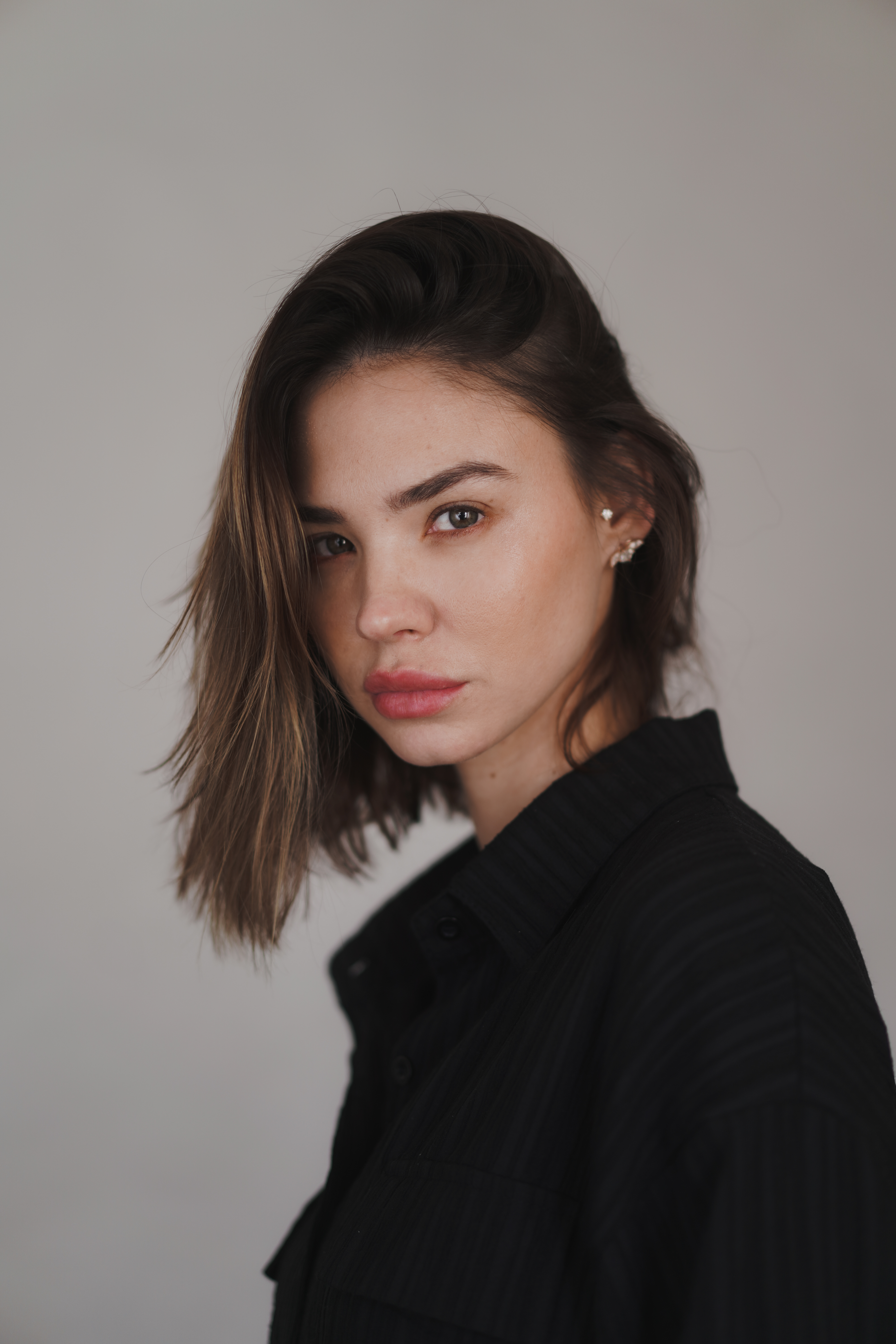
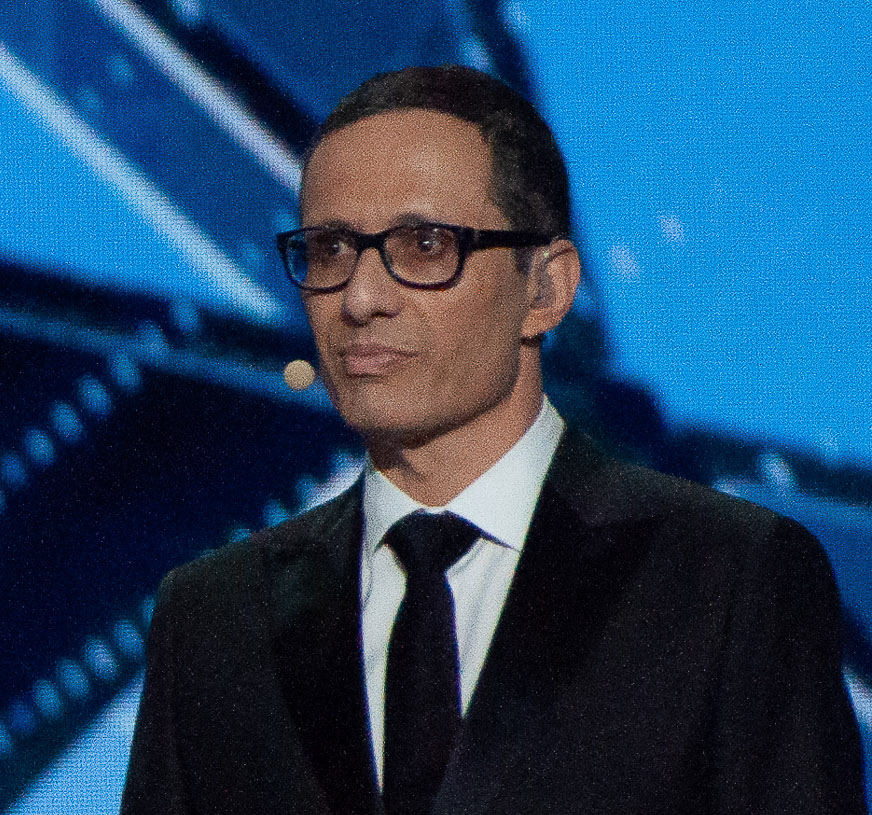
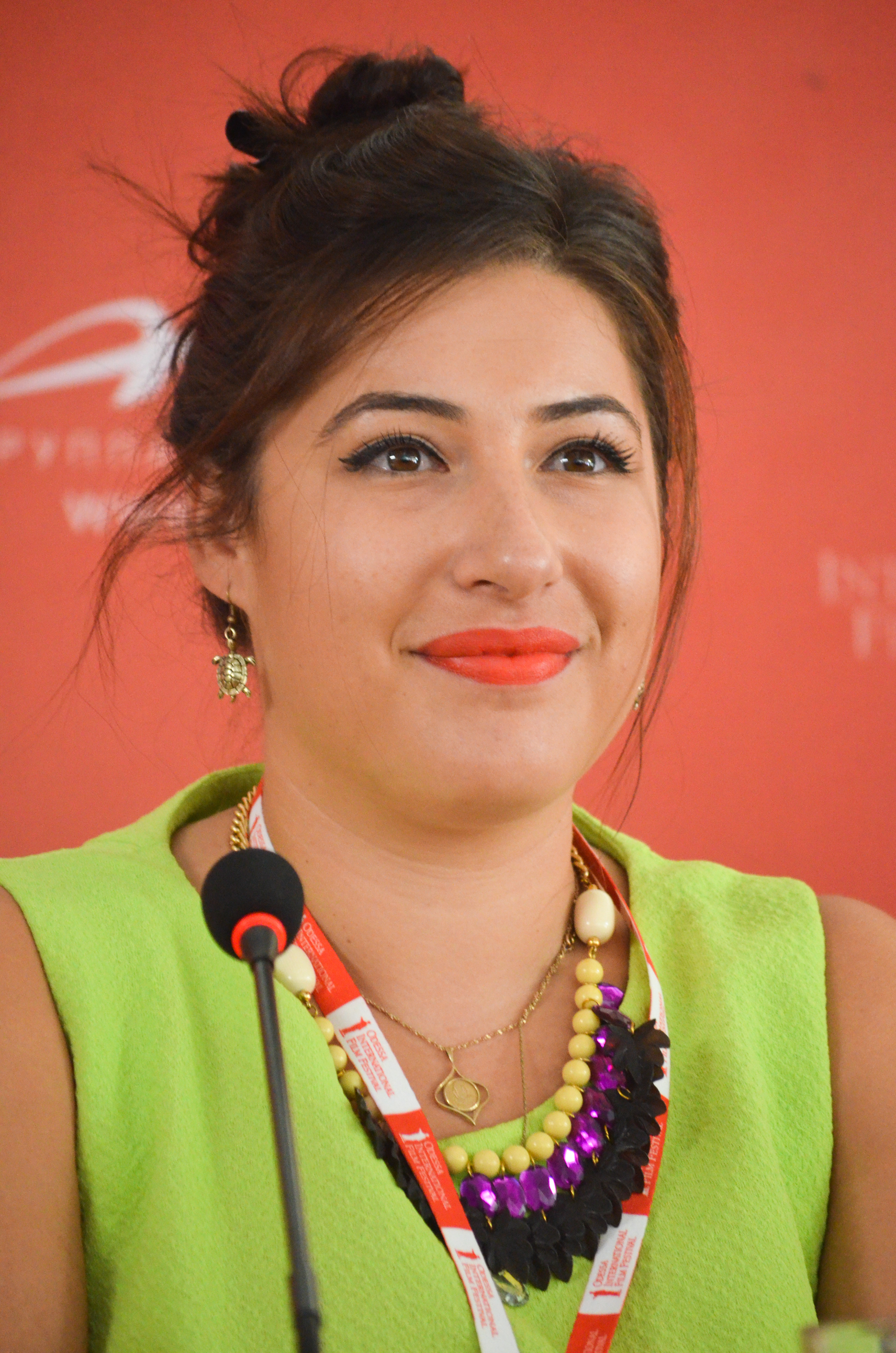
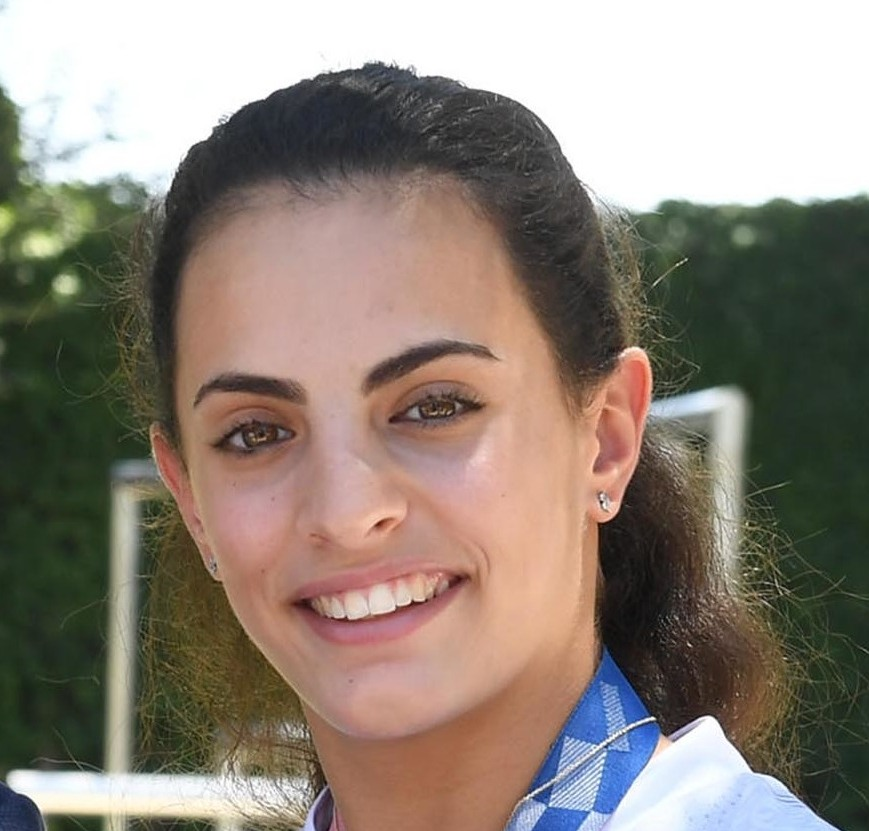
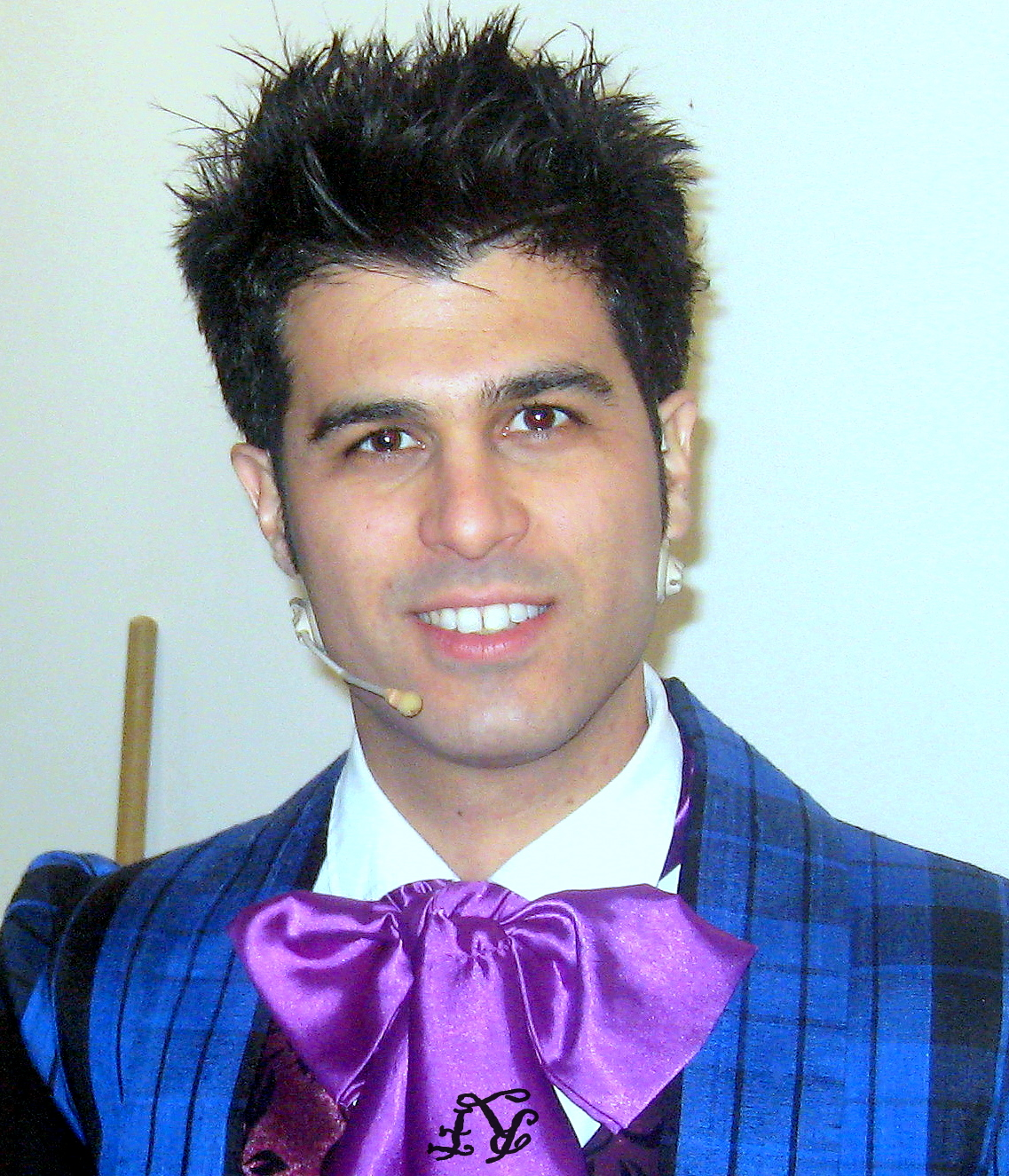
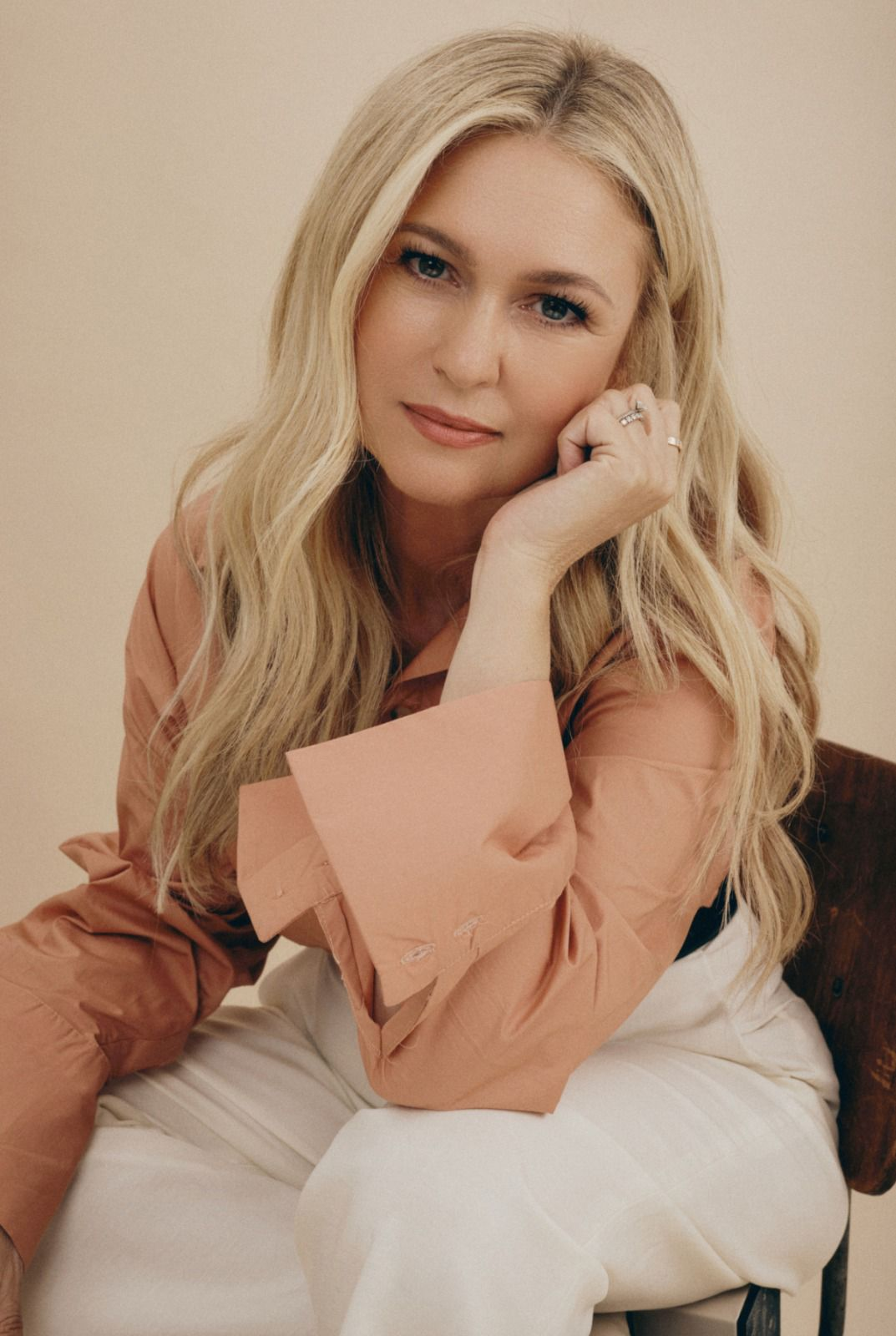
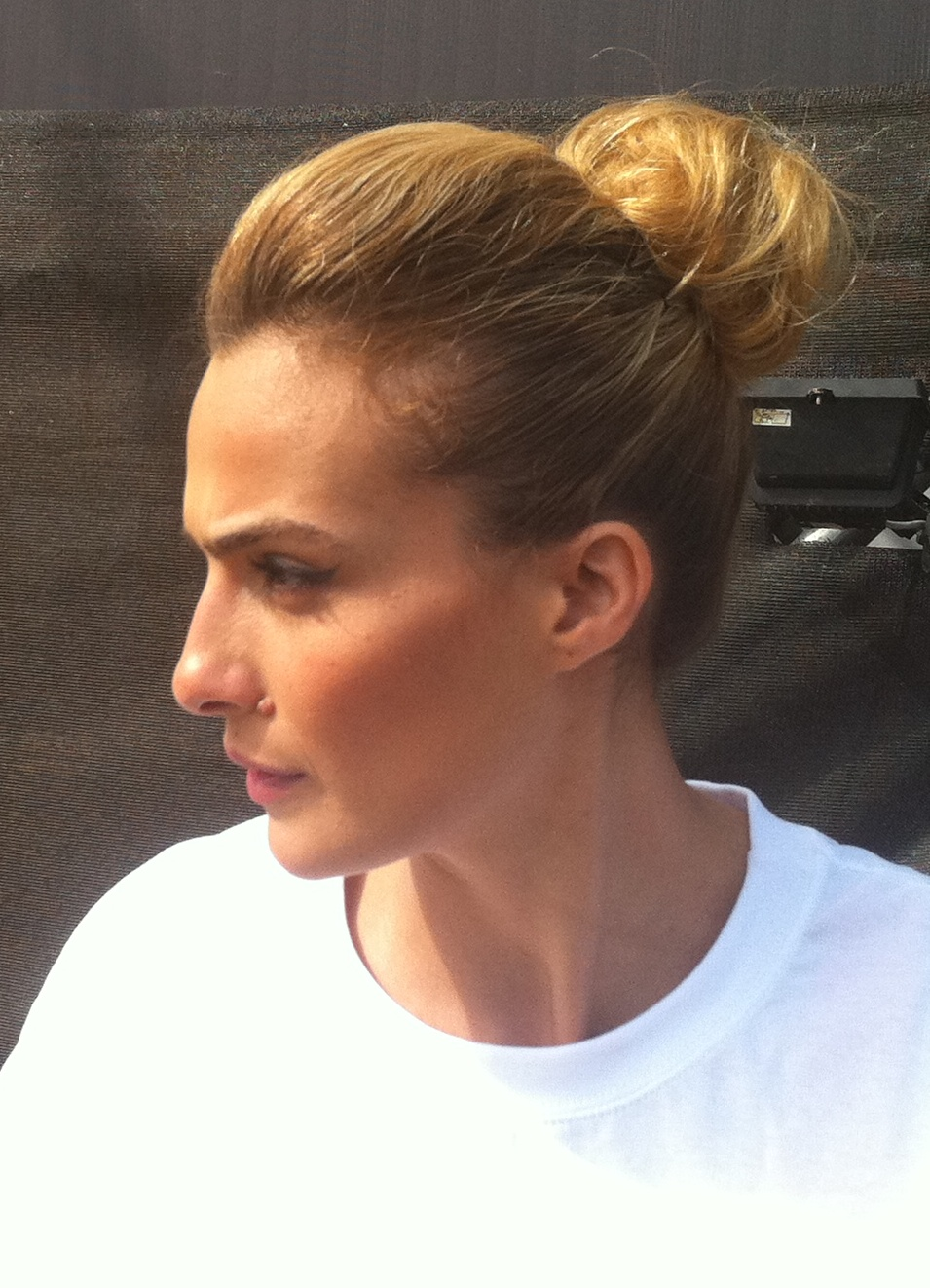
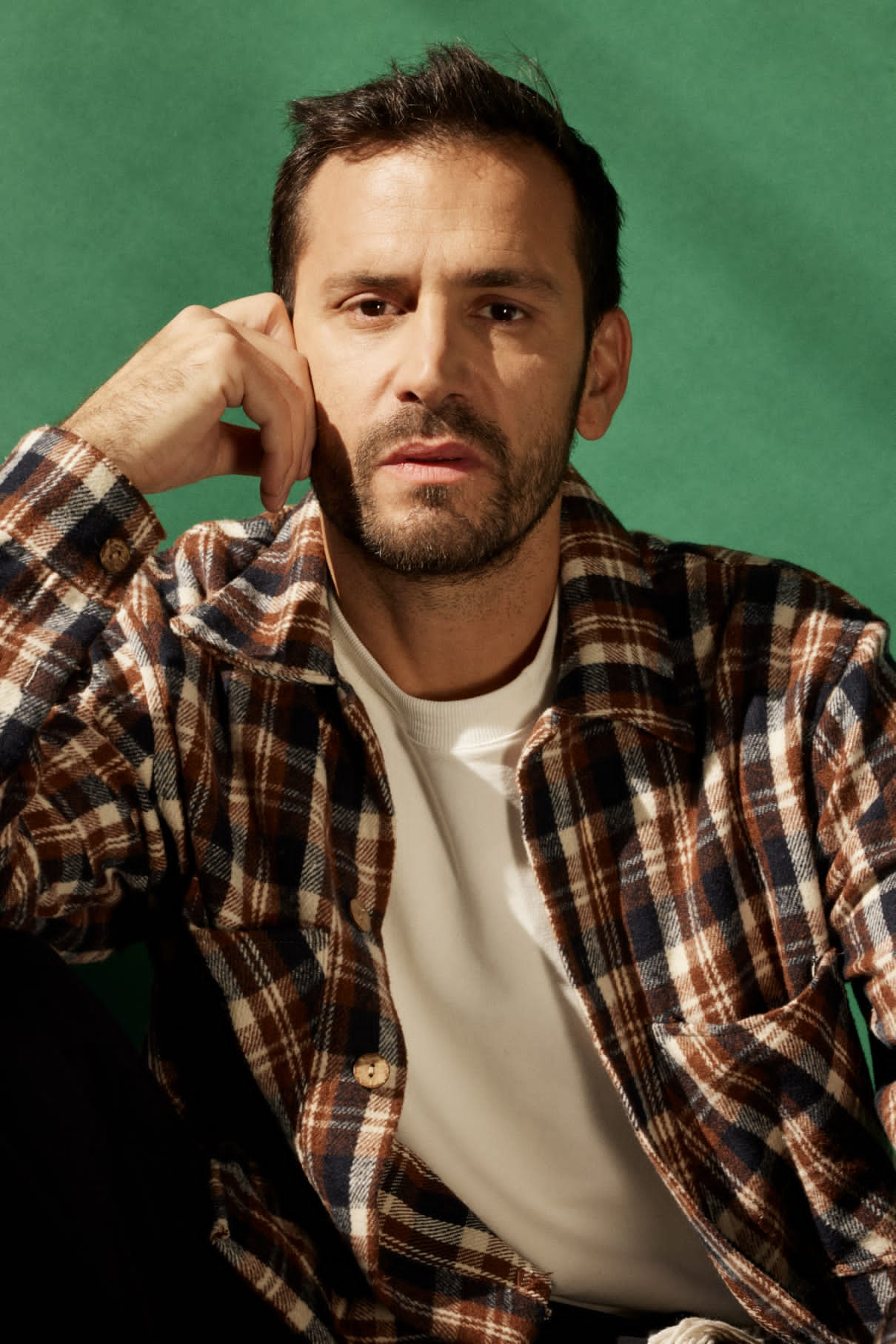
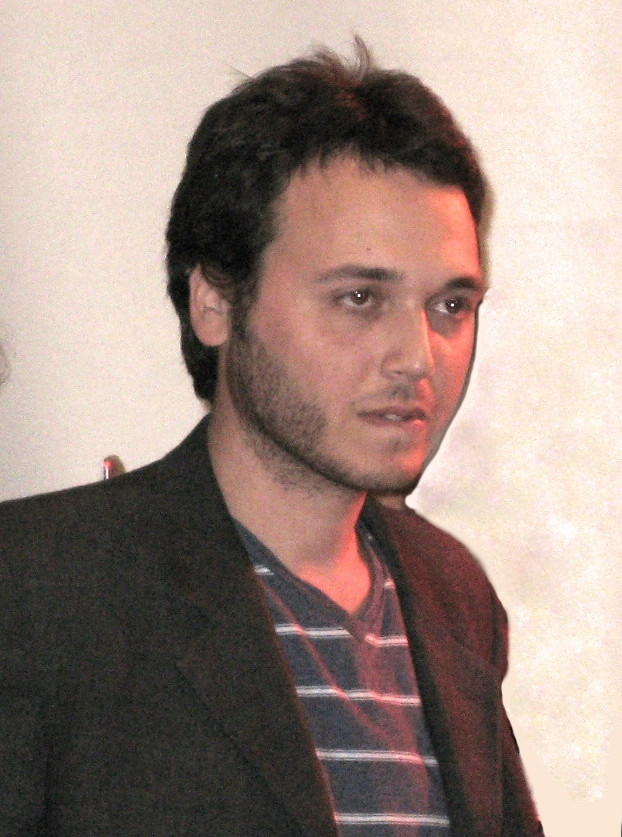
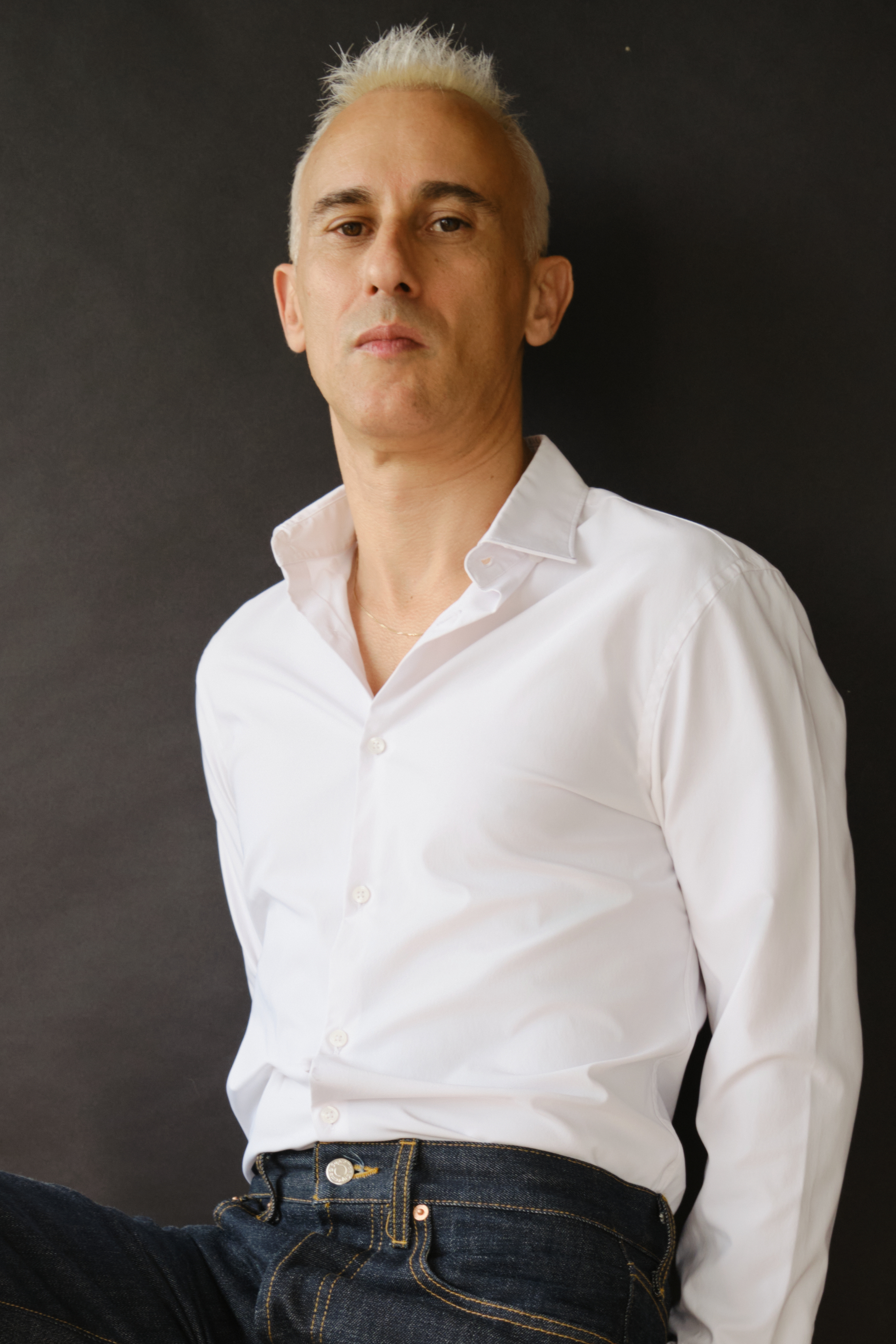
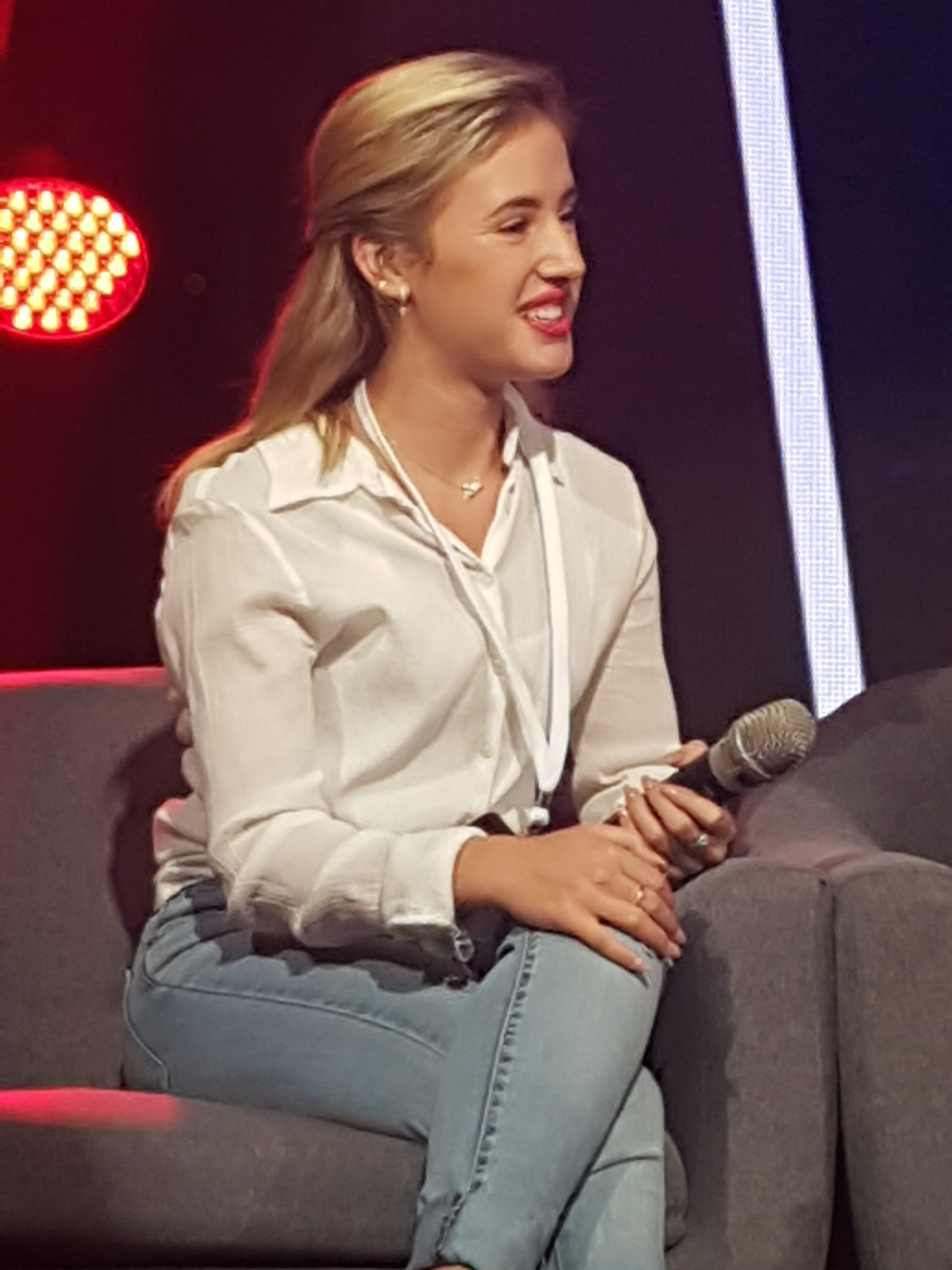
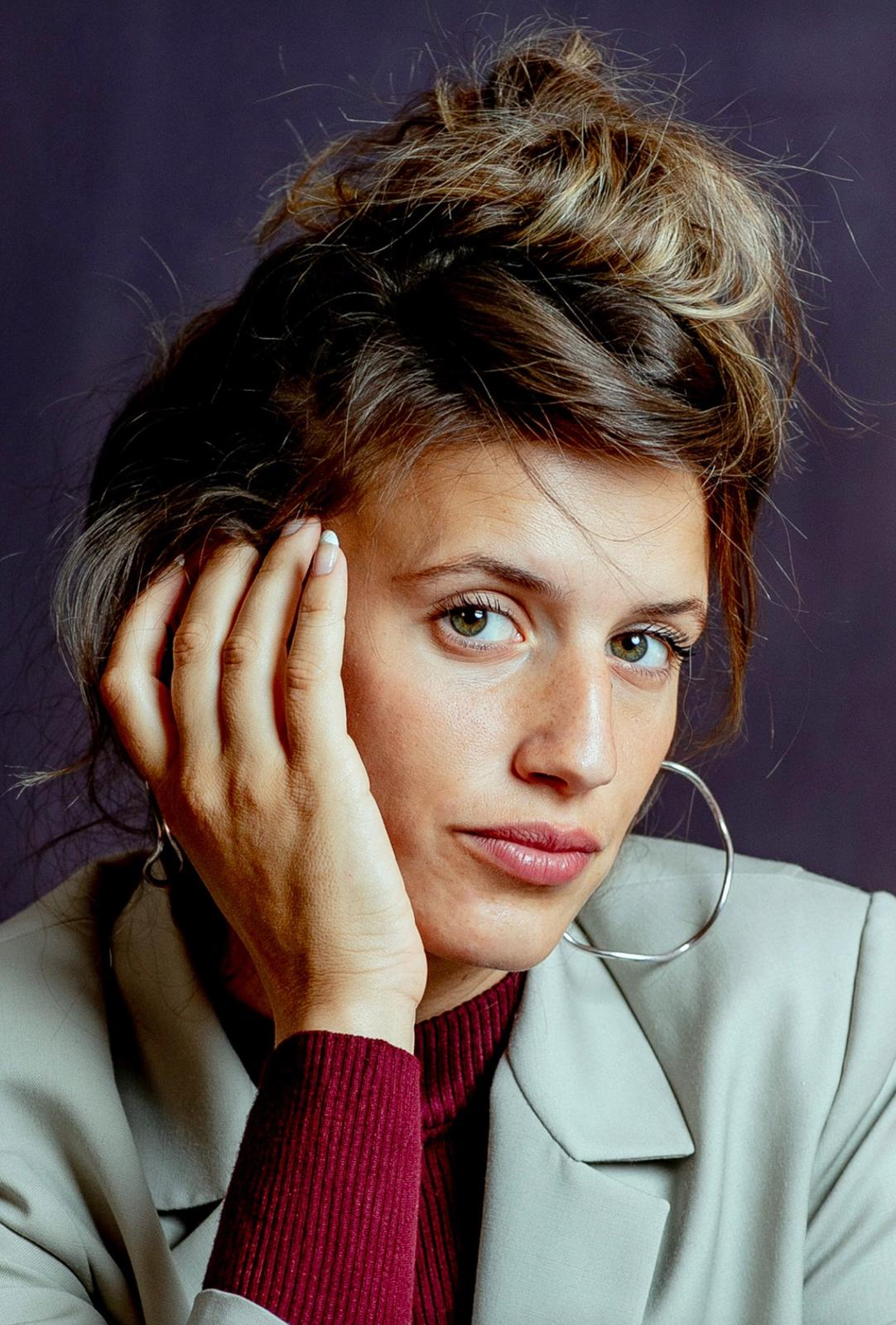
The celebrities who competed in the third season of The Singer in the Mask, pictured in order of elimination (l-r):

Yoram Arbel ("Frog"), Boaz Bismuth ("Cat"), Dudu Fisher ("Coral"), Dafna Armoni ("Chick"), Ruslana Rodina ("Pineapple"), Erez Tal ("Peacock"), Shani Klein ("Hamsa"), Linoy Ashram ("Artichoke"), Tal Mosseri ("King"), Michal Yannai ("Queen"), Ilanit Levy ("Cotton Candy"), Eliraz Sade ("Mosquito"), Ben Artzi ("Hippo"), Assaf Amdursky ("Snail"), Adi Bity ("Fish"), Yael Elkana ("Spider")

Not pictured: Asher Swisa ("Sheep"), Sarit Polak ("Robot"), Meir Adoni ("Owl")

== Episodes ==
=== Week 1 (December 17/19) (Note: The voting took place in episode 3 as the contestants have all performed. Additional voting for the other five masks of the group took place in episode 4 after all contestants have performed.) ===
Guest Performance: "Love Runs Out" by OneRepublic performed by Shay Gabso as "Gorilla" and Ido Rosenblum as "Rooster"

Performances on the first episode
#	Stage name	Song	Identity	Result
1	Spider	"Industry Baby" by Lil Nas X and Jack Harlow	undisclosed	SAFE
2	Snail	"Stay" by The Kid LAROI and Justin Bieber	undisclosed	SAFE
3	Cotton Candy	"Levitating" by Dua Lipa ft. DaBaby	undisclosed	SAFE
4	Cat	"Scream & Shout" by will.i.am and Britney Spears	undisclosed	SAFE
5	Pineapple	"Hot Stuff" by Donna Summer	undisclosed	SAFE
6	Frog	"Señorita" by Camila Cabello & Shawn Mendes	Yoram Arbel	OUT

Performances on the second episode
#	Stage name	Song	Identity	Result
1	Cotton Candy	"Into You" by Ariana Grande (duet with Eden Ben Zaken)	undisclosed	SAFE
2	Spider	"מנגינה" by Eden Ben Zaken (duet with Eden Ben Zaken)	undisclosed	SAFE
3	Snail	"Save Your Tears" by The Weeknd (duet with Eden Ben Zaken)	undisclosed	SAFE
4	Cat	"מועבט" by Eden Ben Zaken & Itay Galo (duet with Eden Ben Zaken)	undisclosed	SAFE
5	Pineapple	"Hips Dont Lie" by Shakira (duet with Eden Ben Zaken)	undisclosed	SAFE

=== Week 2 (December 24/26) ===
Performances on the third episode
#	Stage name	Song	Identity	Result
1	Pineapple	"Mamma Mia" by ABBA	undisclosed	SAFE
2	Snail	"How Far I'll Go" by Auliʻi Cravalho	undisclosed	SAFE
3	Cotton Candy	"Fame" by Irene Cara	undisclosed	SAFE
4	Cat	"Oh, Pretty Woman" by Roy Orbison	Boaz Bismuth	OUT
5	Spider	"When You Believe" by Mariah Carey and Whitney Houston	undisclosed	SAFE

Performances on the fourth episode
#	Stage name	Song	Identity	Result
1	Fish	"It's Raining Men" by The Weather Girls	undisclosed	SAFE
2	Hippo	"24K Magic" by Bruno Mars	undisclosed	SAFE
3	Sheep	"לעוף" by Harel Skaat	undisclosed	SAFE
4	Robot	"Me Too" by Meghan Trainor	undisclosed	SAFE
5	Artichoke	“יהלום” by Agam Buchbut	undisclosed	SAFE
6	Peacock	"Viva la Vida" by Coldplay	undisclosed	SAVED (Note: The panel were challenged to guess Peacock's identity, which they incorrectly guessed Yisrael Aharoni. As they failed their challenge, Peacock was allowed to remain in the competition.)

=== Week 3 (December 31/January 2/3) ===
Performances on the fifth episode
#	Stage name	Song	Identity	Result
1	Fish	"Chandelier" by Sia	undisclosed	SAFE
2	Sheep	"Swalla" by Jason Derulo	Asher Swissa	OUT
3	Hippo	"Attention" by Charlie Puth	undisclosed	SAFE
4	Artichoke	"Girl on Fire" by Alicia Keys	undisclosed	SAFE
5	Robot	"Sweet but Psycho" by Ava Max	undisclosed	SAFE
6	Peacock	"Watermelon Sugar" by Harry Styles	undisclosed	SAFE

Performances on the sixth episode
#	Stage name	Song	Identity	Result
1	Hippo	"Stop Crying Your Heart Out" by Oasis	undisclosed	SAFE
2	Artichoke	"Don't Speak" by No Doubt	undisclosed	SAFE
3	Fish	"November Rain" by Guns N' Roses	undisclosed	SAFE
4	Peacock	"Smells Like Teen Spirit" by Nirvana	undisclosed	SAFE
5	Robot	"Let It Be" by The Beatles	Sarit Polak	OUT

Performances on the seventh episode
#	Stage name	Song	Identity	Result
1	Hamsa	"Only Girl (In The World)" by Rihanna	undisclosed	SAFE
2	Owl	“דרך השלום” by Pe'er Tasi	undisclosed	SAFE
3	Chick	"Dance Monkey" by Tones and I	undisclosed	SAFE
4	Mosquito	"Treat You Better" by Shawn Mendes	undisclosed	SAFE
5	Coral	"I Will Survive" by Gloria Gaynor	undisclosed	SAFE
6	King & Queen	"Brividi" by Blanco and Mahmood	undisclosed	SAFE

=== Week 4 (January 7/9) ===
Performances on the eighth episode
#	Stage name	Song	Identity	Result
1	Chick	"Feel It Still" by Portugal. The Man	undisclosed	SAFE
2	Hamsa	"Titanium" by David Guetta feat. Sia	undisclosed	SAFE
3	King & Queen	"Because You Loved Me" by Celine Dion	undisclosed	SAFE
4	Mosquito	"Bella" by Static & Ben El Tavori	undisclosed	SAFE
5	Owl	“זיקוקים” by Moshe Peretz	undisclosed	SAFE
6	Coral	"Beggin'" by Måneskin	Dudu Fisher	OUT

Performances on the ninth episode
#	Stage name	Song	Identity	Result
1	Hamsa	"Hero" by Mariah Carey	undisclosed	SAFE
2	Chick	"Lady Marmalade" by Labelle	Dafna Armoni	OUT
3	King & Queen	"How Will I Know" by Whitney Houston	undisclosed	SAFE
4	Owl	"בוא" by Rita	undisclosed	SAFE
5	Mosquito	"You're Still the One" by Shania Twain	undisclosed	SAFE

=== Week 5 (January 14/16) ===
Performances on the tenth episode
#	Stage name	Song	Identity	Result
1	Spider	"Wings" by Little Mix	undisclosed	SAFE
2	Pineapple	"Faded" by Alan Walker	Ruslana Rodina	OUT
3	Snail	"Love on the Brain" by Rihanna	undisclosed	SAFE
4	Cotton Candy	"Unstoppable" by Sia	undisclosed	SAFE

Performances on the eleventh episode
#	Stage name	Song	Identity	Result
1	Fish	"Telephone" by Lady Gaga & Beyoncé	undisclosed	SAFE
2	Hippo	"Kiss" by Prince	undisclosed	SAFE
3	Artichoke	”לך לישון" by Anna Zak	undisclosed	SAFE
4	Peacock	"Sugar" by Maroon 5	Erez Tal	OUT

=== Week 6 (January 21) ===
Performances on the twelfth episode
#	Stage name	Song	Identity	Result
1	Mosquito	"Love Me Again" by John Newman	undisclosed	SAFE
2	Hamsa	"Whats Up?" by 4 Non Blondes	undisclosed	SAFE
3	King & Queen	"Thought About That" by Noa Kirel	undisclosed	SAFE
4	Owl	"לא להיות לבד" by Inbal Paz	Meir Adoni	OUT

=== Week 7 (January 25/28) ===
Performances on the thirteenth and fourteenth episode
Ep.	#	Stage name	Song	Identity	Result
13	1	Spider	"חצי דפוק" by Omer Adam	undisclosed	SAFE
13	2	Hippo	"Thriller" by Michael Jackson	undisclosed	SAFE
13	3	Hamsa	"Material Girl" by Madonna	Shani Klein	OUT
13	4	Mosquito	"Shape of You" by Ed Sheeran	undisclosed	SAFE
13	5	Fish	"Somebody to Love" by Queen	undisclosed	SAFE
14	6	Cotton Candy	"... Baby One More Time" by Britney Spears	undisclosed	SAFE
14	7	King & Queen	"Poker Face" by Lady Gaga	undisclosed	SAFE
14	8	Snail	"Dynamite" by BTS	undisclosed	SAFE
14	9	Artichoke	"ליבינג דה דרים" by Nunu	undisclosed	SAFE

=== Week 8 (January 29/February 4) ===
Performances on the fifteenth episode
#	Stage name	Song	Identity	Result
1	Artichoke	"Because of You" by Kelly Clarkson	Linoy Ashram	OUT
2	Hippo	"Sign of the Times" by Harry Styles	undisclosed	SAFE
3	Spider	"End of Time" by Beyoncé	undisclosed	SAFE
4	Cotton Candy	"Hurt" by Christina Aguilera	undisclosed	SAFE

Performances on the sixteenth episode
#	Stage name	Song	Identity	Result
1	Fish	"You & I" by One Direction	undisclosed	SAFE
2	Snail	"That's What I Like" by Bruno Mars	undisclosed	SAFE
3	Mosquito	"Counting Stars" by OneRepublic	undisclosed	SAFE
4	King & Queen	“I Still Haven't Found What I'm Looking For” by U2	Tal Mosseri & Michal Yannai	OUT

=== Week 9 (February 6/11) ===
Performances on the seventeenth episode
#	Stage name	Song	Identity	Result
1	Hippo	"Goodbye Yellow Brick Road" by Elton John	undisclosed	SAFE
2	Cotton Candy	"New Rules" by Dua Lipa	Ilanit Levy	OUT
3	Spider	"Irreplaceable" by Beyoncé	undisclosed	SAFE

Performances on the eighteenth episode
#	Stage name	Song	Identity	Result
1	Fish	"A Thousand Years" by Christina Perri	undisclosed	SAFE
2	Snail	"Everybody (Backstreet's Back)" by Backstreet Boys	undisclosed	SAFE
3	Mosquito	"Angels" by Robbie Williams	Eliraz Sade	OUT
4	Bonnet	"Eye of the Tiger" by Survivor	Rafi Ginat	GUEST

=== Week 10 - Semifinal & Final (February 14/18) ===
Performances on the nineteenth episode
#	Stage name	Song	Identity	Result
1	Hippo	"Can't Feel My Face" by The Weeknd	Ben Artzi	OUT
2	Fish	"Love on Top" by Beyoncé	undisclosed	SAFE
3	Snail	"As It Was" by Harry Styles	undisclosed	SAFE
4	Spider	"Lonely" by Justin Bieber and Benny Blanco	undisclosed	SAFE

Performances on the final episode
#	Stage name	Song	Identity	Result
Round One
1	Spider	"Can't Hold Us" by Macklemore & Ryan Lewis	undisclosed	SAFE
2	Snail	"Finally" by CeCe Peniston	Assaf Amdursky	THIRD
3	Fish	"Bootylicious" by Destiny's Child	undisclosed	SAFE
Round Two
1	Fish	"All I Ask" by Adele	Adi Bity	RUNNER-UP
2	Spider	"Bohemian Rhapsody" by Queen	Yael Elkana	WINNER
