= Ro'im et Hakol season 2 =

Television game show season

Ro'im et Hakol
- Season 2
- Starring: Ilanit Levi; Shiri Maimon; Avi Nussbaum; Ido Rosenblum
- Hosted by: Erez Tal
- Winners: Good singers: 2; Bad singers: 2
- No. of episodes: 4

Release
- Original network: Keshet 12
- Original release: 14 August – 17 September 2023

Season chronology
- ← Previous; Season 1

The second season of the Israeli television mystery music game show Ro'im et Hakol premiered on Keshet 12 on 14 August 2023. (Note: Originally a continuation of its 1st season, in which the 21 March 2023 episode was replaced by continuing a 5th season of Ninja Israel, sources from Mako formally designated the remaining three episodes from the previous as a separate season.)

== Gameplay ==
=== Format ===
According to the original South Korean rules, the guest artist must attempt to eliminate bad singers during its game phase. At the final performance, the last remaining mystery singer is revealed as either good or bad by means of a duet between them and one of the guest artists.

If the last remaining mystery singer is good, they are granted to release its own digital single; if a singer is bad, they win ₪20,000.

=== Rounds ===
1. First impression (Hebrew: רושם ראשוני)
  The guest artist is given some time to observe and examine each mystery singer based on their appearance.
2. Lip sync (Hebrew: ליפסינק)
  Each mystery singer performs a lip sync to a song; good singers mime to a recording of their own, while bad singers mime to a backing track by another vocalist.
3. Unlock my life (Hebrew: פתח את חיי)
  The guest artist is presented with a video package containing possible clues by one of the mystery singers.
4. Interrogation (Hebrew: חקירה)
  The guest artist may ask questions to the remaining mystery singers. Good singers are required to give truthful responses, while the bad singers must lie.

== Episodes ==
Legend:
Good singer
Bad singer

Episode		Guest artist (Note: Players' notes: For the returning guest artists (who also include foreigners and former good singers), names are displayed in italics.; For the mixed groups, names who identified as bad singers are displayed in italics.)	Mystery singers (In their respective numbers and aliases)					
#	Date	Guest artist	Elimination order					Winner
#	Date	Guest artist	First impression	Lip sync	Unlock my life		Interrogation	Winner
1	14 August 2023	Moshe Peretz	4. Onri Ben Simon; (Instrument Shop Owner)	3. Yuval Maatook; (Museum Guide)	2. Bar Kandero; (Machine Engineering Student)	5. Adar Kabalo; (Acting Student)	1. Noya Arava; (Banquet Hall Waitress)	6. Mori Tardio; Cleaning Company Owner
2	21 August 2023	Harel Skaat	4. Joseph Togade; (Breakdancer)	5. Hevy Hefetz; (Make-up Blogger)	1. Lotem Bar-Tov; (Hula Hoop Performer)	2. Kobi Giner; (6th Grade Teacher)	6. Guy Alon; (Techie)	3. Bruno Passi; Clinical Psychologist
3	28 August 2023	Pablo Rosenberg (Note: Season highlights: Foreign guest artist: Pablo Rosenberg (ARG; ep. 3); Good singer Hila Halevi (ep. 3) also returned on her 2nd game as a local participant, when she last performed as a foreigner for the original South Korean 3rd season.)	4. Roni Keren; (DJ)	1. Lior Ben David; (Birthday Entertainer)	6. Hila Halevi; (Korean Popstar)	2. Gal Mendel; (Pet Boarding Owner)	3. Leah Haggai; (Pastry Chef)	5. Shahaf Kahlon; Professional Dancer
4	17 September 2023	Shiri Maimon	6. Eden Golan; (Artistic Gymnast)	5. Yaeli Tal; (Sexual Therapist)	1. Gal Bankin; (Dancer)	2. Osher Saba; (Messenger)	4. Matan Oved; (Child Prodigy)	3. Nodelyah; Call Center Agent

== Reception ==
Legend:
Highest rated episode
Lowest rated episode

No.	Title	Air date	Timeslot (IST)	Rating		Live + VOSDAL		Ref(s)
No.	Title	Air date	Timeslot (IST)	Rank	Points	Share	Total	Ref(s)
1	"Moshe Peretz"	14 August 2023	Monday, 21:15	1	5.3%	13.9%	0.363	
2	"Harel Skaat"	21 August 2023	Monday, 21:15	2	5.8%	14.1%	0.396	
3	"Pablo Rosenberg"	28 August 2023	Monday, 21:15	1	6.2%	13.8%	0.424	
4	"Shiri Maimon"	17 September 2023	Sunday, 21:30	2	5.2%	12.7%	0.355	

Source: IARB
