= Ro'im et Hakol season 1 =

Television game show season

Ro'im et Hakol
- Season 1
- Starring: Ilanit Levi; Shiri Maimon; Avi Nussbaum; Ido Rosenblum
- Hosted by: Erez Tal
- Winners: Good singers: 2; Bad singers: 1
- No. of episodes: 3

Release
- Original network: Keshet 12
- Original release: 28 February – 14 March 2023

Season chronology
- Next → Season 2

The first season of the Israeli television mystery music game show Ro'im et Hakol premiered on Keshet 12 on 28 February 2023.

Originally scheduled to have seven episodes and a tentative finale on 11 April 2023, the next episode on 21 March 2023 was replaced by continuing a fifth season of Ninja Israel in its timeslot instead, prematurely ending the season.

== Gameplay ==
=== Format ===
According to the original South Korean rules, the guest artist must attempt to eliminate bad singers during its game phase. At the final performance, the last remaining mystery singer is revealed as either good or bad by means of a duet between them and one of the guest artists.

If the last remaining mystery singer is good, they are granted to release its own digital single; if a singer is bad, they win ₪20,000.

=== Rounds ===
1. First impression (Hebrew: רושם ראשוני)
  The guest artist is given some time to observe and examine each mystery singer based on their appearance.
2. Lip sync (Hebrew: ליפסינק)
  Each mystery singer performs a lip sync to a song; good singers mime to a recording of their own, while bad singers mime to a backing track by another vocalist.
3. Unlock my life (Hebrew: פתח את חיי)
  The guest artist is presented with a video package containing possible clues by one of the mystery singers.
4. Interrogation (Hebrew: חקירה)
  The guest artist may ask questions to the remaining mystery singers. Good singers are required to give truthful responses, while the bad singers must lie.

== Episodes ==
Legend:
Good singer
Bad singer

Episode		Guest artist (Note: Players' notes: For the returning guest artists (who also include foreigners and former good singers), names are displayed in italics.; For the mixed groups, names who identified as bad singers are displayed in italics.)	Mystery singers (In their respective numbers and aliases)					
#	Date	Guest artist	Elimination order					Winner
#	Date	Guest artist	First impression	Lip sync	Unlock my life		Interrogation	Winner
1	28 February 2023	Mooki	1. Ido Cohen; (Security Guard)	2. Adir Bryanovsky; (Knesset Intern)	6. May Peled; (Arts Graduate)	3. Kartali Landsmann; (Archer)	4. Chen Danino; (Paramedic)	5. Shiri Michaeli; Law Student
2	7 March 2023	Jonathan Mergui	3. Danny Budinsky; (Musicologist)	6. Eshed Kriner; (Car Engineer)	2. Yoav Peretz; (Mentalist)	5. Shira Ben-Ari; (Supermarket Cashier)	1. Noa Toledo; (Window Cleaner)	4. Oren Kaduri; Fitness Trainer
3	14 March 2023	Margalit Tzan'ani	5. Katia Loza; (Stewardess)	1. Karin Chodos; (Cosmetician)	2. Or Melech; (Farmer)	3. Nicole Adar; (Hostess)	6. Shani Dahan Yaakov; (Math Teacher)	4. Alon Yaakovi; Communications Manager

== Reception ==
Legend:
Highest rated episode
Lowest rated episode

No.	Title	Air date	Timeslot (IST)	Rating		Live + VOSDAL		Ref(s)
No.	Title	Air date	Timeslot (IST)	Rank	Points	Share	Total	Ref(s)
1	"Mooki"	28 February 2023	Tuesday, 21:15	1	7.7%	18.4%	0.528	
2	"Jonathan Mergui"	7 March 2023	Tuesday, 21:15	2	6.3%	15.5%	0.434	
3	"Margalit Tzan'ani"	14 March 2023	Tuesday, 21:15	2	5.7%	14.2%	0.389	

Source: IARB
