= Dorel (name) =

Dorel is a surname for male and female, similar to the French word doré meaning golden and can also mean Adorable

== Given name ==
- Dorel Vaginski (born 2008), Israeli female singer and songwriter
- Dorel Balint (born 1969), Romanian football defender
- Dorel Bernard (born 1974), Romanian football defender
- Dorel Cristudor (born 1954), Romanian sprinter and bobsledder
- Dorel Golan, Israeli pianist
- Dorel Iacobescu (born 1946), actor
- Dorel Moiș (born 1975), Romanian aerobic gymnast
- Dorel Mutică (born 1973), Romanian footballer and manager
- Dorel Simion (born 1977), Romanian boxer
- Dorel Stoica (born 1978), Romanian footballer
- Dorel Vișan (born 1937), Romanian actor
- Dorel Zaharia (born 1978), Romanian football striker
- Dorel Zegrean (born 1969), Romanian football defender
- Dorel Zugrăvescu (1930–2019), Romanian geophysicist

== Surname ==
- Vincent Dorel (born 1992), French football goalkeeper
