= Total Anarchy =

Studio album by Skazi
- Released: June 26, 2006
- Label: Chemical Crew
- Producer: Asher Swissa

Skazi chronology
Storm (2003)	Total Anarchy (2006)	My Way (2012)

Total Anarchy is a 2006 album released by Israeli psychedelic trance artist Asher Swissa of Skazi.

== Track listing ==
1. "Vampire"
2. "Anarchy"
3. "Hit 'N' Run"
4. "Madness"
5. "Move Away"
6. "Bang Your Mind"
7. "Outer Space"
8. "Rock & Roll"
9. "K.O."
10. "Fucking My Brain"
