= Eden Golan =

Israeli singer (born 2003)

Eden Golan עדן גולן Эден Голан
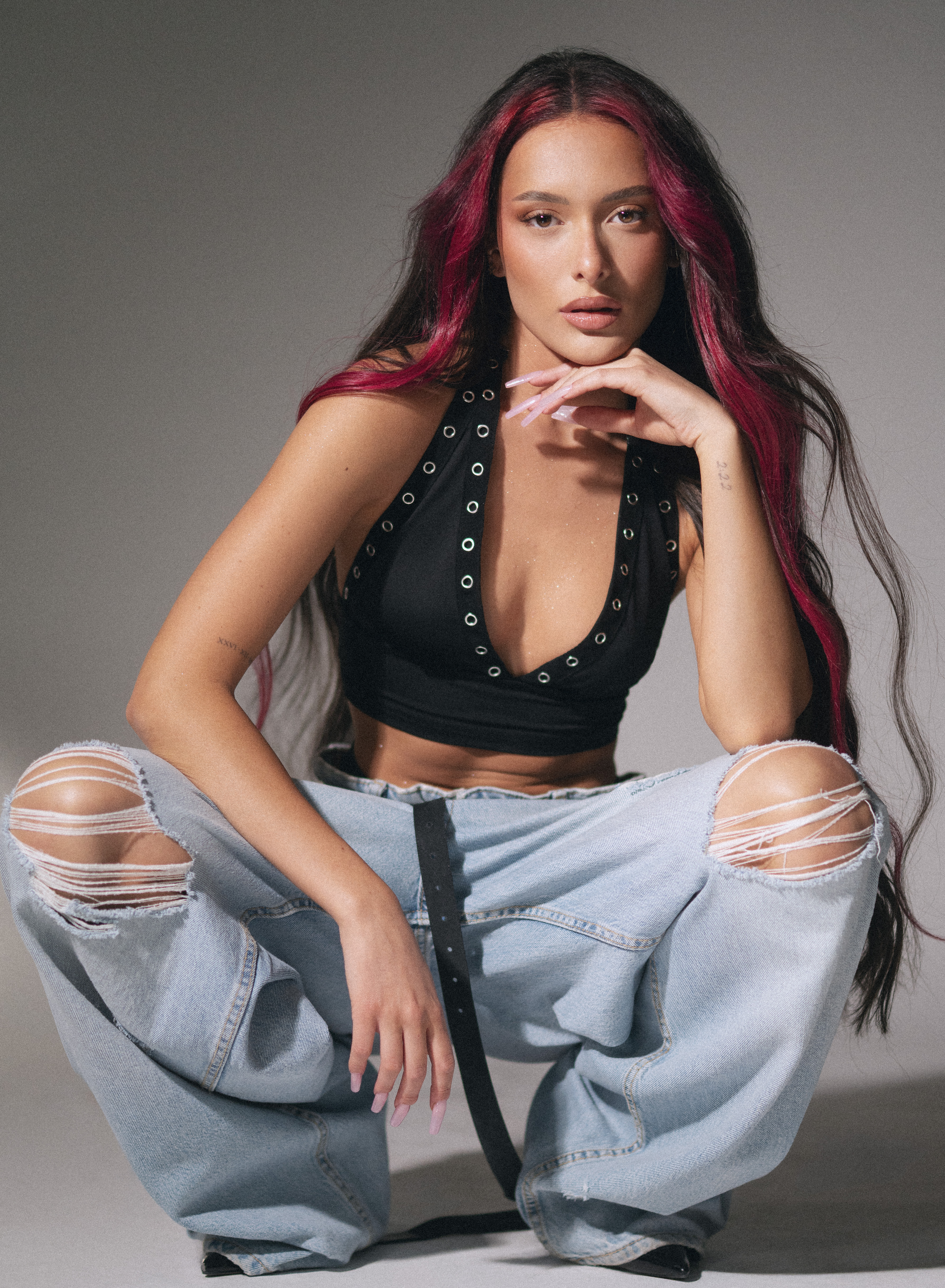
- Golan in 2025

Background information
- Born: 5 October 2003 (age 23); Kfar Saba, Israel
- Genres: Pop; dance-pop; R&B
- Occupations: Singer; songwriter; dancer; model
- Instruments: Vocals; piano
- Years active: 2015–present
- Label: Session 42

Eden Golan (Note: Hebrew: עֵדֶן גּוֹלָן, pronounced [ˈeden goˈlan]; Russian: Эден Голан, [ˈɛdʲɪn gɐˈlan]) (born 5 October 2003) is an Israeli (Note: Golan has been described as Russian-Israeli by some news outlets. However, she was born in Israel, does not consider herself Russian, and does not hold Russian citizenship.) singer, songwriter, dancer and model.

== Biography ==
Eden Golan was born in Kfar Saba, in the Central District of Israel. Both her parents were born in the Soviet Union to Jewish families of Ashkenazi descent. Golan's mother, Olga, is of Ukrainian Jewish descent, and her father, Eddie, is of Latvian Jewish descent. Her grandfather, Yuri Golan (formerly Glagolev), graduated from the Faculty of Journalism of Moscow State University and worked for the newspaper Soviet Youth. She has a younger brother, Sean Golan, and she is a niece of pianist Dorel Golan.

When Golan was six years old, she and her parents moved to Moscow due to her father's work; where they remained for 12 years. According to Golan, she has mixed feelings about her time living in Russia, and that while she started her music career there, she often felt uncomfortable due to frequent manifestations of antisemitism. Golan and her parents moved back to Israel in 2022; the immediate cause of the move was the Russian invasion of Ukraine, but according to Golan, her family would have done so regardless.

Having been exempted from serving in the Israel Defense Forces (IDF) on medical grounds, Golan decided to volunteer following her participation in Eurovision, saying "I believe serving your country is vital, especially in today's reality... I really hope to serve as a singer, performing for soldiers on bases, visiting those who protect us, and bringing them some joy—I get chills just thinking about it."

== Career ==
Golan began her singing career when she was 9 years old. In 2015, Golan took part in the Russian selection for the Junior Eurovision Song Contest 2015. She finished fifth in the final, scoring 22 points, eight fewer than the eventual winner Mikhail Smirnov. In 2016, when Golan was 12 years old, she performed in the children's edition of the New Wave competition, including performing her song "Howl at the Moon" in a duet with Nyusha. In 2018, Golan was a finalist in the fifth season of the show The Voice Kids, representing Pelageya's team. She collaborated with Yinon Yahel. She signed with label Session42 when she was 18 years old. After her return to Israel, in 2022, Golan participated in the season 2 finale of Ro'im et Hakol and was eliminated in the first round.

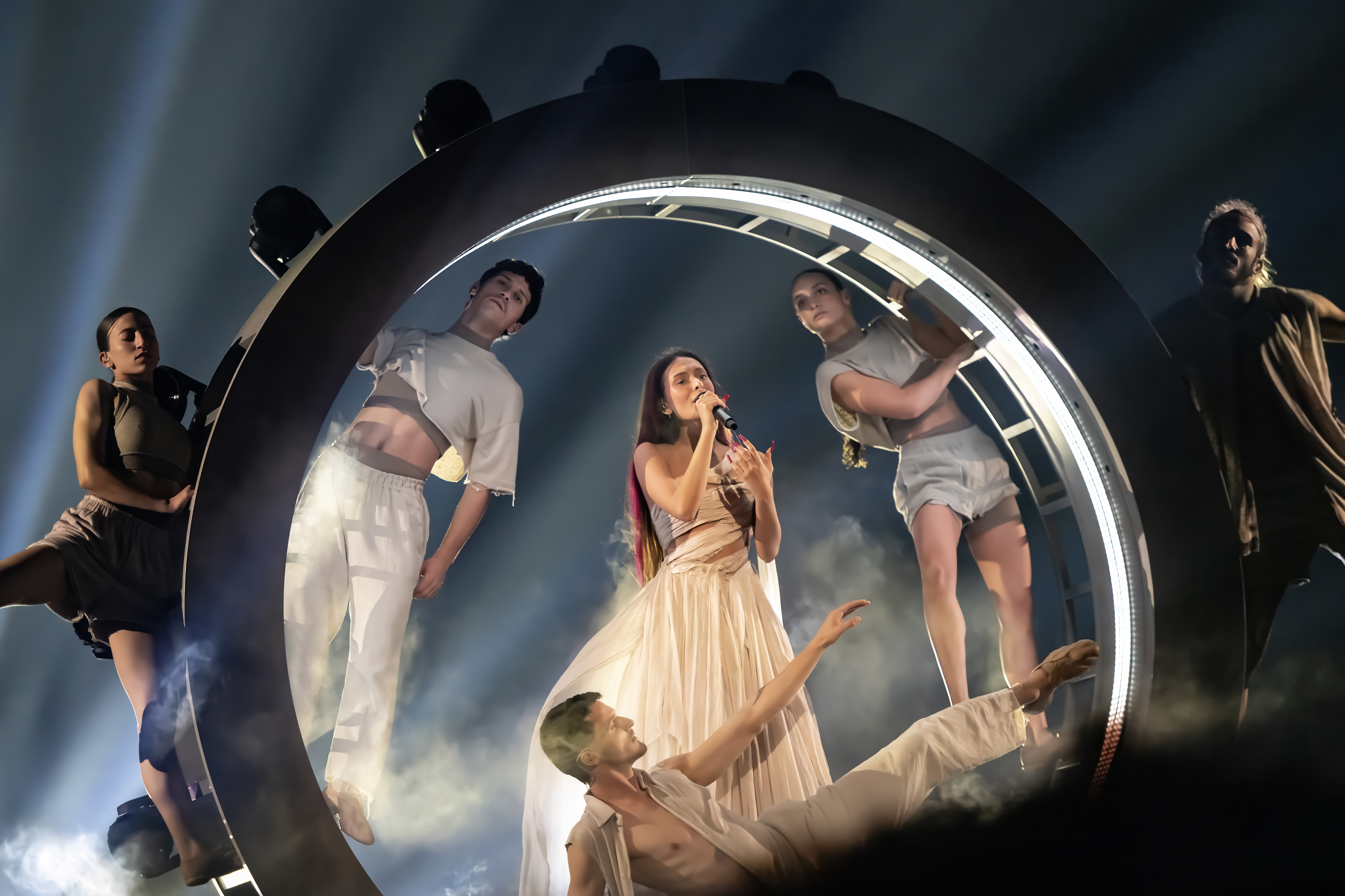
Golan at a dress rehearsal for the Eurovision Song Contest 2024

In preparation for the Eurovision Song Contest 2024, the Israeli Public Broadcasting Corporation decided to return to selecting the country's representative for the competition through cooperation with the Keshet 12 channel and the talent show Rising Star. Golan won all stages of the show, performing Whitney Houston's "I Have Nothing" and Aerosmith's "I Don't Want to Miss a Thing" for the final. She ultimately won both the jury and public vote, becoming the Israeli representative for the contest. Her entry for the contest, "Hurricane", was selected at a later stage. Her song qualified for the final on 11 May, placing first in the second semi-final, and in the grand final finished in fifth place overall with 375 points, and in second place based on the public vote.

In May 2024, she performed in a Tel Aviv rally demanding the release of hostages amid the Gaza war hostage crisis. Noga Erez, Netta Barzilai and Lola Marsh also performed. Family members of hostages also spoke, including Rachel Goldberg-Polin, mother of American-Israeli Hersh Goldberg-Polin. Ambassadors from the United States, United Kingdom, Germany and Austria also addressed the crowds. Former Secretary of State, Hillary Clinton also appeared in a video message.

On 2 June 2024, Golan joined New York City mayor Eric Adams in the annual Celebrate Israel parade, and at a fundraising event for United Hatzalah on 4 June 2024, Golan won the organization's Hero Award and Adams in his capacity as mayor declared June 4th "Eden Golan Day", saying of her performance at Eurovision “We should all use our talents, and Eden has used hers in a real way," and adding while addressing Golan “And we know you should have won the total contest.”

Golan was part of the flag team created by El Al to support the Israeli delegation to the 2024 Summer Paralympic Games in Paris, France.

Golan released her first new single, "Older", following her Eurovision performance on 25 September 2024.

Golan was the spokesperson revealing the Israeli jury votes in the final of the Eurovision Song Contest 2025.

In December 2025, Golan participated in the 2025 edition of the children's musical show Festigal alongside Shahar Tavoch.

In March 2026, speaking about her life after her performance at the 2024 Eurovision Song Contest in the context of the protests which had occurred there and at other performances of hers since, Golan said "I’ve had recurring anxiety since Eurovision: I walk into a place, a restaurant or a show, and someone shoots me from behind. I have recurring nightmares of people chasing me and killing me. But I’m learning to live with it."

On 12 June 2026, Golan performed at the 2026 Tel Aviv Pride festival, which featured its' first parade since the October 7 attacks.

In September 2026, Golan released her debut studio album Imperfections.

Golan performed as part of the memorial ceremony sponsored by the families of the victims of the October 7 attacks and hosted by Eli Sharabi and Shani Cohen on 7 October 2026.

== Discography ==
=== Studio albums ===
- Imperfections (2026)

=== Singles ===
==== As lead artist ====
Title	Year	Peak chart positions										Album
Title	Year	ISR	ISR Air.	ISR TV Air.	FRA Dig.	GRE Int.	LTU	SWE	SWI	UK Down.	UK Sales	Album
"Amazing"	2015	*	—	—	—	—	—	—	—	—	—	Non-album singles
"Ghost Town" (with Lucky Luke)	2022	*	—	—	—	—	—	—	—	—	—	Non-album singles
"Let Me Blow Ya Mind" (with Tymma)	2022	*	—	—	—	—	—	—	—	—	—	Non-album singles
"Taxi"	2023	*	—	—	—	—	—	—	—	—	—	Non-album singles
"Dopamine"	2023	*	—	—	—	—	—	—	—	—	—	Non-album singles
"Hurricane"	2024	2	1	—	5	15	24	47	29	18	18	Non-album singles
"Older"	2024	—	14	2	—	—	—	—	—	—	—	Imperfections
"Pieces" (with Offer Nissim)	2025	—	—	—	—	—	—	—	—	—	—	Non-album singles
"Wait for You"	2025	—	—	—	—	—	—	—	—	—	—	Imperfections
"You & I"	2025	—	—	—	—	—	—	—	—	—	—	Imperfections
"Sexit"	2025	—	—	2	—	—	—	—	—	—	—	Non-album singles
"Aman"	2025	98	11	3	—	—	—	—	—	—	—	Non-album singles
"Maspik Mimcha"	2026	—	—	—	—	—	—	—	—	—	—	Non-album singles
"Starbucks" (with Shrekdimc)	2026	63	1	—	—	—	—	—	—	—	—	Non-album singles
"Imperfections"	2026	—	—	—	—	—	—	—	—	—	—	Imperfections
"—" denotes a recording that did not chart or was not released in that territory. "*" denotes that the chart did not exist at that time.

==== Credited as Eden ====
Title	Year	Album
"Fake Love"	2020	Non-album singles
"No Alcohol"	2020	Non-album singles
"10 Missed Calls"	2020	Non-album singles

=== Promotional singles ===
Title	Year	Album
"Ma Hayinu Be'chayeinu" (with Elai Botner)	2024	Shav'a Shirim Beoctover
"Beautiful Horizon"	2025	House of David (soundtrack)
"Switch" (with Shahar Tavoch)	2025	Festigal 2025 (soundtrack)
"Switch" (with Shahar Tavoch)	2025	Ta'ani Dchof
"Along the Way" (with Meshi Kleinstein and Eran Mor)	2026	Moana (Hebrew soundtrack)

== Notes ==
Awards and achievements
Preceded by Eliav Zohar	HaKokhav HaBa winner 2024	Succeeded by Yuval Raphael
Preceded by Noa Kirel with "Unicorn"	Israel in the Eurovision Song Contest; 2024	Succeeded by Yuval Raphael with "New Day Will Rise"
