= Skazi =

Israeli EDM project

Skazi סקאזי
- Origin: Jerusalem, Israel
- Genres: Electronic, psytrance, dubstep, house, industrial, electronic rock
- Years active: 1998–present
- Label: Chemical Crew
- Members: Asher Swissa
- Past members: Assaf Bivas
- Website: www.skazimusic.com

Skazi (Hebrew: סקאזי) is an Israeli EDM project formed in 1998, by Asher Swissa.

== History ==
Skazi was formed in 1998 by Asher Swissa and Assaf Bivas, producing Psy-Trance Electro Punk music.

Swissa began his musical career as a punk rocker in 1990, when he formed a group called Sartan Hashad (Breast Cancer) together with three friends. The band played in small venues in Jerusalem and Tel Aviv, and enjoyed limited success in the Israeli punk scene. In 1996 Asher left the band to develop his career and to write and perform music which would appeal to larger audiences. He started making trance music, but still kept a hard rock sound, playing electric guitar riffs in many of his tracks. In 1998 he adopted the stage name DJ Skazi. Swissa is also a former member of WARRIORS, a musical group in collaboration with DJ MR.BLACK and which published one EP, Who's Afraid of 138!?, with Armada Music. In more recent years, Skazi is at times referred to with his real name, Asher Swissa, often stylised as ASHER SWISSA.

== Recording career ==
Official Skazi logo

Skazi's first album, Animal, was released in September 2000. On this album Skazi combined live guitar riffs and techy hardcore sounds. While the music meshed with other Psy-Trance, it shared elements of Hard House and Techno record label, Chemical Crew.

Skazi produced four compilations between the years 2001 and 2004 (Zoo1, Zoo2, Zoo3 and Most Wanted). Skazi has also been involved in collaborations with other artists.

== Controversy ==
During the ongoing Gaza war which started in 2023, Skazi has been vocal in his support of Israeli troops and hostages held in Gaza.

In early November 2023, Skazi participated in a video produced as "psychological warfare against Gazans and Hamas" which stated "we will return to dance on the ruins of your houses in Gaza". The video was created by "The Civil Front" ("Hachazit Haezrahit"), a self-proclaimed "apolitical" initiative calling to "completely annihilate Hamas and Islamic Jihad" and giving free rein to Israel and the IDF in Gaza.

On 28 November 2023, together with four other Israeli DJs, Skazi performed a set during a memorial at the site of the Re'im music festival massacre, where 364 concertgoers were massacred and 36 taken hostage by Hamas.

Skazi has performed for Israeli soldiers before they entered Gaza, with the intention of contributing to the war effort and raising combatants' morale and motivation to fight.

In July 2024, Skazi dedicated a set at Tomorrowland festival to Israeli troops and hostages, while displaying an Israeli flag on stage.

In July 2025, a controversy arose regarding plans for Skazi to perform again at Tomorrowland. It has been mentioned that Skazi calls himself a "Combat DJ" who motivates soldiers before they go into battle in Gaza. In response to this controversy, Skazi posted on his Instagram page stating "my mission is to bring unity" and calling to "make music not war". The performance was subsequently cancelled.

== Discography ==
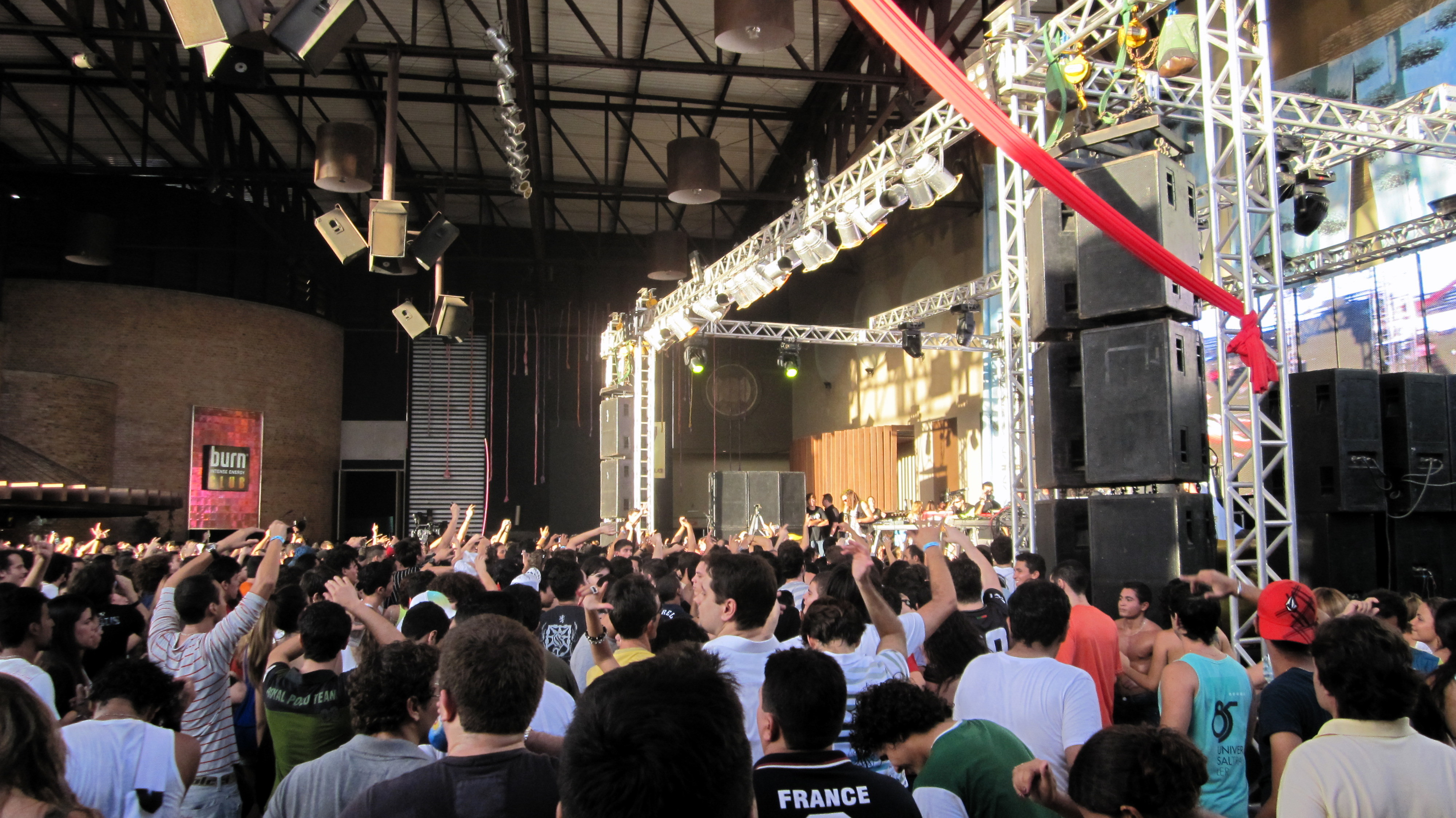
Skazi at a Rave in France

=== Albums ===
- Animal – 2000
- Zoo1 – 2001
- Storm (Shaffel Records, 2002)
- Most Wanted – 2003
- Zoo2 – 2003
- Zoo3 – 2004
- Animal In Storm – 2004
- Total Anarchy (2006)
- My Way – 2012
- Zoom in the Mix – 2014
- PsyScription – 2015
- Spin – 2015
- Faded with Nervo (2019)

=== (EPs) ===
- The Zoo EP – 2004

=== Singles ===
- "Rhythm Is a Killa" – 2025
- "Run" – 2025
- "Roof on Fire" – 2024
- "Boom" – 2024
- "Alive (Darkland Remix)" – 2024
- "For You (When You're Sad)" – 2024
- "Tumaundu" – 2024
- "Mental Voice" – 2024
- "Closer Enemy" – 2023
- "I Wish (Skazi Edit)" – 2023
- "Im Nin'Alu (Skazi Remix)" – 2023
- "Tandava / Durga" – 2023
- "Na Le (Asher Swissa Remix)" – 2023
- "Tomorrow" – 2023
- "Stay" – 2023
- "Carmen" – 2022
- "I Am Back" – 2022
- "Deva Mahadeva" – 2022
- "Buzzing" – 2022
- "World Ends" – 2022
- "Macarena Baladeira" – 2021
- "Breathless" – 2021
- "Warrior (Gottinari Remix)" – 2021
- "The Drum (Aura Vortex Remix)" – 2021
- "Hit N' Run (Skazi & TOXIC Remix)" – 2021
- "Jump! Remixes" – 2021
- "Break You" – 2021
- "Stadium" – 2021
- "Kataleya" – 2021
- "Haunted House" – 2020
- "Way Down" – 2020
- "Imensidão" – 2020
- "Heart on the Tree" – 2020
- "Caliente" – 2020
- "Ayy Muchacho" – 2020
- "Faded (HVRCRFT Remix)" – 2020
- "Faded (HVRCRFT Extended Remix)" – 2020
- "I Love Haters" – 2020
- "Carnival" – 2020
- "Artillery (PSY Mix)" – 2019
- "Faded" – 2019
- "Artillery" – 2019
- "Do It" – 2019
- "Aman" – 2019
- "Story" – 2019
- "Karate" – 2019
- "Party Don’t Stop" – 2019
- "Breeze" – 2018
- "Falafel (Moto Perpetuo & Blazy Remix)" – 2018
- "Tappez Les Mains" – 2018
- "Opa" – 2018
- "The Seventies Track" – 2018
- "He Hi" – 2018
- "India" – 2017
- "Jump!" – 2017
- "Acelera (Blastoyz Remix)" – 2017
- "Drop The Pill" – 2015
- "Psycription" – 2015
- "Poison" – 2014
