= Adam Baruch =

Israeli journalist (1945–2008)

- אדם ברוך
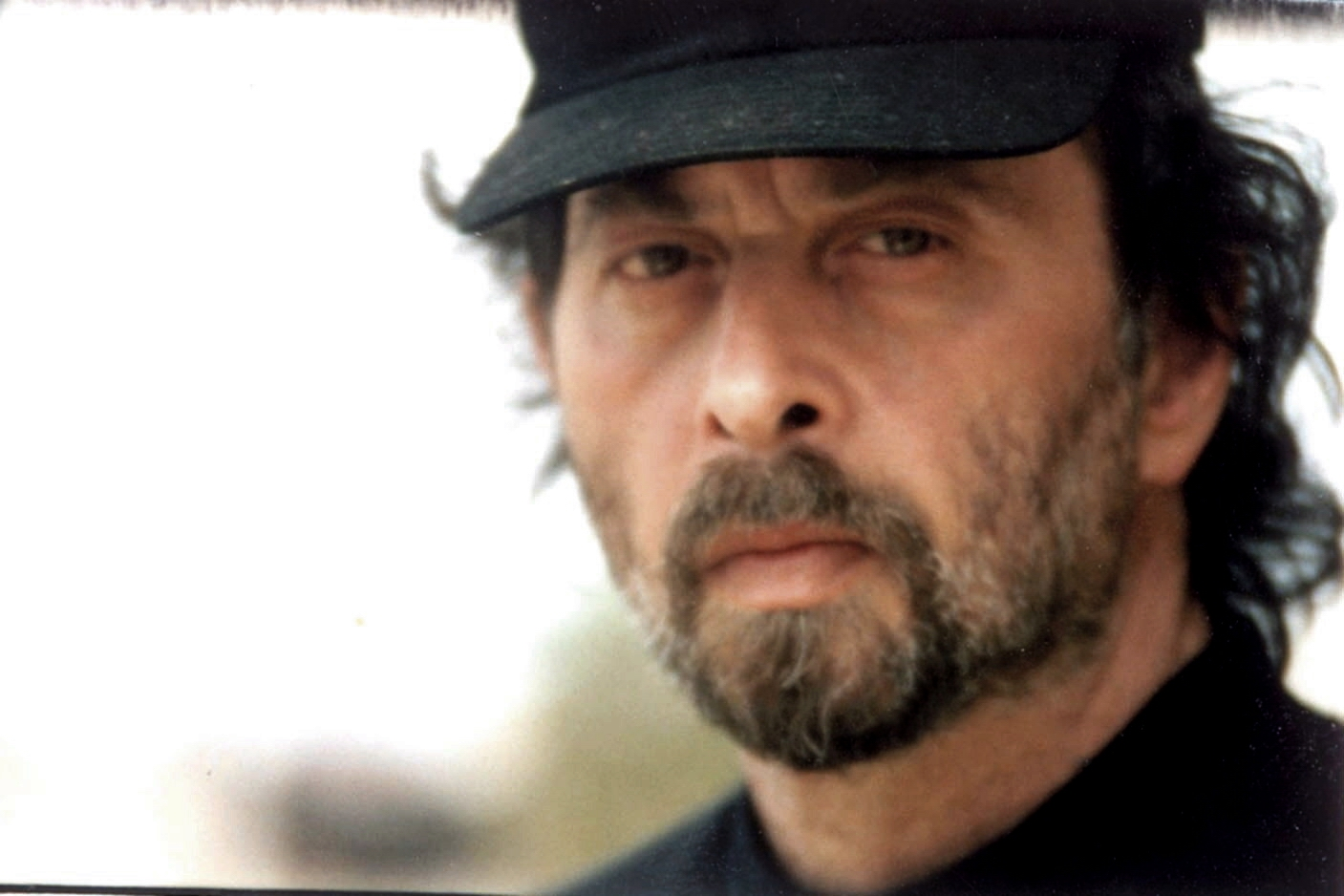
- Baruch in 1999
- Born: Baruch Meir Rosenblum; 9 April 1945; Jerusalem, Mandatory Palestine
- Died: 24 May 2008 (aged 63); Jaffa, Israel
- Occupations: Journalist; writer; newspaper editor; art critic
- Years active: 1974–2008
- Children: 3

Adam Baruch (Hebrew: אדם ברוך; 9 April 1945 – 24 May 2008) was an Israeli journalist, newspaper editor, writer and art critic.

== Biography ==
Baruch Meir Rosenblum (later Adam Baruch) was born in the Meah Shearim neighborhood of Jerusalem, Israel. His father, Asher Rosenblum, was a lawyer, art dealer and active politically in Hapoel HaMizrachi. His maternal grandfather was Rabbi Yitzchak Yaakov Wachtfogel, head of the Mea Shearim Yeshiva and Av Beit Din for the Ashkenazi communities.

He was raised in Ramat Gan, completed his high school education at the Noam Yeshiva High School in Pardes Hannah and later for a short time in Hebron Yeshiva, and studied law at the Hebrew University of Jerusalem.

His first wife was the photographer Ariella Shvide, with whom he had two children: Ido Rosenblum, a screenwriter and TV personality, and Amalia Rosenblum, a writer. He lived in Jaffa with his partner, Shira Aviad, mother of his second son, Itay Asher.

He died from diabetes in 2008.

== Journalism ==
Adam Baruch edited the journals "Musag" (1974–1976), "Monitin" (1978–1982) and "Shishi Tarbut" (1995–1996); and the daily newspaper "Globes" (1992–1996). During the 1980s he was the editor of the weekend supplement "Seven Days" of the daily newspaper Yedioth Ahronoth, and was the editor of Maariv for a short period of time in 1992, when the newspaper was owned by Robert Maxwell. During his last years he wrote a weekly column called "Shishi" (sixth, or Friday, in Hebrew), in the Maariv weekend supplement "Mussaf HaShabbat". Previous personal columns of his were "Eye Contact" – a weekly art page in Yedioth Ahronoth, and a column in the weekly newspaper "Koteret Rashit".

Baruch also created the television interview series "Adam Baruch in Search of an Answer" ("אדם ברוך מחפש תשובה"), broadcast on the Israel Broadcasting Authority's Channel one, and the short movie "Eye Witness" ("עד ראייה"), broadcast on the Israeli Channel two.

== Published works ==
- Ma Nisma BaBayit (Hebrew for How are Things at Home?), Dvir, 2004 – short essays on impressions of the last 25 years in Israel.
- Hayeinu (Our Life), Jerusalem, Keter Publishing House, 2002 – an attempt to define regulations for Jewish life in modern Israel.
- Betom Lev (In Good Faith), Jerusalem, Keter Publishing House, 2001 – interpretation and commentary on Jewish culture.
- Seider Yom (Daily Routine), subtitled "Daily Life in the Mirror of the Halakha", Jerusalem, Keter Publishing House, 2000 – Halakhic implementation and interpretation on modern daily life issues, such as money, family, language, stock market, and many others.
- After Rabin: New Art from Israel, by Susan Tumarkin Goodman, Yaron Ezrahi, Adam Baruch, Tali Tamir, Jewish Museum Staff; New York, N.Y, Jewish Museum, 1999 – essays in a catalog accompanying a Jewish Museum of New York exhibition by the same name, discussing the effect of the assassination of Prime Minister Yitzhak Rabin on art in Israel.
- Hu Haya Gibor (He was a Hero), Hakibbutz Hameuchad, 1998 – 41 short stories originally published in Baruch's "Eye Contact" column Yedioth Ahronoth, about situations in contemporary Jewish and Israeli life.
- Pisul Hiloni (Secular Sculpturing), 1988 – about the Sculptor Yechiel Shemi.
- Lustig, 1985 – an autobiographical story.
