= Neviot =

Marketing company

- Native name: נביעות
- Industry: Spring water
- Founded: 1989; 37 years ago
- Website: www.neviot.co.il

Neviot (Hebrew: נביעות) is an Israeli mineral water marketing company.

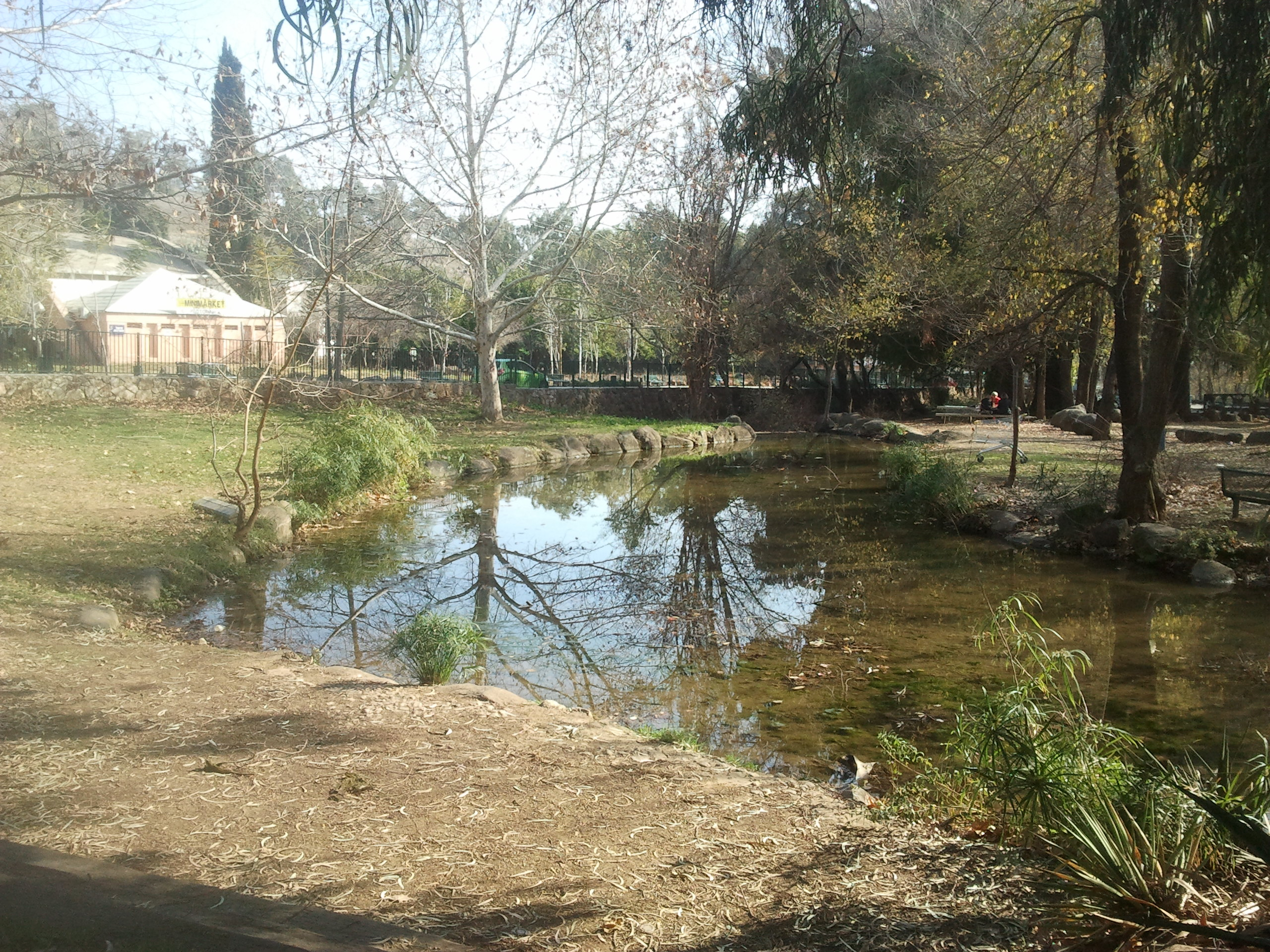
Ein Zahav spring

== History ==
Neviot was established in 1989 after geologists discovered that the water of Ein Zahav spring near Kiryat Shmona was suitable for drinking. In 2002, Neviot changed its logo and bottle design.

In 2004, the Podhorzer family, which owned Neviot, sold almost half its shares to the Central Bottling Company (Coca-Cola Israel), which already owned 34.06% of Neviot, bringing its total stake to 78.58%.

== See also ==
- Economy of Israel
