= Dorel Golan =

Israeli pianist

Dorel Golan (Hebrew: דוראל גולן) is an Israeli pianist.

Golan completed her Masters studies with Prof. Arie Vardi at the Buchmann-Mehta Academy of Music in Tel Aviv. Since 1992, she has been a recipient of the American-Israel Culture Foundation scholarship. Golan has performed with some of the most important orchestras in the world, as well as with all the major orchestras in Israel including the Israeli Philharmonic Orchestra.

She appeared successfully in recitals at the Salle Cortot in Paris, at the Tivoli Hall in Copenhagen, at the Concertgebouw in Amsterdam, where she recorded her first CD. She also played in many other important centers.

Dorel played in various festivals, including the Klavier-Festival Ruhr in Germany. In 2006 she performed in the Israel Festival in Jerusalem.

Her niece is Eden Golan, who represented Israel in the Eurovision Song Contest 2024.

== Awards and prizes ==
- Israel America Culture Foundation award, since 1992
- First Prize – Marsala International Piano Competition in Italy, 1992
- First Best Young Pianist Prize Bremen International Piano Competition, 2001
- First Prize – Claremont Competition, 1996
- First Prize - Ariana Katz Competition, 1999
- First Prize - Ariana Katz Competition, 2006
- First Prize - Rubin Academy Competition, 2004
- First Prize - Rubin Academy Competition, 2006
