= Ido Rosenblum =

Israeli screenwriter and host

- עידו רוזנבלום
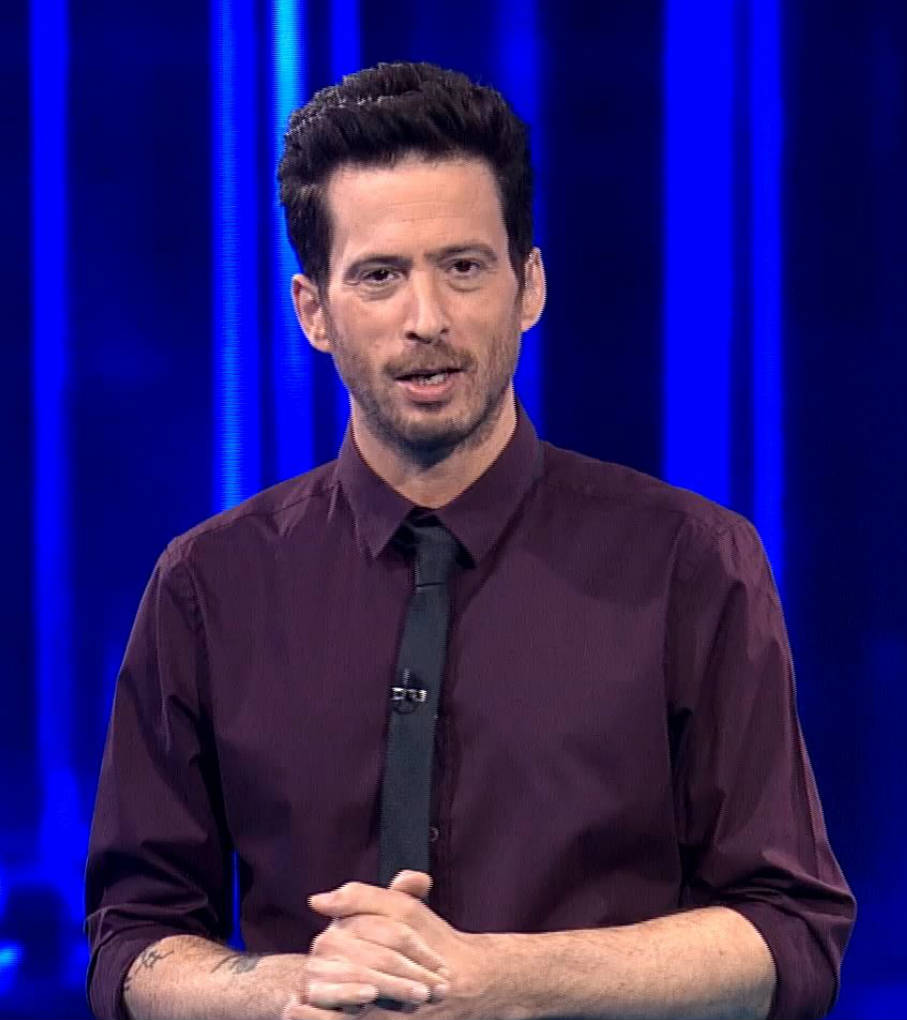
- Rosenblum in 2018
- Born: 16 November 1976 (age 49); Jaffa, Israel
- Years active: 1997–present
- Height: 191 cm (6 ft 3 in)
- Spouse: Yonit Levi (m. 2011)
- Children: 3

Ido Rosenblum (Hebrew: עידו רוזנבלום; born 16 November 1976) is an Israeli screenwriter, actor, television presenter, comedian, columnist, TV and film producer and TV and Film director. In 2008 he founded 4dolfins Productions, named after the house on HaDolphin St. 4 in Jaffa, where he grew up.

== Biography ==
Rosenblum was born and raised in Jaffa, and was educated in Tel Aviv and New York City. Rosenblum's first home was across the street from the Abu Hassan hummus restaurant in Jaffa. His father was the journalist and author Adam Baruch (Originally: Baruch Meir Rosenblum). His mother was the photographer Ariella Shvide. His sister is the journalist and author Amalia Rosenblum. His brother-in-law (Amalia's husband) is the singer and musician Yuval Banai (lead singer of the band Mashina).

In his youth Rosenblum played basketball for the Hapoel Tel Aviv youth teams. As a result of an offer by Shimi Rieger and Eric Henig, he moved to the United States, where he studied and played basketball during high school, with a dream to be an NBA player. He went on to return to Israel and retire from basketball.

== Career ==
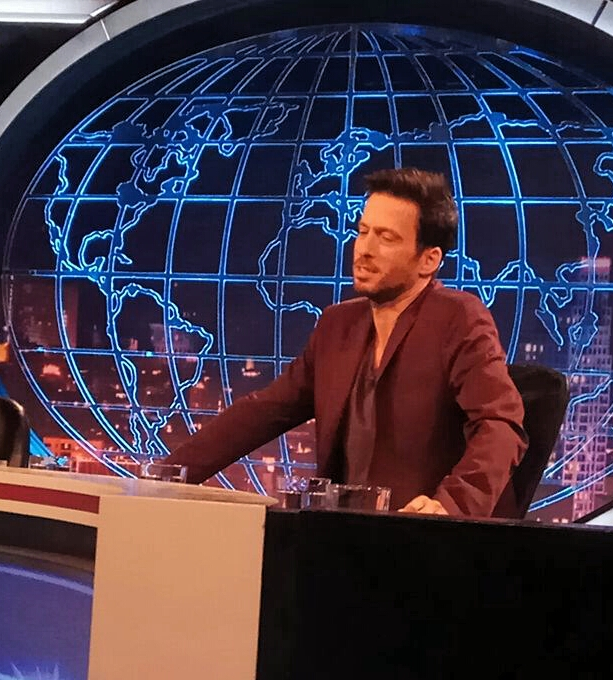
Rosenblum on the set of the program Gav Ha'Uma, June 2017

Between 1997 and 1998 he presented a segment in the program Sheva Bul hosted by Yael Bar Zohar on the Kids Channel. In 2005 and 2006, he co-hosted the reality show 48 Hours on Channel 2's Keshet broadcasts alongside his then-partner, Dorit Bar Or. This was his first television appearance as a host. In 2007, the full-length fictional film The Debt, which he co-wrote alongside Assaf Bernstein, was released in theaters. In 2011, an American version of the film was produced, starring Helen Mirren, and it achieved box office success.

Rosenblum directed music videos for the band Monica Sex, the singer Sharon Rotter and additionally the election campaign of Shinui in the 2006 election. He was also a writer on Eli Yatzpan's show.

From 2007 Rosenblum hosts the Israeli version of the game show Cash Cab, broadcast on Channel 2, and the game show Disturbed on Bip owned by Hot. He also directs and writes sketches for the satire show Eretz Nehederet (Amazing Land). On the third season of the program Night Club Rosenblum was a panel member, alongside Erez Tal and other comedians. In 2011 Rosenblum started hosting the Israeli version of Minute to Win It.

Between 2009 and 2011 Rosenblum published the column "My Childhood and I" on the weekend supplement of Israel Hayom, where he wrote about a variety of topics. After a change in the supplement's editor and a request to refrain from writing his political views in his column, Rosenblum decided to stop writing it.

In 2012 he hosted alongside Yael Poliakov the matchmaking show Singles on Hot Comedy Central. In the same year, Rosenblum hosted the program What a Day broadcast by Keshet on Channel 2, alongside Avi Nusbaum and Shai Goldstein.

In 2014 he created the format for the gameshow Boom! which he hosted himself. The format was sold to many countries around the world, including Fox and the French channel TF1.

In 2015 Rosenblum created and wrote the series HaHadash Shel Omri Gordon (Omri Gordon's New) for Channel 2's Keshet broadcasts, and even starred in it. He was also a panel member on the show Gav Ha'Uma (Back of the Nation). In 2016, he created the format and game show Touch, which was broadcast on Keshet. The format involved viewers at home in a live game, where they were asked to identify "what’s wrong with the picture" using a mobile app. The format was sold by Keshet to the leading Colombian TV channel Caracol and was broadcast daily during prime time. In May 2017, Rosenblum began hosting award-winning game show HaMirdaf, the Israeli version of The Chase on Kan 11, the channel of the Israeli Public Broadcasting Corporation. In November of the same year, Hatuna MiMabat Rishon, the Israeli version of Married at First Sight, premiered on Keshet's new Channel 12, with Rosenblum hosting its first seasons.

In May 2018 the film Sochnei HaZikaron (Memory Agents), which he produced and directed with his sister Amalia about their father, Adam Baruch, premiered on HOT8.

In July 2020 he began hosting the fourth season of Beit Sefer LeMuzica (Music School), which was broadcast on Channel 12. Two months later, he started hosting the show HaZamar BeMasecha (The Masked Singer) on Channel 12. In early November 2020, about a month after he began hosting the fifth season of HaMirdaf (The Chase), while it was still airing, Guy Pines revealed on his show Erev Tov with Guy Pines that Rosenblum would not be hosting the show from its sixth season onward. This decision followed a policy by the broadcasting corporation to stop employing talents closely associated with competing TV channels, considering that Rosenblum had hosted a number of prominent programs on Channel 12. Rosenblum was replaced by Lucy Ayoub, but later returned to host the show's seventh season.

In 2021 Rosenblum became the brand ambassador for Neviot.

In December 2021 Rosenblum temporarily replaced Eyal Kitzis as the host of Eretz Nehederet as Kitzis caught COVID-19.

In 2022 Rosenblum hosted the reality show Hakvutza (The Group) on Channel 12.

In 2023 Rosenblum became a panel member on Ro'im et Hakol on Channel 12.

== Personal life ==
In October 2011 Rosenblum married journalist and news anchor Yonit Levi in their Tel Aviv apartment. Their son was born in November 2013, followed by a daughter in December 2015, and a second daughter in May 2018. The family resides in Tel Aviv. His sister, Amalia Rosenblum, is a journalist and author. He is also friends with American director Quentin Tarantino.
