= Asher Swissa =

Israeli musical artist

Asher Swissa אשר סוויסה
- Born: Asher Swissa; 1975 (age 50–51); Jerusalem, Israel
- Genres: Psychedelic trance Punk, electronic rock, industrial house
- Occupation: Musician
- Instruments: Guitar, keyboards, vocals, programming
- Years active: 1990–present
- Label: Chemical Crew
- Website: www.skazilive.com

Asher Swissa (Hebrew: אשר סוויסה) is a member of the band Skazi. Based in Israel, Asher Swissa has been producing psytrance since 1998. Their first CD "Animal" was released in September 2000. He is the owner of the Chemical Crew label, and has worked with many artists, including Infected Mushroom, Astrix, GMS, Talamasca, Eskimo, Void, Exaile, Psychotic Micro.

== Biography ==
Born in Israel to Moroccan Jewish parents in 1975. Asher started his musical career as a Punk-Rocker in 1990, when he formed a group called Sartan Hashad (literally Breast Cancer) together with 3 friends. The band used to play in small venues in Jerusalem and Tel Aviv, and enjoyed limited success in the small Israeli Punk scene. In 1996 Asher decided to leave the band, as he wished to develop his career, write and perform music which would appeal to a larger audience. He started making Trance music, but still kept a hard rock sound, playing electric guitar riffs in many of his tracks. In 1998 he adopted the stage name DJ Skazi. In 2012, he took part in an Israeli documentary show called "Mehubarim" ("Connected"), in which he used a handheld camera to record his intimate everyday life.

In July 2020, he published a video on social media announcing he contracted COVID-19.

== Controversy ==
During the ongoing Gaza war which started in 2023, Swissa has been vocal in his support of Israeli troops and hostages held in Gaza.

In early November 2023, he participated (as Skazi) in a video produced as "psychological warfare against Gazans and Hamas" which stated "we will return to dance on the ruins of your houses in Gaza". The video was created by "The Civil Front" ("Hachazit Haezrahit"), a self-proclaimed "apolitical" initiative calling to "completely annihilate Hamas and Islamic Jihad" and giving free rein to Israel and the IDF in Gaza.

On 28 November 2023, together with four other Israeli DJs, Swissa performed a set (as Skazi) during a memorial at the site of the Re'im music festival massacre, where 364 concertgoers were killed and 36 taken hostage by Hamas.

Swissa has performed (as Skazi) for Israeli soldiers before they entered Gaza, with the intention of contributing to the war effort and raising combatants' morale and motivation to fight.

In July 2024, Swissa dedicated a Skazi set at Tomorrowland festival to Israeli troops and hostages, while displaying an Israeli flag on stage.

In July 2025, a controversy arose regarding plans for Skazi to perform again at Tomorrowland. It has been mentioned that Swissa calls himself a "Combat DJ" who motivates soldiers before they go into battle in Gaza. In response to this controversy, Swissa posted on his Instagram page stating "my mission is to bring unity" and calling to "make music not war". The performance has subsequently been cancelled.

== Discography ==
- Animal (Shaffel Records, 2001)
- Media:Zoo1 (released October 2001)
- Storm (Shaffel Records, 2002)
- Media:Zoo2 (released January 2003)
- Media:Zoo3 2CD (released January 2003)
- Media:Animal in Storm (Special Edition, Double CD)
- Media:Most wanted – Compiled By Skazi (released January 2003)
- Total Anarchy (released June 29, 2006)
- Zoo Vol. 4: To The Floor (released 2009)
- My way (Released 2012)
