= Ro'im et Hakol =

Israeli television game show

- Hebrew: רואים את הקול
- Literally: I see a voice
- Genre: Game show
- Based on: I Can See Your Voice by CJ ENM
- Written by: Chai Nahum
- Directed by: Alon Aloush
- Creative director: Claude Dediah
- Presented by: Erez Tal
- Starring: Ilanit Levi; Shiri Maimon; Avi Nussbaum; Ido Rosenblum
- Country of origin: Israel
- Original language: Hebrew
- No. of seasons: 2
- No. of episodes: 7

Production
- Producers: Ziv Bezalel; Assaf Gil; Gilad Malkin
- Camera setup: Multi-camera
- Production company: Gil Productions

Original release
- Network: Keshet 12
- Release: 28 February – 17 September 2023

Related
- I Can See Your Voice franchise

Ro'im et Hakol (Hebrew: רואים את הקול) is an Israeli television mystery music game show based on the South Korean programme I Can See Your Voice, featuring its format where a guest artist attempts to eliminate bad singers from the group, until the last mystery singer remains for a duet performance. It first aired on Keshet 12 on 28 February 2023.

== Gameplay ==
=== Format ===
Over the course of four rounds, the guest artist must attempt to eliminate bad singers from a group of six "mystery singers", identified only by their occupation or alias, without ever hearing them perform live. They are assisted by clues regarding the singers' backgrounds, style of performance, and observations from a celebrity panel. At the end of a game, the last remaining mystery singer is revealed as either good or bad by means of a duet between them and one of the guest artists.

If the last remaining mystery singer is good, they are granted to release its own digital single; if a singer is bad, they win ₪20,000.

=== Rounds ===
==== Visual round ====
- First impression (Hebrew: רושם ראשוני)

s1–2: The guest artist is given some time to observe and examine each mystery singer based on their appearance.

==== Lip sync round ====
- Lip sync (Hebrew: ליפסינק)

s1–2: Each mystery singer performs a lip sync to a song; good singers mime to a recording of their own, while bad singers mime to a backing track by another vocalist.

==== Evidence round ====
- Unlock my life (Hebrew: פתח את חיי)

s1–2: The guest artist is presented with a video package containing possible clues by one of the mystery singers.

==== Interrogation round ====
- Interrogation (Hebrew: חקירה)

s1–2: The guest artist may ask questions to the remaining mystery singers. Good singers are required to give truthful responses, while the bad singers must lie.

== Production ==
Following the success of HaZamar b'Masekha, Keshet Media Group formally acquired the rights to produce an Israeli adaptation of I Can See Your Voice in July 2022, with Gil Productions assigning on production duties.

== Broadcast history ==
Ro'im et Hakol debuted on 28 February 2023. However, the next episode originally scheduled to continue on 21 March 2023, was replaced by continuing a fifth season of Ninja Israel in its timeslot instead, prematurely ending the first season; these remaining three episodes from the previous would begin airing a separate second season on 14 August 2023, with a leftover episode that concluded on 17 September 2023.

== Series overview ==
Series	Episodes	Originally released		Good singers	Bad singers
Series	Episodes	First released	Last released	Good singers	Bad singers
1	3	28 February 2023	14 March 2023	2	1
2	4	14 August 2023	17 September 2023	2	2

== Episodes ==
=== Season 1 (2023) ===
List of season 1 episodes
No. overall	No. in season	Guest artist(s)	Player order (Note: It refers to the guest artist(s) that have played in according to their first game; returning guest artists (which also include foreigners or former good singers, with their names displaying in italics) are not counted.)	Original release date	ISR viewers (millions)	ISR rating/share (national)
1	1	Mooki	1	28 February 2023	0.528	7.7%/18.4%
2	2	Jonathan Mergui	2	7 March 2023	0.434	6.3%/15.5%
3	3	Margalit Tzan'ani	3	14 March 2023	0.389	5.7%/14.2%

=== Season 2 (2023) ===
List of season 2 episodes
No. overall	No. in season	Guest artist(s)	Player order	Original release date	ISR viewers (millions)	ISR rating/share (national)
4	1	Moshe Peretz	4	14 August 2023	0.363	5.3%/13.9%
5	2	Harel Skaat	5	21 August 2023	0.396	5.8%/14.1%
6	3	Pablo Rosenberg (Note: Foreign guest artist: Argentina — Pablo Rosenberg)	6	28 August 2023	0.424	6.2%/13.8%
7	4	Shiri Maimon	7	17 September 2023	0.355	5.2%/12.7%
