= New Day Will Rise =

2025 single by Yuval Raphael

Single by Yuval Raphael
- Released: 9 March 2025
- Length: 2:59
- Label: Tedy Productions
- Songwriter: Keren Peles
- Producer: Tomer Biran

Yuval Raphael singles chronology
"New Day Will Rise" (2025)	"Amber Skies" (2025)

Audio sample
- file; help

Music video
- "New Day Will Rise" on YouTube

Eurovision Song Contest 2025 entry
- Country: Israel
- Artist: Yuval Raphael
- Languages: English; French; Hebrew
- Composer: Keren Peles
- Lyricist: Keren Peles

Finals performance
- Semi-final result: 1st
- Semi-final points: 203
- Final result: 2nd
- Final points: 357

Entry chronology
- ◄ "Hurricane" (2024)
- "Michelle" (2026) ►

Official performance video
- "New Day Will Rise" (Second Semi-Final) on YouTube "New Day Will Rise" (Grand Final) on YouTube

"New Day Will Rise" (Hebrew: יום חדש יעלה, yum hadsh yaala) is the debut single by Israeli singer Yuval Raphael. It was written by Keren Peles and produced by Tomer Biran. It was released on 9 March 2025 through Tedy Productions. The song represented Israel in the Eurovision Song Contest 2025, where it finished second with 357 points.

The song is described by Israeli media outlets alongside Peles as a song that advocates growth and hope through hard times for Israelis. The song received mixed reception from both Israeli and international media, drawing some praise for Raphael's vocals and the song's musical composition. However, it also received heavy criticism for its perceived generic nature and the inclusion of French within the song; the latter criticism came primarily from Israeli media. "New Day Will Rise" enjoyed commercial success in its native country, peaking at number one.

== Composition and release ==
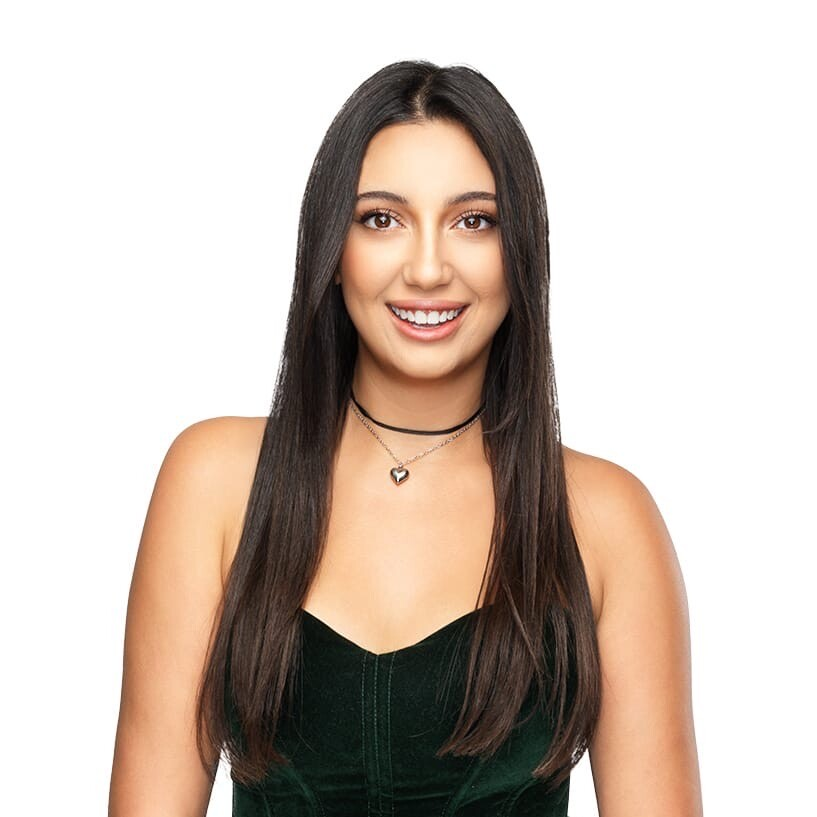
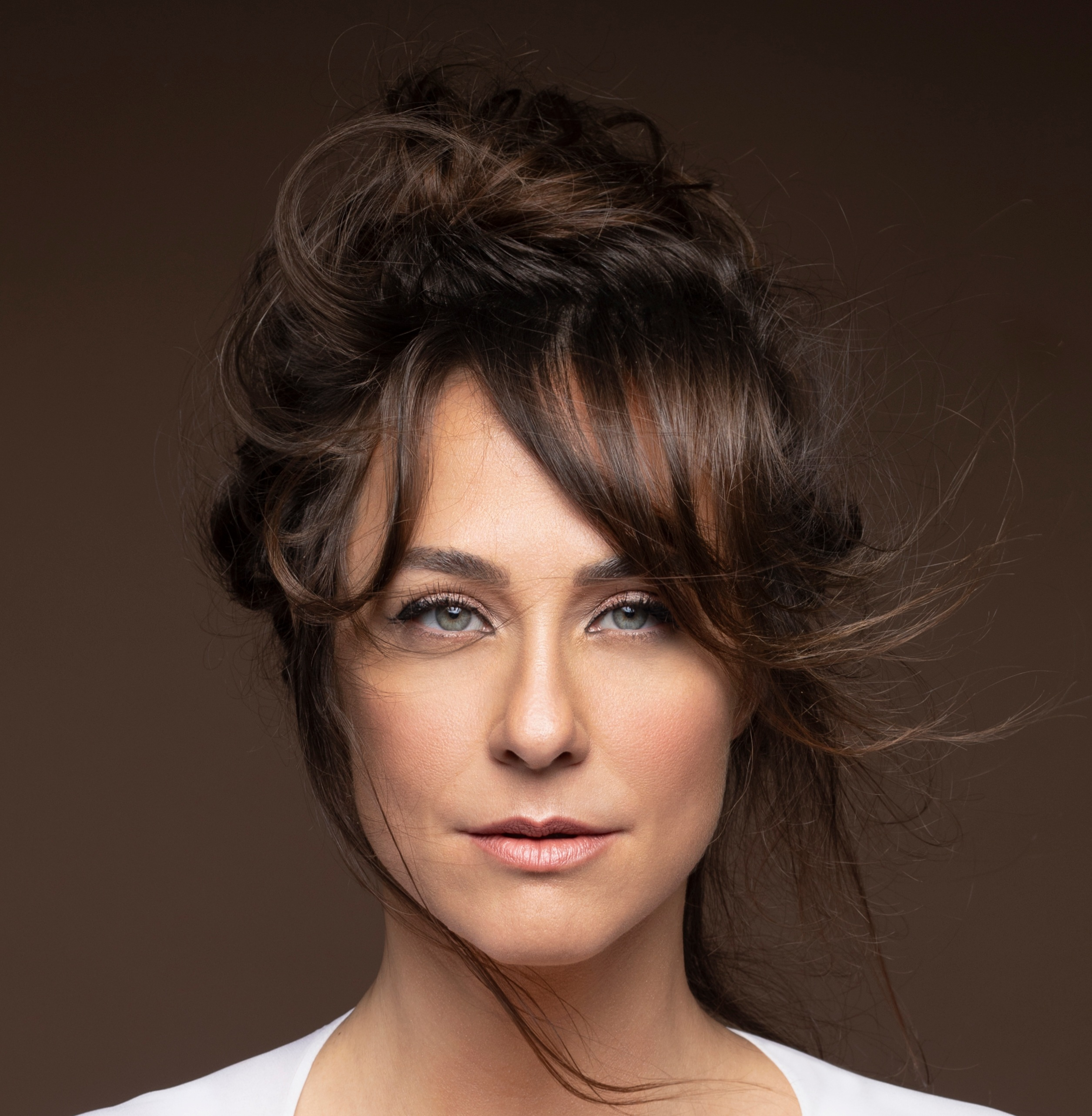
"New Day Will Rise" was sung by Yuval Raphael (left) and written by Keren Peles (right).

"New Day Will Rise" was written by Keren Peles and produced by Tomer Biran.

The song features verses in three languages: English, French, and Hebrew, with the song being described by Israel Hayom's Nathan Stollero as an encouragement to "look forward, towards the future, with the intention of developing and growing". Another analysis by writer Guy Solo from Israeli Eurovision fansite EuroMix stated that the song featured the themes of "love and hope", adding that the song's lyrics "speak of coping with loss, separation and pain, but also of the possibility of overcoming and renewal". In interviews, Peles stated the song was meant to represent a "new sunrise" that Israelis wish for after the Gaza war. Peles later added in Ynet in response to calls for Israel's exclusion from Eurovision that she wanted the song to "place the beautiful, beating Israeli heart at the center... The more they try to bring her down, the stronger she rises."

The song premiered on 9 March 2025 during a special broadcast on Kan 11. A Hebrew Bible verse from Song of Songs 8:7a is featured within the song; when it was originally released, the original version featured a mispronunciation of the verse. As a result, a rerecorded version with the proper pronunciation was released three days later.

== Music video and promotion ==
Along with the song's release, an accompanying music video directed by Ofir Peretz was released on the same day. The video was filmed throughout the days of 25–26 February. According to Peretz, the video features Raphael and a group of her friends "heading out into nature", with Raphael "gradually" telling her group's story by singing. In an analysis by The Jerusalem Post's Hannah Brown, the group of people participating in recreational activities within the video demonstrates how the survivors of the Nova festival massacre recover. The video also features the usage of red anemones, Israel's national flower. Another alternate video created by AI artists Boaz Tamir and Uri Galiri was released on 9 April, which was described by the duo was a "direct continuation of the 'Hurricane' music video".

=== Promotion ===
To promote the song before the contest, Raphael accepted an invitation to meet Israeli president Isaac Herzog for a publicity appearance on 5 May 2025. Raphael did not attend any Eurovision pre-parties; however, she did schedule an appearance at a fan event organised by OGAE Israel to promote the song on 28 March. In addition, the Israel Government Advertising Agency allegedly paid for advertisements to air on Google devices before and during the contest, with the advertisements being produced in multiple languages and being aired in 35 countries, according to an investigation from Spotlight, an independent news outlet operated by the European Broadcasting Union (EBU), the sanctioning body for Eurovision. The advertisements featured Raphael detailing to prospective voters how to vote for Israel, depending on which country it was targeted to.

== Critical reception ==
=== Israeli media and personalities ===
Amongst Israeli media, the reception was mixed. Maariv's Dor Segal Albuquerque wrote a positive review, stating that the song was "one of the most beautiful songs this year" and a healing song that was "exactly what we needed after this difficult year". Haaretz's Ben Shalev gave a mixed review. He praised some parts of "New Day Will Rise", giving positive remarks to the song's Hebrew parts and final refrain. However, he criticised the song for sounding too similar and generic, writing that it had "too many iconic influences on its shoulders and fails to present an independent musical identity of a beautiful, memorable tune". Channel 12's Neta Hotar compared the song to a "Maya Bouskilla cover of Celine Dion", describing it as "hollow" and stating that "you can imagine the AI prompt that had to be written to come up with such a chorus, and also the 'add some French, throw in a verse from the Bible and a lot of synonyms for the light' corrections." Haaretz's Anat Kamm, in addition to calling the song "mediocre", heavily criticised the appearance of Israel in the contest, describing their participation as an "illusion" and distraction from the country's military operations in the Gaza Strip, stating that "Israel, for its part, did not learn the lesson" of the country's reception at Eurovision 2024.

Time Out Israel's Avishai Sela wrote that the song "erased almost every sign of Hebrew music" in hopes of doing well at Eurovision. Despite this, he stated that he had "a big doubt" that the song could win the contest. Ynet reporter Einav Schiff heavily criticised the song for its similarity to French chansons, stating that "Raphael's voice is worthy of little more than a song at the level of a young talent night in an unpopular brasserie". He also criticised the addition of French within the song. Despite his criticism, he wrote that, regardless, the song would do well at Eurovision due to Raphael's background story and Israel's general media attention. Israeli musician Ron Bitton also criticised the inclusion of French in Maariv but encouraged Jewish people to vote for the song regardless, writing that "unfortunately, we won't win this year, but as I said, our strength is in our unity, so let's hope that the Jewish communities around the world will help place the song high with their votes."

=== Eurovision-related and international media ===
Amongst international media, the reception was also mixed. In a Wiwibloggs review containing several reviews from several critics, the song was rated 5.13 out of 10 points, earning 31st out of the 37 songs competing in that year's Eurovision in the site's annual ranking that year. Jon O'Brien, a writer for Vulture, ranked the song 31st overall, writing that the song was similar to Eden Golan's "Hurricane" and that while he expected the song to receive a high televote score, "there are better entries for the ballad-favoring juries to award their douze points to". Rob Picheta, writer for American outlet CNN, ranked it 20th out of the 26 finalists in Eurovision 2025, stating that it was "weaker" compared to "Hurricane". The Times' Ed Potton ranked it 17th out of the 26 finalists, rating the song two out of five stars and describing it as a "bland message of hope... this is nothing we’ve not heard before". In contrast, ESC Beat's Doron Lahav ranked the song fourth overall, writing that the song "is written beautifully", praising Raphael as a "versatile vocalist" and the lyrics for being "simple, yet effective".

The Daily Telegraph's Neil McCormick described the song as a "straight up mushily sentimental orchestral ballad" that was "simple and emotional". Another reporter from The Daily Telegraph, Ed Power, put the song on his top 10 finalists to watch list, writing that it was "an old-fashioned, hair-dry barnstormer". The BBC's Mark Savage stated that the song was a strong ballad that "sets the bar again". Yle's Eva Frantz gave the song a 7 out of 10 rating. While she criticised Israel for "us[ing] the allegedly non-political Eurovision as a political platform", she admitted that "the acting may be ugly but the singing is beautiful". Aftenposten's Robert Hoftun Gjestad rated the song 6 out of 6, stating that the song was the "most poignant ballad of the year" musically, praising the usage of Hebrew in the song's chorus. Anne-Marie David, a past Eurovision representative for Luxembourg and France in 1973 and 1979 respectively, praised the orchestral composition and story of the song, stating that it was "very beautiful and full of hope". Multiple prominent Jewish people, including Scooter Braun and Gal Gadot, gave positive public remarks to both Raphael and the song.

== Eurovision Song Contest ==
=== HaKokhav HaBa, songwriting process ===
Israel's broadcaster for the Eurovision Song Contest, the Israeli Public Broadcasting Corporation (IPBC/Kan), utilized HaKokhav HaBa, a reality singing competition, to select their singer for the Eurovision Song Contest 2025. At the end of the competition, Yuval Raphael emerged victorious on 22 January 2025, winning the right to represent Israel in the contest. The songwriting process for the broadcaster's entry had started three weeks earlier, with an internal committee headed by Barak Itzkovitch (director of Kan's music stations) listening to 54 submissions.

==== Songwriters' conflict ====
Initially, Raphael requested to the professional committee to send a song written by Peles to Eurovision. Peles' song was chosen by the committee; however, in the immediate aftermath, a group of "more than 20 songwriters" filed a complaint to Kan, writing that the selection was a conflict of interest due to Peles being a judge on HaKokhav HaBa. Following threats to file a case to the Supreme Court of Israel, the complaint was dropped after Kan promised to reexamine its selection procedures for 2026.

=== At Eurovision ===
The Eurovision Song Contest 2025 took place at the St. Jakobshalle in Basel, Switzerland, and consisted of two semi-finals held on the respective dates of 13 and 15 May and the final on 17 May 2025. During the allocation draw on 28 January 2025, Israel was drawn to compete in the second semi-final, performing in the second half of the show. Raphael was later drawn to perform 14th in the semi-final, after Luxembourg's Laura Thorn and behind Serbia's Princ.

Prop used when the song was performed in Basel and its inspiration

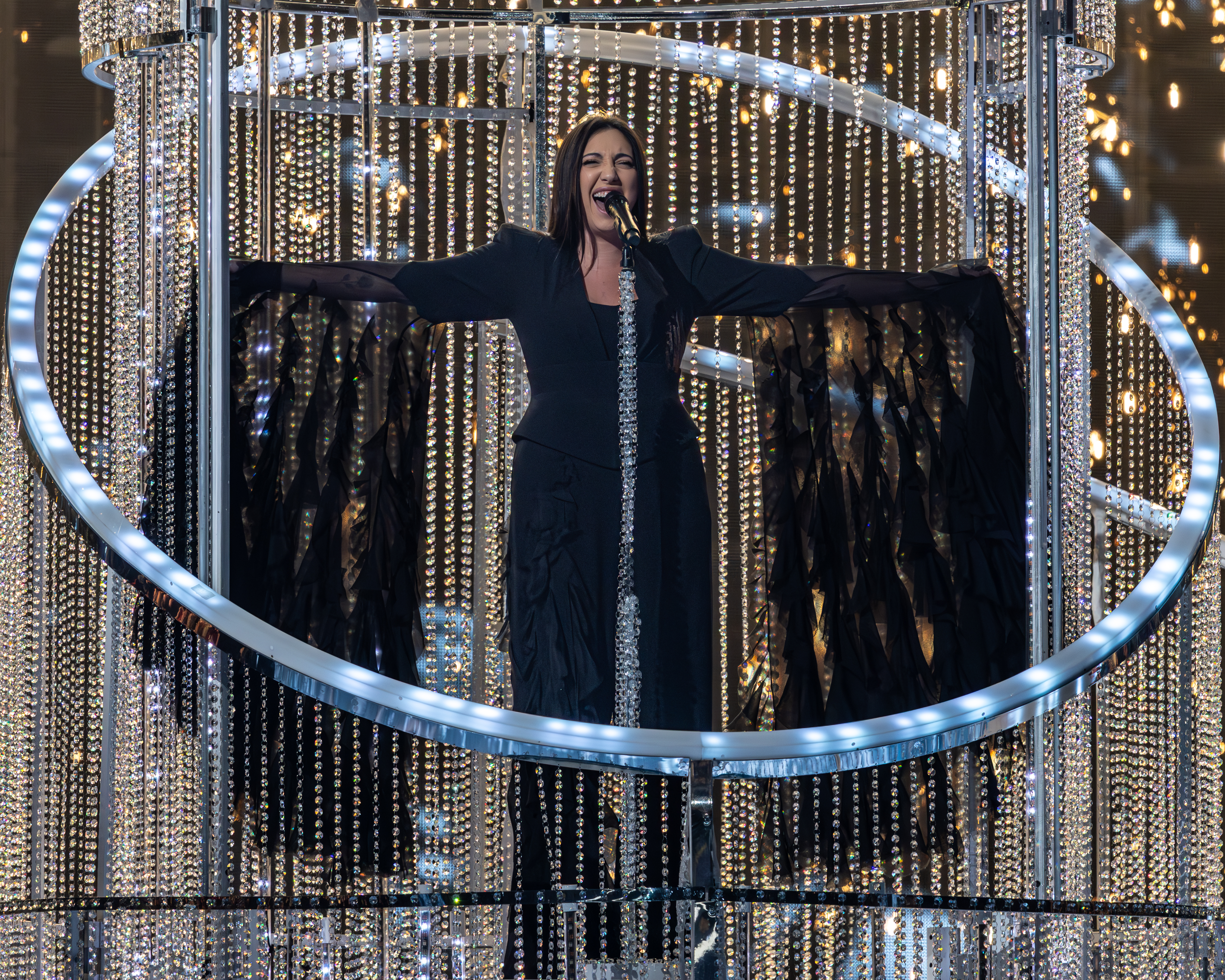
Yuval Raphael performing "New Day Will Rise" at the 2025 Eurovision Song Contest in Basel

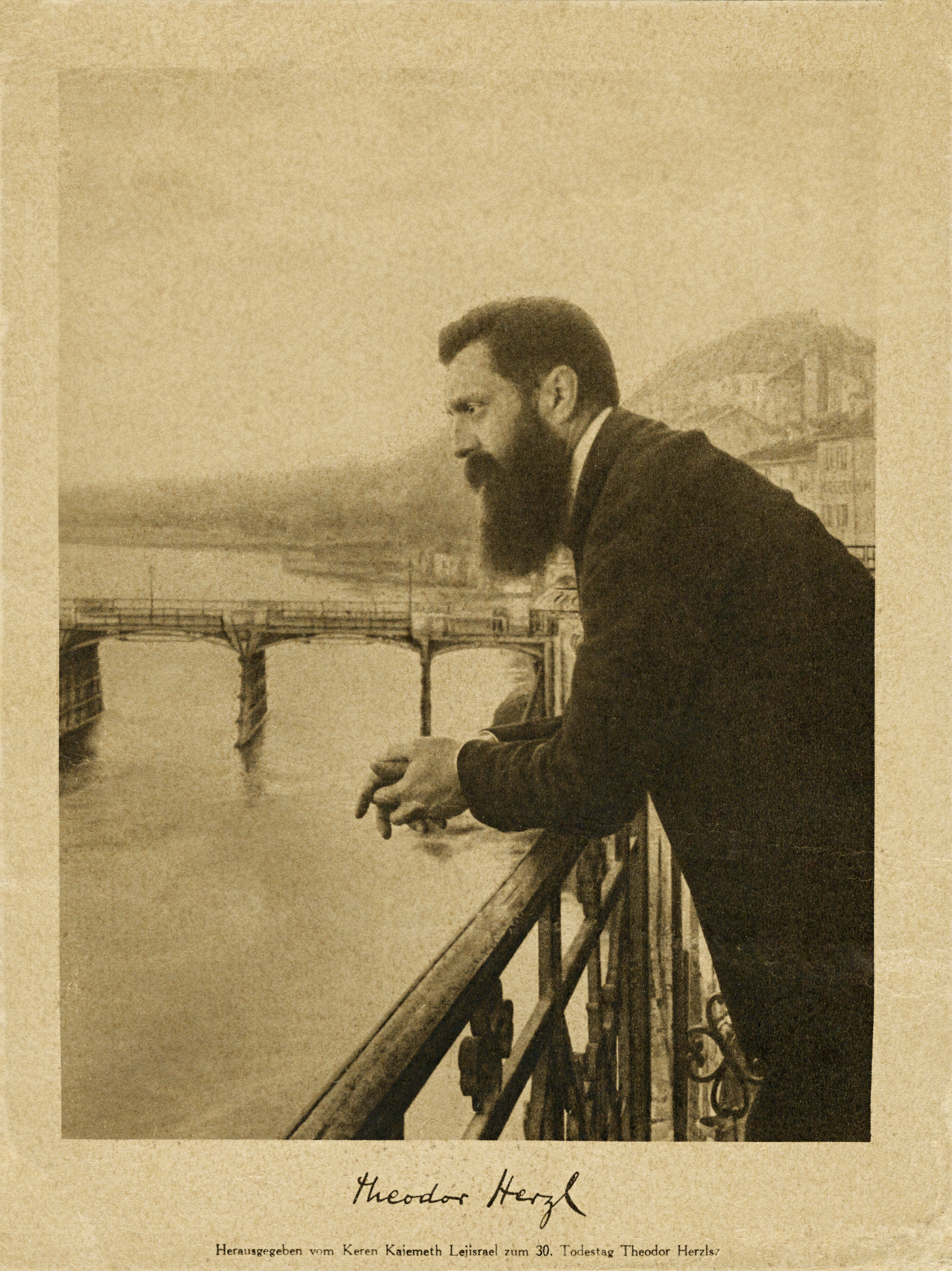
A 1901 photo of modern Zionist leader Theodor Herzl looking over a balcony in Basel

The staircase prop used at the Eurovision performance was inspired by a 1901 photo from the Fifth World Zionist Congress

For its Eurovision performance, Shai Bondar, Yuval Cohen, and Yoav Tzafir were appointed as the artistic directors. The performance featured Raphael by herself in a black dress with "square shoulders and dramatic flamenco sleeves" designed by Victor Bellaish. A 5.5 m (18 ft) chandelier staircase prop is featured predominantly throughout the performance, with Raphael climbing it and singing on top of the staircase midway through the performance. The staircase was used by ESC Beat writer Doron Lahav to make "Yuval look like a bird in a cage". According to The Times of Israel, the staircase is inspired by a 1901 photo of Theodor Herzl, one of the key founders of modern Zionism, overlooking the Rhine from a hotel balcony in Basel. During the climax of the song, pyrotechnics shoot down. In preparation for her performances, Raphael performed rehearsals with a booing machine in preparation for a possible negative reception by the arena audience. "New Day Will Rise" secured a position in the final, finishing first and receiving 203 points; 73 more than runner-up Tautumeitas' "Bur man laimi" from Latvia.

Raphael performed a repeat performance in the final on 17 May. The song performed in fourth, after Estonia's Tommy Cash and before Lithuania's Katarsis. At the end of her performance, she proclaimed, "Thank you Europe, Am Yisrael Chai." During the performance, a Dutch couple with paint attempted to storm the stage near the end of the performance; however, they were stopped before they could get on stage. The performance received mixed reactions amongst various outlets. Time Out Israel's Avishai Sela proclaimed the performance as "a spectacular human victory of love over hate... [The performance] turned out to be one that touched an entire continent, and especially the European audience that rushed to vote in droves." The Independent's Mark Beaumont criticised the performance for the staircase prop used, writing, "to sing it on an opulent, crystal-drenched staircase while our newsfeeds are full of emaciated Palestinian children in bombed-out homes still feels like a provocative move. 'New day will rise', great. But for everyone?"

Raphael ultimately finished in second place with 357 points, placing runner-up to JJ's "Wasted Love" from Austria. She achieved a split score of 60 jury points and 297 televoting points. Regarding the televote, the amount was the most received out of any finalist. In the juries, the song received one set of the maximum 12 points from Azerbaijan. In the televote, it received 13 sets of 12 points. In response to her result, Raphael stated to Israeli media that "I feel like we've won life. I can’t explain to you the level of my excitement." She later added that "all I wanted was to bring honor and pride to the country and give a second of peace. We won't have a real victory until our hostages are home. Amen, Amen, Amen." Israeli president Isaac Herzog stated in a conversation with Raphael after the contest that her performance was "tremendous. It was perfect – exceptional. I was so moved. You are truly a daughter of Israel for all of us, breaking through the highest ceiling in the world".

== Charts ==
Chart performance for "New Day Will Rise"
Chart (2025)	Peak position
Austria (Ö3 Austria Top 40)	44
Israel (Mako Hitlist)	3
Israel Domestic Airplay (Media Forest)	1
Lithuania (AGATA)	37
Netherlands (Single Tip)	18
Sweden (Sverigetopplistan)	89
Switzerland (Schweizer Hitparade)	18
UK Singles Downloads (Official Charts)	29
UK Singles Sales (OCC)	29

== Release history ==
Release history and formats for "New Day Will Rise"
Region	Date	Format(s)	Label	Ref.
Various	9 March 2025	Digital download; streaming	Tedy Productions	
