= Controversies surrounding the Eurovision Song Contest =

The Eurovision Song Contest is an international song competition organised annually since 1956 by the European Broadcasting Union (EBU) between its members who participate representing their countries. One of the stated aims of the contest is that the event is of a non-political nature, and participating broadcasters and performers are precluded from promoting or referring to anything of a political, commercial or similar nature during the contest. However, several controversial moments have occurred since the event's creation in 1956, which have included political tensions between competing countries being reflected in the contest's performances and voting, disqualification of entries due to political references in song lyrics, and demonstrations against certain countries competing due to said country's politics and policies.

== Armenia and Azerbaijan ==
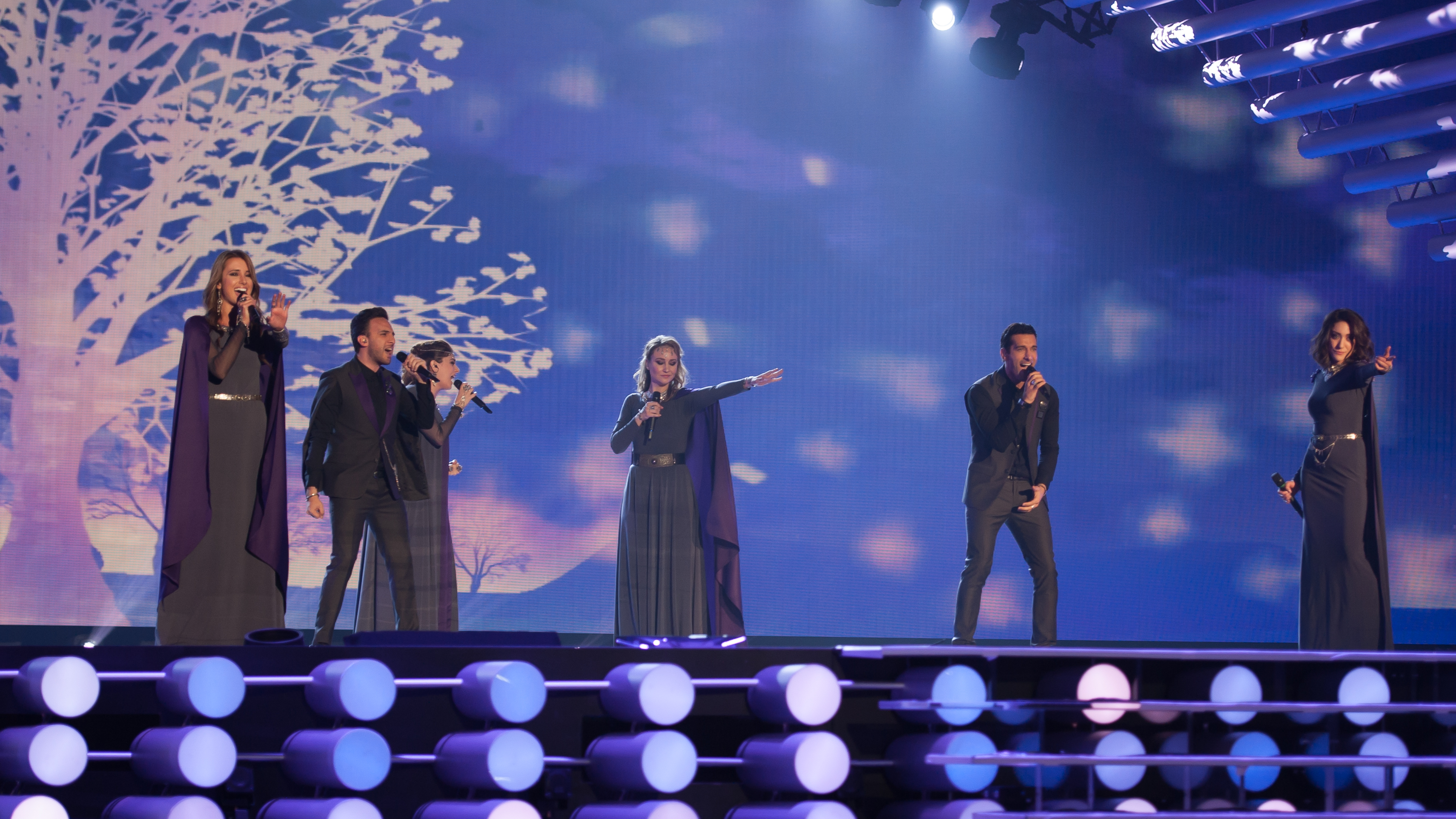
"Face the Shadow", the entry performed by Genealogy for Armenia in 2015, had its original title changed due to an alleged reference to the Armenian genocide.

The conflict between Armenia and Azerbaijan has affected the contest on numerous occasions since both countries entered in the late 2000s. In 2009, a number of people in Azerbaijan who voted for the Armenian entry were reportedly questioned by Azeri police. The Armenian participating broadcaster, the Public Television Company of Armenia (AMPTV), requested for its entry to the 2015 contest to be changed from its original title "Don't Deny" to "Face the Shadow", following claims that it contained a call for recognition of the Armenian genocide, which would violate contest rules regarding political statements. Controversy erupted again in 2016 when Armenia's representative Iveta Mukuchyan was shown waving the flag of the Republic of Artsakh, also known as Nagorno-Karabakh, a breakaway state internationally recognised as a part of Azerbaijan but largely inhabited by ethnic Armenians, at the contest's first semi-final. This again contravened Eurovision rules on political gestures and resulted in disciplinary action being levied against AMPTV.

== Russia and Ukraine ==
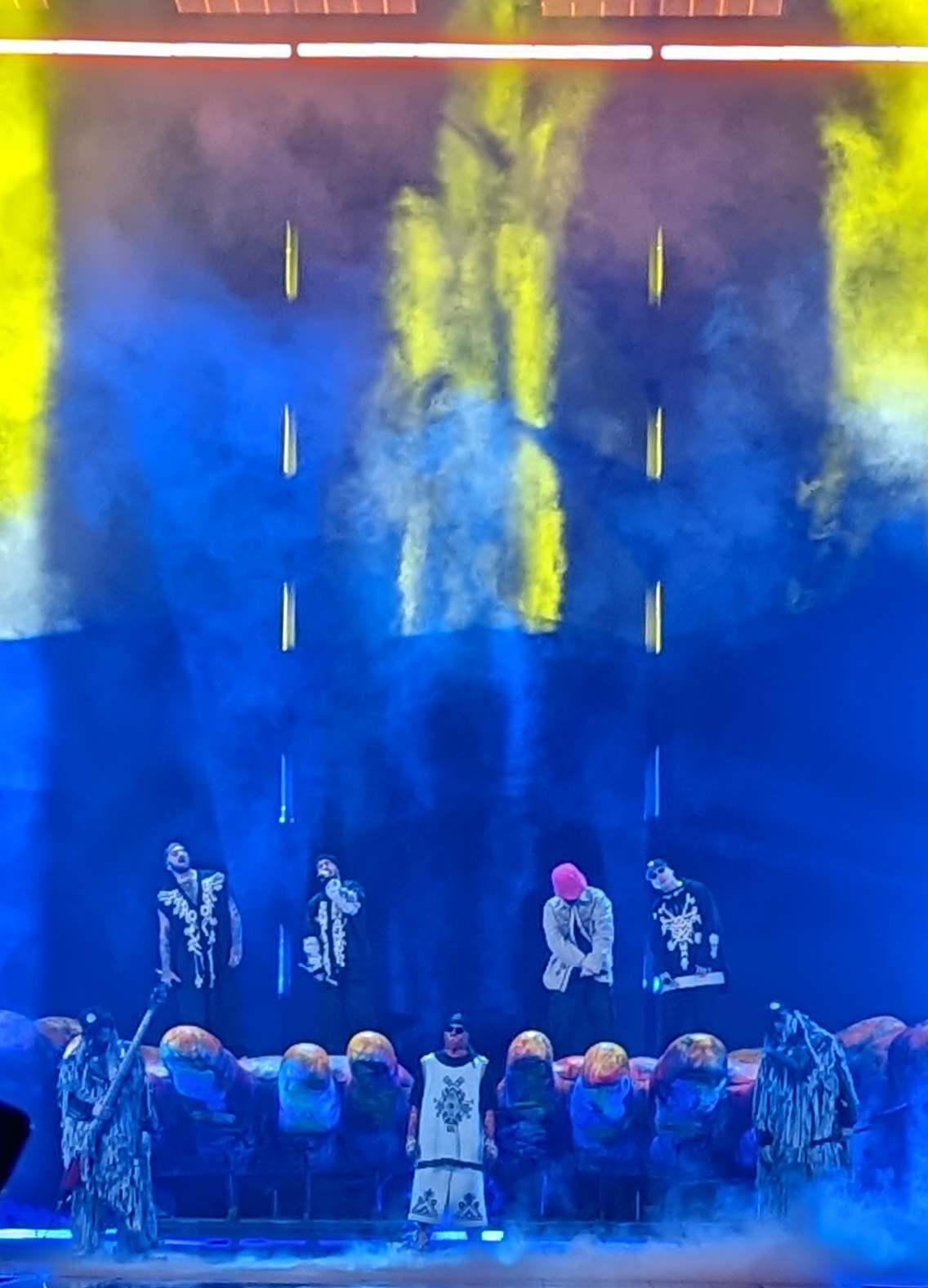
Kalush Orchestra, winners of the Eurovision Song Contest 2022 for Ukraine, performed as the opening act in the final of the 2023 contest. The 2023 event was held in the British city of Liverpool on behalf of Ukraine, which was unable to host due to the Russian invasion of the country.

Interactions between Russia and Ukraine in the contest had originally been positive in the first years of co-competition, until the Russian annexation of Crimea in 2014 and the war in Donbas that followed. In 2016, Ukraine's Jamala won the contest with the song "1944", whose lyrics referenced the deportation of the Crimean Tatars. Given the events in Crimea, many saw this song as a political statement against Russia's actions. However, the song was permitted to compete given the perceived historical nature of the song, despite protests from the Russian delegation. Calls for a Russian boycott of the 2017 contest in Kyiv were dismissed, but its representative Julia Samoylova was subsequently banned from entering Ukraine, due to breaking Ukrainian law by having performed in Crimea in 2015 and entering the region from Russia rather than going through Ukraine. Offers for Samoylova to compete remotely from a venue in Russia, or for another representative to compete in her place, were rejected by Russia's broadcaster Channel One, eventually pulling out of the contest. The EBU condemned the Ukrainian government's decision to impose a travel ban, and warned that Ukraine's broadcaster UA:PBC, which was organising that year's event, risk exclusion from future events.

In the wake of the Russian invasion of Ukraine on 24 February 2022, UA:PBC appealed to suspend Russian EBU member broadcasters RTR and Channel One from the EBU, and to exclude Russia from competing in that year's contest. The appeal alleged that since the Russian annexation of Crimea in 2014, RTR and Channel One had been a mouthpiece for the Russian government and a key tool of political propaganda financed from the Russian state budget. The EBU initially stated that Russia as well as Ukraine would still be allowed to participate in the contest, citing the non-political nature of the event. Following complaints levied by other participating broadcasters, the EBU announced on 25 February that Russia would not be allowed to take part in the 2022 contest, stating it would bring the competition into disrepute. Ukraine went on to win that edition of the contest, with the highest number of points from the televote in the contest's entire history.

Following its 2022 win, UA:PBC, rebranded to Suspilne, was initially given the opportunity to present its proposal to host the 2023 contest in Ukraine. However, the EBU later decided that the country would not be able to host due to the Russian invasion. The United Kingdom, which had finished in second place in 2022, was instead chosen to host the contest on Ukraine's behalf. Ukrainian president Volodymyr Zelenskyy requested to address the audience during the final of that year's contest, but it was rejected by the EBU on the basis of its wish to not politicize the event. Ternopil, the hometown of that year's Ukrainian representatives Tvorchi, was targeted by Russian missile strikes ahead of Tvorchi's performance; the duo later held up a makeshift sign with 'Ternopil' written on it during the recap of the competing performances.

Ahead of the final of the 2026 contest, contest director Martin Green was asked by British journalist Pablo O'Hana on whether Russia could be allowed to return, to which he responded by saying that it could "theoretically" happen if the Russian broadcasters were able to demonstrate their independence from the government, and that the EBU does not automatically exclude countries involved in wars, adding that doing so would mean "getting into really difficult territory of making very subjective value judgements." O'Hana pointed out that this contradicted the EBU's statement in 2022. These comments were criticised by fans and several UK politicians; the chairman of Spanish broadcaster RTVE, José Pablo López, furthermore made a connection to the controversy surrounding Israel's continued participation, claiming that Green was trying to justify the EBU's "double standards". Green later clarified that there were no active plans or discussions for Russia to return.

== Georgian withdrawal in 2009 ==
Georgia's planned entry for the 2009 contest in Moscow caused controversy: in the aftermath of the Russo-Georgian War, Stephane and 3G were selected to compete with the song "We Don't Wanna Put In", but the EBU objected to the lyrics as they appeared to criticise then-Russian prime minister Vladimir Putin. Requests by the EBU for the lyrics of the song to be changed were refused by the group, and Georgian broadcaster GPB subsequently withdrew from the event. A number of boycotts of the contest were considered by the Baltic states over Russia's actions in Georgia, but none eventually occurred, with Estonian broadcaster ERR hosting a poll on its website to gauge public opinion on competing in Russia.

== Israeli participation ==
Israel first competed in the contest in 1973, becoming the first country from outside of Europe to enter. Its participation in the contest over the years has been at times controversial, mostly owing to the Israeli–Palestinian conflict and the wider Arab–Israeli conflict, but it has remained a regular competitor, winning four times (1978, 1979, 1998, 2018) and hosting three times (1979, 1999, 2019).

=== Reaction by Arab countries ===
The country's first appearance in 1973 was marked by an increased security presence at the contest venue in Luxembourg City than what would have been considered normal in the early 1970s, coming less than a year after the Munich massacre where 11 members of the 1972 Israeli Olympic team were killed by the Palestinian militant organisation Black September. Armed guards were stationed at the venue, and the audience in attendance were warned not to stand during the show at the risk of being shot.

The contest was regularly broadcast in the Arab world during the 1970s, but as many of these countries did not recognise Israel, their broadcasters typically cut to advertisements when Israel performed. When in 1978 it became apparent that Israel was on course to win the contest, the broadcast in many of these countries was cut short before the end of the voting, with Jordanian broadcaster JTV explaining the end of its transmission as due to "technical difficulties" and concluding its transmission with an image of daffodils; Jordanian media later announced that Belgium, the eventual runner-up, had won instead. Turkey was pressured into not taking part in the 1979 edition by Arab states who objected to a predominantly Muslim country competing in a contest hosted by Israel.

Due to Israel's participation in the contest, it is believed that many Arab states that are eligible to participate in the contest choose not to do so, however, a number of attempts have been made by some of those countries to enter. Tunisia had applied to take part in the 1977 contest, and had been drawn to perform fourth on stage, but later withdrew. Morocco competed for the first, and to date the only time, in 1980, when Israel had withdrawn from the contest due to it being held on the same night as Yom HaZikaron. (Note: The night of the 1980 contest, 19 April 1980, was the start of Yom HaZikaron, the memorial day for fallen soldiers of Israel. Contrary to claims by some sources, it was not Holocaust Memorial Day, or Yom HaShoah, which fell on 13–14 April that year.) Most recently, Lebanon had signed up to compete in the 2005 contest, and had selected "Quand tout s'enfuit" as its debut entry, to be performed by Aline Lahoud. After being told by the EBU that it would have to broadcast the entire programme in full, including the Israeli entry, Télé Liban responded that it could not guarantee this as it would be incompatible with Lebanese law. The broadcaster therefore withdrew its entry, resulting in financial penalties from the EBU due to the late withdrawal.

=== Conflicts with memorial days and Shabbat ===
Conflicts with the country's memorial days – Yom HaShoah for the victims of the Holocaust and Yom HaZikaron for fallen soldiers – resulted in Israel not being able to take part on three occasions. After winning in 1979, Israel was initially designated to host in 1980 but it ultimately declined to do so, due to financial pressures of hosting the event twice in a row. The date for the 1980 contest also fell on the Hebrew date of Yom HaZikaron, and as a result, Israel was not able to participate. This marked the second time in the contest's history where the previous year's winner could not host the contest the following year, and the first time where said winner did not compete. Another absence occurred in 1984, when the date for that year's edition clashed with Yom HaZikaron, and in 1997 when it coincided with Yom HaShoah.

Due to the preparations and rehearsals which accompany the contest, and the Saturday evening timeslot for the final, objections from Orthodox religious leaders in Israel regarding the potential interruption to Shabbat have been raised on all three times the country has hosted the event. In 1979, these objections were largely ignored and preparations for the contest were held mostly unchanged from standard. Similar objections were again raised in 1999, in addition to criticism levelled against Dana International, the contest's first transgender winner, leading to an attempt to stop the contest from being held in Israel at all. However, all of these criticisms were in vain and the contest went ahead as planned.

In the run-up to the 2019 contest, requests were once again made by Orthodox leaders for the contest not to interfere with Shabbat, with a letter penned by Yaakov Litzman, leader of the ultra-Orthodox United Torah Judaism party, to several government departments demanding that the contest not violate the holy day. Shalva Band, one of the competing entrants in the country's national selection for that year's contest, ultimately withdrew from contention when told that, should they win, they would be required to perform in rehearsals on Shabbat; the group ultimately performed as an interval act during the contest's second semi-final.

=== Israeli–Palestinian conflict ===
==== 2019 contest ====
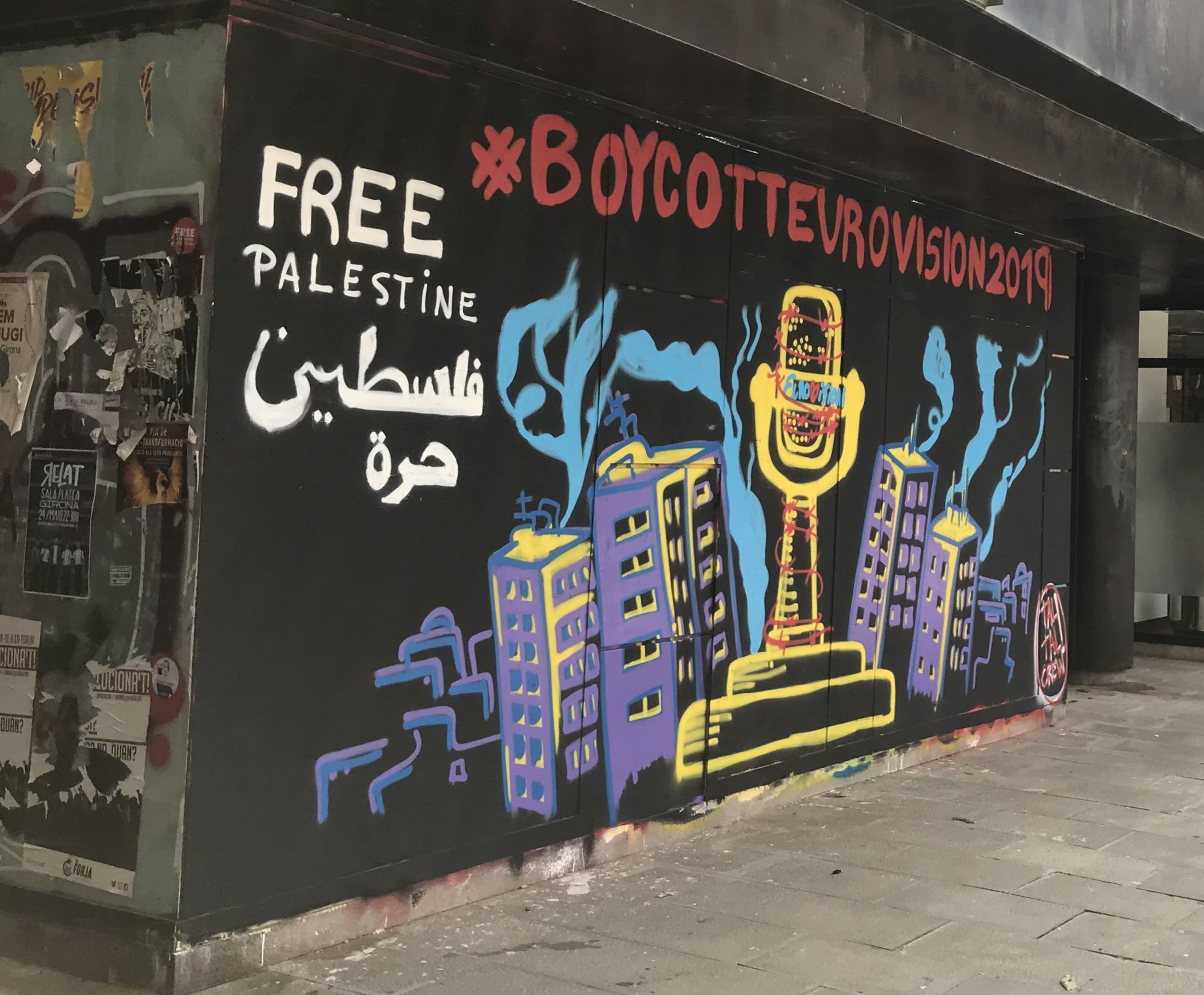
A mural in Girona, Spain, promoting a boycott of the 2019 contest in Israel

The 2019 contest also saw calls from a number of different groups for a boycott of the event, which included proponents of the Boycott, Divestment and Sanctions (BDS) movement in response to Israeli policies towards Palestinians in the West Bank and Gaza, as well as in opposition to what they see as "pinkwashing" by the Israeli government. Others campaigned against a boycott of the event, asserting that any cultural boycott would be antithetical to advancing peace in the region. During the final, interval act performer Madonna brought two supporting dancers wearing an Israeli and a Palestinian flag each on their back of their costumes, while the Icelandic entrants Hatari raised banners featuring the Palestinian flag as their televoting points were announced, which caused the Icelandic participating broadcaster RÚV to be fined €5,000.

==== 2024–present: Impact of the Gaza war ====
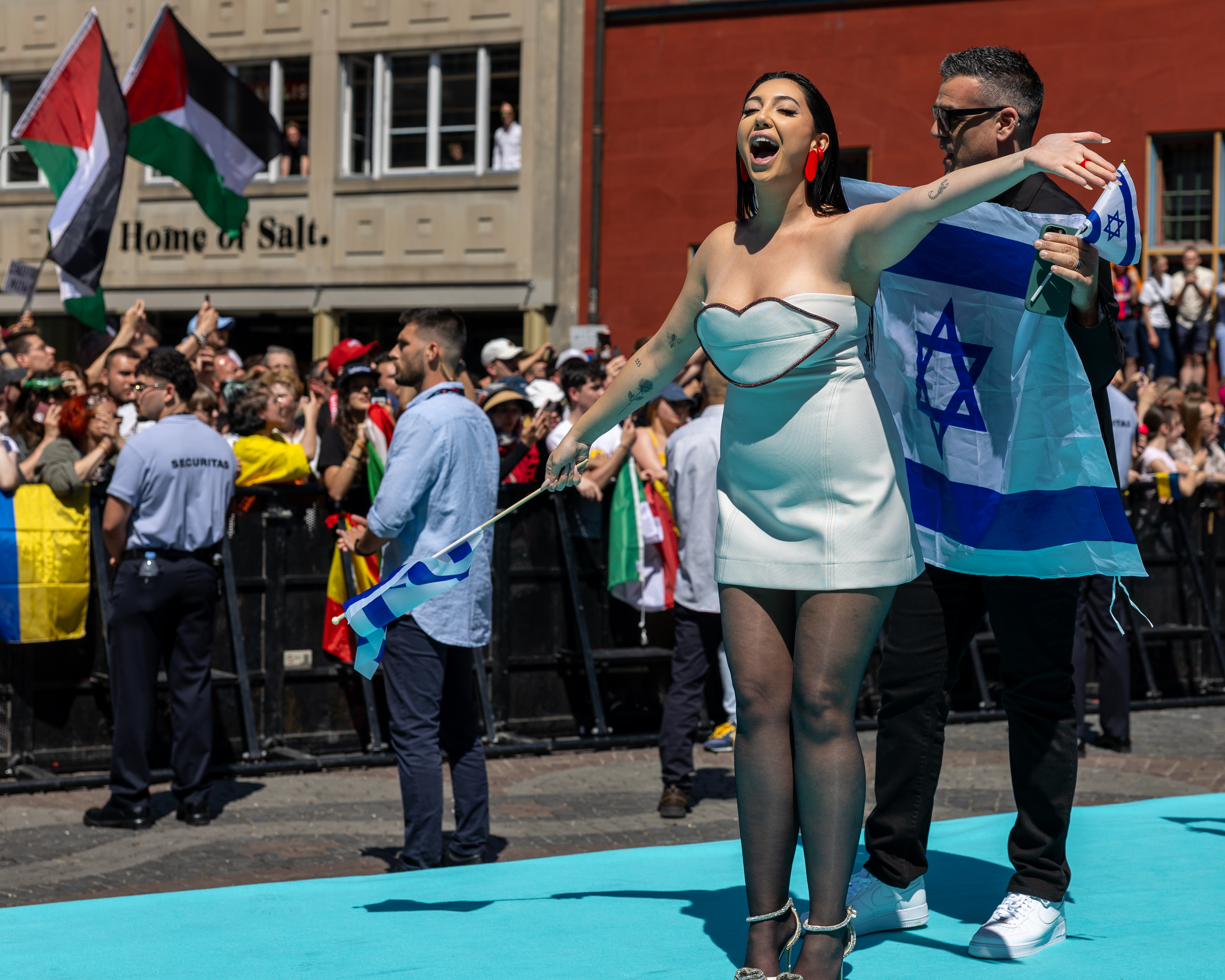
Yuval Raphael, the Israeli entrant in 2025, at the opening ceremony in Basel with pro-Palestinian demonstrations in the background

Israel's participation in the contest was again put into controversy ahead of the 2024 edition, following the outbreak of the Gaza war in October 2023 and subsequent genocide. A separate controversy erupted regarding the lyrics of the song Israel had originally submitted, "October Rain". The EBU ruled that the song was in violation of the rules, as its lyrics appeared to reference the 7 October attacks on Israel by Hamas-led Palestinian militants, which initiated the war. Israel eventually submitted a modified version of the song with a new title, "Hurricane", which was accepted by the EBU to compete. Protests against Israel's participation were held in several national selection events across Europe in the lead-up to the contest, as well as in the host city Malmö during the event. The performances of the Israeli entrant Eden Golan on stage were met with booing from the audience, which was reportedly suppressed in the live television broadcast. Several Israeli fans, delegates, and journalists were also reported to have harassed other artists and delegations backstage, leading some participating broadcasters to lodge complaints over an unsafe working atmosphere; the Israeli delegation in turn accused other delegations of "immense pressure and an unprecedented display of hatred". Nemo, who won for Switzerland, returned their trophy to the EBU in December 2025 in protest against Israel's presence in the contest.

Acts of discontent continued into the 2025 contest, where during the third dress rehearsal for the second semi-final, "six people with whistles and 'oversized' Palestinian flags" started disrupting Yuval Raphael's performance. On 6 May 2025, 72 former Eurovision contestants signed an open letter calling for Israel to be excluded from the contest, accusing the EBU of normalising and whitewashing crimes against humanity and of applying a double standard compared to the exclusion of Russia in 2022. On 7 May 2025, Kevin Bakhurst, director-general of Irish broadcaster RTÉ, requested that EBU members discuss Israel's participation; he later reported that "there is a commitment from the EBU to have a wider discussion [...] in due course", without providing further details. Following the final, in which Israel won the public vote and finished second overall, several broadcasters raised concerns with the voting system and requested a rework; an investigation by the EBU's fact-checking initiative Eurovision News Spotlight revealed that the Israel Government Advertising Agency had conducted a cross-platform advertising campaign to encourage and boost public votes for Israel's entry. Spanish prime minister Pedro Sánchez and that year's winner JJ joined calls to exclude Israel from the competition, with the former also citing a double standard in comparison to Russia.

Ahead of the 2026 contest, RÚV, RTÉ, the Netherlands' AVROTROS, Spain's RTVE, and Slovenia's RTVSLO expressed their dissatisfaction with Israel's presence in the contest, and all five announced that they would boycott the event after Israel was permitted to compete. The former three are maintaining their boycott in 2027, while the remaining two have yet to issue statements on whether they would participate. NPO, the umbrella organisation of the Dutch public broadcasting system, initially announced in September 2026 that it would take over responsiblility over the Dutch entry from 2027 onwards, but it reversed that decision by October, citing a lack of support among its members. The EBU amended the contest's rules ahead of the 2027 edition to bar a winning broadcaster from hosting the following edition if "an armed conflict or sensitive geopolitical situation affects the security of their state or region"; several outlets interpreted this as a response to concerns of a possible Israeli win and hosting amidst the war.
