= Tomer Biran =

- Biran in October 2025

Background information
- Born: Tomer Biton; July 10, 1976 (age 50); Ofakim, Israel
- Occupations: Record producer; Composer; Music arranger; Songwriter; Singer
- Years active: 2000–present
- Website: www.tomerbiran.com

Tomer Biran (born July 10, 1976) is an Israeli record producer, composer, music arranger, songwriter and singer. His work encompasses record production, music for film and television, and international advertising campaigns. He has produced and arranged recordings for Israeli artists including Hanan Ben Ari, Amir Dadon and Shiri Maimon, and his international recording credits include work with Amir, Luis Fonsi and Nicole Scherzinger. Music he created has been featured in American productions including The Sopranos, Sex and the City and Lord of War.

In 2025, Biran produced and arranged "New Day Will Rise", performed by Yuval Raphael as Israel's entry in the Eurovision Song Contest 2025. The song finished in second place.

== Biography ==
=== Early life ===
Biran was born Tomer Biton in Ofakim, Israel, to David and Yaffa Biton. His siblings are sound designer Assaf Biton and fashion designer Yarden Biton. After completing his military service, he moved to Tel Aviv.

=== Career ===
==== Early career ====
Biran began his career working with Israeli singer and musician Haim Zinovich. He contributed compositions and musical arrangements to Zinovich's 2000 album The Tears of Today Are the Honey of Tomorrow (הדמעות של היום הן הדבש של מחר), including the song "Hevel Hachen Sheker Hayofi". He was also involved in Zinovich's subsequent 2001 album Veha'esh Tamshich Liv'or (ושהאש תמשיך לבעור).

==== Record production and arrangements ====
In 2007, Biran arranged "Abba" for Shlomi Shabat. The song reached third place on the 2008 annual Hebrew-language singles chart. In 2008, he arranged Shabat's recording of "Niguna Shel Hashchuna" for the Avoda Ivrit project.

In 2008, Biran arranged and produced "Helek Mimcha" for Shiri Maimon.

Biran also worked with singer-songwriter Amir Dadon, arranging recordings including "Or Gadol" (2010), "Lo Stam" (2012) and "Kol Yom Kmo Nes" (2015).

In 2012, he arranged "Shamayim" for Yigal Bashan. The song reached number one on the Hebrew-language singles chart. In 2019, following Bashan's death, Biran completed the recording of "Tabiti Bi", inviting guitarists Avi Singolda, Shmulik Budagov and Yonatan Prig' to contribute.

In 2019, Biran arranged and produced two Israeli recordings: "Shevet Achim VeAchayot", performed by a collective of Israeli artists, and "Aluf HaOlam", performed by Hanan Ben Ari.

His collaboration with Ben Ari continued with the recordings "Im Tirtzi", "Shemesh", "Amen Al Hayeladim", "Shvurei Lev", "Holem Kmo Yosef", "Hanania", "Ela Bi" and "Moledet". "Im Tirtzi" was named Song of the Year on Kan Gimel's annual Hebrew-language music chart in 2020.

Other artists for whom Biran has provided arrangements include Rita, Marina Maximilian, Yuval Dayan, Raviv Kaner and the duo Carakukly.

==== International collaborations ====
Biran has contributed to recordings and projects involving international artists Luis Fonsi, Nicole Scherzinger, Saucy Santana, Coi Leray and Snoop Dogg, including French-Israeli singer Amir Haddad.

In 2021, Biran co-wrote and co-produced "She's Bingo", a recording by MC Blitzy featuring Luis Fonsi and Nicole Scherzinger. Biran and Fonsi were credited as producers, with Joel Iglesias as co-producer. The song's writing credits include Daniel Vangarde, Jean Kluger, Fonsi, Biran and Roy Uadri.

In 2022, Biran produced the sample replay used in "Booty", a single by Saucy Santana featuring Latto. The sample was incorporated into the track's production by Johnny Goldstein. Biran is credited with drums and percussion on the recording.

In 2023, Biran contributed the musical sample used in "My Body" by Coi Leray, which was incorporated into the recording's production by Johnny Goldstein. Biran is credited with bass and horn instrumentation on the track.

In 2025, Biran collaborated with French-Israeli singer Amir on three songs from the album C amir², released by Parlophone France. He co-composed and produced "Nous", "Avec toi" and "Je te dis tout", and was also credited with arrangements and string arrangements on "Avec toi" and "Je te dis tout". For "Nous", Biran shared composition credits with Amir Haddad and Nazim Khaled. He co-composed "Avec toi" with Nuriel Yashar and "Je te dis tout" with Haddad and Khaled. His additional contributions included instrumental performances, programming and string arrangements.

Biran was also credited with the music for SodaStream's 2020 advertising campaign "The Small Things", featuring Snoop Dogg.

==== Film and television ====
Biran has composed and arranged music for Israeli and international film and television productions.

During his early career, he collaborated with Haim Zinovich on music used in several American television series, including The Sopranos, Sex and the City, Felicity, Third Watch and Malcolm in the Middle.

Their music was also featured in American films, including Lord of War (2005), Catwoman (2004) and Click (2006).

The song "D-Tune", performed by Zino & Tommy and written by Biran and Zinovich, was included in the soundtrack of Lord of War, starring Nicolas Cage. The film's soundtrack credits list Biran under the name Tommy Biran.

In Israel, Biran composed and arranged music for television productions including HaYisraelim, HaChaverim Shel Naor, Malabi Express and HaDor HaBa 24/7.

Together with Haim Zinovich, he composed opening themes for Israeli television programs including Eretz Nehederet, HaKasefet, HaShagrir, Ratzim LaDira and Erev Tov with Guy Pines.

==== Advertising and commercial music ====
Biran has composed original music and produced musical arrangements for advertising campaigns in Israel and internationally.

His commercial work includes music for Israeli companies such as Bezeq, Cellcom, Pelephone, Castro and HOT.

His work for Bezeq included musical arrangements for commercials featuring Omer Adam, Noa Kirel and Agam Buhbut. In 2018, he arranged a cover version of "Siba Tova", originally performed by Arik Sinai, for a HOT advertising campaign.

Biran has also worked on international advertising campaigns, including projects for Huawei.

He was credited as music producer on Huawei's 2016 "#BePresent" campaign, created by advertising agency LH/TBWA.

In 2019, Biran composed original music for Huawei's "Rewrite The Rules of Photography" campaign, featuring Gal Gadot. The campaign was created by advertising agency LH/TBWA Israel.

Biran was also credited with the music for Huawei's AppGallery commercial "Explore It".

In 2020, Biran was credited with the music for SodaStream's international holiday campaign "The Small Things", featuring Snoop Dogg. The campaign was directed by Jake Szymanski.

==== Eurovision Song Contest ====
In 2025, Biran produced and arranged "New Day Will Rise", written and composed by Keren Peles and performed by Yuval Raphael. The song represented Israel at the Eurovision Song Contest 2025 in Basel, Switzerland, where it finished in second place.

== Selected international credits ==
Year	Artist or project	Recording or production	Biran's credited role	Record label or client
2020	Snoop Dogg / SodaStream	"The Small Things" (advertising campaign)	Music	SodaStream
2021	MC Blitzy featuring Luis Fonsi and Nicole Scherzinger	"She's Bingo"	Co-writer, co-producer	Bingo Blitz
2022	Saucy Santana featuring Latto	"Booty"	Sample producer (sample replay)	RCA Records
2023	Coi Leray	"My Body"	Sample producer	Republic Records
2025	Amir	"Nous"	Composer, producer	Parlophone France
2025	Amir	"Avec toi"	Composer, producer, arranger, string arranger	Parlophone France
2025	Amir	"Je te dis tout"	Composer, producer, arranger, string arranger	Parlophone France

== Selected production and arrangement credits ==
The following is a selection of songs and recordings arranged by Biran. Songwriting and composition credits are listed separately from his arrangement credits.

Year	Artist	Song or release	Lyrics	Music	Arrangement
2000	Haim Zinovich	"Hevel Hachen Sheker Hayofi" (הבל החן שקר היופי)	Haim Zinovich	Haim Zinovich, Tomer Biran	Tomer Biran
2007	Shlomi Shabat	"Abba" (אבא)	Doron Medalie		Tomer Biran
2008	Shiri Maimon	"Helek Mimcha" (חלק ממך)	Shiri Maimon, Dor Daniel; text adaptation by Michal Bachar	Dor Daniel	Tomer Biran
2010	Amir Dadon	"Or Gadol" (אור גדול)	Amir Dadon		Tomer Biran
2012	Amir Dadon	"Lo Stam" (לא סתם)	Amir Dadon		Tomer Biran
2012	Yigal Bashan	"Shamayim" (שמיים)	Yigal Bashan		Tomer Biran
2015	Amir Dadon	"Kol Yom Kmo Nes" (כל יום כמו נס)	Amir Dadon, Tal Raviv		Tomer Biran
2017	Rivka Zohar and Liron Lev	"Ad Shenit'orer" (עד שנתעורר)	Noam Horev	Liron Lev	Tomer Biran
2019	Marina Maximilian	"Bo'er Bi Hashinui" (בוער בי השינוי)	Marina Maximilian		Tomer Biran
2019	Various artists	"Shevet Achim VeAchayot" (שבט אחים ואחיות)	Doron Medalie	Idan Raichel	Tomer Biran
2019	Rita	"Bati Elecha" (באתי אליך)	Noam Horev	Loren Peled	Tomer Biran
2019	Hanan Ben Ari	"Aluf HaOlam" (אלוף העולם)	Hanan Ben Ari	Hanan Ben Ari, Nathan Goshen	Tomer Biran
2020	Hanan Ben Ari	"Im Tirtzi" (אם תרצי)	Hanan Ben Ari		Tomer Biran
2020	Hanan Ben Ari	"Shemesh" (שמש)	Hanan Ben Ari		Tomer Biran
2020	Hanan Ben Ari	"Amen Al Hayeladim" (אמן על הילדים)	Hanan Ben Ari		Tomer Biran
2020	Hanan Ben Ari	"Shvurei Lev" (שבורי לב)	Hanan Ben Ari	Hanan Ben Ari, Weinberger	Tomer Biran
2020	Shiri Maimon and Red Band	"Let Me Down"	Moran David, Bar Agay, Ari Pepper		Tomer Biran
2020	Avihai Hollander	"Lo Nirga" (לא נרגע)	Avihai Hollander, Yishai Hollander		Tomer Biran
2021	Yuval Dayan	"Ad Shega'agua Yachlof" (עד שגעגוע יחלוף)	Yuval Dayan, Avi Ohayon	Avi Ohayon	Tomer Biran
2021	Hanan Ben Ari	"Holem Kmo Yosef" (חולם כמו יוסף)	Hanan Ben Ari, Neria Ben Ari	Hanan Ben Ari	Tomer Biran
2021	Hanan Ben Ari	"Dor" (דור)	Hanan Ben Ari		Tomer Biran
2021	Hanan Ben Ari	"Makom" (מקום)	Hanan Ben Ari		Tomer Biran
2021	Carakukly	"Hakol Oto Davar" (הכל אותו דבר)	Liron Carakukly, Tali Carakukly		Tomer Biran
2022	Carakukly	"Lo Po" (לא פה)	Liron Carakukly, Tali Carakukly, Gil Vain		Tomer Biran
2022	Lior Narkis and Narkis	"Echad LeMillion" (אחד למיליון)	Tslil Klifi, Narkis	Tslil Klifi, Lior Abramov	Tomer Biran
2022	Raviv Kaner	"Mayim Amukim" (מים עמוקים)	Tslil Klifi	Tslil Klifi, Eran Kashi	Tomer Biran
2022	Hanan Ben Ari	"Hanania" (חנניה)	Hanan Ben Ari		Tomer Biran
2022	Hanan Ben Ari	"Ela Bi" (אלא בי)	Hanan Ben Ari		Tomer Biran
2023	Hanan Ben Ari	"Chutz MiKaduregel" (חוץ מכדורגל)	Hanan Ben Ari		Tomer Biran
2023	Hanan Ben Ari	"Moledet" (מולדת)	Hanan Ben Ari		Tomer Biran
2024	Hanan Ben Ari	"Atalef Iver" (עטלף עיוור)	Hanan Ben Ari		Tomer Biran
2025	Yuval Raphael	"New Day Will Rise"	Keren Peles		Tomer Biran
2025	Hanan Ben Ari	"Hashivenu" (השיבנו)	Book of Lamentations	Hanan Ben Ari	Tomer Biran
2025	Hanan Ben Ari	"Ahavat Chayai" (אהבת חיי)	Hanan Ben Ari		Tomer Biran
2026	Hanan Ben Ari	Lo HaMeshuga HaYachid (לא המשוגע היחידי) (album)	Hanan Ben Ari and other contributors		Tomer Biran
2026	Hanan Ben Ari and Pe'er Tasi	"Halevai" (הלוואי)	Pe'er Tasi, Hanan Ben Ari, Eitan Darmon		Tomer Biran
