= Yuval Raphael =

Israeli singer (born 2000)

Yuval Raphael יובל רפאל
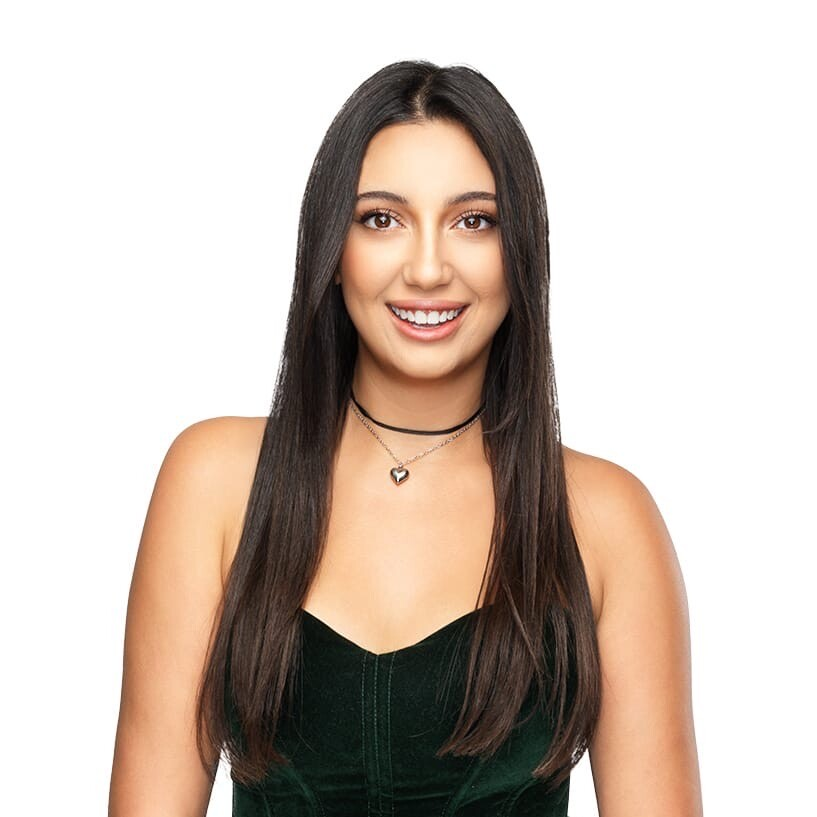
- Raphael in 2025

Background information
- Born: 5 November 2000 (age 26); Tel Aviv, Israel
- Origin: Ra'anana, Israel
- Genres: Pop; ballad
- Occupations: Singer; songwriter
- Instrument: Vocals
- Years active: 2024–present

Yuval Raphael (Note: Hebrew: יוּבַל רְפָאֵל, pronounced [juˈval ʁefaˈʔel]) (born 5 November 2000) is an Israeli singer and songwriter. Having won the eleventh season of the singing competition HaKokhav HaBa, she represented Israel in the Eurovision Song Contest 2025 with the song "New Day Will Rise", finishing in second place.

== Biography ==
Yuval Raphael was born in Tel Aviv, Israel, on 5 November 2000, to Liat and Zvika Raphael, and she is the niece of businesswoman Ronit Raphael. She grew up in Pedaya, Israel, and spent three years of her childhood in Geneva, Switzerland. As a child, she listened to rock bands such as Led Zeppelin and the Scorpions, and singers such as Beyoncé and Céline Dion. During her school years, Raphael pursued theater and Arabic studies. After finishing high school, Raphael served as a checkpoint combat soldier in the Jerusalem area with the Military Police Corps of the Israel Defense Forces (IDF). She began singing professionally in 2024.

Raphael was attending the Supernova Sukkot Gathering, an open-air music festival near Re'im on 7 October 2023, when Hamas attacked the festival. She hid inside a bomb shelter near Be'eri with 50 other people, while sustaining shrapnel injuries from grenades thrown into the shelter. Raphael was one of 11 survivors, having hid under dead bodies for eight hours. In a speech before the United Nations Human Rights Council (UNHRC) in March 2024, she described what she witnessed during the massacre.

== Career ==
=== HaKokhav HaBa L'Eirovizion ===
On 19 November 2024, Raphael's audition for the eleventh season of HaKokhav HaBa which served as the Israeli artist selection for the Eurovision Song Contest 2025, aired, where she performed "Anyone" and advanced to the next round with a score of 98%. She eventually progressed to the final on 22 January 2025, where she performed "Dancing Queen" and "Writing's on the Wall". She dedicated her performance of the former to those killed by the Nova music festival massacre. She ranked first and was chosen to represent Israel at Eurovision Song Contest 2025, succeeding Eden Golan, whose appearance on the previous edition had attracted controversy as a result of her country's involvement in the Gaza war. At the time of her announcement, she was living in Ra'anana.

=== Eurovision Song Contest 2025 ===
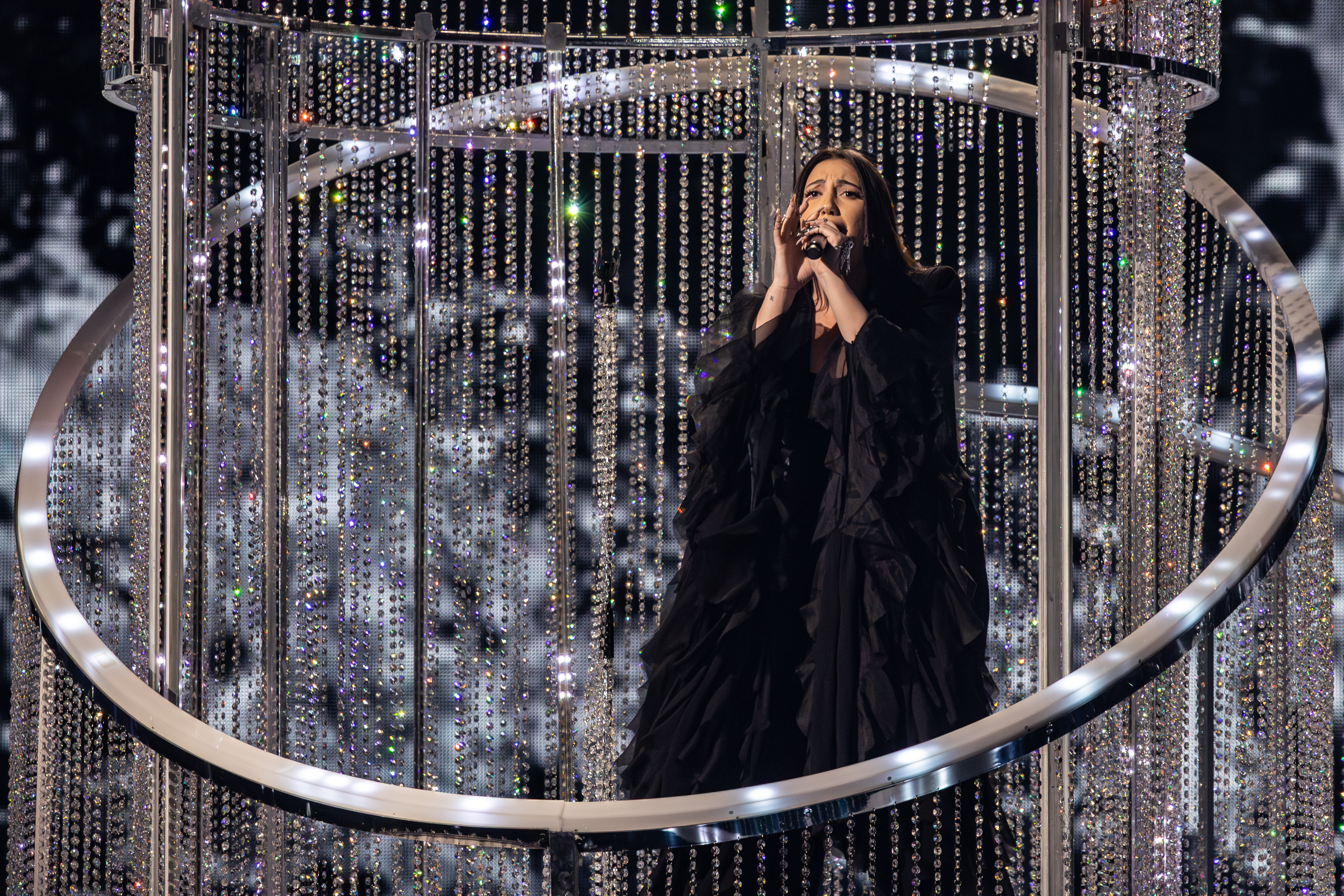
Raphael performing at the Eurovision Song Contest 2025

Raphael represented Israel at the Eurovision Song Contest 2025 with the song "New Day Will Rise", written and composed by Keren Peles and produced by Tomer Biran. The entry was presented on 9 March 2025 together with its official music video, released by the Israeli Public Broadcasting Corporation (IPBC/Kan). The song was described by media as a multilingual orchestral pop ballad featuring lyrics in English, French, and Hebrew and incorporating Hebrew Bible verse from the Song of Songs, symbolising hope, unity, and renewal.

Israel was drawn to compete in the second semi-final, held on 15 May 2025 in Basel, Switzerland. Raphael performed 14th out of 16 entries and qualified for the final after winning the semi-final with a total of 203 points from the televote.

In the final on 17 May 2025, Raphael performed fourth in the running order. Israel finished in second place overall with 357 points, winning the televote with 297 points and placed 14th with the professional juries with 60 points. "New Day Will Rise" debuted at number one on the Israeli Airplay Chart and entered the top 50 of the singles chart in Austria, Lithuania, Sweden, and Switzerland.

=== Post-Eurovision, and 22:22 ===
On 22 May 2025, Raphael performed alongside Keren Peles at Hostages Square in Tel Aviv during a public event held in solidarity with the hostages.

Her first post-Eurovision single, "Amber Skies", was released on 16 October 2025 as part of the soundtrack for the HBO Max series One Day in October. On 19 October 2025, Raphael released her debut EP 22:22, described by Raphael as a deeply personal project reflecting themes of inner peace and emotional recovery. In an interview with Mako, she stated that the recurring number "22:22" symbolizes calm and spiritual balance in her life.

On 12 June 2026, Raphael performed at the 2026 Tel Aviv Pride festival, which featured its first parade since the October 7 attacks. She gave the first public performance of her single "Papa" at the festival.

Raphael performed at the opening ceremony of the 2026 Maccabiah Games on 1 July 2026.

== Personal life ==
During HaKokhav HaBa, Raphael worked closely with fellow contestant Ido Malka, and the two later entered into a romantic relationship and announced it in March 2025. Malka accompanied Raphael as part of the Israeli delegation at Eurovision.

== Discography ==
=== Extended plays ===
List of EPs, with selected details
Title	Details
22:22	Released: 19 October 2025; Label: D-Music; Formats: Digital download, streaming

=== Singles ===
Title	Year	Peak chart positions								Album or EP
Title	Year	ISR	ISR Air.	AUT	LTU	SWE	SWI	UK Down.	UK Sales	Album or EP
"New Day Will Rise"	2025	3	1	44	37	89	18	29	29	Non-album single
"Amber Skies"	2025	—	—	—	—	—	—	—	—	One Day in October (soundtrack)
"Papa"	2026	—	19	—	—	—	—	—	—	Non-album single
"—" denotes a recording that did not chart or was not released in that territory.

=== Other charted songs ===
Title	Year	Peak chart positions	Album or EP
Title	Year	ISR Air.	Album or EP
"Yidalek ha'or"	2025	8	22:22

== Awards and nominations ==
Year	Award	Category	Nominee(s)	Result	Ref.
2025	Eurovision Awards	Outstanding Vocals	Herself	Nominated	

Awards and achievements
Preceded by Eden Golan	HaKokhav HaBa winner 2025	Succeeded by Noam Bettan
Preceded by Eden Golan with "Hurricane"	Israel in the Eurovision Song Contest; 2025	Succeeded by Noam Bettan with "Michelle"
