= If This Is Life =

If This Is Life (Im Ele HaKhaim) אם אלה החיים

Studio album by Keren Peles
- Released: July 13, 2006
- Genres: Pop, Piano pop
- Length: 43:38
- Label: Hed-Artzi
- Producer: Louie Lahav

Keren Peles chronology
If This Is Life (Im Ele HaKhaim) אם אלה החיים (2006)	The Flood (2008)

If This Is Life (Hebrew: אם אלה החיים, Im Ele HaKhaim) is the debut album by Israeli singer-songwriter Keren Peles. Three months after its release, the album sold more than 20,000 copies, making it a gold album in Israel.

== Track listing ==
1. "Zot SheBimqomi" (The One Instead of Me) זאת שבמקומי
2. "Zmanim Meshugaim" (Crazy Times) זמנים משוגעים
3. "Rakevet Be'Eiropa" (A Train in Europe) רכבת באירופה
4. "Itay" (Itay) איתי
5. "Shokhakhat Otkha" (Forgetting You) שוכחת אותך
6. "Shim'on HaShakhen" (Shimon The Neighbour) שמעון השכן
7. "Al Sfat HaKineret (Besandalim)" (On The Edge of The Kineret (with Sandals)) (על שפת הכינרת (בסנדלים
8. "SheYhye Lanu Bayit" (Wish We'll Have Home) שיהיה לנו בית
9. "'Od Yom" (Another Day) עוד יום
10. "Larutz Larutz" (Running Running) לרוץ לרוץ
11. "Yoter Miday" (Too Many) יותר מדי
12. "Evyatar" (Evyatar) אביתר
13. "Im Ele HaKhaim" (If This Is Life) אם אלה החיים
14. Bonus Track – "Peseq Zman" (Timeout) פסק זמן
