= Keren Peles =

Israeli singer

Keren Peles קרן פלס
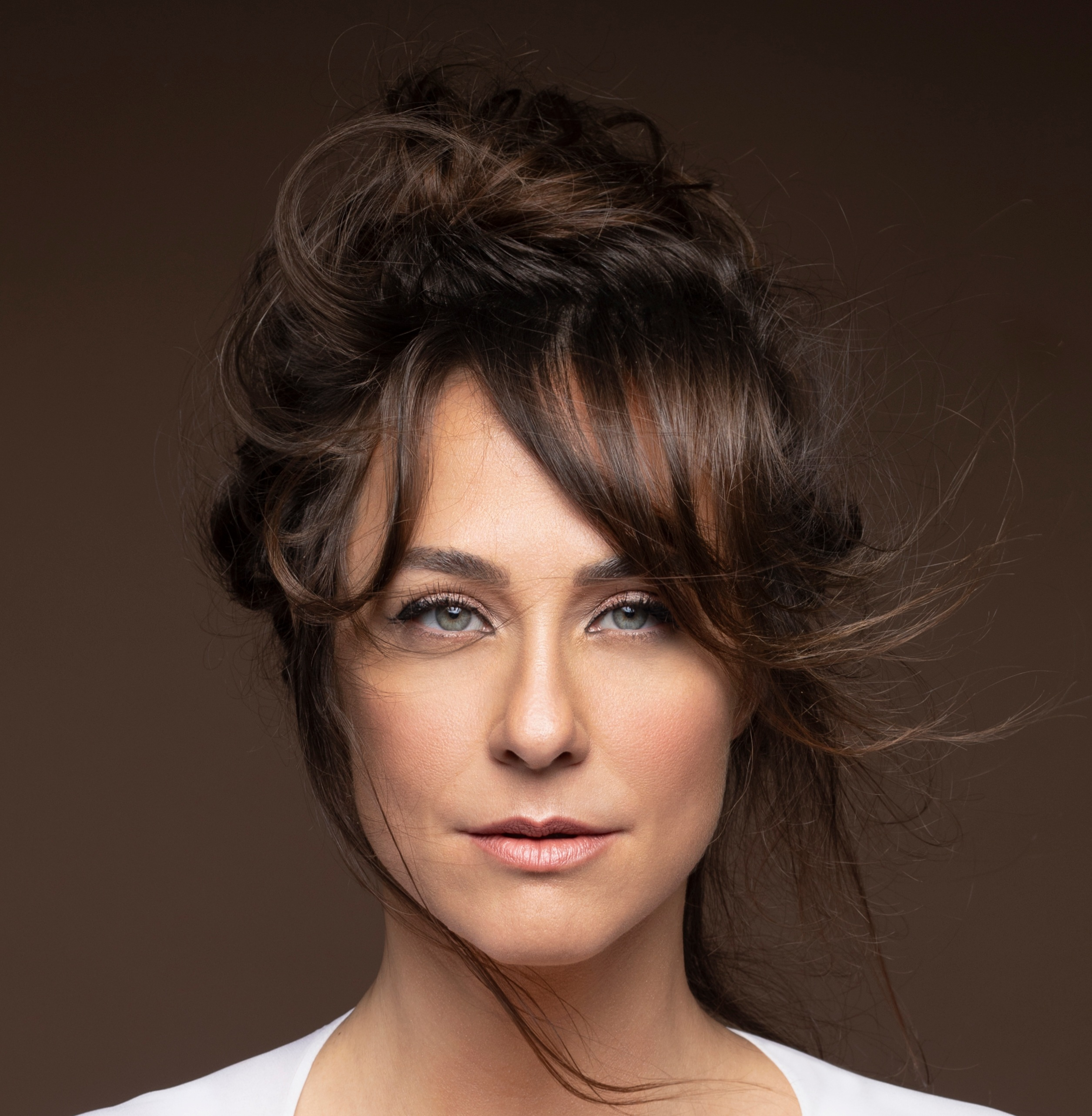
- Peles in 2017

Background information
- Born: 11 March 1979 (age 47); Yavne'el, Israel
- Genres: Piano pop; Israeli rock
- Occupations: Singer-songwriter; musician
- Instruments: Vocals; piano
- Years active: 2005–present
- Label: Hed Arzi

Keren Peles Toor (Hebrew: קרן פלס טור; born 11 March 1979) is an Israeli singer-songwriter and musician. Peles embarked her musical career in Israel in 2005 as a songwriter and later with her debut album Im Ele Ha'Hayim (2006), and has released six studio albums to date. She is a frequent collaborator of singer Miri Mesika whose many songs she has written and of musician Rami Kleinstein, with whom she toured extensively and released two live albums. She has cited Naomi Shemer, Shlomo Artzi and Tori Amos among her musical influences.

Among her accolades, Peles received the Israeli Ministry of Culture and Sport Award for a Newcomer Songwriter in 2006. Peles received the Israeli Theater Award two consecutive years for her work as a composer in the Cameri Theatre productions of Thrill My Heart by Hanoch Levin (2008) and The Good Person of Szechwan by Bertolt Brecht (2009). She also received the ACUM Award, awarded by the Society of Authors, Composers and Music Publishers in Israel, twice in 2018 and 2022.

Peles co-wrote the song "Hurricane", sung by Eden Golan for Israel in the Eurovision Song Contest 2024, which came fifth. She also wrote "New Day Will Rise", sung by Yuval Raphael for Israel in the Eurovision Song Contest 2025, which came second.

== Career ==
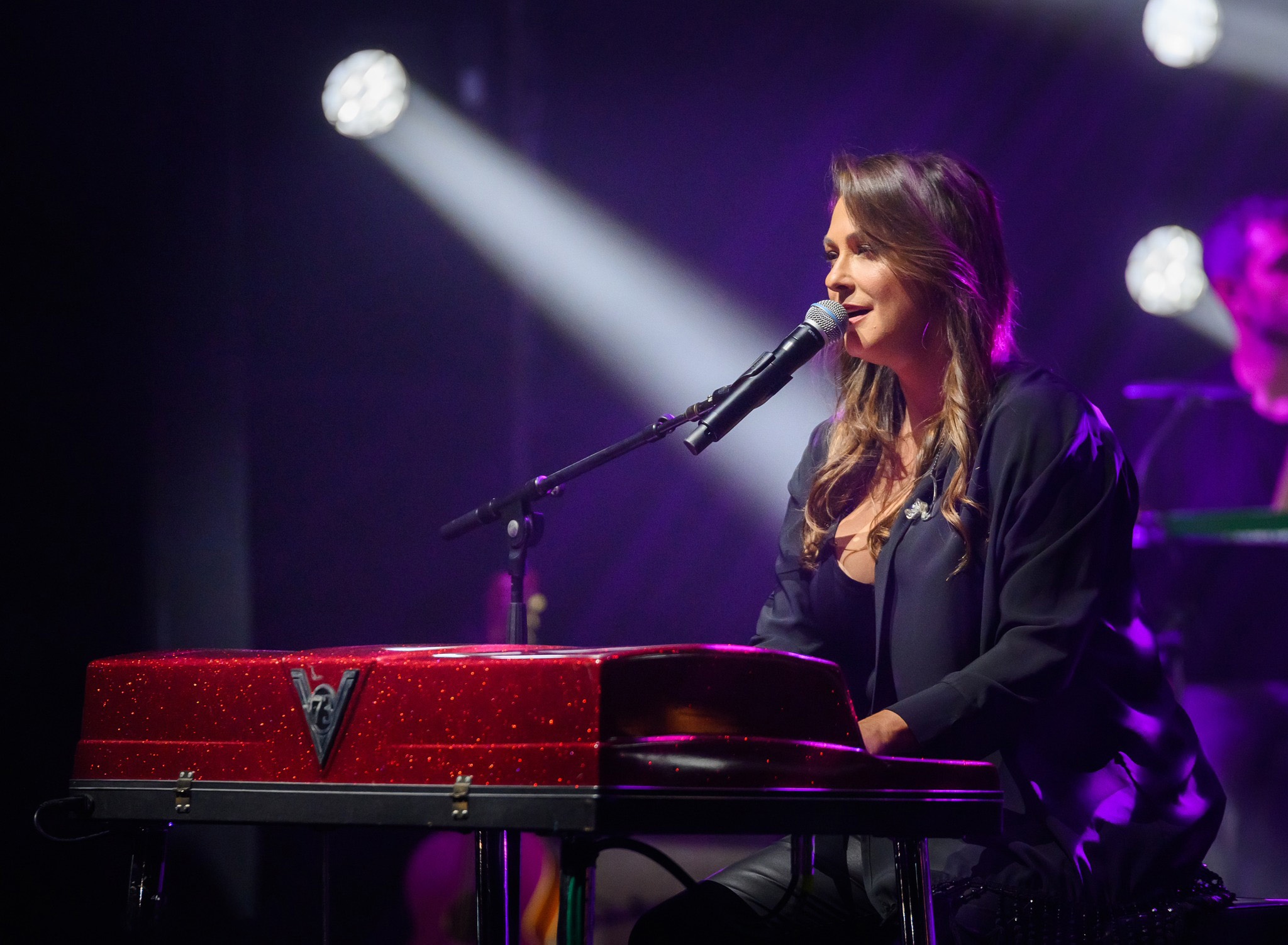
Peles performing in 2022

Peles graduated from the Rimon School of Jazz and Contemporary Music. In 2005, she became famous for her songwriting for Miri Mesika and Shiri Maimon.

Peles' debut album, If This Is Life was released in July 2006 and certified gold after selling 20,000 copies. She wrote all of its songs. She was nominated for female singer of the year (2006) by Galgalatz, and named Israeli Singer of the Year by the Israeli radio stations.

In April 2008, her second album, Mabool (Flood), was released. In September it went gold and months later she was named Israel's Singer of the Year again.

Peles has written songs for Harel Skaat, Amir Fey Gutman, and Boaz Mauda ("Oreach Ba'olam").

In December 2018, she released the song "Transparent" in collaboration with Ron Buhnik. The song became a hit when it topped the Media Forest chart. On 2 April 2019, she released a second single in collaboration with Bohnik, "Across the River", it was accompanied by a music video filmed in New York.

== Personal life ==
Peles was in a 3 year relationship with singer-songwriter Itai Pearl, and wrote her song "Itai" on the couple's relationship.

Keren Peles married website developer Tomer Grencel in June 2009. The couple separated in 2010. From 2011 to 2023, she was in a relationship with Noam Tor. Together, they had two children, Uri and Luna, and adopted a daughter named Noa.

Her father's uncle is the singer Benny Amdursky, the father of the singer Assaf Amdursky.

Peles’s family is also of Romanian-Jewish background.

== Discography ==
If This Is Life אם אלה החיים: Released: 13 July 2006; Israel certification: Gold (20,000+ copies); Singles: Itai, If This Is Life, Simon the Neighbor, Time Out, The One Who's In My Place	Flood מבול: Released: 7 April 2008; Israel certification: Gold (20,000+ copies); Singles: Flood, She Ran Home, In A Car Next To The Sea, Picho 92, A Period Of Changes	Bein HaIr LaKfar בין העיר לכפר: Released: 31 August 2010; Israel certification: Gold (20,000+ copies); Singles: The Rest Passes, Assaf Song, Northern Flowering, A Scratched	How the sun will rise איך שהשמש תזרח: Released: 1 July 2014

Rami Kleinstein Keren Peles רמי קלינשטיין קרן פלס
- Released: 3 February 2016
- Singles: Until Return, Live, Thank You
