= Hurricane (Eden Golan song) =

2024 song by Eden Golan

Single by Eden Golan
- Released: 10 March 2024
- Genre: Pop
- Length: 2:58
- Label: Session 42
- Songwriters: Avi Ohayon; Keren Peles; Stav Beger

Eden Golan singles chronology
| "Dopamine" (2023) | "Hurricane" (2024) | "Older" (2024) |

Music video
- "Hurricane" on YouTube

Eurovision Song Contest 2024 entry
- Country: Israel
- Artist: Eden Golan
- Languages: English; Hebrew
- Composers: Avi Ohayon; Keren Peles; Stav Beger
- Lyricists: Avi Ohayon; Keren Peles

Finals performance
- Semi-final result: 1st
- Semi-final points: 194
- Final result: 5th
- Final points: 375

Entry chronology
- ◄ "Unicorn" (2023)
- "New Day Will Rise" (2025) ►

Official performance video
- "Hurricane" (Second Semi-Final) on YouTube "Hurricane" (Grand Final) on YouTube

"Hurricane" (Hebrew: הוריקן, horikan) is a song by Israeli singer Eden Golan. It was written by Avi Ohayon, Keren Peles, and Stav Beger, and released on 10 March 2024 through Session 42. Inspired by an Israeli perspective of the October 7 attacks and its emotional aftermath on Israelis according to Golan and its songwriters, it represented Israel in the Eurovision Song Contest 2024, where it finished fifth with 375 points.

The song drew heavy scrutiny for its original title "October Rain", which along with the lyrics was viewed as a political message in support of Israel in the Gaza war. As a result, the European Broadcasting Union (EBU), the organization that manages the Eurovision Song Contest, requested a rewrite of the song in late February 2024. After multiple submissions and rewrites, a final revised version, titled "Hurricane", was approved by the EBU on 7 March. The song in both variations, along with Golan herself, faced numerous unsuccessful calls for its exclusion from the contest.

Critical response to "Hurricane" was mixed. Although Golan's vocal performance was widely praised, the song was criticized for a perceived lack of originality, as well as claims that the lyrics amounted to Israeli propaganda. Criticism was also levied against the Israeli broadcaster that selects the entry for Eurovision, the Israeli Public Broadcasting Corporation (IPBC/Kan), for changing the song to fit EBU requirements despite Kan initially stating its refusal to alter it. Following Golan's performance of the song at Eurovision, it was more favourably received by Israeli and American Jewish media. "Hurricane" peaked at number one in its native country of Israel.

== Background and composition ==
"Hurricane" was written by Avi Ohayon, Keren Peles, and Stav Beger, and is described as a pop ballad. Beger joined late into the songwriting process, and later entered into a dispute with Ohayon over royalties. Before it was officially announced as Israel's song for the Eurovision Song Contest 2024, increasing public pressure was placed upon the contest's organisers, the European Broadcasting Union (EBU), to both ban Israeli participation in the contest and boycott until the country was banned due to the Gaza war. In an interview with The Times of Israel, Golan stated that despite knowing that competing in Eurovision would "not [be] simple", she nevertheless wanted to represent Israel "because of [the song's] meaning... we can bring everything we're feeling, and everything the country is going through, in those three minutes. To speak through the song to the world."

"Hurricane"
"Hurricane", a pop ballad, presented an Israeli perspective of the October 7 attacks in its first version titled "October Rain", but it was rewritten and now talks about a "young woman emerging from a personal crisis" inspired by a breakup.

Disputes exist on whether the song is solely based on an Israeli perspective of the Gaza war. Ohayon stated in interviews that "we knew we were going to write about the [Israeli] situation... We tried to do it in a way as subtle as we can, with a subtext". However, in an interview with The New York Times, Peles claimed that the song was not solely influenced by the conflict; she stated that the song was in part inspired by a recent divorce she had gone through. Peles further stated that the song was meant to reflect the general topic of the "importance of strength in tough moments". Hannah Brown, in an analysis for The Jerusalem Post, wrote that the song was "about loss and redemption". In another analysis by Israel Hayom's Eran Swissa, the song details the story of a "young woman emerging from a personal crisis".

It is reported to be a rewrite of an earlier variation of the song that was titled "October Rain", in response to it being rejected by the European Broadcasting Union to enter the Eurovision Song Contest. Brown later stated that "Hurricane", while keeping the same messages as "October Rain", used "more poetic, less specific terms". Shayna Weiss, an Israeli pop culture scholar, stated that the lyrics "can mean a lot of different things. That's probably how [the song was] allowed. But it's obvious what they mean when it's Israel's entry to Eurovision." In another analysis by Kveller's Lior Zaltzman, they stated their belief that the lyrics could be interpreted to reference world views on Israel and the advocacy for the return of Israeli hostages from Gaza captivity. Zaltzman later added that the image of a hurricane "does very much seem to describe the Israeli state of mind post-October 7".

Hours before its official release, the song was leaked in its entirety by a pro-Palestinian supporter on Twitter who proclaimed "Israel is committing genocide", later stating they leaked it to support people who wanted to pirate the song. It was officially released on 10 March 2024 in a special broadcast on Israeli channel Kan 11.

== Music video and promotion ==
Along with the song's release, an accompanying music video was released on the same day. According to Ofir Peretz, the director of the video who had previously filmed multiple Israeli commercials and pro-Israeli content during the war, it was filmed in relative secrecy, with production still progressing despite initial doubts about Israeli participation in the contest. In an interview, Peretz described the video as "my voice", which in turn was meant to represent what "[the Israeli people] went through together." Peretz described filming as "three weeks of madness. Positive madness."

Brown of The Jerusalem Post stated that she thought the music video, which featured dancers in a field, "clearly reference[d]" the Re'im music festival massacre. Peretz later confirmed Brown's comments, with Peretz stating that the image of a sun rising during the music video was a tribute to the lives lost in the massacre, stating, "The sun rose and for some people it was the last light they saw in their lives. I knew that in the end the music video should end with the sun rising. With the light that defeats the darkness. That the music video should be as dark as possible, but in the end the sun will shine and illuminate everything. We wanted to end with optimism."

In another analysis from a Ynet report by Shira Danino, the clothing was interpreted by Danino to display hidden messages relating to the 7 October attacks. Golan's clothing, which had a hole in it, was claimed to resemble a gunshot; a collar tie worn in another costume was claimed to represent a yellow ribbon, a symbol for advocation for the release of captives held by Hamas. In addition, the dancers, who wore white clothes at the beginning of the video and later switched to black clothes at the end, symbolised "white celebrations on the kibbutz lawns" and mourning, respectively.

=== Promotion ===
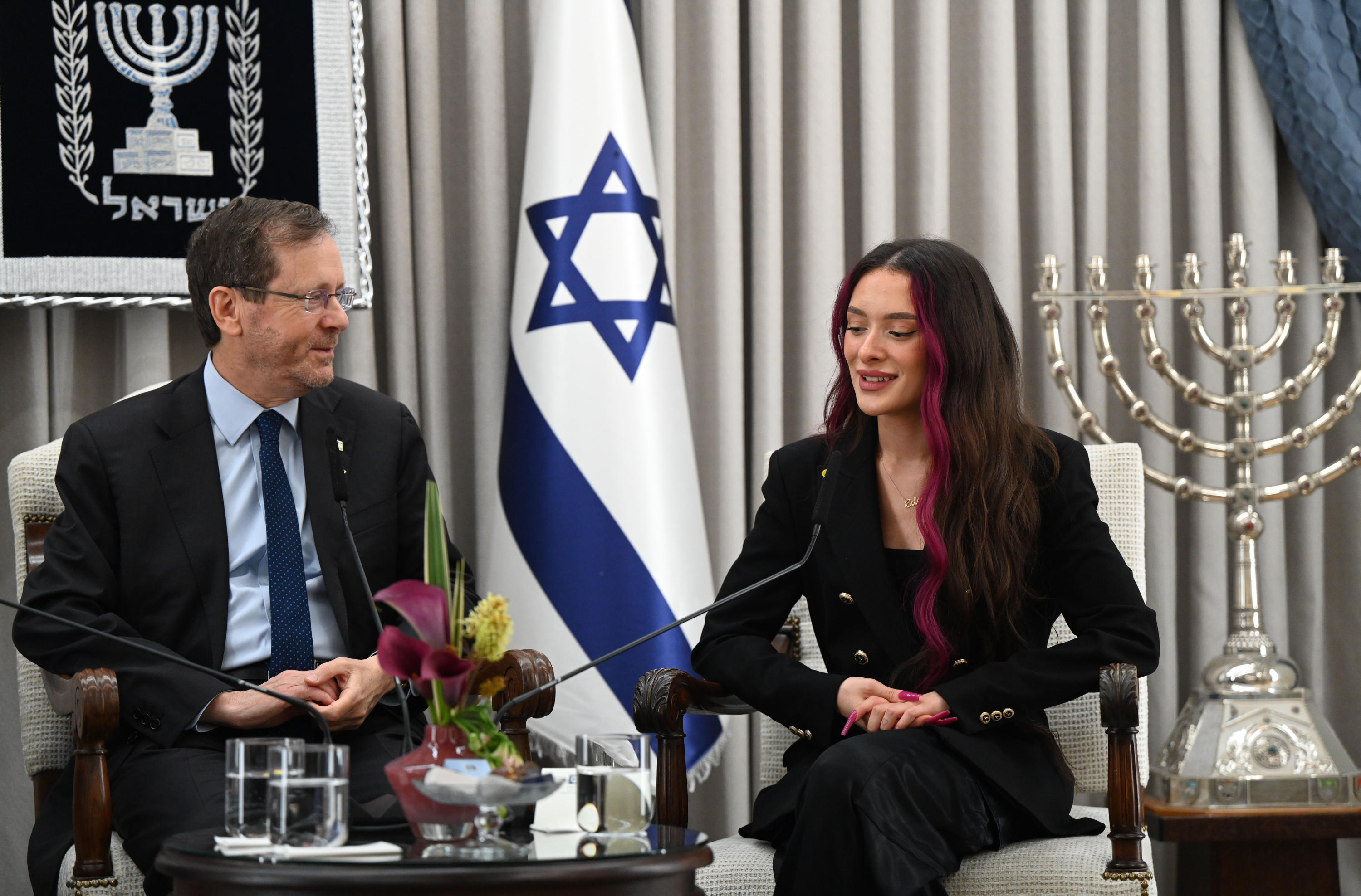
Golan and Israeli president Isaac Herzog in an Israeli government publicity photo.

To promote the song before the contest, Golan accepted an invitation to meet Israeli president Isaac Herzog for a publicity appearance in April 2024. Golan did not attend any Eurovision pre-party event despite being invited to them; however, she did make a one-off appearance at a fan event organised by OGAE Israel to promote the song.

==== Other performances ====
External videos
- "October Rain" performed in Tel Aviv, 19 May 2024 on YouTube

Around a week after the Eurovision Song Contest 2024, Golan announced her intents to perform the original variation of the song, "October Rain", for the first time at a live performance at a rally hosted by Eylon Levy advocating for the release of Israeli hostages held by Hamas. The performance was given on 19 May, with Golan stating that she wanted to perform the original version because it was her "prayer to bring everyone back home", later adding, "I will not stop making our voice heard in Israel and worldwide until everyone returns home."

== Reception ==
=== Critical response ===
==== Israeli media ====
The song in both variations has received negative reviews from local Israeli media. Noa Limone, writer for Israeli newspaper Haaretz, wrote a heavily negative review of the song's original variation. Limone derided the song for a lack of "any significant statement", stating that "even AI has more soul than this gibberish... it would have been better to send a song like 'Harbu Darbu', because at least it has something to say. Something warlike, vengeful, some say racist, but at least clear." Another Haaretz writer, Ben Shalu, wrote that "nothing in it that represents Israel", but also praised Golan's vocals and said that "Eden Golan bears no responsibility for this absurdity." Dudi Fatimer of The Jerusalem Post also wrote a negative review on the revised "Hurricane", stating that the song was "boring" and was "more suitable for Army Radio's playlist than [Eurovision]", adding their opinion that Golan should have put in more Hebrew lyrics and that "I was hoping for a song that would touch me, make me feel proud as an Israeli... this song is really not going in that direction." Nic Wolff of Israel Hayom wrote that "apparently we don't really want to win", describing the song as a "gloomy and empty ballad about a girl in crisis, without provocation and without a statement... they turned [Eden] into a pop doll without soul and inspiration." In contrast, Avishai Sela of Time Out wrote that "at first listen it is a beautiful song... a very dramatic song, but not too melancholic... It's a good quality pop ballad." Maariv's Moran Taranto Meler described it as "a strong, powerful song", proclaiming that "it will stand out in this particular year."

Einav Schiff, writer for Ynet, wrote an opinion piece in response to Kan changing their song to meet Eurovision requirements, heavily criticizing the decision. In it, Schiff stated that "If folding were a sport, [Kan] would get a perfect score". Schiff criticized Kan for still participating in the contest, stating that "artistic freedom" had been traded for "unavoidable political and diplomatic pressures during wartime [and] pressure from [Isaac Herzog]". He further accused Kan of attempting to build cultural credit for Israel's participation amidst the war, writing, "the illusion that we can be a small country at war that has inflicted tens of thousands of casualties, including innocent men and women, and even children who are always innocent, and still behave as if it's 1999, has exploded because they thought they could act with vigilance and not wisdom." Jerusalem Post writer Ari Sacher also expressed criticism at the changes, praising the original version of "October Rain" and stating that "what was a poignant and meaningful anthem has been reduced to another song". Nic Wolff stated that "we weren't really in real and historical danger of expulsion this time, and the whole saga about words like October and flowers seemed like a call for attention and a pathetic attempt to poke a finger in the eye of the Europeans."

==== Eurovision-related and other media ====
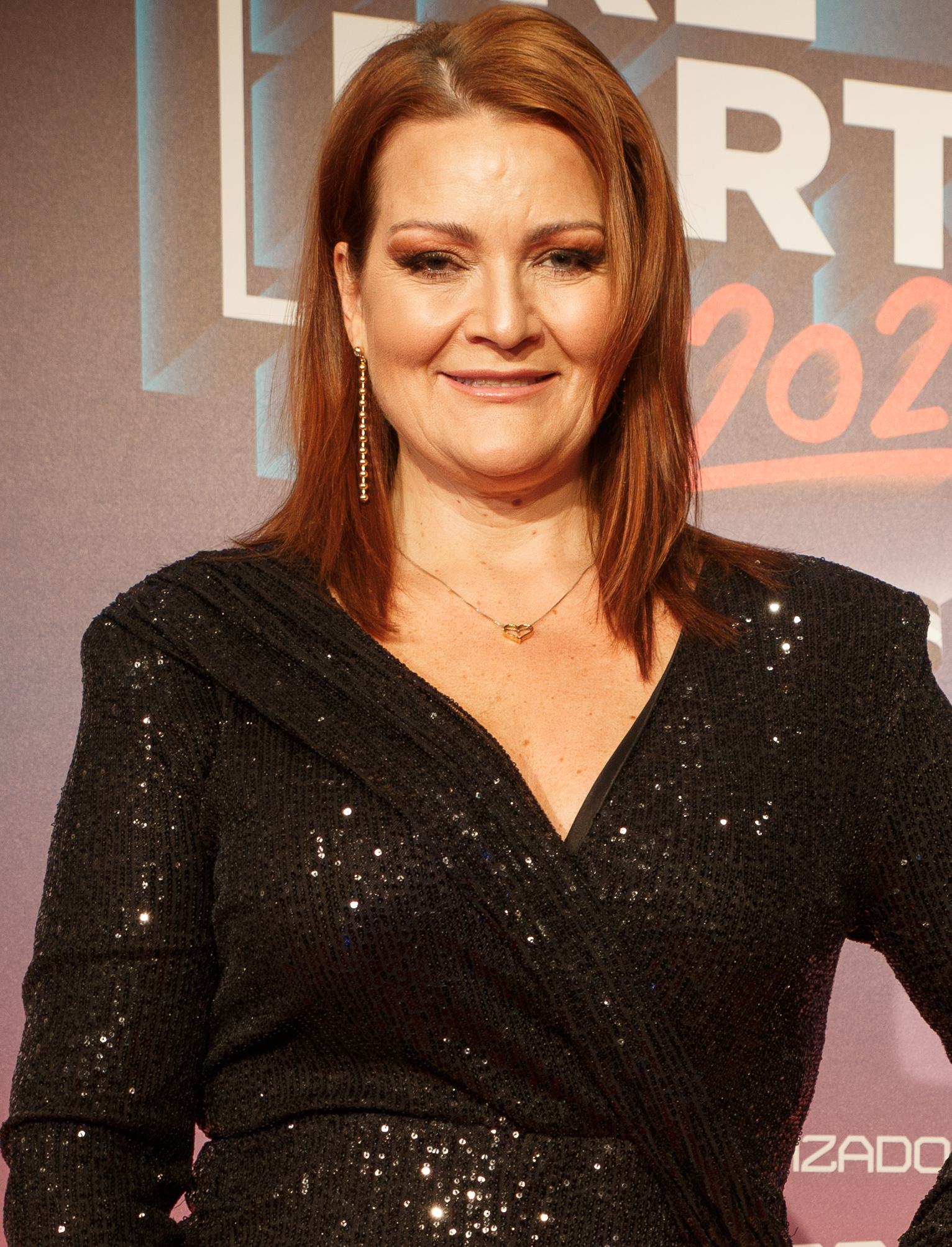
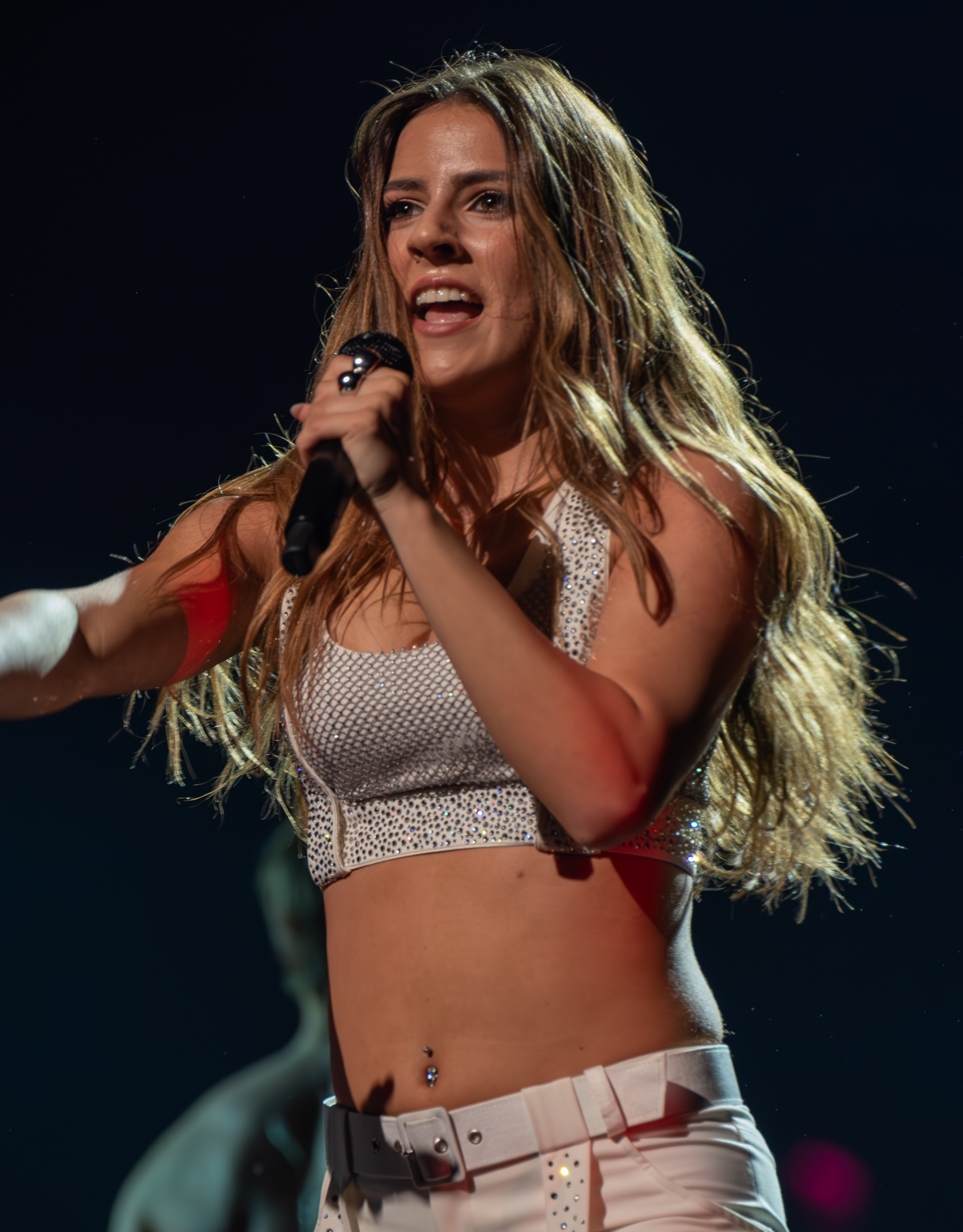
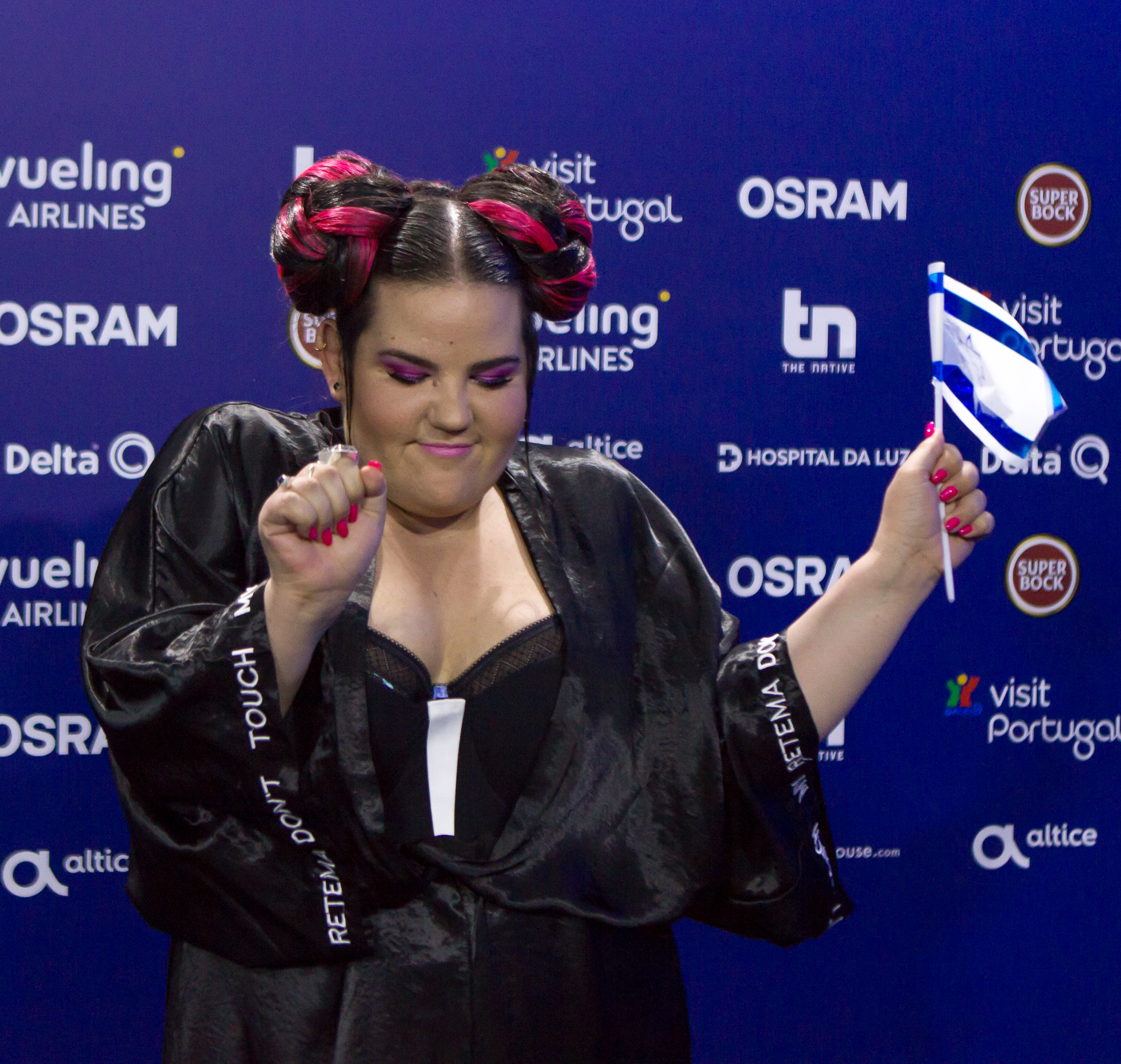
Multiple past Eurovision contestants, including 2024 representatives Hera Björk (left) and Silia Kapsis (middle) along with 2018 winner Netta Barzilai (right) sent messages of support to Golan and her song.

"Hurricane" has received positive reviews from some Eurovision contestants. Hera Björk, the Icelandic representative in 2010 and 2024, stated with Israeli Eurovision fansite EuroMix that she "love[d] the song. It's a strong song. It really is." Former Cypriot representatives, including 2023 contestant Andrew Lambrou and 2024 contestant Silia Kapsis, have both stated support for the song. Gali Atari, part of the Israeli delegation that won the contest in 1979, also praised Golan, stating that "I have unwavering confidence in her, and I trust her to represent Israel with utmost dignity... It's hard to believe she's only 20... and already she is such a diva, such a fantastic performer." Golan also received messages of support from other past Israeli Eurovision representatives, including 2018 representative Netta Barzilai and 2022 representative Michael Ben David. Shayna Weiss compared "Hurricane" to Jamala's "1944", a song about the deportation of the Crimean Tatars from Crimea in 1944 that won the Eurovision Song Contest 2016 for Ukraine. Weiss later added, "I think [Israel] tried the Ukraine route."

In a Wiwibloggs review containing several reviews from several critics, the song was rated 5.9 out of 10 points, earning 27th out of 37 songs on the site's annual ranking. Another review conducted by ESC Bubble that contained reviews from a combination of readers and juries rated the song last out of any song in the Eurovision semi-final "Hurricane" was competing against. Jon O'Brien, a writer for Vulture, ranked the song 32nd out of the 37 songs competing in that year's contest, calling the song "generic as they come, a Demi Lovato–esque power ballad that tries to say a lot but ends up saying nothing at all". In contrast, ESC Beat's Doron Lahav praised the song, ranking the song second overall out of the 37 songs competing in the contest. They gave positive remarks on Golan's vocal abilities and stated that they thought the song was "meaningful and serves as a global message". Scotsman writer Erin Adam also gave the song a favourable review, also praising Golan's vocals and rating the song seven out of 10 points.

==== Betting odds ====
Around two weeks after "Hurricane" was released, on 22 March, it was listed in eighth in overall betting odds to win the Eurovision Song Contest 2024. Within the 12 days between the song's release and the day the odds were gathered, the song had risen by two positions. After a brief fall to ninth, the song shot back up to eighth by 16 April, which The Jerusalem Post interpreted was due to the Iranian drone attacks which had occurred three days prior. Two weeks before the contest, on 27 April 2024, "Hurricane" rose to seventh. After Golan's qualification from the semi-final, she rose to second overall, only behind Croatia's Baby Lasagna, which was attributed to Italian broadcaster RAI accidentally displaying what appeared to be the televoting percentages recorded in the country, led by Israel with nearly 40% of the vote.

=== Calls for exclusion ===
Both variations of the song faced numerous unsuccessful calls for its exclusion from the Eurovision Song Contest 2024, alongside additional calls for the exclusion of Golan herself and Israel since the beginning of the Israel–Gaza war. Multiple media outlets related to Eurovision, such as Eurovoix and ESC Xtra began to limit their coverage of Israeli participation in the contest. Numerous petitions, particularly from Nordic countries, had been created to call for Israel's exclusion by February; one from Iceland managed to gain over 10,000 signatures. When "Hurricane" was leaked hours before its official release, Ynet recorded instances of Palestinian supporters calling for Israel's exclusion, along with stage protests at Eurovision if the song was permitted to compete. Opposition to calls for exclusion were also made before the contest; in February, around 400 celebrities and musicians signed a letter that supported Israel's inclusion in the contest.

== Eurovision Song Contest ==
=== HaKokhav HaBa, songwriting process ===
Israel's broadcaster for the Eurovision Song Contest, the Israeli Public Broadcasting Corporation (IPBC/Kan), utilized HaKokhav HaBa, a reality singing competition, to select their singer for the Eurovision Song Contest 2024. At the end of the competition, Eden Golan emerged victorious on 7 February 2024, winning the right to represent Israel in the contest. The songwriting process for the broadcaster's entry had started three weeks earlier, with the song being selected by an internal committee.

==== Controversies, delayed EBU approval and subsequent rewrites ====
Originally, the song was titled "October Rain" according to a 19 February report by Israel Hayom. Two days later, Ynet writer Ran Boker reported that the European Broadcasting Union (EBU), the organization that runs the Eurovision Song Contest, rejected the entry based on grounds of political content. In response, the Israeli Public Broadcasting Corporation (IPBC/Kan) initially responded by stating that it would not change the lyrics or its content, putting the song's entry into Eurovision in jeopardy. In a contrasting statement, the three songwriters later stated that while they didn't oppose changing the lyrics, they received no specific instructions on what to change. Peles later claimed that she "happily" changed the lyrics upon notice. Golan later put out a statement in response to criticism towards the song, stating that while she was "aware of what's happening [and] underst[ood] the dialogue", she also continued preparations to participate in the contest according to her acquaintances. She later admitted that she thought criticism of the song was surprising to her and that she "didn't know there was such an option".

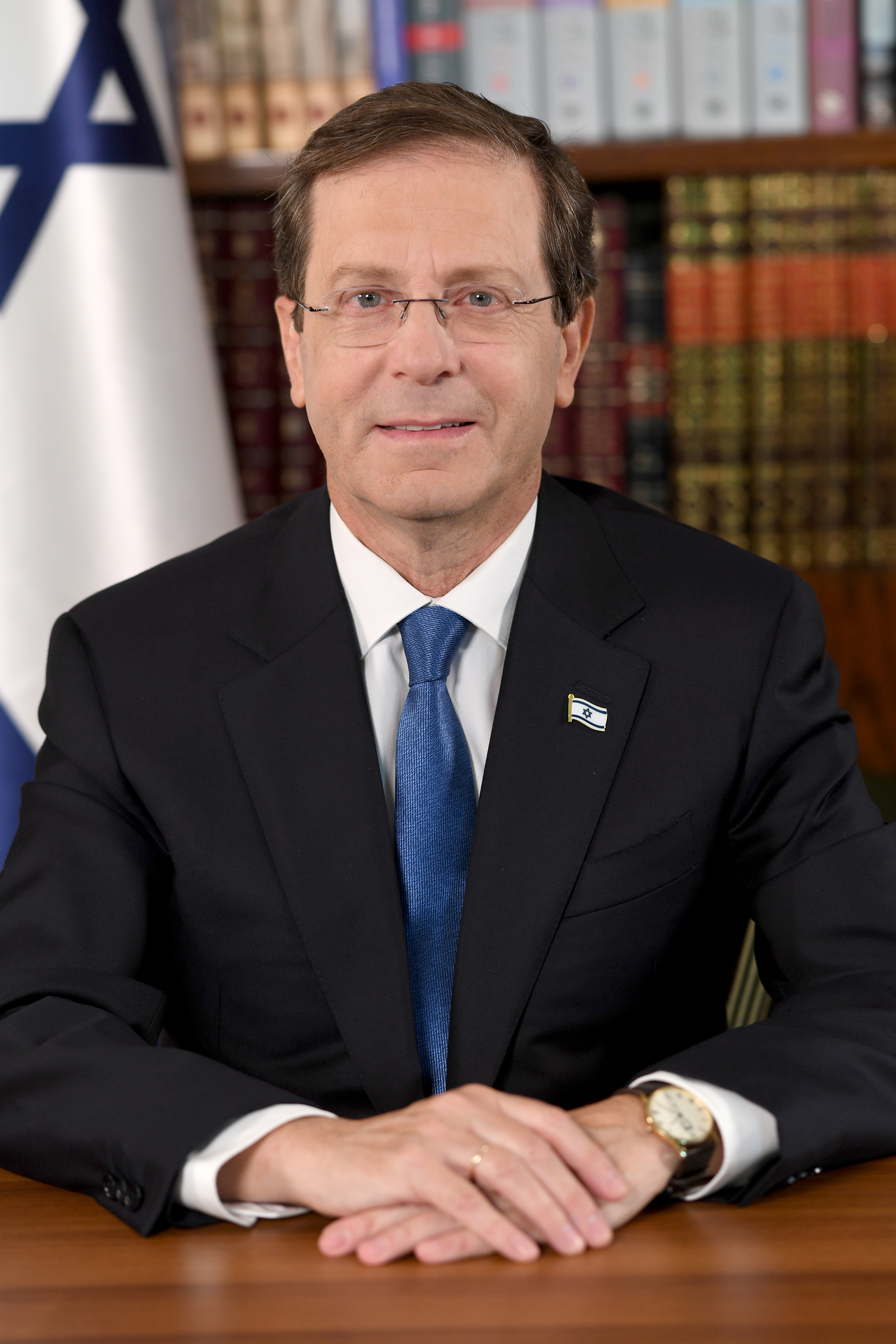
Israeli president Isaac Herzog (pictured in 2021) pressured Kan to change the song's lyrics in order to gain EBU approval.

Subsequent leaks of the lyrics of "October Rain" by Israel Hayom and Ynet described the song as a ballad that built up to a climax, alluding to "the condition of Israeli civilians" in the 7 October attacks along with the Re'im music festival massacre. After another song titled "Dance Forever" was rejected on 28 February, Kan, despite previous statements, opted to make changes to the lyrics of "October Rain" in order for the song to be eligible after Israeli president Isaac Herzog pressured Kan to make changes. The rewrite and recording of the song, now called "Hurricane", was completed on 3 March. After another rewrite requested by the EBU, the final version of "Hurricane" was sent for approval on 5 March. "Hurricane" was approved two days later.

=== At Eurovision ===
The Eurovision Song Contest 2024 took place at the Malmö Arena in Malmö, Sweden, and consisted of two semi-finals held on the respective dates of 7 and 9 May and the final on 11 May 2024. During the allocation draw on 30 January 2024, Israel was drawn to compete in the second half of the second semi-final, after Israel requested to be in that semi-final as 6 May, the rehearsal day for the first semi-final, would be Yom HaShoah, Israel's Holocaust remembrance day. Golan was later drawn to perform 14th in the semi-final, after Estonia's duo of 5miinust and Puuluup, and before Norway's Gåte.

Yoav Tzafir and Avichai Hacham were appointed to be the artistic directors for the Eurovision performance. The performance featured Golan in a white dress and five backing dancers wearing bandage-like clothing, similar to 19th-century Israeli clothing, to "express what [Israel] currently feel[s] as a nation". The five performers perform near a large circular prop with a built-in wind machine throughout the performance. The beginning of the performance features blue lighting, which then transitions over to images of a storm. The end changes the colour of the lighting to orange, which was interpreted by Israeli Eurovision fansite EuroMix as "a kind of sunrise on the set that symbolizes hope". Originally, Golan was slated to wear a yellow dress to support the cause of freeing Israeli victims from Hamas captivity; according to Alon Livne, who designed Golan's outfit, it was rejected by the EBU. Despite this, Livne claims that they "implicitly prepared elements that convey [the delegation's] feelings" regardless.

Throughout rehearsals, Golan faced loud choruses of both booing and applause during each performance, with reported chants of "Free Palestine" being heard throughout the arena. She had previously prepared for booing in the days leading up to the semi-final, with Golan performing the song occasionally while her delegation imitated a booing crowd. In spite of the booing, EBU officials stated that they wouldn't censor the crowd if the performance was booed during the semi-final. By the semi-final, however, according to Daily Telegraph writer Michael Hogan, Golan was met with a "muted reception". Despite this, the EBU's claims of anti-censorship were also challenged by The National, who reported that numerous viewers accused organisers of implementing "anti-booing technology". "Hurricane" was able to secure a position in the grand final, finishing first and receiving 194 points.

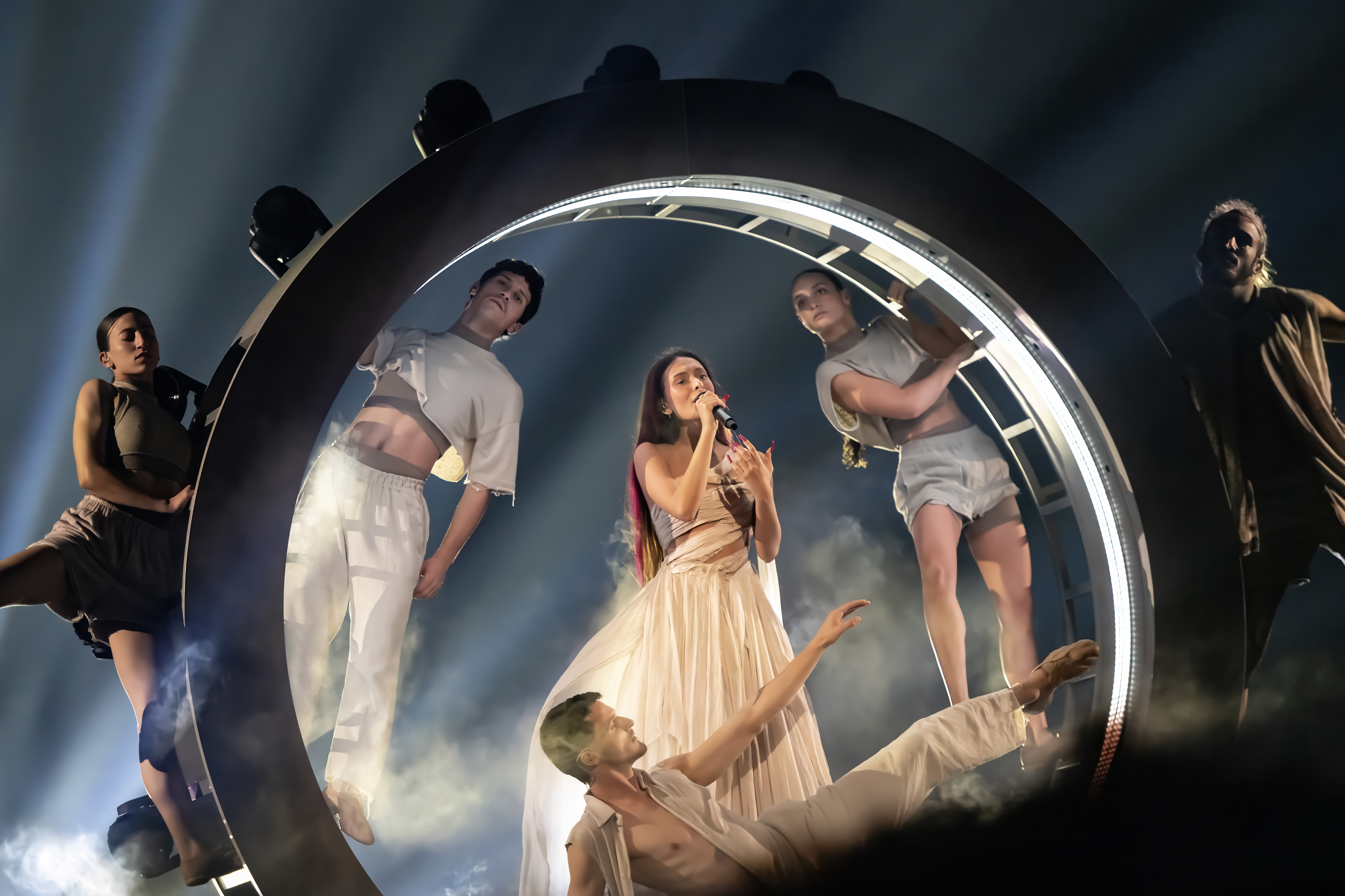
Golan at a dress rehearsal before the Eurovision 2024 final

Golan performed a repeat of her performance in the grand final on 11 May. The song was performed fifth in the final, following Luxembourg's Tali (instead of the Netherlands' Joost Klein, who was scheduled to perform before Golan but was disqualified) and before Lithuania's Silvester Belt. Golan's grand final performance was also met with a "decidedly mixed reaction" of boos and cheers according to NME writer Max Pilley. The performance was received positively by local Israeli and American Jewish media outlets. Israel Hayom's Nathan J. Minsberg declared his belief that Golan's voice was a "symbol of the indomitable spirit of Israel... Eden's story [is] a testament to the transformative power of art to lay seeds of healing in even the most unyielding soil." Brian Fishbach of the Jewish Journal wrote that despite heavy booing, he thought that Golan "galvanized Jews and music lovers around the world". Moren zer Katzenstein of The Jerusalem Post wrote their thought that the booing was directly correlated to antisemitism and was part of an "international bullying campaign".

After the results were announced, Golan finished in fifth with 375 points, with a split score of 52 jury points and 323 televoting points. Regarding the former, no country gave the song 12 points; the maximum given to the song was eight, given by Cyprus, Germany, and Norway. However, "Hurricane" received 15 sets of 12 points from televoting. In response to her result, Golan expressed contentment, stating that she was "so proud" and that she accomplished the goal of "mak[ing] Israel's strong voice heard in the world". Israeli prime minister Benjamin Netanyahu later stated in a press release statement that "they booed you and we shouted 'douze points'... You have brought immense pride to the State of Israel." Shortly after the contest, Golan appeared on an episode of the Israeli variety show Eretz Nehederet for a skit that mocked numerous contestants perceived to be pro-Palestine, including Joost Klein, Marina Satti, Bambie Thug and Nemo, the latter of whom won the competition.

== Charts ==
=== Weekly charts ===
2024 weekly chart performance
| Chart (2024) | Peak position |
|---|---|
| Australia Digital (ARIA) | 34 |
| France Digital (SNEP) | 5 |
| Greece International (IFPI) | 15 |
| Israel (Mako Hitlist) | 2 |
| Israel Airplay (Media Forest) | 1 |
| Lithuania (AGATA) | 24 |
| Netherlands (Single Tip) | 9 |
| Sweden (Sverigetopplistan) | 47 |
| Switzerland (Schweizer Hitparade) | 29 |
| UK Indie Breakers (OCC) | 11 |
| UK Singles Downloads (Official Charts) | 18 |
| UK Singles Sales (OCC) | 18 |

2025 weekly chart performance
| Chart (2025) | Peak position |
|---|---|
| Israel (Mako Hitlist) | 49 |

=== Year-end charts ===
2024 year-end chart performance
| Chart (2024) | Peak position |
|---|---|
| Israel (Mako Hitlist) | 17 |

== Release history ==
Release history and format for "Hurricane"
| Country | Date | Format(s) | Label | Ref. |
|---|---|---|---|---|
| Various | 10 March 2024 | Digital download; streaming | Session 42 | |
