= Tamar Yahalomi =

Israeli singer (born 1978)

Tamar Yahalomi תמר יהלומי
- Born: 10 July 1994 (age 32); Holon, Israel
- Genres: pop; Mizrahi
- Occupations: Singer, Songwriter
- Years active: 2011–present

Tamar Yahalomi (Hebrew: תמר יהלומי; born 10 July 1994) is an Israeli singer and songwriter.

== Biography ==
Yahalomi was born in Holon, Israel, and served in the Education and Youth Corps Choir. She first appeared in Kokhav Nolad with her hits songs "Tefilut" and "Mazel", which she produced and performed together with her partner Yonatan Kalimi. Yahami has produced songs for prominent names in the Israeli music industry, including Eden Ben Zaken, Moshe Peretz, Sarit Hadad, Omer Adam, Agam Bohbot, Itay Levy, and Osher Cohen, and she is one of the most played creators on radio stations in Israel.

== Career ==
Yahalomi began her professional career in 2011, at the age of 16 and a half, when she participated in the Keshet show "Kokhav Nolad". Ahead of the season's semi-finals, the show's production revealed that in two previous programs, the results were rigged by sending many text messages from cell phone numbers from the same groups of numbers, in favor of the contestant Yahalomi. Therefore, the production decided to allow the last three evicted ones to compete together with Yahalomi for one more ticket to the semi-finals, but Yahalomi herself preferred to withdraw from the show after her father admitted that he was behind the biasing of the results.

In December 2011, Yahalomi started a solo career and released her debut single "The Truth" (האמת).

In November 2012, she was interviewed on Network C, while talking about the future duet with Moshik Afia . On 4 November 2012, the duet was officially released, and its release was a great success. Later she released the song "Fears" (פחדים).

In addition to her singing career, Yahalomi also started a career as a songwriter, music producer, and composer.

In 2013, she released the song "The Test of Time" (מבחן הזמן). The song received positive reviews, and even managed to enter Media Forest's weekly chart.

In 2018, among others, the hits "I love you for real" (אוהבת אותי אמיתי) by Omer Adam, "Get out of my head" (תצא לי מהראש) and "Mitpalelet" (מתפללת) by Sarit Hadad, which she wrote, were released.

In 2021, she released the songs "Who am I" (מי אני) and "The best parties" (המסיבות הכי טובות).

In September 2022, together with Rami Kleinstein, she released a duet called "Somewhere in the World" (איפשהו בעולם). In the same year, together with her partner Sarit Hadad, she released a joint performance from a concert in Caesarea for the songs "Mazel" (מזל) and "Love Like Ours" (אהבה כמו שלנו), with this music video they both came out of the closet in public.

On 16 May 2023, she released the single "Tefilot" (תפילות) which reached the 73rd place on the Mako Hit List.

In November 2023, during the Gaza war, the song "We are destiny" (אנחנו זה גורל) was published, which she wrote and composed together with Yonatan Kalimi and was performed by her partner, the singer Sarit Hadad, and the singer Eden Hason.

At the same time as her solo career, together with her partner in writing and composing songs, Yonatan Kalimi, she released the song "Cellphones" (פלאפונים) with the guest singer Rotem Chen, the song "Come back to you" (לשוב אליך), and the song "Mazel" (מזל) which became a hit and gained over 16 million views.

== Awards ==
- 2023 – ACUM - Author of the Year Award

== Personal life ==
In September 2021, Yahalomi came out and revealed that she is in a relationship with the singer Sarit Hadad. They have a daughter together born to Yahalomi, in addition to Hadad's two daughters. They separated in June of 2025.

== Discography ==
| Year | Artist | Title | Album |
|---|---|---|---|
| 2014 | Moshik Afia | "עד שתחזרי" | —N/a |
| 2014 | Meir Alfi | "מי אם לא אני" | מי אם לא אני |
| 2015 | Meir Alfi | "דמותך" | מי אם לא אני |
| 2015 | Meir Alfi | "תאילנד" | מי אם לא אני |
| 2015 | Moshe Trabelsi | "שתיים ועשרים" | —N/a |
| 2016 | Yaniv Ben Mashiach | "אורות הלב" | —N/a |
| 2016 | Eyal Golan | "כדי שאלך" | רחוק מכאן |
| 2016 | Sarit Hadad | "מתפללת" | שרה שרה |
| 2016 | Yoav Yizchak | "נשארת לעולם" | —N/a |
| 2016 | Eden Ben Zaken | "אין לי אותך" | תאמין לי |
| 2017 | Maor Edri | "אותה מנגינה" | בא לי טוב |
| 2017 | Nofar Salman | "איך הוא בא אליי" | —N/a |
| 2017 | Avior Malasa | "גיבור" | אביאור מלסה |
| 2017 | Moshe Peretz | "דהו האותיות" | בחור חדש |
| 2017 | Eliad Nachum | "זמן" | תמיד חלמתי |
| 2017 | Eyal Golan | "לא פשוט להיות פשוט" | לא פשוט להיות פשוט |
| 2017 | Agam Buhbut | "חוזרת אליך" | —N/a |
| 2018 | Omer Adam | "אוהבת אותי אמיתי" | Omer |
| 2018 | Omer Adam | "רחוק מכולם" | Omer |
| 2018 | Dudu Aharon | "הלב שלי על מאתיים" | השמחה שלנו |
| 2018 | Eran Carmi | "זכרונות על השולחן" | —N/a |
| 2018 | Agam Buhbut | "חיכיתי" | —N/a |
| 2018 | Moti Taka | "ככה לא עוזבים" | —N/a |
| 2018 | Tzahi Koren | "מאז שהלכת לי" | —N/a |
| 2018 | Gal Adam | "לקחת איתך הכל" | —N/a |
| 2018 | Yam Refaeli | "מילים שהייתי אומר רק לך" | —N/a |
| 2018 | Sarit Hadad | "תצא לי מהראש" | —N/a |
| 2018 | Itay Levy | "אחרי הכל מתגעגע" | שתישרף האהבה |
| 2018 | Itay Levy | "כמעט שנתיים" | שתישרף האהבה |
| 2018 | Eden Ben Zaken | "חיים שלי" | חיים שלי |
| 2019 | Sarit Hadad | "אולי עוד קצת ביחד" | —N/a |
| 2019 | Eti Bitton | "לא מה שחלמנו" | —N/a |
| 2019 | Agam Buhbut | "סופות" | —N/a |
| 2019 | Hagar Yefet | "לא נגמר" | —N/a |
| 2019 | Hagar Yefet | "זה אתה" | —N/a |
| 2019 | Eden Ben Zaken | "איך אתה יודע" | חיים שלי |
| 2019 | Tamar Yahalomi & Yonatan Kalimi | "פלאפונים" | —N/a |
| 2020 | Sarit Hadad | "תגיד שאתה כאן" | —N/a |
| 2020 | Omer Adam | "שלום לך" | Omer |
| 2020 | The Idan Raichel Project & Nasrin Kadri | "איזה יום טוב" | —N/a |
| 2020 | Osher Cohen | "חיכיתי לך" | חיכיתי לך |
| 2020 | Tal Versano | "מדברים על אהבה" | —N/a |
| 2020 | Agam Buhbut & Gal Adam | "עברו חודשיים" | —N/a |
| 2020 | Eyal Golan | "מכאן ועד הנצח" | מכאן ועד הנצח |
| 2020 | Eden Ben Zaken | "כשתבוא" | מועבט |
| 2020 | Gal Adam | "איתך עושה לי טוב" | —N/a |
| 2020 | Itay Levy | "אם העולם יגמר" | —N/a |
| 2020 | Itay Levy | "בסוף תמיד חוזר" | —N/a |
| 2020 | Omer Adam | "הנשיקות שלי" | —N/a |
| 2020 | Sarit Hadad | "כשהכל יגמר" | —N/a |
| 2020 | Festigal (Hebrew: פסטיגל) | "יש בך" | —N/a |
| 2021 | Noy Fadlon | "הרסת לי שירים" | —N/a |
| 2021 | Yonatan Kalimi | "הזמן ייקח הכל" | —N/a |
| 2021 | Eti Bitton | "הלב שלי נקי" | —N/a |
| 2021 | Yonatan Kalimi | "מיליון שירים" | —N/a |
| 2021 | Nasrin Kadri | "תסמעני" | —N/a |
| 2021 | Roee Sendler | "אהובתי" | —N/a |
| 2021 | Sarit Hadad | "אהבה כמו שלנו" | —N/a |
| 2021 | Omer Adam | "חורף באוטו" | —N/a |
| 2021 | Tamar Yahalomi | "המסיבות הכי טובות" | —N/a |
| 2021 | Sarit Hadad | "מי תאהב" | —N/a |
| 2021 | Idan Raichel | "אבן על אבן (רגע של אושר)" | —N/a |
| 2021 | Eden Ben Zaken & Eden Hason | "פילטרים יפים" | עם או בלי לאהוב |
| 2021 | Nasrin Kadri | "מאושרים" | —N/a |
| 2021 | Maya Bouskilla | "ממך וממני" | —N/a |
| 2021 | Yonatan Kalimi | "סימני פרידה" | —N/a |
| 2021 | Itay Levy | "אני כבר לא בך" | —N/a |
| 2022 | Eyal Golan | "סוף של כל סיפור" | קצת שמח קצת עצוב |
| 2022 | Moshiko Mor | "אם אין אותך" | —N/a |
| 2022 | Tamar Yahalomi | "תפילי עליי געגוע" | —N/a |
| 2022 | Yonatan Kalimi | "אני פה" | —N/a |
| 2022 | Mor Reveii & Avi Aburomi | "חצי שלי" | —N/a |
| 2022 | Dekel Vaknin | "מה זה לאהוב" | —N/a |
| 2022 | Tamar Yahalomi & Yonatan Kalimi | "מזל" | —N/a |
| 2022 | Sarit Hadad | "חוף מבטחים" | —N/a |
| 2022 | Zehava Ben | "אף פעם לא תדע" | —N/a |
| 2022 | The Idan Raichel Project & Margalit Tzan'ani | "על הספסל שבשכונה" | —N/a |
| 2022 | Eden Ben Zaken | "ניסיתי" | עם או בלי לאהוב |
| 2022 | Rami Kleinstein & Tamar Yahalomi | "איפשהו בעולם" | |
| 2023 | Tamar Yahalomi & Yonatan Kalimi | "לשוב אליך" | |
| 2023 | Tamar Yahalomi | "תפילות" | |
| 2024 | Tamar Yahalomi | "ככה בלי לדבר" | |
| 2024 | Tamar Yahalomi | "מצלק אותי" | |
