= Odeya =

Israeli musical artist

Odeya אודיה
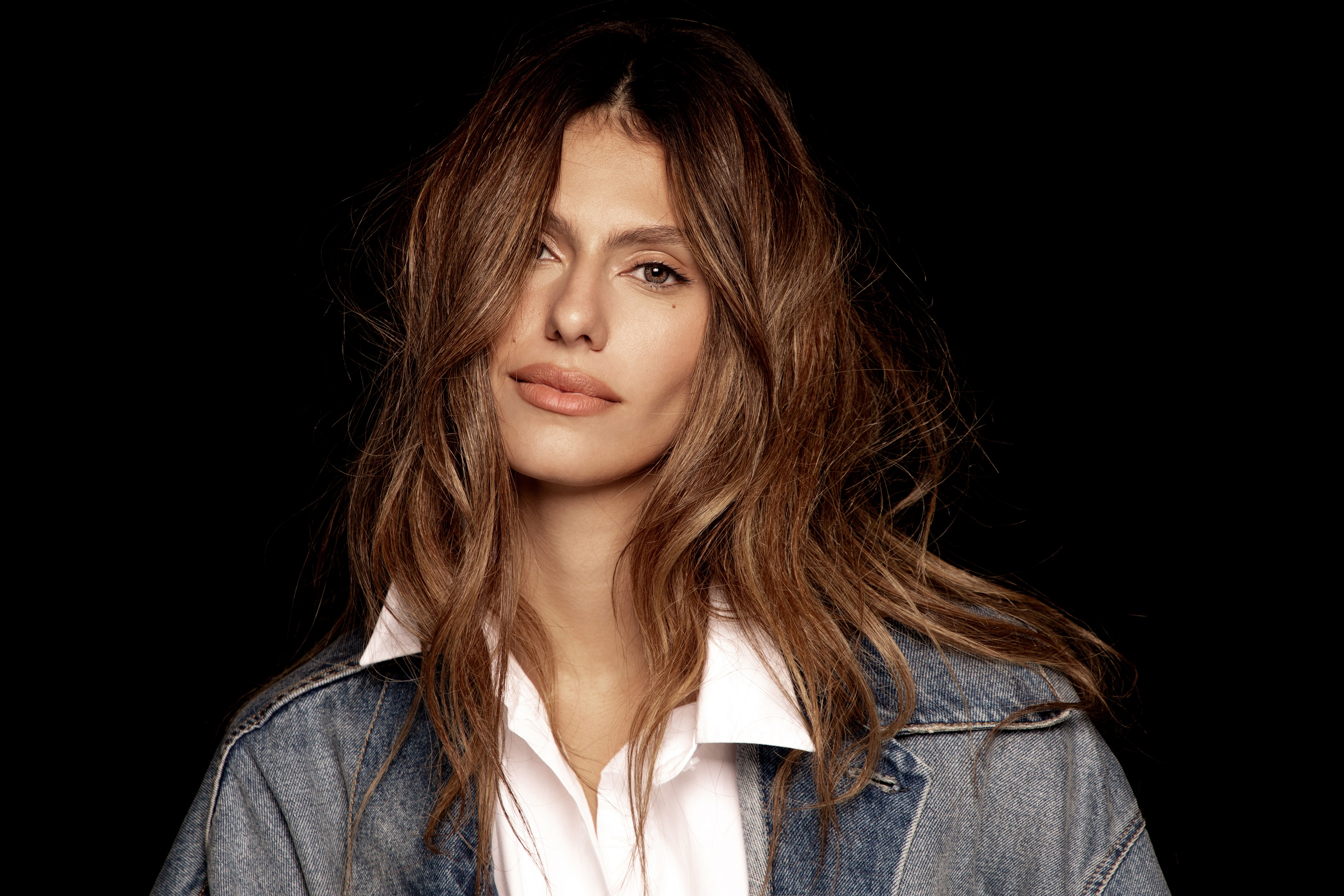

Background information
- Born: אודיה אזולאי; 19 April 2001 (age 25); Israel
- Genre: Pop
- Occupations: Singer-songwriter; composer
- Instruments: Piano; guitar
- Label: Aroma Music

Odeya Azulay known as Odeya (Hebrew: אוֹדֶיָּה אזולאי; born 19 April 2001) is an Israeli singer-songwriter and composer.

== Early life ==
Odeya Azulay was born and raised in Bat Yam to a family of Moroccan origin in a religious home and attended a religious school. Around the age of 11, she distanced herself from religion and transferred to a secular school. After a few years, she began to approach religion again. In an interview with the website Frogi, she said: "I know there is an interest in women's singing, but I have a rabbi who I go to and he strengthens me a lot". She later added that "since my return to religion, I have been writing about slightly deeper topics; about Judaism, the soul, about the Creator of the world". In an interview with Ma'ariv La'noar, she said that she auditioned for the Music School TV Show. In October 2019, she enlisted in the Israel Defense Forces.

== Career ==
Before releasing her debut single, she recorded a cover version of Lana Del Rey's "Young and Beautiful".

On 18 November 2019, her debut single, "HaAhava Shelanu" (Our Love) was released, which was a success, garnering over half a million views on YouTube. The song was written by Odeya and produced by Guy and Yahel. In light of its success, in January 2020 she released her second single, "Rak Shayishaer", which she co-wrote with producers Guy and Yael.

In March 2020, her breakthrough single "Or" was released, which achieved great success on the official Galgalatz chart, staying there for many weeks and peaking at number six. On 8 July of that year, its official acoustic version was released. In mid-2020, she released the single "Ma Ashiv Lach", and towards the end of September, she released an official remix of "Or". It accumulated over 5 million views on YouTube, took first place on Spotify's viral chart in Israel, and was at the top of the Apple Music chart. In early 2021, she remixed "Habaita Lahzor" (Coming Back Home) written by Yoram Taharlev, and released an accompanying music video for the song. She also wrote and composed the song "Ein Oti Yoter" by singer Gal Adam, participated in the music video, recorded the opening line of the song, and sang a line from the song towards the end.

On 20 June 2021, her debut album, "Or", was released. On the same day, she released the eighth single from it, "Natznatzim", which also had an accompanying music video. Later that year, she released "Bati Lehatzil Otach" (I Came To Save You) for Agam Buchbוt with Moshe Ben Avraham and Shahar Saul. She also wrote the song "Ma Kara?" for Eden Ben Zaken.

In 2023, she wrote the songs "Ani" and "Yatz'a Shabbat" for Omer Adam, which appear on his seventh album, "Sof Ha'olam". On 5 January, she released the single "Baleylot" with Offer Nissim. On 5 February, she released the cover version of "I Wanna Be Yours" with Red Band. On 12 March, she released the single "Rak Otcha Ahavti". On 15 March, she released the single "Hozer Al Atzmo". On 23 March, she released the cover version of the song "Tzipor Midbar" as part of an advertising campaign for the Castro clothing company. On 26 March, she released the song "Psychologit" (Psychologist). On 30 March 2023, she released her second studio album, "HaEmet". On 13 June, she released the singles "Intelectu-arsit" and "HaZug HaMalchuti (The Royal Couple). On 2 August, she released the single "Satai / Ata Sheli (Part 1)". In September, Odeya, along with Narkis Reuven-Nagar, Eden Ben Zaken, and Nasrin Kadri released the project "Women's Singing" with the single "Tehamer Alai"; The single reached number four on the Media Forest weekly chart.

In October, she released "Winter 23" with E-Z, in the shadow of the Gaza war. On 16 November 2023, she released the mini-album "Iron Swords" which includes three songs inspired by the Iron Swords War (Gaza War).

On 22 January 2024, Odeya and Sasson Ifram and Shaulav collaborated on a love song called "HaDam Sheli" (My Blood). That same month, she released the singles "Im Ata Sheli" (If You Are Mine) and "Politica" (Politics).

In April 2024, she was named on Israel's Forbes 30 Under 30. On 16 April, she released the song "Tzamud Tzamud" with Shrek and Omer Adam. On 2 June, she released the single "BaGilgul HaBa" (In the Next Incarnation). On 8 September, she released her third studio album, "Yalda Shel Emuna". The album includes 13 songs, three of which were released in the weeks leading up to the album's release: "Ovad BaKfar", "Layla Tov", and "Ben Adam". Odeya wrote most of the album's songs in a villa in northern Israel, which she rented to be alone and work. The album was created in collaboration with several writers and producers, including Tamir Tzur, Ofir Cohen, Tal Ben Nun, and Jordan Peleg. On 14 November, she released the single "At Lo Yoda'at Cama SheAni Ohev Otach" (You Don't Know How Much I Love You). On 24 November, she released the single "Mi Ohev Otach Yoter MiMeni", a cover version of a song by Arkadi Duchin.

On 4 March 2025, she released her second mini-album, "Kol HaLehanim Nigmeru", which includes six songs.

On 25 March, she collaborated with the duo Ness ve Stilla to create the song "Shopping List". On 29 June, she released the song Papi, initially using a cover that consisted of a photo of herself pasted on top of a verbatim copy of Bad Bunny’s DtMf album's cover. A few months later, the cover created controversy on Latin American social media, with some accusing Odeya of "cultural appropriation". Papi was briefly taken down by Spotify after a complaint from Bad Bunny's legal team, then re-uploaded a few days later with new cover art.

Odeya also released her song "Alice" on 29 June, followed by a collaboration with Sarit Hadad, released on 4 August. In September, she performed a few songs with Itay Tuna.

On 5 October, Odeya released her next EP, "Van Da'm". Alongside the title track were "Rocky", which went viral on social media before the full song was even released, and "Hakol Hakol Letova", which features a verse of ancient Hebrew prayers.

Odeya was ranked singer of the year for 2025 on "Radio Darom" and "Israel Hayom".

== Discography ==
=== Studio albums ===
- 2021: Or - אור (Light)
- 2023: HaEmet - האמת (The Truth)
- 2024: Yalda Shel Emuna - ילדה של אמונה (Child of Faith)

=== Mini Albums ===
- 2023: Haravot Barzel - חרבות ברזל (Iron Swords)
- 2025: Kol HaLehanim Nigmeru - כל הלחנים נגמרו (All the melodies are over)

== Awards ==
Year	Award	Category	Outcome
2022	Frogi Annual Choice Year Awards	Singer of the year	Nominated
2023	Composer's Association Award	Discovery of the year	Won
2024	Israeli Artists' Association	Young and Pioneering award	Won
