= Part of Eternity =

Part of Eternity (חלק מהנצח)

Studio album by Omer Adam
- Released: February 19, 2026
- Length: 54:13
- Label: P.A.I LTD
- Producers: Gal Adam; Moshe Ben Avraham; Netanel Sasson; Nuriel Yashar; Ofek Yekutiel; Raz Copperman; Zizi Trippo

Part of Eternity (Hebrew: חלק מהנצח) is the tenth studio album by Israeli musician Omer Adam, released as a surprise at midnight on February 19, 2026 (he advanced the planned morning drop due to fan demand). It runs about 54 minutes across 17 tracks (15 main + 2 bonus) and blends Mediterranean/Israeli pop with polished international production that incorporates classical, operatic, ethnic, and Latin (including samba) elements.

== Background ==
The album was largely created during an intensive “recording camp” in November 2025 at a complex with five professional studios near Toulouse, France—the first time Adam had done an extended overseas camp. Key collaborators included artistic advisor/writer/composer Tal Castiel, French producer/composer Nazim Khaled (known for work with major French pop artists), Israeli producer Eden Atad, and Adam’s brother Gal Adam (who co-wrote, co-composed, and co-produced tracks and appears on the album). Other contributors include writers and producers such as Raz Kuperman, Nouriel Yeshar, Aviv Peretz, Dror Mizrachi, and others.

Adam has described the project as a “puzzle of my life” that touches on everything that makes him up, with some tracks nodding back to his early roots (around 2009). The album arrived less than a year after his previous release, תסמינים של פרידה (Symptoms of Separation).

== Composition ==
Part of Eternity (חלק מהנצח) is a mature, personal, and emotionally intensive record centered on heartbreak, separation, loneliness, and rebuilding identity after a high-profile breakup (widely linked to his split from Yael Shelbia). Lyrics include biographical allusions—such as a roughly two-year relationship, returning to living alone in the city, and unfulfilled wedding plans in Greece.

Alongside the wounded-lover persona (successful outwardly but broken inside, oscillating between ego, vulnerability, jealousy, and fear of abandonment), the album explores aging and identity at 32, the tension between material success and inner values/morality/family honor, and a spiritual/faith dimension. Standout reflective or faith-oriented moments include the prayer-like “אבא, אבא, אבא” (Father, Father, Father), which mixes personal confession with longing for divine connection (“talking to God with coffee and Psalms”).

== Critical reception ==
Critical reception to Omer Adam’s חלק מהנצח (Part of Eternity, released February 19, 2026) was positive & mixed. Reviewers generally praised his powerful voice and the polished, international-sounding production (which mixes Mediterranean pop with classical, operatic, ethnic, and Latin touches), but some criticized the album’s length (17 tracks), formulaic qualities, emotional repetition, lack of editing/selectivity, and sense of industrial output rather than artistic risk.

Yosmusic rated it 3.5/5. He characterized it as a polished, brand-reinforcing album rather than an experimental one: rich string ballads, big choruses, and performance-ready tracks, but no dramatic sonic shift. He noted emotional maturity and a more tired/adult take on the “wounded successful man” persona compared with earlier dramatic heartbreak songs, while pointing out recurring formulas and romantic clichés.

Dudi Patimer of Israeli newspaper Maariv gave it a positive reception. He viewed it as a cohesive work that shows personal and artistic maturation, with well-executed production that smoothly blends classical/operatic elements with modern pop, ethnic, and Mediterranean flavors. He appreciated the range of themes (faith, heartbreak, aging, identity) and moments of emotional honesty.

Assaf Nevo of Walla Called the album overloaded. Noting Adam’s rapid output (his fourth album in roughly about 2½ years, with a handful of new songs in that period), Nevo wrote that an external producer with critical judgment would have cut at least a third of the tracks. He praised mid-album highlights such as the upbeat brothers’ collaboration “לילות יפים” (Beautiful Nights) and “שירתו של החורף” (His Winter Song), but criticized Adam’s tendency to over-sing/shout on quieter ballads. He ended by doubting whether the songs would truly become “part of eternity.”

== Track listing ==
Part of Eternity (חלק מהנצח)
No.	Title	Writer(s)	Producer(s)	Length
1.	"משפחה וכבוד"	Aviv Peretz; Dror Mizrachi; Zizi Trippo; Raz Copperman; Yehonatan Ben Simon	Zizi Trippo; Raz Copperman	3:01
2.	"פלאזה אתנה"	Tal Castiel	Nuriel Yashar	2:32
3.	"אלבי"	Tal Castiel	Netanel Sasson	3:35
4.	"אורות כחולים"	Tal Castiel; Zizi Trippo; Raz Copperman	Zizi Trippo; Raz Copperman	3:32
5.	"יש יותר מדי שירים היום"	Tal Castiel	Zizi Trippo; Raz Copperman	3:02
6.	"לילות יפים"	Tal Castiel; ShrekDiMC; Nuriel Yashar	Nuriel Yashar	2:44
7.	"שירתו של החורף"	Omer Adam; Tal Castiel; Gal Adam	Gal Adam; Netanel Sasson	3:21
8.	"פינה של שקט"	Tal Castiel	Zizi Trippo; Raz Copperman	3:38
9.	"מישהו שמזכיר אותי"	Tal Castiel; Zizi Trippo	Zizi Trippo; Netanel Sasson; Raz Copperman	2:23
10.	"ריו דה ז׳נרו"	Tal Castiel	Nuriel Yashar	3:23
11.	"בן 32"	Tal Castiel	Zizi Trippo; Raz Copperman	3:30
12.	"מאפיה"	Tal Castiel; Zizi Trippo	Zizi Trippo; Raz Copperman	3:07
13.	"הסוף הזה"	Aviv Peretz; Dror Mizrachi; Zizi Trippo; Raz Copperman	Zizi Trippo; Raz Copperman	2:56
14.	"תקופה חרא"	Tal Castiel; Zizi Trippo	Zizi Trippo; Raz Copperman	4:03
15.	"אבא, אבא, אבא"	Tal Castiel	Guy Dan	2:44
16.	"להינשא הלילה"	Rami Lev	Moshe Ben Avraham; Ofek Yekutiel	4:05
17.	"להשתטות"	Haim Hazak; Lavi Medina	Netanel Sasson	2:29
