= Static & Ben El Tavori =

Israeli pop duo (2015–2022)

Static & Ben El Tavori סטטיק ובן אל תבורי
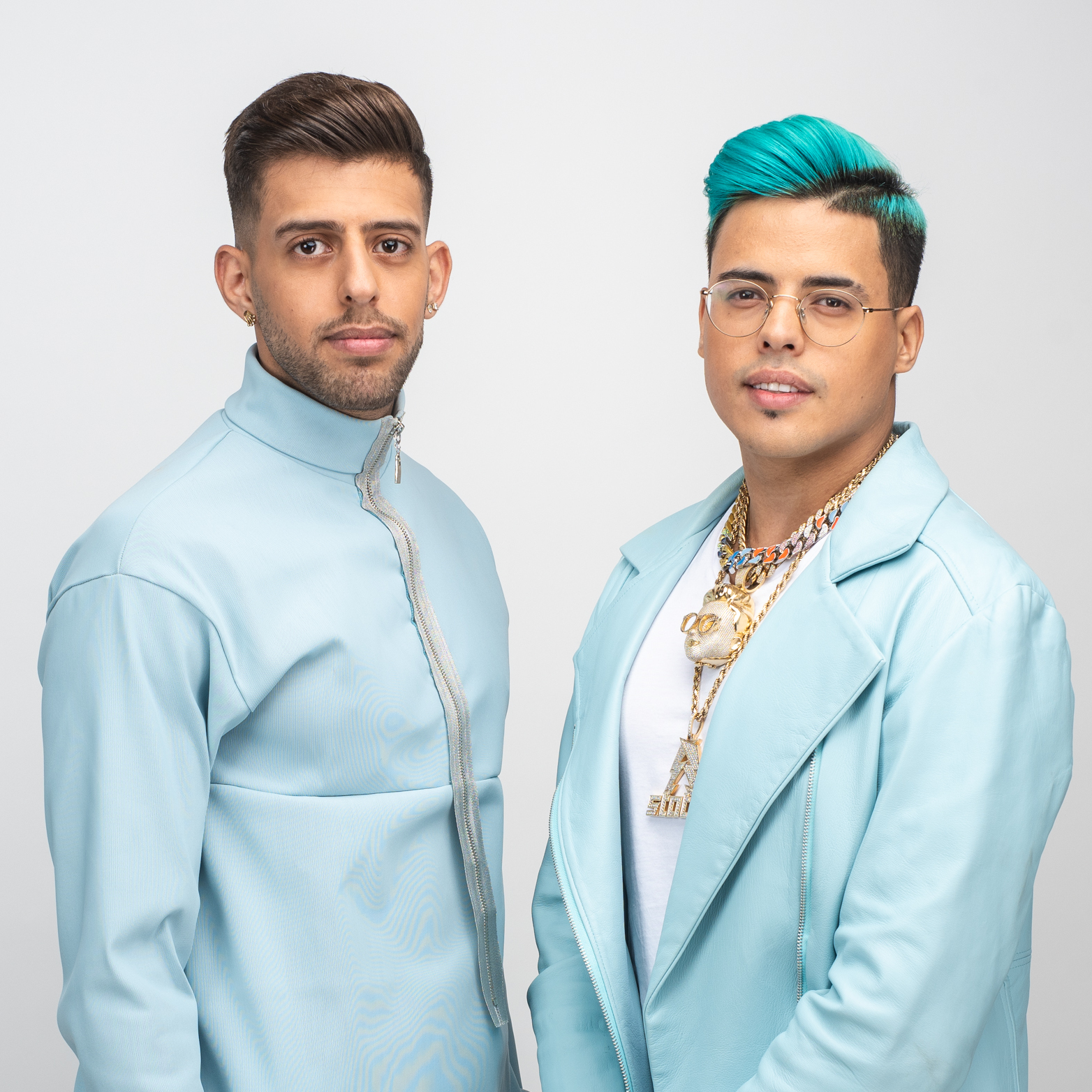
- Static (right) and Ben El Tavori, 2020

Background information
- Origin: Israel
- Genres: Pop; Mizrahi music; hip hop
- Years active: 2015–2022
- Past members: Static (Liraz Russo); Ben-El Tavori; Jordi (Yarden Peleg) (producer)

Static & Ben El Tavori (Hebrew: סטטיק ובן אל תבורי), also known as Static & Ben El, were an Israeli pop duo made up of the singers Liraz Russo, known as Static, and Ben El Tavori, with producer Yarden Peleg, known as Jordi. Formed in 2015, the duo had a string of number-one hits in Israel, including "Tudo Bom" (2017), and in 2018 signed a ten-year deal with Capitol Records. Their English-language singles included collaborations with Pitbull, the Black Eyed Peas and Snoop Dogg. The duo announced their split on August 25, 2022.

== Biography ==
=== Static ===
Liraz Russo (Hebrew: לירז רוסו; born 8 December 1990), best known as Static (סטטיק) was adopted by an affluent Israeli couple, Moshe and Nitza Russo, at the age of four months, and he was raised Jewish in Haifa, Israel. He does not know his country of birth — although he has mentioned that it is possible he was born in Latin America, more precisely Argentina. He began learning to play the piano at age three, and later switched to guitar. At age 15, he performed in municipal festivals with a Haifa youth band. He did his mandatory military service in the Israel Defense Forces as an officer in the Israeli Air Force, but was discharged early and did not complete full military service for health reasons. After being discharged, he began working with music producer Omri Segal, which opened doors for him in the music industry. He adopted the stage name "Static", a nickname that had been given to him by a childhood friend. His breakthrough came in 2015, when together with DJ Gal Malka, he released the song "Ba La Lirkod", which entered the Galgalatz playlist and became one of the most successful Israeli songs of the year.

In 2021, Russo married his longtime girlfriend, Sarit Polak; the couple divorced in November 2022. In a 2026 interview, Russo said that he does not perform or work on Shabbat, puts on tefillin, observes kashrut, and recites blessings before eating.

=== Ben El Tavori ===
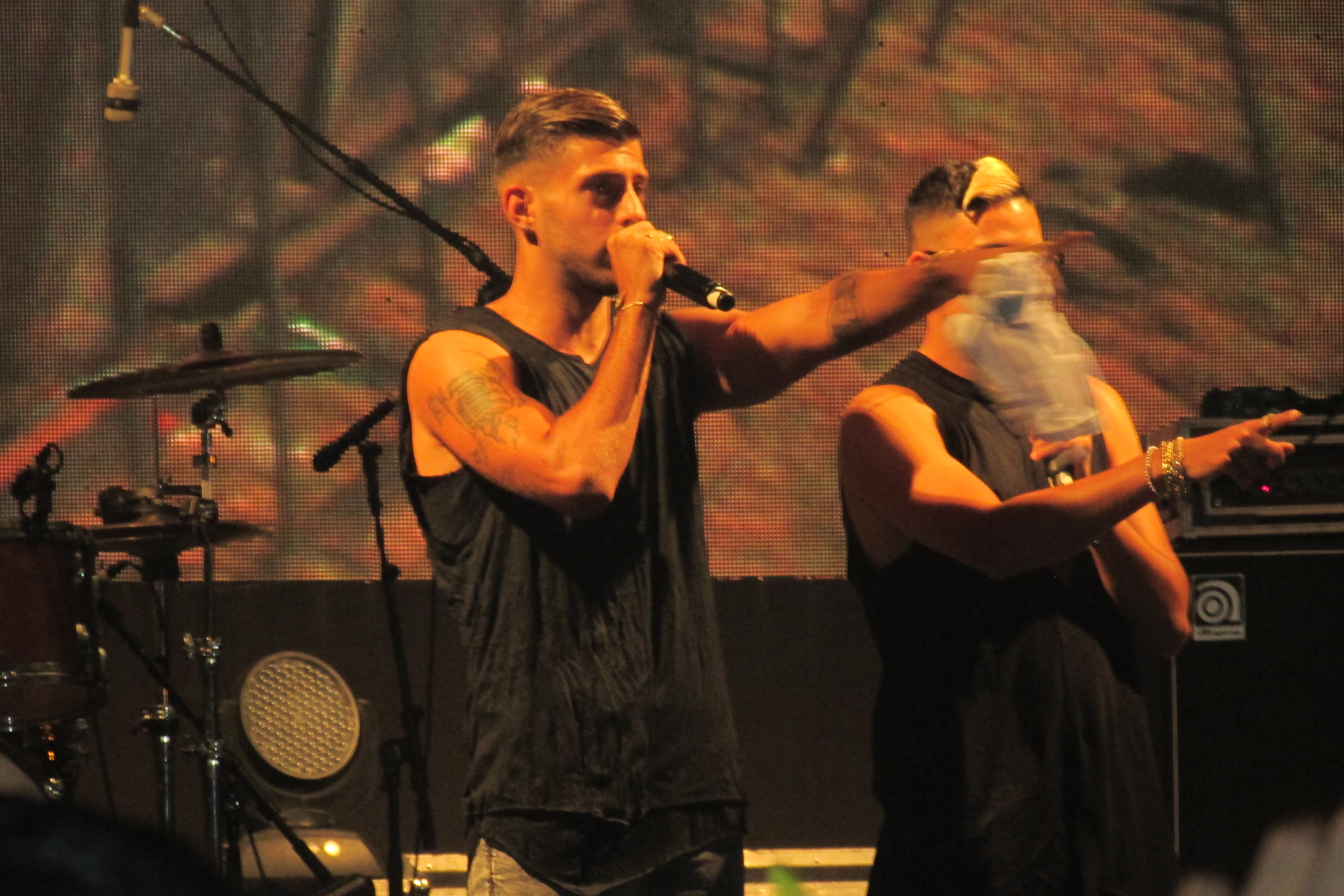
Ben El Tavori

Ben El Tavori (Hebrew: בן-אל תבורי; born 22 December 1991) is the son of Israeli singer Shimi Tavori and Aviva (née Azulay). Their family is of Mizrahi Jewish (Yemenite-Jewish and Moroccan-Jewish) descent. When he was a child, his parents divorced. In 2005, at age 14, he sang publicly for the first time with his father. In 2007, at age 16, he auditioned for the seventh season of Kokhav Nolad together with his brother Daniel, but only his brother was accepted. He did his mandatory military service in the Israeli Air Force. In March 2011, he released his debut album. His cooperation with Russo and Peleg on the Ron Nesher song "#DubiGal" is considered his breakthrough.

=== Jordi ===
Yarden Peleg (Hebrew: ירדן פלג; born 20 January 1987), best known as Jordi (ג'ורדי), was born in Kiryat Motzkin, Israel. His family is Jewish and his parents are Tzvi and Malka Peleg. Peleg's father was a radio broadcaster, and as a child, he visited his father many times at the radio station where he worked. At age 12 he began making music, and at 17, he dropped out of high school and produced his first song. At age 18, he built a recording studio in his home. In 2013, he opened a studio and began working as an independent producer. He worked with various artists, and first met Static while working on a song by the band KYD which also featured Alon De Loco and Static.

== Musical collaboration ==
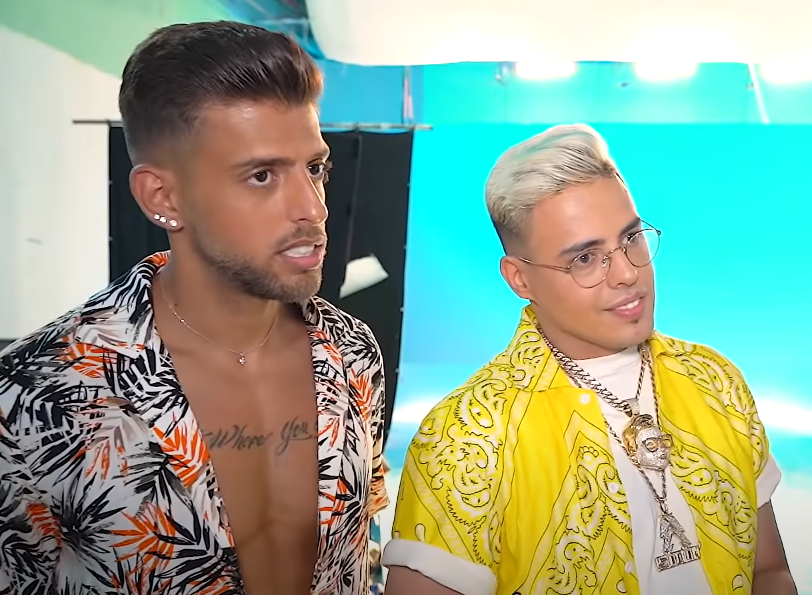
Static (right) & Ben El Tavori (left) in 2020

Static, Tavori, and Jordi cooperated in rapper Ron Nesher's 2015 single "#DubiGal". From then on, Static and Tavori began recording songs together, and Jordi produced their music. Each of the duo's singles was accompanied by a music video, many of which received tens of millions of views on YouTube. Their first single "Barbie" was released in November 2015, was a success and entered the Galgalatz playlist, becoming Static's second song and Tavori's first to do so. Three months later they released their second single "Kvish Hachof", about the two's many trips on Israel's coastal road, since Static is from Haifa and Ben El is from Tel Aviv.

Their third song "Silsulim", which came out in June 2016, won the 'Song of the Year' award on Reshet Gimmel's Annual Hebrew song chart for the year 5776. In the Galgalatz chart that year, they won 'Breakthrough of the Year' and 'People of the Year'. In September 2016, they released the song "Stam". Their fifth single "Zahav", together with a 1950s-themed music video, came out in January 2017.

From the show's fourth season, Static and Ben El were judges on the reality show HaKokhav HaBa, and they later also judged the Israeli version of The Masked Singer.

In 2017, Static, Tavori and Jordi won the ACUM 'Achievement of the Year' prize, named for Inbal Perlmutter. That year they also participated in the Festigal, and appeared in an advertising campaign by the fashion company Castro.

In June 2017, they released the Brazilian-themed song "Tudo Bom" which contains a few words in Portuguese. This song became widely popular in Israel and also drew significant attention from Brazil. The pair were invited to visit the Brazilian Embassy and meet the Brazilian Ambassador to Israel. The song broke the record for the highest number of views of an Israeli song on YouTube in one day.

A later single, "Hakol Letova", was released in October 2017. The song broke the record for number of plays of an Israeli song on the radio in one day, with 80, exceeding the previous record of 66, also held by Static and Ben El, with the song Tudo Bom.

In 2018, they released five songs, among them the Japan-themed song "Kawaii" as well as their first English song, "Broke Ass Millionaire", set to the tune of "Silsulim". In March 2018, they signed a ten-year, $5 million deal with Capitol Records, brokered by Haim Saban, to produce seven international albums in English. They worked with songwriter Emily Wright. However, Israel remained the main focus of their activity. Four more songs were released in 2019, including an English version of Tudo Bom made in collaboration with J Balvin. Two of their Hebrew singles in 2019 were made in collaboration with Eden Ben Zaken, Stephane Legar, and Marvin Casey.

Seven more singles came out in 2020, including "Further Up (Na, Na, Na, Na, Na)", an English single made in collaboration with Pitbull. Their other English singles of 2020 were "Milli", made in collaboration with Flipp Dinero and "Shake Ya Boom Boom" with the Black Eyed Peas. In June 2020 they released the song "Habib Alby" with Nasrin Kadri as the official song for Tel Aviv Pride Week in 2020. The song's lyrics alternate between Hebrew and English and contain some Arabic phrases, including the song's name, which means "Love of my Heart" in Arabic. They made four other Hebrew singles in 2020, one of which included an appearance by Miri Mesika and another with Anna Zak. They were among the 40 Israeli artists who were featured in the charity single Katan Aleinu, which Static and Jordi wrote and composed, to support hospitals battling the COVID-19 pandemic.

In June 2021, Static and Ben El released their first album, "Shiva Yerechim" ("Seven Moons"). The album has seven songs, six of which feature a collaboration with another Israeli artist. They also released five singles throughout 2021, including a cover of Roni Duani's Hebrew version of Christine Milton's "Superstar" made in collaboration with several other artists as well as the English song "Bella".

In 2022, they released "Ziki Ziki", featuring Snoop Dogg. In August 2022, Israel Hayom published recordings in which Tavori argued with and threatened his former partner, Ortal Amar, over their son, causing controversy in Israel. On August 25, 2022, amid the controversy, the duo announced in a joint statement on social media that they had "reached the end of our musical project" and would pursue separate careers. Performances already scheduled for that evening went ahead.

=== After the split ===
In February 2023, Static released his first solo album, Liraz, with Jordi among its collaborators. His second solo album, Leharim, with 12 songs, followed on April 9, 2024.

After the split, Tavori left Saban Music Group and signed with the Israeli label Helicon. He released his first solo single, "Ototo", in January 2024, ahead of his debut solo album. In March 2024, he released three further songs from the album.

== Discography ==
=== Singles ===
List of singles, with selected chart positions
English title	Hebrew title	Year	Peak chart positions		Album
English title	Hebrew title	Year	ISR	US Latin	Album
"Barbie"	ברבי	2015	—	—	Non-album singles
"Kvish Hachof"	כביש החוף	2016	—	—	Non-album singles
"Silsulim"	סלסולים	2016	—	—	Non-album singles
"Stam"	סתם	2016	1	—	Non-album singles
"Zahav"	זהב	2017	1	—	Non-album singles
"Tudo Bom"	טודו בום	2017	1	—	Non-album singles
"Hakol Letova"	הכל לטובה	2017	1	—	Non-album singles
"Namaste"	נמסטה	2018	1	—	Non-album singles
"Kawaii"	קאוואי	2018	1	—	Non-album singles
"Gumigam"	גומיגם	2018	1	—	Non-album singles
"Broke Ass Millionaire"		2018	—	—	Non-album singles
"Yassu" (with Eden Ben Zaken and Stephane Legar)	יאסו	2019	1	—	Non-album singles
"Tudo Bom" (solo or with J Balvin)		2019	—	—	Non-album singles
"Bananot"	בננות	2019	1	—	Non-album singles
"Imale"	אמאלה	2019	1	—	Non-album singles
"Further Up (Na, Na, Na, Na, Na)" (featuring Pitbull)		2020	1	15	Non-album singles
"We" (featuring Miri Mesika)		2020	1	—	Non-album singles
"Habib Alby" (featuring Nasrin Kadri)	חביב אלבי	2020	2	—	Non-album singles
"Milli" (featuring Flipp Dinero)		2020	13	—	Non-album singles
"Kapit Ahat Shel Tov"	כפית אחת של טוב	2020	—	—	Non-album singles
"Kubiyot" (featuring Anna Zak)	קוביות	2020	2	—	Non-album singles
"Shake Ya Boom Boom" (with the Black Eyed Peas)		2020	1	—	Non-album singles
"Cactus"	קקטוס	2021	—	—	Non-album singles
"Superstar" (featuring Noa Kirel, Jonathan Mergui, Stéphane Legar, Agam Buhbut and Gal Adam)	סופרסטאר	2021	—	—	Non-album singles
"Layla Ma'adan"	לילה מעדן	2021	—	—	Non-album singles
"Bella"		2021	—	—	Non-album singles
"Hanukkah"	חנוכה	2021	—	—	Non-album singles
"Ahavti Lakh" (featuring Omer Adam)	אהבתי לך	2022	—	—	Non-album singles
"Ziki Ziki" (featuring Snoop Dogg)		2022	—	—	Non-album singles

=== Seven Moons album ===
Song	Name meaning	Featuring
שבעה ירחים (Shiva Yerechim)	Seven Moons	
כוסות ריקות ("Kosot Rekot")	Empty Cups	Lior Narkis
אפס מאמץ ("Efes Ma'amatz")	Zero Effort	Netta Barzilai
רובינזון קרוזו ("Robinzon Kruzo")	Robinson Crusoe	Ran Danker
גשם מתוק ("Geshem Matok")	Sweet Rain	Rami Kleinstein
העיר הגדולה ("HaIr HaGdola")	The Big City	Agam Buhbut
אורות ("Orot")	Lights	Ron Nesher

== See also ==
- Music of Israel
