= Saving Shuli =

- לשחרר את שולי
- Written by: Uri Katz
- Edited by: Ilana Raina, Nir Nahum
- Music by: Ran Shem Tov
- Release date: 1 July 2021
- Running time: 90 minutes
- Language: Hebrew

Saving Shuli (Hebrew: לשחרר את שולי, romanized: Leshacherer Et Shuli, lit. 'Saving Shuli') is a 2021 Israeli comedy film. The film is based on a popular skit from the show Am Sgoola (Hebrew: עם סגולה). It was written by Uri Katz and directed by Ben Bachar.

The film achieved significant commercial success, becoming one of the highest-grossing Israeli film in recent years. It attracted approximately one million viewers to cinemas across Israel, making it the fourth most-watched Israeli film of all time.

Despite its considerable box office success, Releasing Shuli received generally negative reviews from critics. Common criticisms focused on its humor and storyline, which some reviewers found lacking in originality and depth.

The film sequel, Saving Shuli 2, was delayed because of COVID-19 and Gaza war and was released on 17 July 2025.

== Plot ==
Avihu Kahalani's son Shuli is kidnapped by a Colombian drug kingpin. He turns to his two life-long friends Nati and Bezalel for help. All three men are middle-aged Israelis of Yemeni descent from the Marmorak village in Rehovot, Israel. They travel to Colombia, where they attempt to rescue Shooli without cultural knowledge of Colombia. These three simple, traditional Israelies are utterly out of their depth as they attend underground pool parties populated by gun-toting women in bikinis in order to track down leads to Shuli's whereabouts. They also unwittingly get dragged into organ trafficking and direct confrontation with a Colombian drug cartel, though they have no combat training. The psychedelic experience that results from them licking a toad does nothing to help them along.

== Cast ==
- Zion Baruch as Avihu Kahalani
- Asi Yisraelof as Bezalel "Batzi" ben Zion Bentzihu
- Shalom Michaelshvili as Nathaniel "Nati"
- Liron Weissman as Coral "Kurchel"
- David Shaul as Shuli Kahalani
- Avia Malka as Almog Rosen
- Carolina Rodríguez Naranjo as Andrea Maria Silva Posada del Mar Rodríguez Naranjo
- Pedro Andres Calvo Gómez as Ricardo
- Aviva Avidan as Eti Margalit
- Uri Katz as Avner
- Omer Adam
