= Na'ama Idan =

Israeli haredi businesswoman

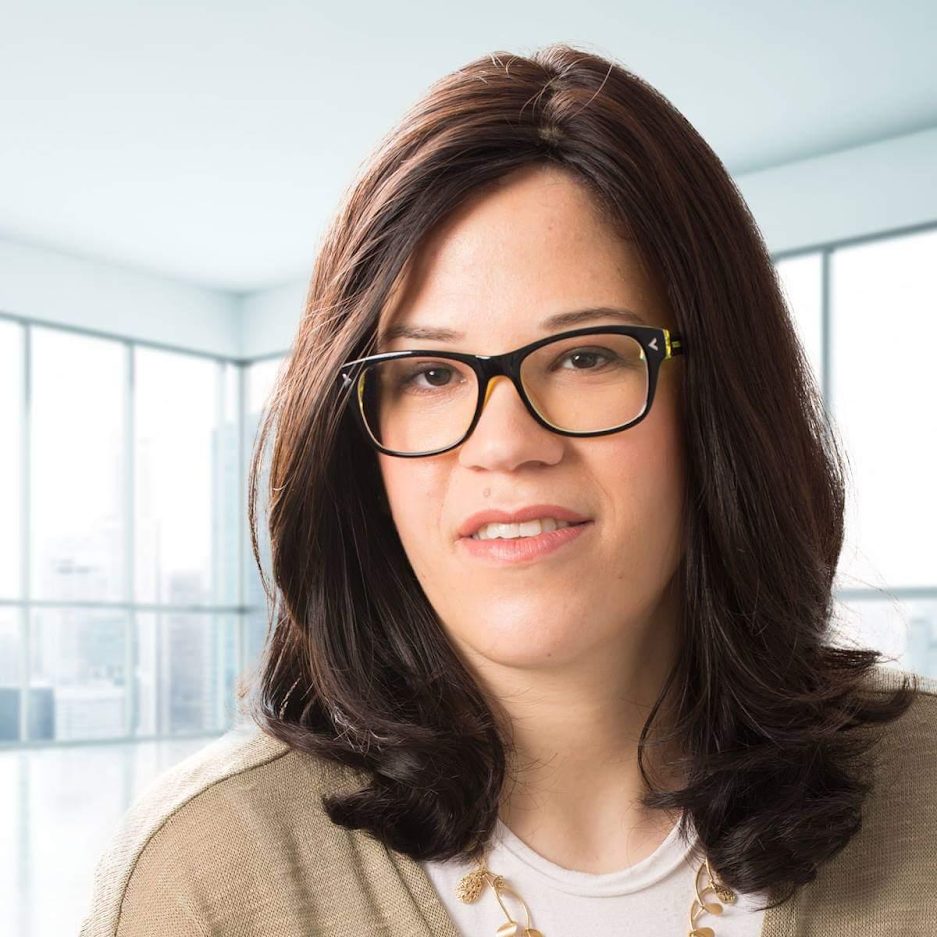
- Na'ama Idan in 2017
- Born: Na'ama Dabush; 1982 (age 43–44); Kfar Saba, Israel
- Occupation: Publicist
- Employer: Yom LeYom

Na'ama Idan (Hebrew: נעמה עידן; born September 3, 1982, in Kfar Saba) is an israeli haredi businesswoman. She was the owner and CEO of the newspaper "Yom LeYom" - the first Haredi publisher in Israel.

== Biography ==
Idan was born Na'ama Dabush and grew up in Kfar Saba, Israel. Her father, Amos, was one of the founders of the local branch of the Sephardic haredi party Shas, and a member of the city council for this party.

== Career ==
Idan studied education and worked as a teacher in the 'Maayan Hachinuch HaTorani' network, affiliated with the Shas party.

Idan founded in 2013 the advertising agency "Idan 2020". In 2017, a close relative of hers, the businessman Kobi Maimon, owner of the real estate holding Nitsba, purchased the newspaper Yom LeYom, which was affiliated with the Shas party; with this, she became the first ultra-orthodox woman to own a newspaper and be its editor-in-chief. The newspaper attracted controversy in the Haredi world for being the first Ultra-Orthodox newspaper not to blur or remove pictures of women and for having a column written by the member of the Knesset and then minister Amir Ohana, who is openly gay. While Shas had shares in the newspaper, it had no managing influence over it, and Idan's refusal to turn the newspaper into a mouthpiece of the party caused that on July 30, 2017, Aryeh Deri announced Shas' disengagement from "Yom LeYom" and the establishment of the newspaper "HaDerech". On the same day HaDerech began to be published, approximately 2,000 subscribers of Yom LeYom canceled their subscriptions; due to its financing based on subscriptions, losses of 720,000 NIS and after a long battle with Shas politicians, in late 2019, her shares in Yom LeYom were sold to the businessmen Yossi Shinover and Ariel Konik; however, she remains as the Marketing Vice-President of the newspaper.

== Personal life ==
Idan is married to Yinon, and is a mother of six. She lives in Bnei Brak. She has admitted being a fan of the Israeli singer Omer Adam.
