= Ron Nesher =

Israeli rapper, songwriter and composer

- רון נשר
- Born: Ran Menasherov; August 25, 1983 (age 43); Tel-Aviv, Israel
- Occupations: Rapper; songwriter; composer; Impressionist
- Height: 204.0 cm (6 ft 8.3 in)
- Musical career
- Also known as: SkyDaMac; Sky; Ron Sky Nesher
- Genre: Israeli hip hop
- Instrument: vocals
- Years active: 2003–present
- Label: Unicell

Ron Nesher (Hebrew: רון נשר; born 25 August 1983), known by his stage name SkyDaMac or Sky, is an Israeli rapper, songwriter and composer.

== Personal life ==
Ran Menasherov was born in Tel-Aviv, Israel, to a Jewish family. He resides in Ramat Gan with Yafit Amon, her son from a previous marriage, and their two daughters.

== Music career ==
In 2007 Nesher released his first song "Lo Ba Stam" (Hebrew: לא בא סתם) with the Jewish reggae and hip hop group Yamanz (Hebrew: יאמאנז).

After his military service in the anti-aircraft warfare of Heyl Ha'Avir Nesher signed to the record label of the Israeli rapper Subliminal, TACT Records. After that in 2010 he formed with Omri 69 Segal, E-Z and Ron B the hip hop group "The Idioteam" (Hebrew: האידיוטים). In 2011 they released their debut mixtape "Mi Idiot" (Hebrew: מי אידיוט).

In 2014 Nesher wrote to the Israeli singer Eliad Nachum some songs of his debut album Siman (Hebrew: סימן); "Siman", "Hofshi", "Miklat" and "Att". At the same year he posted on his Facebook page a post against Hanin Zuabi, an Israeli Knesset member.

In 2015 Nesher released the song "DubiGal" featuring Static & Ben El Tavori and Jordi.

In 2018 he released his debut album Rosh HaAinshtein/Einlonimus, a double album which includes 24 tracks and guest appearances from Moshik Afia, Omri 69 Segal and Shaked Komemy.

== Discography ==
- 2011: Mi Idiot (with The Idioteam)
- 2018: Rosh HaAyinstein/Einlonimus

== See also ==
- Israeli hip hop
- Music of Israel
