= Further Up (Na, Na, Na, Na, Na) =

2020 song by Static and Ben El

Single by Static & Ben El and Pitbull
- B-side: "Subelo (Further Up)"
- Released: January 10, 2020
- Genre: Dance-pop; reggaeton
- Length: 2:31
- Label: Saban Music Group
- Songwriters: Leeraz Rousseau; Armando Perez; Ini Kamoze; Salaam Remi; Chris Kenner; Álvaro Rodríguez; Troy Scott; Kenton Nix
- Producers: Jordi; Ten Towns

Static & Ben El singles chronology
"Imale" (2019)	"Further Up (Na, Na, Na, Na, Na)" (2020)	"We" (2020)

Pitbull singles chronology
"Me Quedaré Contigo" (2019)	"Further Up (Na, Na, Na, Na, Na)" (2020)	"Suda" (2020)

"Further Up (Na, Na, Na, Na, Na)" is a song by Israeli musical duo Static & Ben El and Cuban rapper Pitbull. The single was released on January 10, 2020, by Saban Music Group.

== Background ==
The single is the follow-up English record by Static & Ben El, after "Tudo Bom" featuring Colombian reggaeton artist J Balvin. It includes a sample from Jamaican reggae artist Ini Kamoze's 1994 hit, "Here Comes the Hotstepper". Pitbull would go on to work with Saban Music Group again for his own charity single, titled "I Believe That We Will Win (World Anthem)", in which all proceeds from song sales, streaming and views are being donated to Feeding America and the Anthony Robbins Foundation.

== Music video ==
The video was released alongside the single on January 10, 2020 through Static & Ben El's official YouTube channel. It produced by ROMS Studios and surpassed six million views on YouTube in less than a week. The video has garnered over 29 million views as of May 2020. In addition, animated lyric videos for both the original and Spanish version of the song were released on Static & Ben El's official YouTube channel. Later, it is noticed in Daddy Yankee & Nicky Jam's hit single Muevelo.

== Commercial usage ==
The song was featured in the debut Peacock TV commercial by NBC, titled 'Timeless Classics'. The commercial was first aired on May 11, 2020. The song was also sampled in Akull's song Gadbadi.

== Track listing ==
Further Up (Na, Na, Na, Na, Na)
No.	Title	Length
1.	"Further Up (Na, Na, Na, Na, Na)" (featuring Pitbull)	2:31
2.	"Subelo (Further Up)" (featuring Pitbull and Chesca)	2:21
3.	"Further Up (Na, Na, Na, Na, Na)" (Ten Towns Remix) (featuring Pitbull)	2:31

Further Up (Na, Na, Na, Na, Na) [Remixes]
No.	Title	Length
1.	"Further Up (Na, Na, Na, Na, Na)" (Sak Noel Remix) (featuring Pitbull)	2:45
2.	"Further Up (Na, Na, Na, Na, Na)" (IAmChino Remix) (featuring Pitbull)	3:33
3.	"Further Up (Na, Na, Na, Na, Na)" (Radio Edit) (featuring Pitbull)	2:32

== Charts ==
Weekly chart performance
Chart (2020)	Peak position
Israel International Airplay (Media Forest)	1
Turkey International Airplay (Radiomonitor Türkiye)	1
US Hot Latin Songs (Billboard) "Subelo (Further Up)"	15
US Latin Airplay (Billboard) "Subelo (Further Up)"	1
US Latin Rhythm Airplay (Billboard) "Subelo (Further Up)"	1

== See also ==
- List of Billboard number-one Latin songs of 2020
