= Omer Adam - Live at Ramat Gan Stadium =

Israeli music tour

Live at Ramat Gan Stadium
- Tour by Omer Adam
- Location: Israel
- Venue: Ramat Gan Stadium
- Start date: June 9, 2026
- End date: June 15, 2026
- No. of shows: 4
- Guests: Liran Danino
- Attendance: 166,332

'Live at Ramat Gan Stadium' was a multi night residency tour headlined by Israeli musician Omer Adam in June 2026. The four-night stadium ran at Ramat Gan Stadium (41,583 venue capacity) on 9, 10, 11 and 15 June. The shows formed part of his ongoing series of large-scale Israeli performances and featured a full production with a live band, dancers and a repertoire of his major hits. Several of the nights sold out (notably 11 and 15 June), continuing his pattern of high-demand multi-night residencies at the venue. Doors typically opened around 6:00–8:15 pm, with the main set running roughly 9:00–11:00 pm (about two hours).

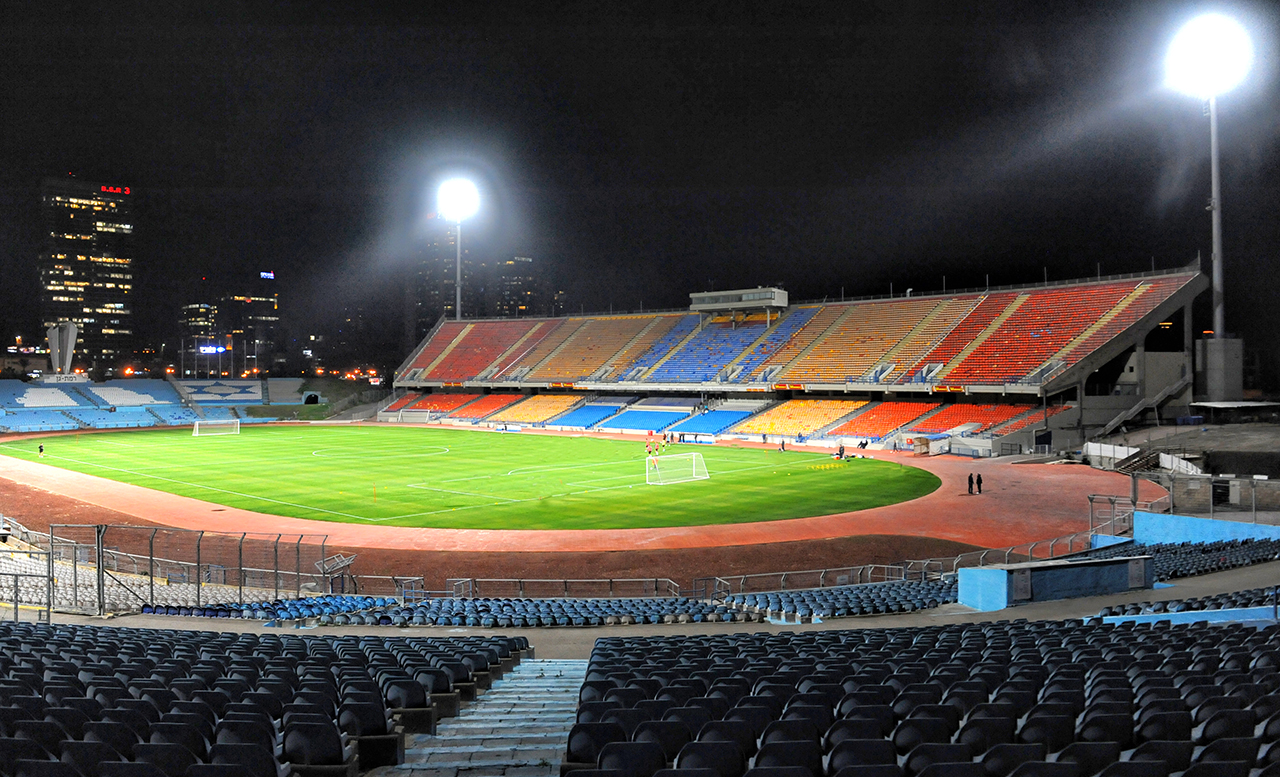
Ramat Gan Stadium - where the residency tour operated

== Background ==
In May 2026, Omer Adam announced 3 stadium shows, the shows were promoted as a return to Ramat Gan Stadium with a fresh production. Official Ticketmaster listings and promotional copy framed them as a new show featuring a specially built stage, a full live band of musicians, dancers, and updated arrangements of his major hits (including “Malkat Hador,” “Tequila,” “Tehom,” “Shnei Meshugaim,” and many others). Within hours of the announcement & tickets going live, all three shows were nearing venue exhaustion, Omer announced a 4th and final show shortly after due to the overwhelming response. All 4 shows were sold out shortly after going live to the public.

== Development ==
General ticket sales opened in late May 2026. Demand was immediate and intense: the initial three nights (9, 10 and 11 June) sold out within roughly two and a half hours. Adam responded publicly on Instagram Stories with a short, emotional post (“אמאלה, אין לי מילים… פתחנו מופע נוסף, אוהב אתכם” — translating “Mom, I have no words… we opened another show, I love you”), announcing a fourth date on 15 June .

Ramat Gan Municipality purchased a block of 3,000 tickets in advance for the 11 June show and offered them at a heavily subsidized price of 169 NIS (instead of the regular 349 NIS). Eligibility was limited to local high-school students, active-duty soldiers, and reservists who had served at least 80 days since 7 October 2023. Sales of these subsidized tickets took place in two waves (1 June and 3 June at 16:00) via a dedicated municipal link to manage demand and ensure fairness. Each eligible person could buy one subsidized ticket (later expanded slightly to allow an additional full-price companion ticket in some cases). In the days leading up to the first show, coverage focused heavily on logistics and crowd management. Police announced extensive, staggered road closures around the stadium (including key bridges and access roads) from late afternoon through the end of each evening. Israel Railways coordinated additional “fill-and-go” trains from nearby Bnei Brak station to multiple destinations across the country to ease post-show congestion. Security screening was strict, with standard prohibitions on weapons, glass, alcohol, and certain personal items.

There was also short-term uncertainty caused by regional security tensions and temporary gathering restrictions in early June. At least one related date elsewhere was postponed, and the Ramat Gan shows briefly faced questions, but restrictions were lifted in time for the run to proceed as planned.

Overall, the pre-show period was defined by extremely rapid sell-outs, the quick addition of a fourth night, municipal support for local residents and service members, and detailed public planning for traffic, transport and security — all underscoring the scale of demand for Adam’s stadium performances at that time.

== Set list ==
This set list is from the 9 June 2026 show at Ramat Gan Stadium

1. Tequila (intro)
2. Ben 32 (live debut)
3. Orot Khulim (live debut)
4. Mispacha Ve Kavod (live debut)
5. Rio de Janeiro (live debut)
6. Malkat Hador
7. Plaza Athenee (live debut)
8. Hoze Baneshama (acoustic)
9. Pina Shel Sheket / Meusheret (acoustic)
10. Lehinese Halaylah / Paskol Hayay (acoustic)
11. Tkufah Hara (live debut)

continuing with a mix of established hits and medleys that typically included songs such as:

1. Leylot Ve Klalot
2. Haverot Shelach / Leylot Yafim / Maym Shkufim / Partzufim / Hitorarti Im Namer / Temprature
3. Pa’am Bachaim / Ohevet Oti Amiti
4. Eifo Shetagidi
5. Politica Ve Sex / Ahuvati Kfar Lo Roa Oti / Levad Al Hamitah
6. Nesicha / Noe’tset Mabat / Sipur Yeshan / Bucharest
7. Tehom
8. Mami Ze Nigmar
9. Ekdach / Khoref Ba Oto
10. Hashir She’at Ahavt / Names Mimech
11. Ahavat HaShem
12. Kol Akeva Le Tova
13. Yaasu Lanu Kavod / Mahapecha Shel Simha / Tel Aviv / Zorek Ta Aniva / Shnei Meshugaim
14. Rak Shelach (outro)
