= Eliad Nachum =

Israeli singer

- אליעד נחום
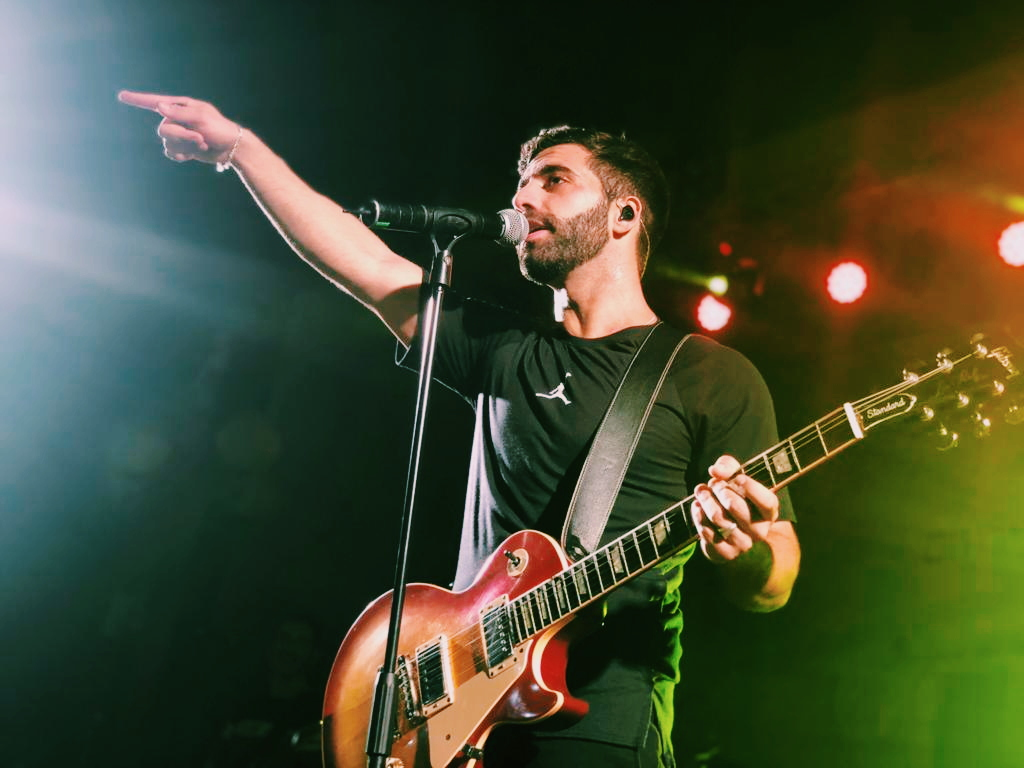
- Born: January 31, 1990 (age 36); Bat Yam, Israel
- Occupations: Singer; actor; composer; songwriter; dancer
- Years active: 1996–present
- Musical career
- Genres: Pop; dance; rock; reggae; R&B
- Instruments: Vocals, guitar, piano, drums, ukulele, harmonica
- Years active: 2011–present
- Label: NMC

Eliad Nachum (Hebrew: אליעד נחום; born January 31, 1990), known professionally by his first name Eliad is an Israeli singer, songwriter and television actor.

== Biography ==
Eliad Nachum was born in Bat Yam, to Israeli parents of Mizrahi and Sephardic Jewish (Iraqi-Jewish and Turkish-Jewish) descent. He studied in the Orat Ramat Yossef junior high school, and in the music class of the Ramot high school in Bat Yam. In 2008 he enlisted in the IDF and served as a singer in the band of Education and Youth Corps. Parallel to his service, he worked on a debut album with the record producers TripL.

== Acting career ==
In 1997 Eliad started to participate in the successful series "Shemesh" as Bar.

In 1998 he acted in the movie Ben-Gurion and dubbed on Popeye and Son.

In 2004 he acted a guest role on "HaPijamot". In 2009 he dubbed Jazz in "Joniur Baktana" and in 2011 he acted in "Alifim".

== Music career ==
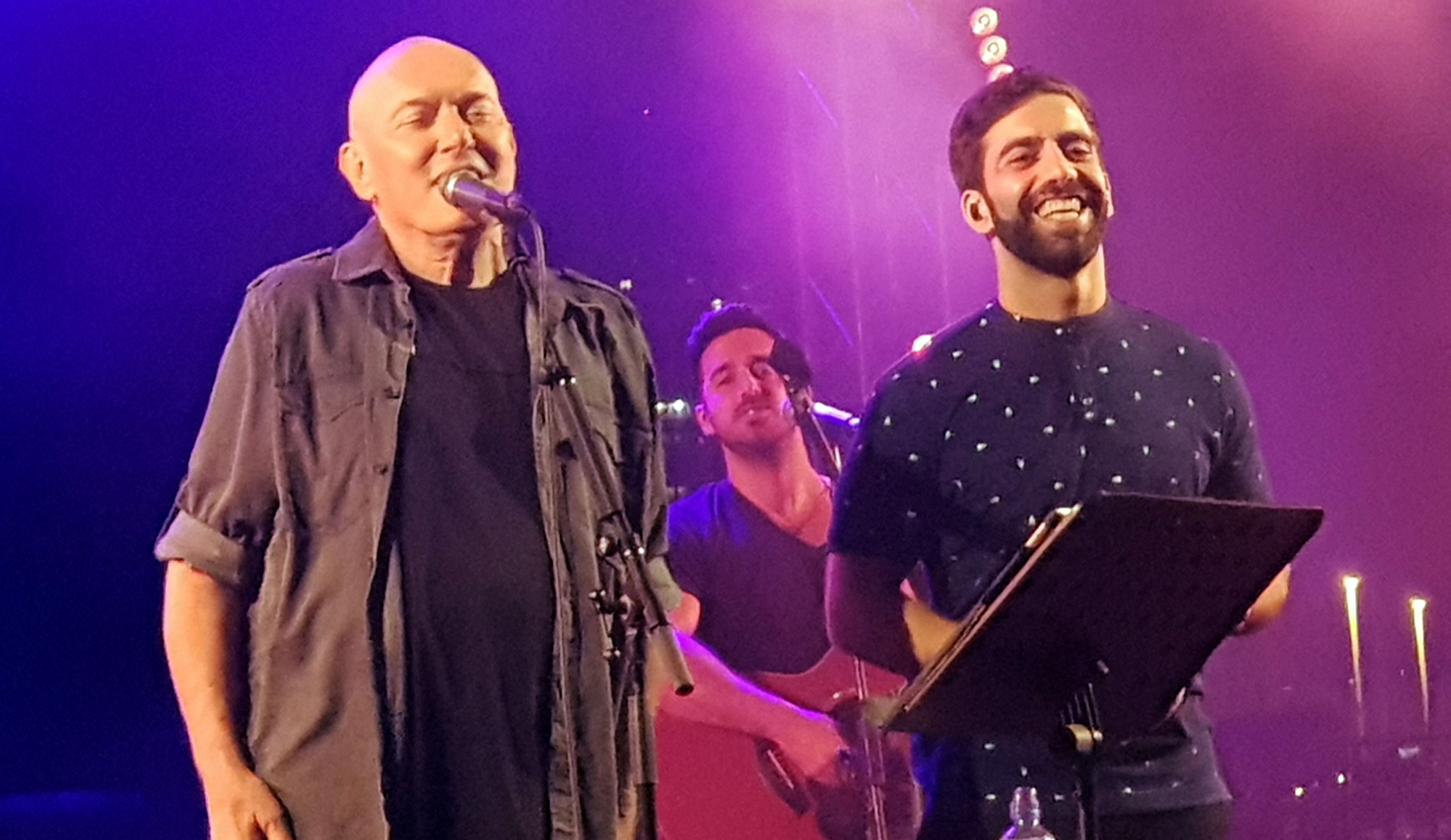
Eliad Nachum appears on show of Shlomi Shabat.

In 2011 he released with TripL band his first single, "Moving", from their debut album "Ready, Set, Pop". the single included on the international collection "Boiling Music".

In 2014 he released as singles the songs "Miklat", "Hofshi" and "Siman", that written by Nachum with the Israeli rapper Ron Nesher, the songs included on his debut album "Siman".

In 2015 he released the single "Matok Kshemarly", a song from his debut album "Siman". the song was one of the prominent and successful songs at the same year. the song reached the first place on the weekly chart of Media Forest and stayed 5 weeks in the first place on the weekly chart of Galgalatz.

On September 10, 2016, he elected for the Breakout of The Year and Song of The Year with the song "Matok Kshemarly" at the yearly chart of Galgalatz of 5775 AM.

== Discography ==
- 2013: Ready, Set, Pop (with TripL)
- 2015: Siman
- 2016: Or
- 2018: Tamid Chalamti
