= Yael Shelbia =

Israeli model and actress (born 2001)

Yael Shelbia יעל שלביה
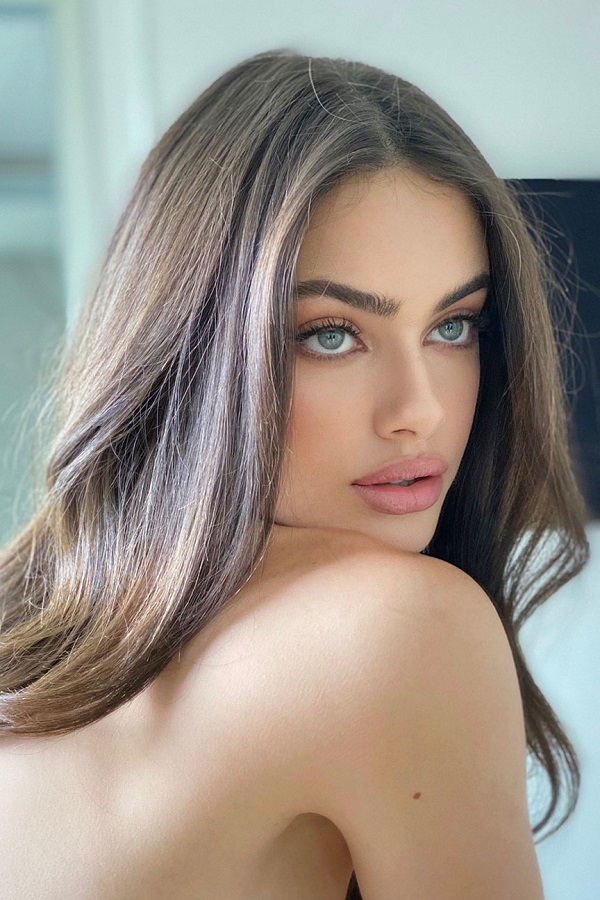
- Shelbia in 2021
- Born: Yael Shelbia Cohen; 31 August 2001 (age 25); Nahariya, Israel
- Occupations: Model; actress
- Years active: 2016–present
- Partner(s): Barak Shamir (2018–19); Brandon Korff (2019–22); Omer Adam (2022–25); Lance Stroll (2026–present)
- Modeling information
- Height: 1.74 m (5 ft 9 in)
- Hair color: Dark-brown
- Eye color: Cerulean (light-blue)
- Agency: ITM (Israel); Model Link (Sweden); Elite (Miami, US); Storm Model Management London (UK); ModelWerk (Germany); AddictedToModels (Austria); Storm Model Management (Los Angeles, US)
- Website: itmodels.co.il/yael-shelbia

Yael Shelbia Cohen (Hebrew: יעל שלביה כהן; born 31 August 2001) is an Israeli model and actress. She has appeared in a number of international modeling campaigns. She became a model for Israeli brands Castro from 2017 and Renuar from 2018, and currently stars in the Israeli television series Palmach on Teen Nick via yes.

== Early life ==
Yael Shelbia Cohen was born in Nahariya, to a dati leumi family. She has four brothers. Her mother, Ofra, holds a master's degree in urban planning and geography, works as a librarian at the Harel Ulpanat where Yael studies, and is also a real estate agent. Her father, is a factory worker.

She uses her middle name Shelbia as her professional surname, which was inherited from her Djerbian great-grandmother's family that is of both Mizrahi Jewish and Sephardi Jewish (Tunisian-Jewish) descent. She began by uploading selfies she took by herself on Instagram shortly before her 16th birthday. As a result of finding her photos on her Instagram account, she later received an offer to take photos from the professional photographer Marina Moskowitz.

She has received additional media attention due to her Orthodox Jewish background, as she keeps Kosher and observes Shabbat, which initially led to controversy in Shelbia's Orthodox Jewish religious community in Israel.

As of 2020, Shelbia has served as a soldier in the Israeli Air Force of the Israel Defense Forces, rather than serving in the Sherut Leumi as a civilian. The latter is what most religious Jewish girls in Israel opt to do.

== Career ==
Her fashion modeling soon led to controversy and opposition in her Ulpana school, which threatened to send a letter to the Israeli Education Ministry to expel her. Her family however, had been supportive of her career, so long as it would not interfere with her religious studies. And after consultation with Israel's Education Ministry, she was allowed to continue her studies on condition of following certain guidelines. However, combining a modeling career with a religious lifestyle, has led to difficulties, including in terms of modesty of clothing. During a modeling campaign in Milan, she had to live on crackers for four days, as she could not find kosher food. She says she had lost many modeling contracts back then, due to her keeping of the Sabbath and choices in clothing.

The speed of the success of her career both in Europe and Israel, has led to comparisons to fellow Israeli models Shlomit Malka, Dorit Revelis and Sofia Mechetner.

In 2018, she modelled for Kim Kardashian's brand KKW Beauty, where her photos were chosen by Kim Kardashian. In 2019, Shelbia was chosen to lead Kylie Jenner's Biotic Skincare range.

Also in 2019, she was cast for her debut acting role in a television series about the real-life Israeli Palmach forces. It is a teen adventure period drama series set in 1946, two pivotal years before the State of Israel was founded. A seemingly innocent training farm secretly functions as a Strike Forces (also known as Palmach) training base and recruitment center for exceptional teens, as well as a home-base for illegal Jewish immigration missions and special ops against the British Mandate. The show debuted in 2020, and Shelbia stars as Ruth Hirsch.

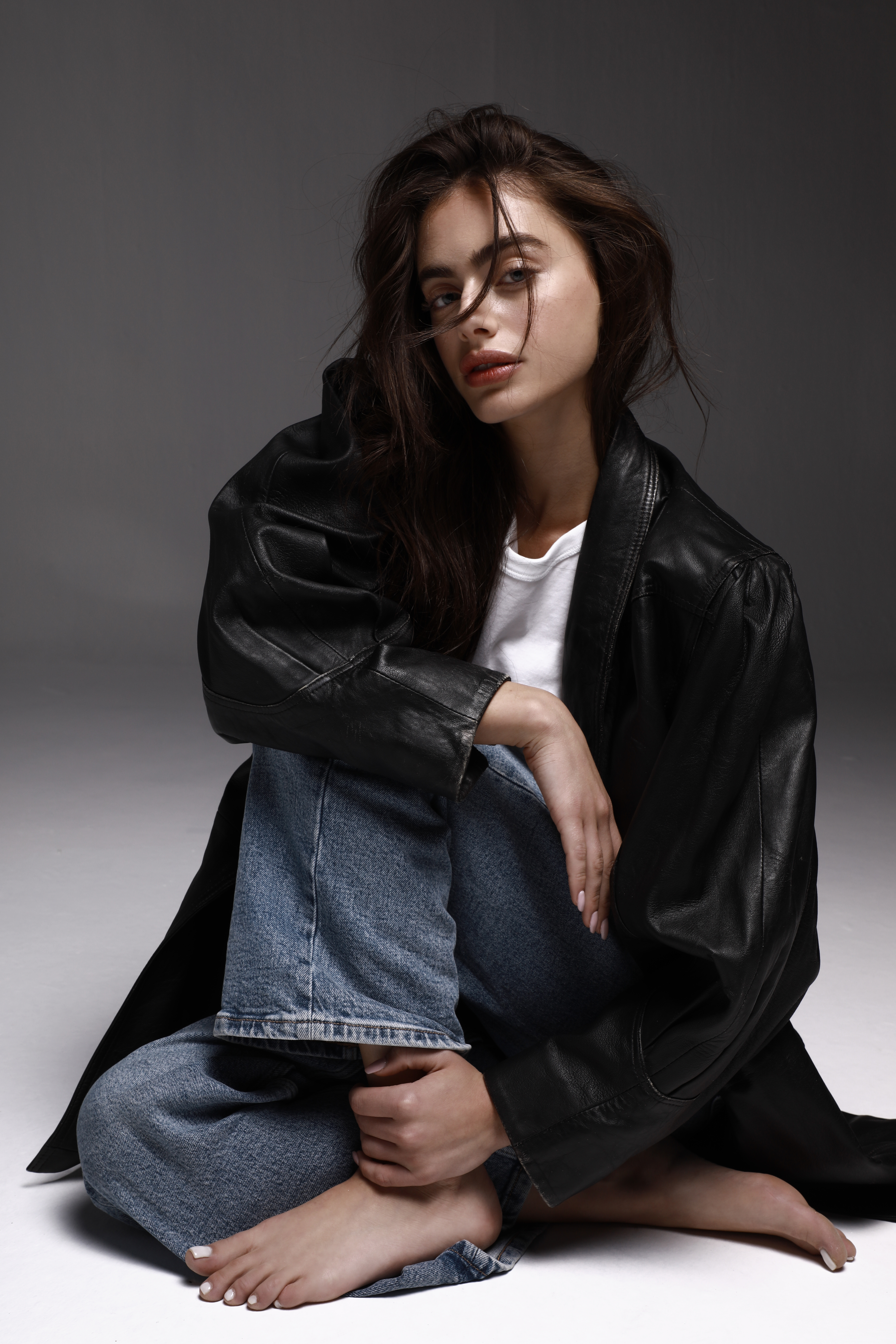
Yael Shelbia in 2022

Shelbia appeared on the August 2020 cover of the Bulgaria edition of fashion magazine Harper's Bazaar.

In 2020, the magazine TC Candler named Shelbia the most beautiful woman in the world. Shelbia previously appeared on the list's rankings in 2017, 2018, and 2019.

== Personal life ==
From 2018 to 2019, she was in a relationship with the model Barak Shamir.

From 2019 to 2022, she was in a relationship with the American billionaire Brandon Korff, son of Rabbi Yitzhak Aharon Korff, and grandson of billionaire Sumner Redstone.

In 2022, Shelbia began a relationship with singer Omer Adam, with whom she had been in a relationship previously. In January 2023, they moved to the United Arab Emirates and lived in Dubai. In May 2023, after about half a year in Dubai, they returned to live in Israel. In 2025, the couple separated.

Since 2025, she has been in a relationship with F1 driver Lance Stroll.

== See also ==
- Israeli fashion
- Women of Israel
- Women in the Israel Defense Forces
- List of Israelis
- List of Jewish actors
