= Gal Adam =

Israeli musical artist (born 2002)

Gal Adam גל אדם
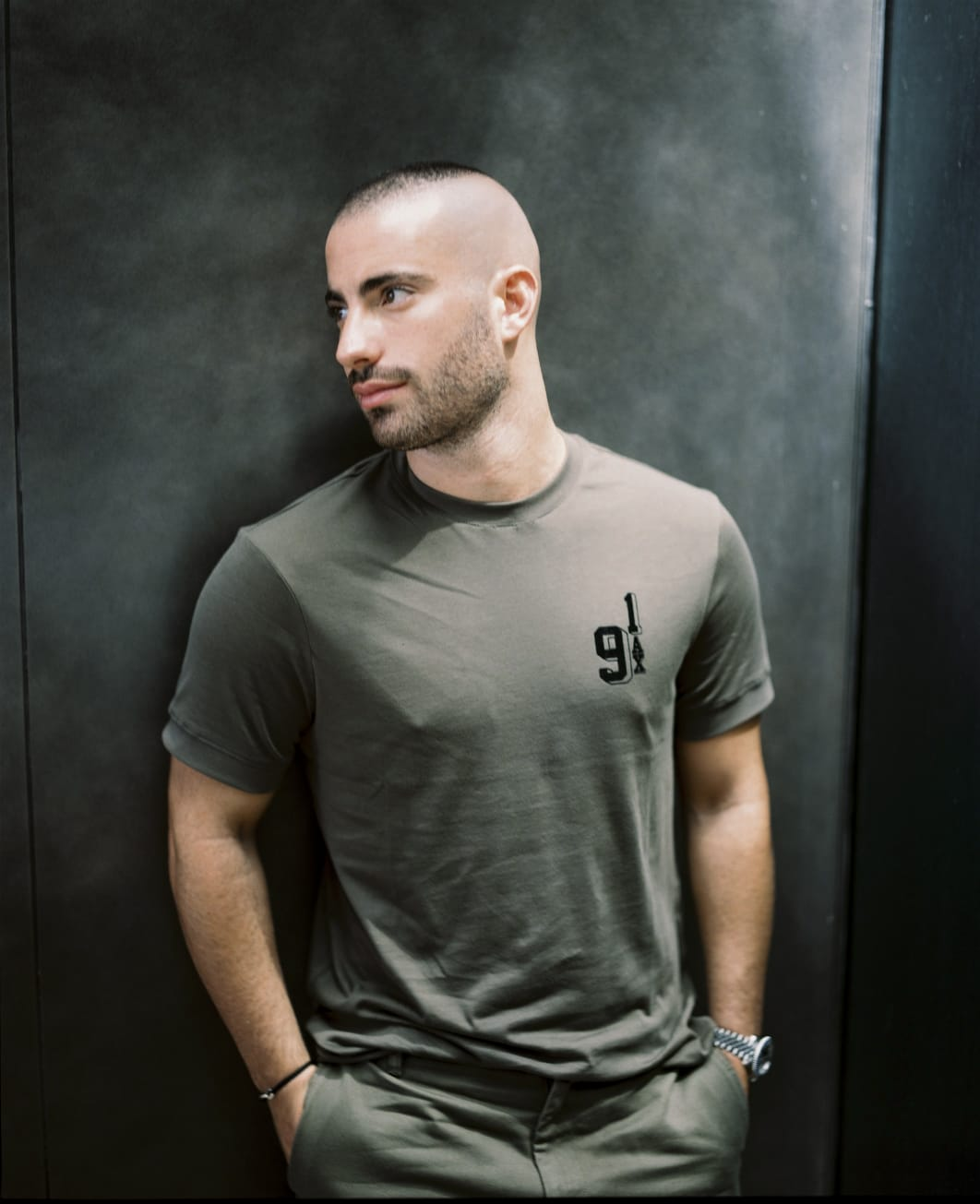
- Adam in 2023

Background information
- Born: March 7, 2002 (age 24)
- Genres: Pop music, R&B
- Occupation: Singer
- Years active: 2019–present
- Relatives: Omer Adam (brother)

Gal Adam (Hebrew: גל אדם; born March 7, 2002) is an Israeli singer.

== Biography ==
Born in 2002, he has two brothers, including the singer Omer Adam. His father, Major Yaniv Adam, served as deputy unit commander of the Sheldag and SMG unit of the 202nd Parachute Battalion. His family background is Caucasian on his father side and Ashkenazi on his mother side. Adam's grandfather is Lieutenant Colonel and Lieutenant Colonel Shmuel Adam, who is the cousin of Major Yekutiel Adam. His grandmother is the artist Aviva Shemer. In April 2021, he enlisted in the IDF.

Adam began his musical journey in 2018, when he released his debut single, "Take everything with you".

In May 2019, he released her second single, "Another Day Alone." That same year he released the singles "Kehi Thalev Sheli" and "Rai Film". The song "Bad Film" even took first place in the list of "popular videos" on YouTube. In March 2020, together with singer Agam Bohbot, he released the duet "Ebro two months", which was very successful on the streaming service and even reached number 11 on Spotify weekly Israeli songs chart. In addition, it was one of the most played songs on the platform in Israel during 2020.

Later that year, he released the single "Itach made me good." The song was praised. In September 2020, he released the single "Your Prisoner." In December, he released the single "Go to your life". On February 21, 2021, he released the single "No more of me", which peaked at number three on the Apple Music platform chart.

In July 2021, he participated in the summer show "Superstar" which included around six shows and took place for a week at the Menorah Mitvatim Hall alongside Noa Kirel, Static and Ben-El, Agam Bohbot, Margie and Stefan. In September 2021, he won Israel's "Breakthrough of the Year" title for 2021 at Israel Entertainme Chosen of the Year ceremony.

On October 19, 2022, his hit song, "Crazy", was released along with Nowruz, which reached first place in the official Galgalatz parade. On December 3, 2023, he released a cover version of the song "Karen Shemesh". On January 5, 2023, Adam released a song called "Our Falls", written and composed by Moshe ben Avraham and Odia Azoulai.

On March 30, 2023, Adam released a song called "Morocco" in honor of the holiday of Mimona. On May 22, 2023, he released his first mini-album, "Trio". On September 27, 2023, he released the single "Total Kiss".

On November 8, 2023, he published a cover of the song "When you are sad" by Amir Banyon together with singer Mor. On January 4, 2024, he released the single "With Time." On February 8, 2024, he released the single "Who We Have Become" featuring Spaceship. On April 8, he released the single "Want to Wake Up", which he wrote, composed, produced and arranged by himself. This is the first song in Adam career where he is responsible for all aspects of the creation. The song was created in the new home studio that Adam set up.

On May 7, he released the single "Big Dreams" ahead of Israel Memorial Day. The song was written and composed by Adam, Odia Azoulai, Aviv Peretz and Dror Mizrahi, in memory of Liav Elosh, a soldier of the Dovdvan unit who died in the Gaza war in December 2023.

== Personal life ==
Adam lives with his family in Mishmar HaShiv'a. Between 2018 and 2021 he was in a relationship with Noam Bohadana, niece of the model and actress Miri Bohadana.
