= Sarit Hadad =

Israeli singer (born 1978)

Sarit Hadad שרית חדד
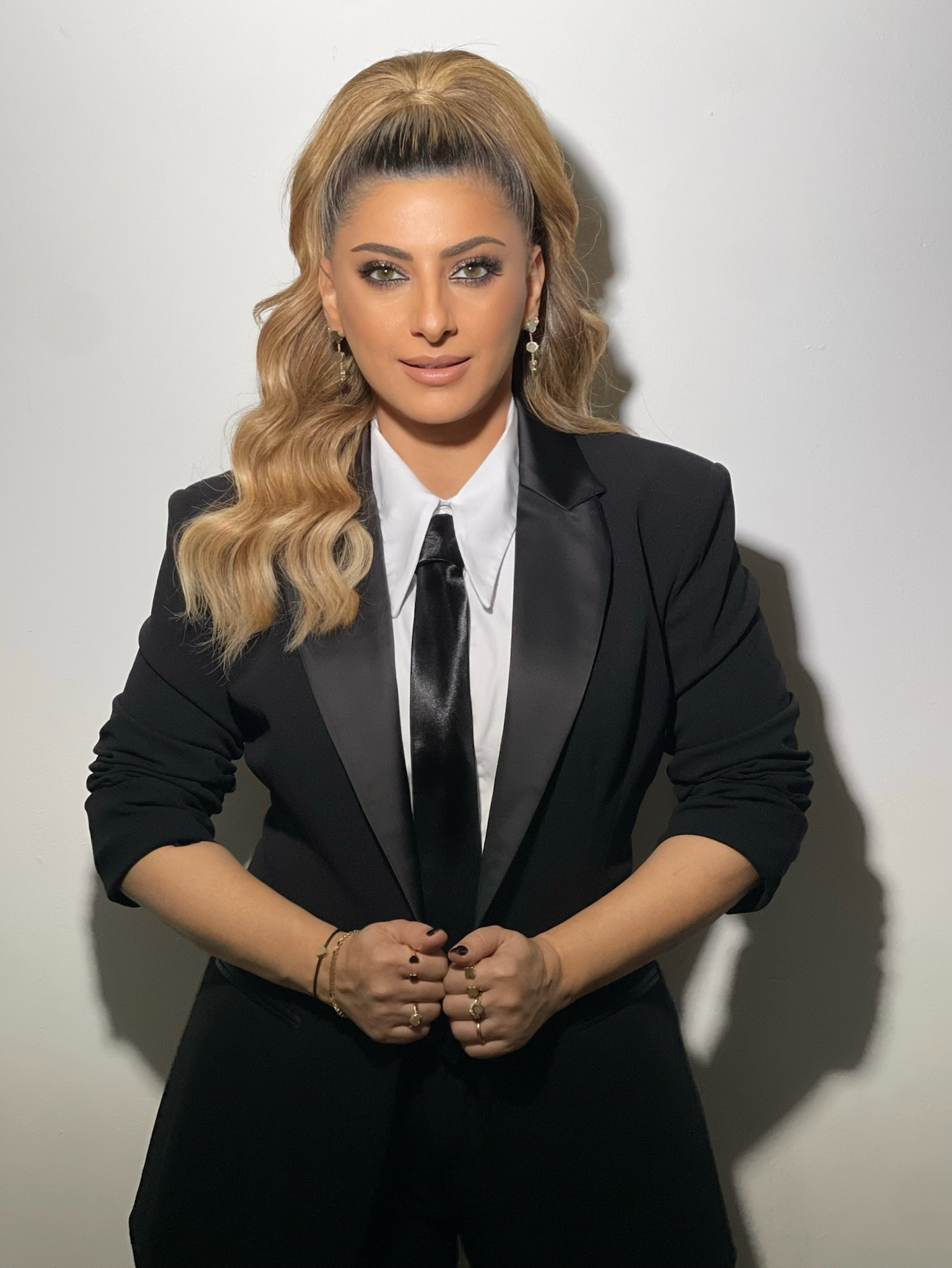
- Hadad in 2022

Background information
- Born: Sarah Hudadatov; 20 September 1978 (age 48); Afula, Israel
- Origin: Hadera, Israel
- Genres: Mizrahi; pop; Arabesque; dance
- Occupation: Singer
- Years active: 1994–present
- Label: Hed Arzi (2009–present) (Note: Avi Guetta Records/Play Records (1995–2000) Avi Guetta Records (2001–2004) Avi Guetta Records/Miss Music (2005–2008))

Sarit Hadad (Hebrew: שרית חדד, [saˈʁit χaˈdad]; born Sarah Hudadatov, 20 September 1978) is an Israeli singer. She is one of the most popular ethnic singers in Israel, and named as the "best female singer of the 2000s decade" by the Israeli channel 24 in October 2009. She also represented Israel in Eurovision 2002 with the song "Light a Candle".

== Biography ==
Hadad was born in Afula, Israel, to a family of Mountain Jews. Her parents had made aliyah from Dagestan in 1976. She is the youngest of eight children: she has four brothers and three sisters. In 1980, her family moved to Hadera. When she was 10 years old, she participated in a contest for young talent, where she performed on the piano. She also played the organ, guitar, accordion, and darbuka.

In September 2021, she came out of the closet and revealed her partner Tamar Yahalomi, releasing the song "Ahava Kmo Shelanu" ("A Love Like Ours").

On 21 September 2017, Hadad gave birth to a baby girl named Noya. In May 2020 Sarit and Tamar had a second daughter together, Shira and in November 2022 they had a third girl, Adele Esther. They separated in June 2025.

== Career ==
Hadad comes from a musical family and was recognized as a child prodigy. She began performing at the age of eight. Apart from classical piano, she taught herself to play the organ, guitar, accordion, and a Middle Eastern drum known as the darbuka. At the age of 15, she joined the Hadera Youth Band. When she was 16 she was discovered by Avi Gueta, who is still her manager.

Hadad's career as a pop singer has been successful, with many of her songs topping the Israeli charts. Israeli Television selected her to represent Israel in the Eurovision Song Contest 2002. The song, Nadlik Beyakhad Ner (Light A Candle) (in Hebrew: נדליק ביחד נר), came in 12th place.

In 2004, she collaborated with David D'Or to record the DVD Pets in Tunes.

In December 2006, Hadad drew crowds in New York City, Miami, and Los Angeles with her "Sing with Sarit" tour. In July 2007, Madonna revealed that she is a fan of Hadad, and enjoys listening to her music when dining at a kosher restaurant near her home.

Hadad performs Mizrahi music, while sometimes employing Arabic lyrics. She does not perform on Jewish holidays or on the Jewish Sabbath.

She has performed songs Hebrew, Arabic, English, Russian, Greek, Turkish and Bulgarian. She was the first Israeli to perform (professionally) in Jordan.

In 2020 she did a duet with Neta Barzilai, winner of the 2018 Eurovision Song Contest.

Hadad was a judge in the inaugural season of The Voice Israel on Israeli television.

== Awards and recognition ==
In 2010, Hadad was named Israel's Singer of the Decade by Galgalatz and Channel 24.

== Discography ==
=== Albums ===
1. Spark of Life – ניצוץ החיים – 1995
2. Live in France – הופעה חיה בצרפת – 1996
3. The Road I Chose – הדרך שבחרתי – 1997
4. Singing in Arabic – שרה בערבית – 1997
5. Law of Life – חוק החיים – 1998
6. Like Cinderella – כמו סינדרלה – 1999
7. Live at Heichal Hatarbut – ההופעה בהיכל התרבות – 1999
8. Doing What I Want – לעשות מה שבא לי – 2000
9. Sweet Illusions – אשליות מתוקות – 2001
10. Girl of Love – ילדה של אהבה – 2002
11. Only Love Will Bring Love – רק אהבה תביא אהבה – 2003
12. Celebration – חגיגה – 2004
13. Miss Music – 2005 – מיס מיוזיק
14. Princess of Happiness (for children) – 2006 – נסיכה של שמחה
15. The One Who Watches Over Me – 2007 – זה ששומר עליי
16. The Beat Collection – 2008 – האוסף הקצבי
17. The Smooth Collection – 2008 – האוסף השקט
18. The Race of Life – 2009 – מרוץ החיים
19. The Race of Life, Live at Caesarea 2009 – 2010 – שרית חדד בקיסריה, מרוץ החיים 2009
20. 20 – 2011
21. Days of joy – Part One – 2013 – 'ימים של שמחה – חלק א
22. Sarit Hadad – 2015 – שרית חדד
23. Sara Sings – 2017 -שרה שרה
24. 24 — 2022
25. 8 — 2024
26. Imperiyot Shel Shka'rim — 2025 — אימפריות של שקרים

=== Greatest Hits album ===
- The Collection – 2008 – האוסף
- The Best – 2012 – המיטב

=== Other ===
- Mega Mix-Like Cinderella – 1999 – מגה מיקס
- Once in a Lifetime (in Bloomfield Stadium) 2014 - פעם בחיים הופעה (באצטדיון בלומפילד(

=== DVDs ===
- DVD – The Show (Like Cinderella)
- DVD – In the Temple (Doing What I Want)
- DVD – In Caesarea (Sweet Illusions)
- DVD – Child of Love (in Caesarea)
- DVD – Only Love Will Bring Love (in Caesarea)
- DVD – Celebration (in Caesarea)
- DVD – All the Happy People (in Caesarea)
- DVD – Princess of Joy (For Kids)
- DVD – The Race of Life, Live at Caesarea 2009 (in Caesarea)
- DVD – Once in a Lifetime (in Bloomfield Stadium)

== Charts ==
Album

Year	Title	Chart	Position
1998	Law of Life	Israeli Albums Top 20	1
1999	Like Cinderella	Israeli Albums Top 20	1
1999	Live in the Culture Palace	Israeli Albums Top 20	9
2000	To Do What I Want	Israeli Albums Top 20	3
2001	Sweet Illusion	Israeli Albums Top 20	1
2002	Child of Love	Israeli Albums Top 20	1
2003	Only Love Will Bring Love	Israeli Albums Top 20	2
2004	Celebration	Israeli Albums Top 20	1
2004	Celebration	MusicaNeto Top 30	1
2005	Miss Music	Israeli Albums Top 20	1
2005	Miss Music	MusicaNeto Top 30	4
2007	The One Who Watches Over Me	Israeli Albums Top 20	1
2007	The One Who Watches Over Me	MusicaNeto Top 30	1
2009	The Race of Life	Israeli Albums Top 20	1
2010	The Race of Life, Live at Caesarea	Israeli Albums Top 20	2
2011	20	Israeli Albums Top 20	1
2013	Days of joy – Part One	Israeli Albums Top 20	2
2015	Sarit Hadad	Israeli Albums Top 20	1
2017	Sara Sings	Israeli Albums Top 20	1

== See also ==
- Mizrahi music
- Music of Israel

== Notes ==
Awards and achievements
Preceded by Tal Sondak with En Davar	Israel in the Eurovision Song Contest; 2002	Succeeded by Lior Narkis with Words for Love
