= Nasrin Kadri =

Israeli singer (born 1986)

Nasrin Kadri نسرين قادري
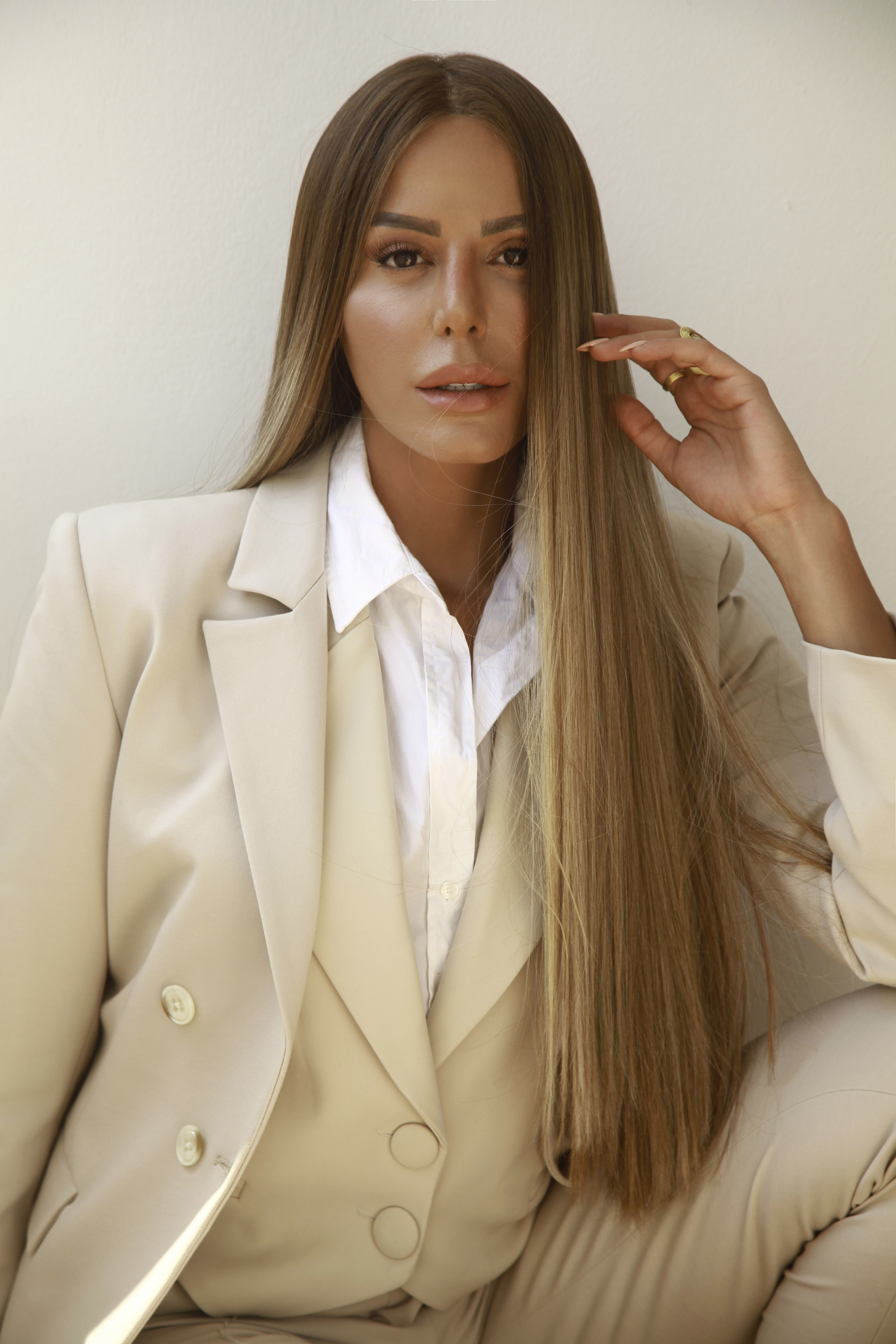
- Kadri in 2019

Background information
- Also known as: Nasreen Qadri
- Born: 2 September 1986 (age 39); Haifa, Israel
- Origin: Lod, Israel
- Genres: Mizrahi music; Arabic music
- Occupation: Singer
- Years active: 2012–present
- Spouse: Rom Shamir (m. 2022)
- Partner: Aviezer Ben-Moha (c. 2004–2017)

Nasrin Kadri or Nasreen Qadri (Arabic: نسرين قادري; Hebrew: נסרין קדרי; born 2 September 1986) is an Israeli singer. She mostly performs Hebrew songs, with a focus on Mizrahi music. However, she also performs Arabic songs, notably including those by Egyptian singer Umm Kulthum. In 2018, Kadri converted to Judaism from Islam.

== Biography ==
Kadri was born in Haifa, Israel, to a family of Arab Israelis on 2 September 1986. Originally raised a Muslim, she was raised in Lod, where her father was a taxi driver and her mother was a nurse. Around 2004, Qadri began a relationship with Israeli musician Aviezer Ben-Moha, who is Jewish. She began her conversion to Judaism during this time. In July 2017, the couple became engaged, but broke up and cancelled their upcoming wedding two months later.

Upon completing the process of converting in 2018, Kadri took the Hebrew name "Bracha" (בְּרָכָה), although her official name remains unchanged. However, because the rabbi who oversaw her conversion did so independently of the appropriate Israeli religious authorities, Kadri's Jewishness has not been recognized by the Chief Rabbinate of Israel or the Israeli Interior Ministry. She stated that she chose this particular rabbi because he allowed her to continue singing in public, which some devout Jews believe is against Jewish law.

In April 2022, Kadri married Rom Shamir, an Israeli musician from Ashdod, in the city of Rishon LeZion. Shamir is 12 years younger than Kadri. She gave birth to their son in October 2022.

In May 2024, Kadri posted on her social media a condemnation of Hamas, after Hamas released a video of female soldiers that it was holding as hostages. In her post, Kadri called Hamas's treatment of the women "a disgrace" which was not in line with Islam.

== Career ==
In 2011, after performing for years in small clubs and bars, she won the television star search program Eyal Golan Is Calling You.

Her debut album appeared in 2014.

In 2017, she was invited by Israeli culture minister Miri Regev to perform at the Sultan's Pool in Jerusalem in a ceremony marking Yom HaZikaron, Israeli Memorial Day. In July 2017, she shared the stage with Radiohead when the band appeared in Israel.

On September 4, 2018, she released her third album Learning to Walk. That same year she re-recorded the song "Goral Ehad" by Ofra Haza, for an album that honored Ofra Haza. On January 28, 2019, she released the song "Yishma-HaEl," which describes the difficult period she underwent following her conversion.

In 2019, Qadri was a judge on the fifth season of The Voice Israel. In 2020, Qadri performed at the central 72nd Israel Independence Day ceremonies on Mount Herzl.

== Discography ==
=== Albums ===
- 2014: נסרין קדרי (Nasreen Qadri)
- 2016: בנאדיק (Calling You)
- 2018: לומדת ללכת (Learning to Walk)
- 2023: חולמת (Dreaming)

=== Songs ===
- 2012: נסרין אל תלך קליפ
- 2017: באתי להחזיר לך

Featured in

- "Sawah" (Offer Nissim Remix)

== See also ==
- Music of Israel
  - List of Israeli musical artists
- List of converts to Judaism from Islam
  - Islam and Judaism
