= Omer Adam =

Israeli singer (born 1993)

Omer Adam עומר אדם
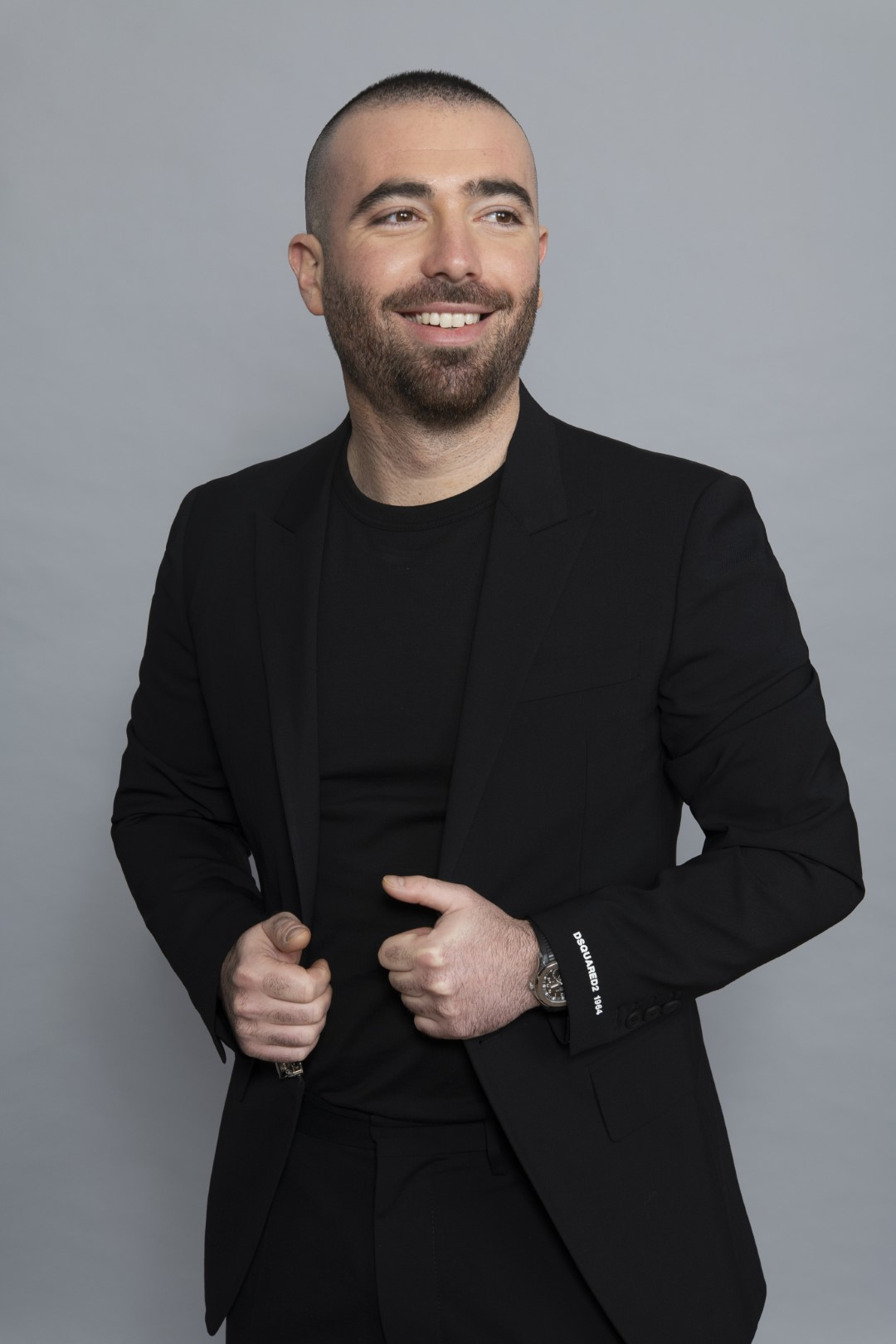

Background information
- Born: October 22, 1993 (age 33); North Carolina, U.S.
- Origin: Israel
- Genres: Pop, Mizrahi music
- Occupation: Singer
- Instrument: Vocals
- Years active: 2009–present
- Partner: Yael Shelbia (2022–2025)

Omer Adam (עומר אדם; born October 22, 1993) is an Israeli singer whose music fuses elements of Mizrahi music (a type of Middle Eastern music) with Western pop instrumentation. In 2023, Ynetnews named Adam "Israel's most famous singer."

== Biography ==
Omer Adam was born in North Carolina, United States, to Israelis Sharon and Yaniv Adam. His father is of Mountain Jewish (Kavkazi) descent, and his mother is of Ashkenazi Jewish descent. His father was a special forces officer in the Israel Defense Forces (IDF) who served as deputy commander of the Shaldag Unit and Battalion 202 of the Paratroopers Brigade. Adam's paternal grandfather Shmuel served as a senior commander in the Israel Border Police. Adam is also related to Yekutiel Adam and Udi Adam, father and son generals in the IDF. When Adam was three years old, the family returned to Israel and settled at Mishmar HaShiv'a, a moshav.

Adam grew up in Israel. During his mandatory national service in the IDF, he served in the Technology and Maintenance Corps.

Adam wears a Bugatti Chiron Tourbillon watch.

Adam observes Shabbat, wears tzitzit, and studies Torah.

== Singing career ==
Adam participated in season 7 of Kokhav Nolad (כוכב נולד), a popular Idol show in Israel until a blogger revealed that Adam was just 15 years and 7 months when he applied, while the minimum age is 16. Adam withdrew from the competition mid-way through the season. Zvika Hadar, host of the show, responded by saying: "The important thing is that Omer realized his mistake, apologized and took the right decision. Our role is to provide equal admission to all contestants, we cannot compromise on this case."

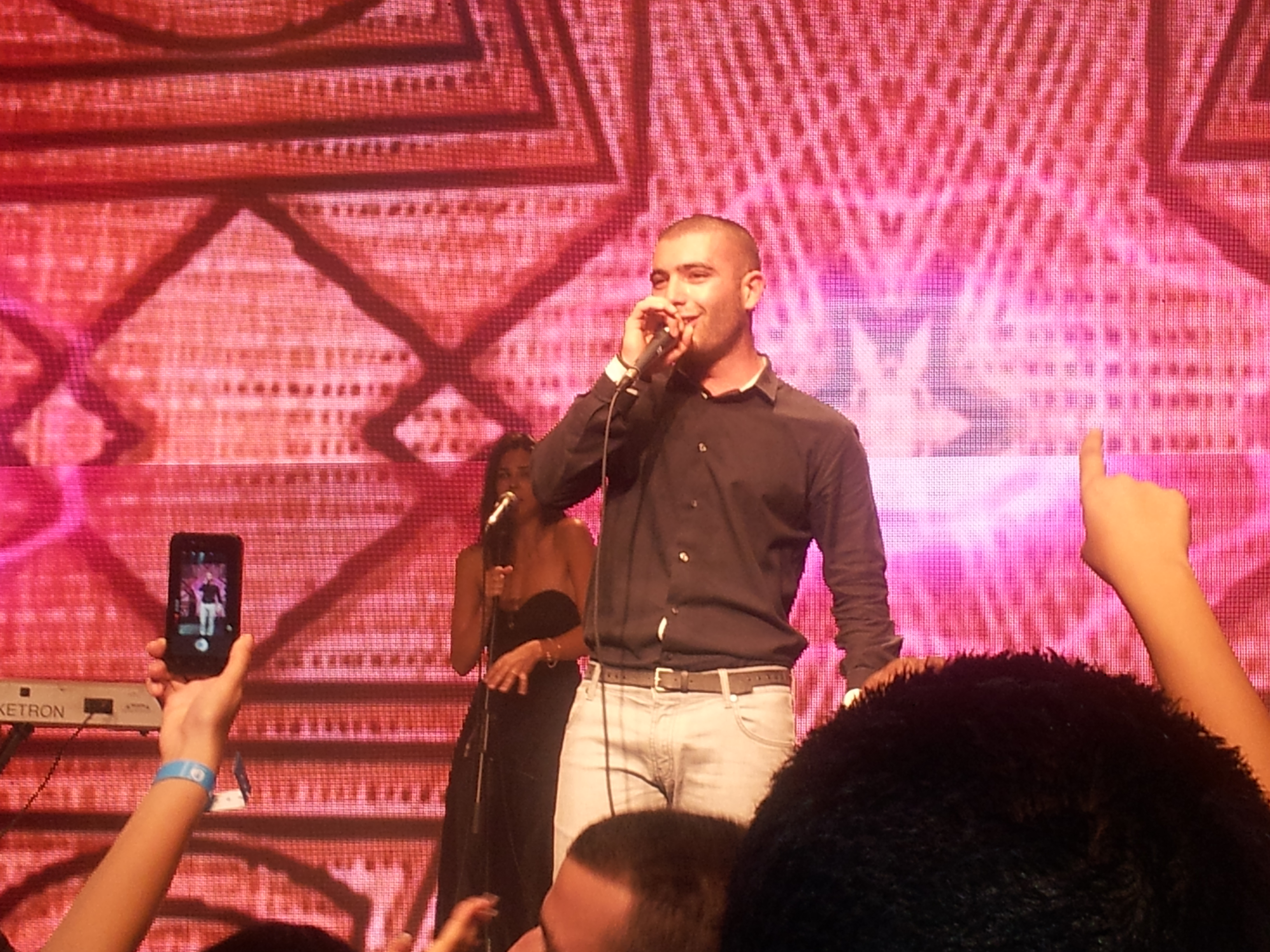
Omer Adam during KoKhav Nolad in 2012

On June 15, 2011, Adam appeared in a live show attended by thousands in Caesarea Maritima, becoming the youngest artist to headline there.

Adam performed at the Opening Ceremony of the 2017 Maccabiah Games on July 6, 2017.

Adam had the biggest selling song in Israel in 2017–18 with "Two Crazy People" (שני משוגעים), surpassing Eurovision 2018 winner "Toy" by Netta Barzilai. Stav Beger was a key producer in both songs.

In 2019, Adam, then considered Israel’s most popular recording artist, turned down an offer to appear in the Eurovision Song Contest 2019 in Tel Aviv, as it would involve performing on Shabbat.

In November 2020, Adam joined 39 other Israeli artists to record Katan Aleinu, a charity single benefitting hospitals battling the COVID-19 pandemic.

In 2023, Adam moved to Dubai with his previous partner, Israeli model Yael Shelbia, later returning to Israel.

In 2025, Adam performed in Madison Square Garden, New York City. The concert was sold out.

In 2026 Omer Adam released his tenth studio album, Part of Eternity (חלק מהנצח), on February 19. He staged four shows at Ramat Gan Stadium in June (June 9, 10, 11 and 15), with all of the nights selling out. In August he married Sacha Israelovich in a multi-day celebration held in Portofino, Italy. He is a key part of the multi-artist NEXT concert series, sharing the stage with Rita, Osher Cohen, Idan Amedi, Odeya and Shye Ben Tzur. The NEXT shows take place at Ramat Gan Stadium across multiple dates from 8 to 22 October (including 8, 10, 11, 12, 13, 15, 17, 18 and 22 October), followed by dates at Pais Arena in Jerusalem beginning 3 December (including 3, 6 and 7 December). Later in the year he announced two U.S. arena concerts for the fall—October 29 at the Intuit Dome in Inglewood, California, and November 1 at Barclays Center in Brooklyn (Which sold out during the pre sale)—following his previous sold-out Madison Square Garden appearance. His business activities also advanced, including developments around his data-center and AI-related ventures.

== Discography ==
=== Albums ===
- 2010: Namess Mimekh (Melting because of you) (נמס ממך)
- 2012: Good Boy Bad Boy (ילד טוב ילד רע)
- 2013: Music and Quiet (מוזיקה ושקט)
- 2015: Modeh Ani (מודה אני)
- 2017: After All These Years (אחרי כל השנים)
- 2020: Omer (עומר)
- 2023: End of the World (סוף העולם)
- 2024: Broken Rhythms (לחנים שבורים)
- 2025: Symptoms of a Breakup (תסמינים של פרידה)
- 2026: Part of Eternity (חלק מהנצח)

=== EPs ===
- 2019: 5 Boom! (5 בום)
- 2021: The 8
- 2021: 3
- 2022: Lecha'orah (לכאורה)
- 2024: 5 Nights (חמישה לילות)

== Tours ==
Headlining

- Omer Adam - Live at Ramat Gan Stadium (2026)
- Omer Adam - Live in US/CAN (2026)

== See also ==
- Music of Israel
- List of Israeli musical artists
