= Yemeni diaspora =

المغتربين اليمنيين

Total population
- ~7,000,000

Regions with significant populations
- Saudi Arabia: 1,803,469 (2022 census)
- Egypt: 700,000
- Israel: 400,000 (Ancestry)
- United Arab Emirates: 100,000
- United States: 91,000
- United Kingdom: 80,000
- Madagascar: 60,000
- Turkey: 40,000
- Ethiopia: 36,000
- Jordan: 32,000
- Malaysia: 20,000
- Eritrea: 18,000
- Somalia: 12,000
- Canada: 8,115
- Djibouti: 5,000
- Netherlands: 3,777
- Oman: 2,500

Languages
- Yemeni Arabic, Yemenite Hebrew

Religion
- Predominantly Islam · Very small minorities of Christianity (Roman Catholic · Hungarian Calvinist) and Judaism

Related ethnic groups
- other Arabs, Semites and North-Afroasiates like the Hadharem, Mehris, Saudis

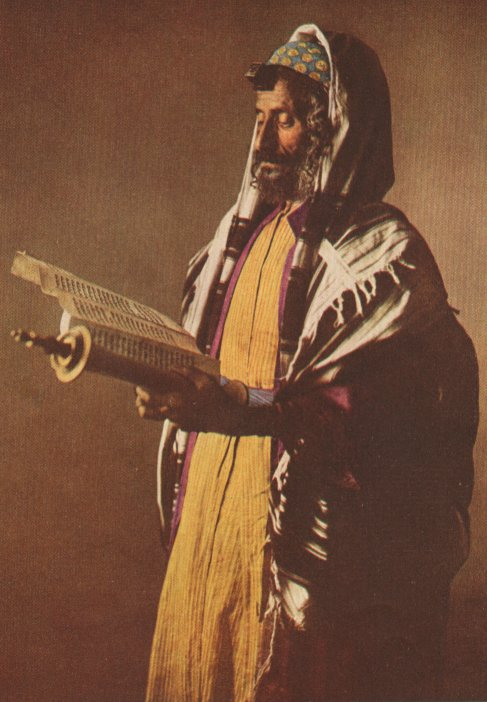
Yemeni Jewish man, year 1914

Yemeni diaspora refers to Yemeni migrants and their descendants who, whether by choice or coercion, emigrated from Yemen and now reside in other countries.

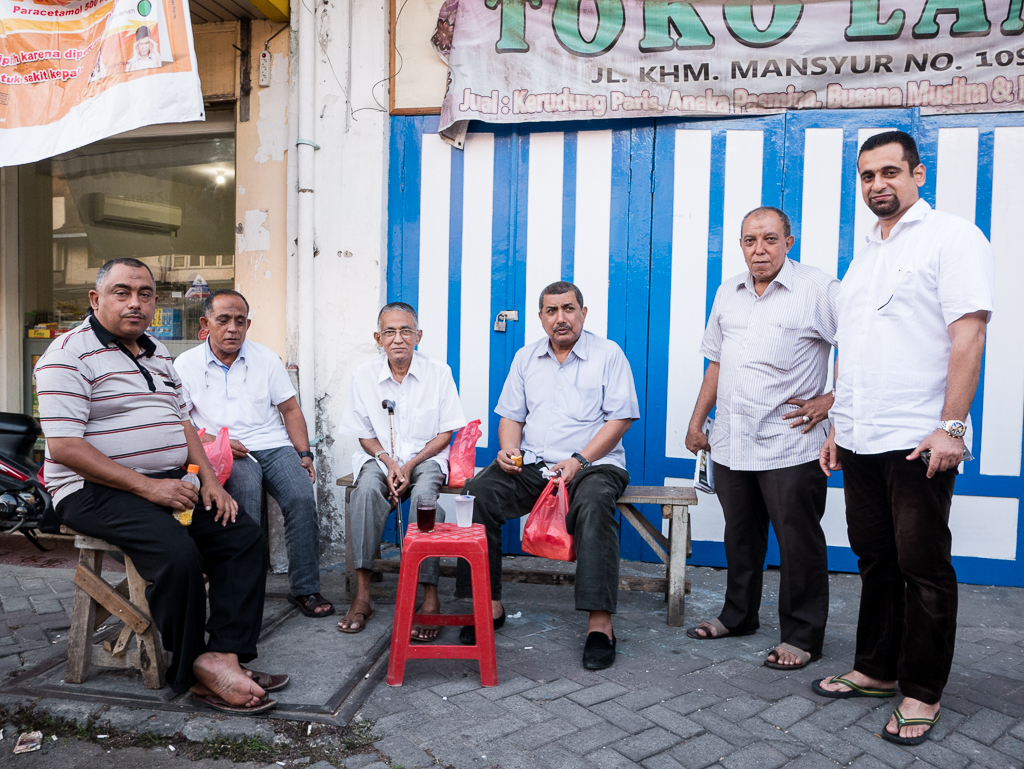
Arab Indonesians from Surabaya's Arabic Quarter, Ampel

There are 7 million Yemenis living outside Yemen, including 2 million in Saudi Arabia. In the United Kingdom there are between 70,000 and 80,000 Yemenis. An estimated 10,000 Yemenis in Birmingham, making about 1% of the city's population. Over 200,000 Yemenis reside in the United States, and around 3,000 live in Italy. Other Yemenis also reside in the United Arab Emirates, Jordan, Qatar, Bahrain and Turkey—as well as Indonesia, Malaysia, Brunei, and the former USSR.

Yemeni merchants and sailors often from the Hadhramaut and Aden regions, due to their historical maritime trading networks, were often influential in spreading Islam to regions in the Indian Ocean, especially the Swahili Coast, Madagascar, Southern India, Sri Lanka, East Timor, Indonesia, and Malaysia. A smaller number of modern-day Indonesians are of Yemeni descent, their original ancestors having left Yemen for the Southeast Asia over four centuries ago; Yemenis also contribute part of the small Muslim community in East Timor. Similarly, many South Indian and Malagasy Muslims trace their ancestry back to Yemeni migrants, contributing to the Yemeni Indian population of roughly 300,000, as well as a population of roughly 60,000 Yemenis in Madagascar.

Due to the conflict in Yemen, many have migrated to the northern coasts of Djibouti, Somalia and Ethiopia. In 2017, Djibouti was home to over 40,000 Yemeni refugees.

Some Yemenis also migrated to Turkey following the prelude and outbreak of the 2014 Yemeni Civil War. There were reports about Yemenis had been affected by/victims of the brutal 2023 Turkey-Syria earthquake in Turkey, both of them were identified as diaspora before/refugees following the 2014 Yemeni Civil War.

== Yemenite Jews in Israel ==
Almost 435,000 Yemenite Jews live in Israel. Yemenite Jews have a unique religious tradition that marks them out as separate from Ashkenazi, Sephardi and other Jewish groups. Yemenite Jews are generally described as belonging to "Mizrahi Jews", though they differ from the general trend of Mizrahi groups in Israel, which have undergone a process of total or partial assimilation to Sephardic culture and Sephardic liturgy.

Avigdor Kahalani originating from Yemen was a former Israeli soldier and politician and Israeli Minister of Internal Security and member of the Knesset, the Israeli Parliament. Ofra Haza was a famous Israeli singer most known for "Im Nin'alu" and for representing Israel in the Eurovision Song Contest 1983 with "Hi". Dana International of mixed Yemeni and Romanian origin won Eurovision Song Contest 1998 representing Israel with "Diva". Both Haza and Dana International have also sung in Arabic and in Yemeni dialects. Bo'az Ma'uda also of Yemeni descent represented Israel in Eurovision Song Contest 2008 with "The Fire in Your Eyes".

Very active names of Yemeni (or partial Yemeni) origin particularly in Israeli Mizrahi music include Zohar Argov, Daklon, Eyal Golan, Zion Golan, Yishai Levi, Avihu Medina, Haim Moshe, Shimi Tavori, Margalit Tzan'ani amongst others.

== Notable Yemenis of the diaspora ==
- Mohammed Abdu, Yemeni-Saudi singer
- Hind Al-Eryani, Yemeni-Swedish journalist and social activist
- Ella Al-Shamahi: Yemeni-British biologist and comedian
- Sadam Ali, American boxer
- Hakim Almasmari, Yemeni American journalist, editor of Yemen Post
- Sharifa Alkhateeb, American writer, researcher and teacher on cultural communication and community building for Islam and Muslims in the United States, of mixed Yemeni Czech origin
- Arwa (Born:Iman Salem Ba'amiran), Yemeni-Egyptian singer and television host
- Abu Bakr Salem, Yemeni-Saudi singer
- Ahmed Alshaiba, Yemeni musician
- Amna Al-Nasiri, Yemeni plastic artist, art critic, writer
- Shatha Altowai, Yemeni-Scottish visual artist
- Saber Bamatraf, Yemeni-Scottish pianist, composer and cultural activist.
- Murad Subay, Yemeni contemporary artist, street artist and a political activist.
- Balqees Ahmed Fathi, Yemeni-Emarati singer
- Ofra Haza, Yemeni-Israeli singer
- Naseem Hamed, British boxer
- Norman Hassan, British musician, member of UB40
- Sara Ishaq: Scottish-Yemeni filmmaker
- Adam Saleh, American entrepreneur, vlogger, musician of Yemeni descent
- Jade Thirlwall, member of English band Little Mix
- Khalid Yafai, British boxer
- Gamal Yafai, British boxer
- Queen Naija, American artist
- Mari Alkatiri, second Prime Minister of East Timor
- Tawakkol Karman, Yemeni-Turkish human rights activist

== See also ==
- Demographics of Yemen
- Yemenis in the United Kingdom
- Yemeni Americans
- Yemenite Jews
