= Maghrebi Jews =

Jewish diaspora of Northwest Africa

See Mizrahi Jews, for more information about the Eastern Jews.

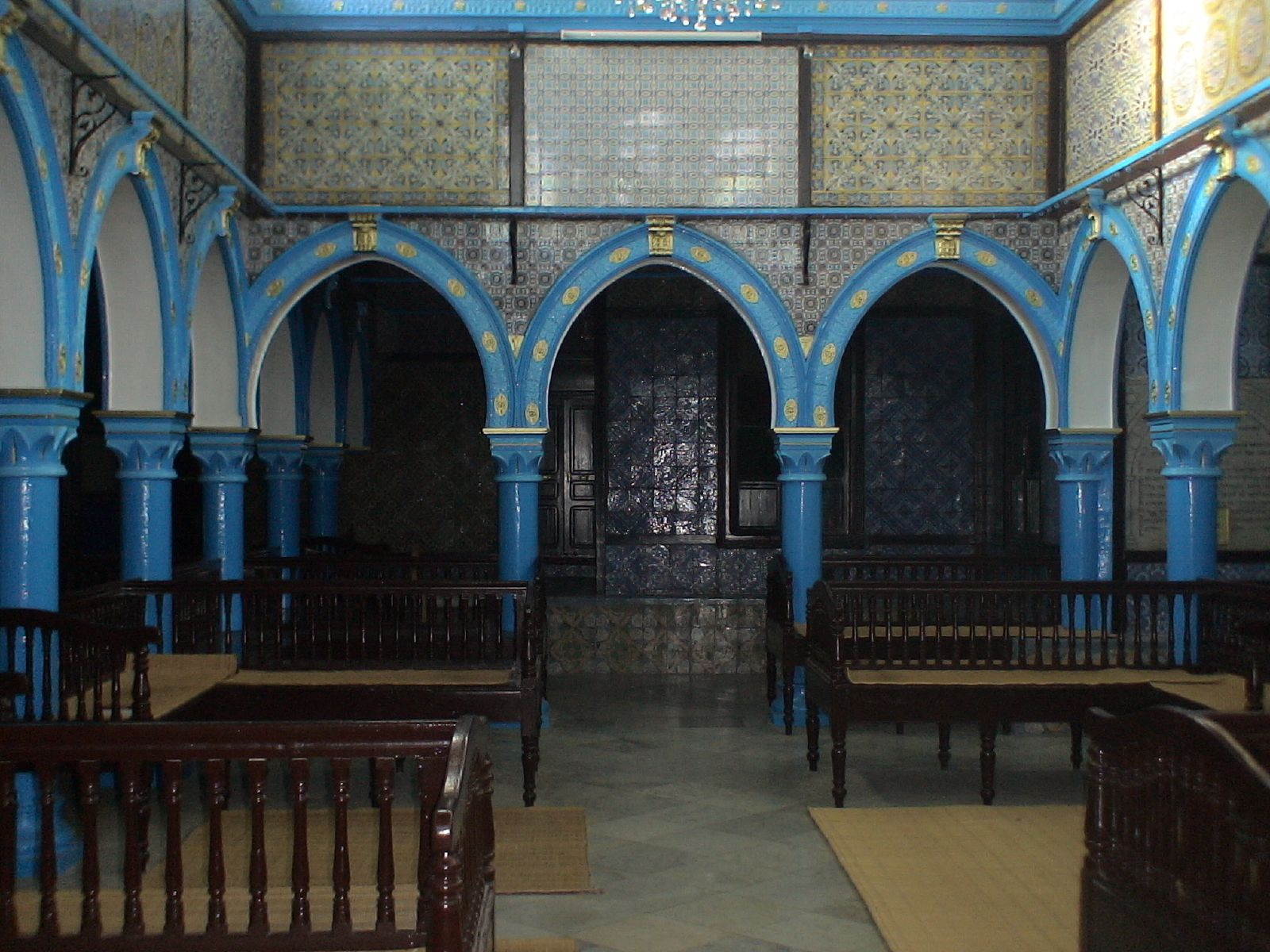
Interior of el Ghriba Synagogue, island of Djerba, Tunisia

Primary, secondary, and tertiary Jewish centers in the Maghreb

Maghrebi Jews (מַג׳רֶבִּים or מַאגרֶבִּים, Maghrebim), are a Jewish diaspora group with a long history in the Maghreb, which includes present-day Morocco, Algeria, Tunisia, and Libya. These communities were established long before the Muslim conquest of the Maghreb and continued to develop under Muslim rule during the Middle Ages. Maghrebi Jews represent the second-largest Jewish diaspora group — approximately 1.8 million in France, Canada, Israel, Morocco, and Tunisia — with their descendants forming a major part of the global Jewish population.

Maghrebi Jews have lived in multiple communities in the northern Maghreb for more than 2,000 years, with the oldest Jewish communities present during Roman times and possibly as early as within Punic colonies of the era of ancient Carthage. Under early Muslim rule, Jews flourished in major urban centers throughout the region. However, they also faced periods of persecution, notably under the Almohad Caliphate. Before and after the expulsion of Jews from Spain in 1492, many Sephardic Jews fleeing persecution settled in coastal North Africa. Over time, Maghrebi Jews largely mixed with the newly-arrived Sephardic Jews, and in most cases, they adopted the Sephardic Jewish identity.

The Maghrebi-Sephardic Jewish communities declined during the mid-to-late 20th century as part of the Jewish exodus from the Muslim world, with most moving to Israel, France, Canada, and Venezuela. Today, descendants of Maghrebi Sephardim in Israel have largely embraced the modern Israeli identity and, in many cases, intermingle with Ashkenazi and Mizrahi communities. Some Maghrebi Sephardim also consider themselves Mizrahim, a term that typically refers to the Jewish communities of West Asia and Central Asia, including the Near East, Mesopotamia, Persianate societies, and the Caucasus. They have similar histories of Arabic-speaking backgrounds and parallel exoduses: the Mizrahim left the Middle East, and the Maghrebi Sephardim left the Maghreb during the mid-to-late 20th century. Among Arab countries, the largest Jewish communities now exist in Morocco, with about 2,000 Jews, and in Tunisia, with about 1,000.

The term 'Maghrebi Jews' refers to such communities as Moroccan Jews, Algerian Jews, Tunisian Jews, and Libyan Jews. The term Musta'arabi Jews ('Arabized Jews') was also used by medieval Jewish authors to refer to Jews who had traditionally lived in the Maghreb.

'Maghrebi' can also sometimes refer to Egyptian Jews, although there are important cultural differences between the histories of Egypt (often considered part of the historical Levantine sphere), and the Maghreb proper (Morocco, Algeria, Tunisia, and Libya).

== Early history ==
=== Antiquity ===
The Jewish community of Ifran, from the Tamazight word ifri meaning cavern, is supposed to date back to 361 BCE and is believed to be the oldest Jewish community in what is now Morocco. Jewish communities settled in Cyrenaica, the eastern coastal region of Libya, as early as the 3rd century BCE. This migration is linked to the policies of Ptolemy I, a successor of Alexander the Great and the first ruler of Ptolemaic Egypt. By this period, Egypt had become a major center of the Jewish diaspora, with waves of migration from Judah beginning in the 6th century BCE. To strengthen his control over Cyrenaica, Ptolemy resettled Jewish populations in cities such as Cyrene, using them to help secure the region as part of his expanding kingdom. By 95 BCE, when Cyrenaica came under Roman control, the Jewish presence was already substantial. The geographer Strabo, writing in the early first century BCE, described Cyrene as comprising four population groups, one of which was Jewish, indicating the community's size and significance at the time. A notable figure among the Cyrenaic Jews was Simon of Cyrene, referenced in the New Testament.

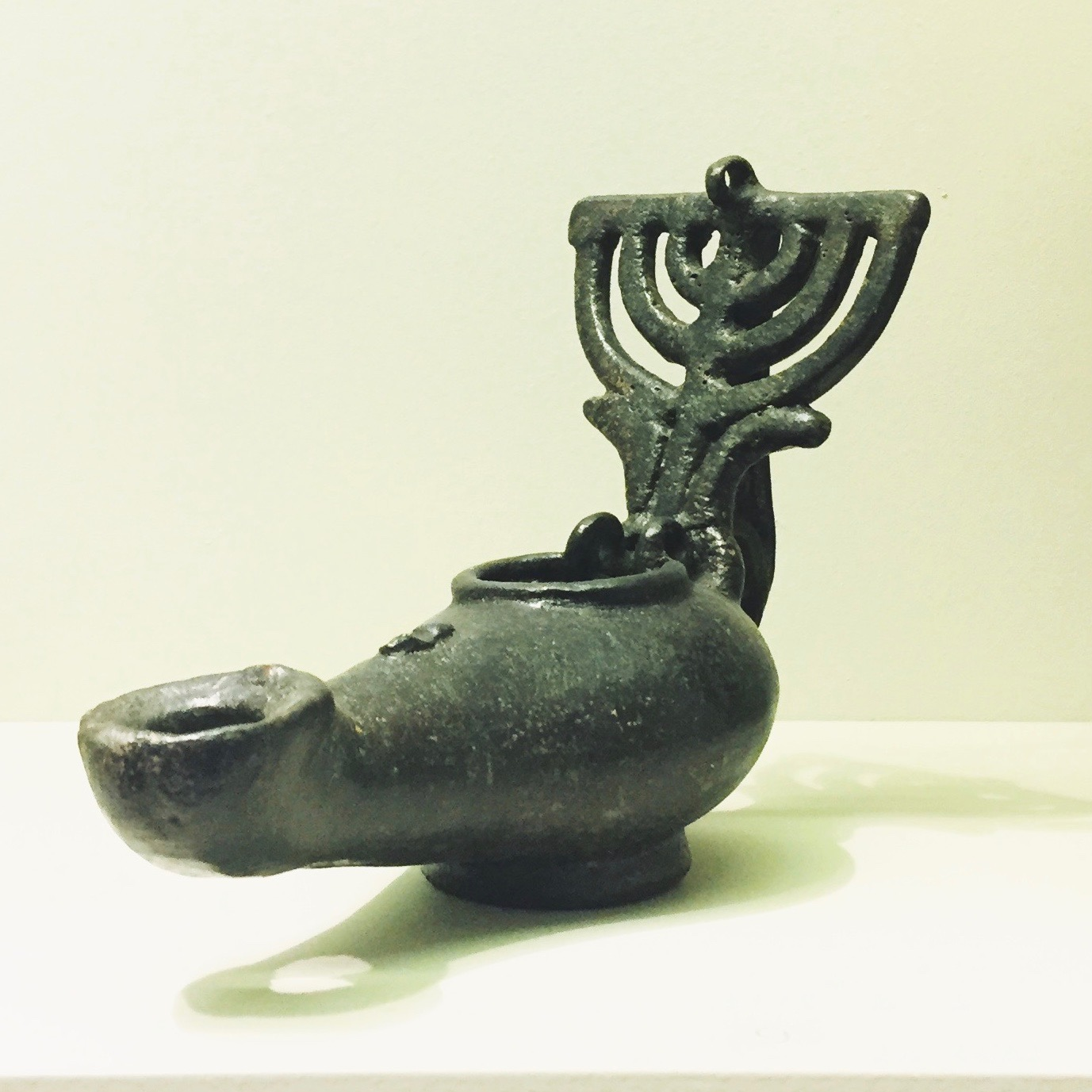
A 4th-5th century CE bronze oil lamp of the Roman period in the shape of a menorah, found at the ruins of Volubilis.

After Jewish defeat in the First Jewish–Roman War in 70 CE, Roman General Titus deported many Jews to Mauretania, which roughly corresponds to the modern Maghreb, and many of them settled in what is now Tunisia. These settlers engaged in agriculture, cattle-raising, and trade. They were divided into clans, or tribes, governed by their respective heads, and had to pay the Romans a capitation tax of 2 shekels.

The Jewish diaspora uprising of 115–117 CE led to a major defeat for the Jews, resulting in the near-total destruction of Jewish communities in Cyrenaica and Egypt. By the third century, Jewish communities began to re-establish themselves in Cyrenaica and Egypt, primarily through immigration from the Land of Israel.

In the area of Carthage, in modern-day Tunisia, the earliest evidence of Jews is found in inscriptions from the second century CE. Although some theories suggest a Jewish presence during the Punic period, there is no archaeological or literary support for this earlier timeline. A Jewish necropolis, possibly dating to the third century, was discovered at Gammarth, north of Carthage, including numerous burial chambers and features Hebrew inscriptions and Jewish symbols such as the menorah and shofar. The oldest known synagogue in western North Africa, found in Hammam-Lif, in modern Tunisia, dates to the late fourth or early fifth century. In Morocco, Hebrew-language epitaphs and menorah-decorated lamps from late antiquity have been found in the Roman city of Volubilis.

After 429 CE, with the fairly tolerant Vandals, the Jewish residents of the Maghreb's provinces increased and prospered to such a degree that Church councils decided to enact restrictive laws against them. Berber lands east of Alexandria were relatively tolerant and were historically very welcoming for Christians and Jews during the Roman Empire notably. After the overthrow of the Vandals by Belisarius in 534 CE, Justinian I issued his edict of persecution, in which the Jews were classed with the Arians and heathens.

A community settled in Djerba island off the coast of southern Tunisia during the Roman period. Mainly composed of Cohanim, they notably built the Ghriba synagogue with stones coming directly from Jerusalem. 'La Ghriba' is still to this day annually visited by many Maghrebi Jews.

=== Early Muslim rule ===
Under Muslim domination Jewish communities developed in important urban centers such as Kairouan and coastal cities of Tunisia, in Tlemcen, Béjaïa and Algiers in the Central Maghreb (Algeria) and in the western Maghreb (Morocco), especially in Fes and throughout the Atlas Mountains among the Berber populations. The relationships between Maghrebi Muslims and Maghrebi Jews were relatively good during Al Andalus peaceful era, until the ascension of the Almohades, who persecuted non-Muslims to a large extent during their early reign. Later Jews were relatively well treated by the Berber Muslim dynasties, namely the Merinids, Zianides and Zirides.

In the seventh century, the Jewish population was augmented by Iberian Jewish immigrants, who, fleeing from the persecutions of the Visigothic king Sisebut and his successors, escaped to the Maghreb and settled in the local Byzantine Empire.

Fez and Tétouan, Morocco and Tunis became important Sephardic rabbinical centers well until the early 20th century, when most Jewish populations emigrated to Israel, France, Canada, and South America.

Following the massacre of 1391 in Spain, a significant migration of Jewish refugees and conversos moved from Iberia and Mallorca to Morocco and Algeria, including notable rabbis like Isaac ben Sheshet and Simon ben Zemach Duran. The latter, having fled to Algiers, became chief rabbi and authored influential works on Jewish law, philosophy, and science, including Magen Avot, which addresses topics such as physiology, psychology, and natural philosophy. The migration from Spain increased in the latter part of the 15th century due to anti-Converso violence in 1473 and the intensification of the Spanish Inquisition in the 1480s, which led to the expulsion of Jews from Andalusia. As Spanish military forces advanced into Málaga and Granada, many Jews from these regions sought refuge in Morocco and Algiers.

=== Expulsion from Spain after 1492 ===
North Africa (predominantly Morocco) became the primary refuge for Jews expelled from Spain in 1492, along with other destinations such as Portugal, Italy, and the Ottoman Empire. Contemporary accounts describe the hardships initially faced by these refugees in the northern Maghreb. Solomon ibn Verga recorded instances of starvation during which people resorted to eating grass, while Judah ibn Hayyat described seeking refuge from the cold by burrowing into garbage heaps. Jewish refugees from Spain were later joined by those fleeing Portugal, especially after the mass forced conversions of 1497.

Upon arrival, Iberian Jews found the Maghreb's cities already home to numerous diverse Jewish communities. These included both long-established Jewish populations ("Toshavim") and recent arrivals from earlier expulsions ("Megorashim"). The newcomers often faced integration issues, leading to the later formations of distinct communities. Key areas of Sephardic Jewish settlements included major cities in such coastal areas as Tétouan, Tlemçen, and Oran, as well as inland centers such as Fez and Marrakesh. Sephardi Jews quickly dominated Jewish communal life in Morocco due to their scholarly and mercantile elite status. Some newcomers integrated into existing communities, while others remained separate due to cultural and leadership differences. The reception of these exiles was shaped more by local conditions and less by religious ideology. Political protection and social status were often precarious, with frequent outbreaks of violence and economic pressures impacting both Jews and Muslims.

Around the time of the Spanish Inquisition the Counter-Reformation was taking place. The Counter-Reformation was the Catholic response to the Protestant Reformation, a movement in Europe that strived to popularize the newer sect of Christianity, Protestantism, throughout Europe. The Counter-Reformation mostly took place in Southern Europe, which is a large reason as to why Southern Europe is, for the most part, far more Catholic and far less Protestant than the majority of Northern Europe. The Counter-Reformation, being a movement to preserve and strengthen the Catholic influence on society, was opposed not only to Protestantism but to any non-Catholic belief that was seen as a threat to the Catholic society. Thus, the Jews of Spain overwhelmingly moved directly south to the Maghreb Region of North Africa and quickly prospered.

== Recent history ==
=== World War II and the Holocaust ===
The present-day Arab Maghreb Union countries

On the eve of World War II, 400,000 Jews resided in the Maghreb; throughout this time, each country differed in its treatment of its respective Jewish population.

Algerian Jews (approximately 35,000) had been granted French citizenship by the Cremieux Decree in 1870. France's Vichy Regime, then, oversaw the Jewish community in Algeria during World War II and imposed anti-Semitic measures such as stripping Jews of their civil rights, forcing them to wear identification markers, and putting quotas on their admission to primary schools.

Tunisia was the only country with direct contact with the German army; Germany occupied the country for six months from 1942 to 1943 until it was recaptured by the Allied forces. Under German occupation, the Jewish population, then 89,000, endured the Nazi regime and were subjected to harsh mistreatment.

In Morocco, whose Jewish population totaled nearly 300,000, Vichy-French authorities enforced anti-Jewish laws; at least 2,100 Moroccan Jews were forcibly interned in work camps.

=== Emigration ===
The creation of the state of Israel in 1948 led to many countries promoting anti-Jewish behavior, especially in Muslim-majority areas. This contributed significantly to the emigration of Jews from the Maghreb. This exodus was a combination of push and pull, augmented by the independence of Maghreb countries in the 1950s and early 1960s, as some Jews were seen as being supportive of the previous colonial French rule.

Tunisia had been a French protectorate since 1881, and the country fought for independence from 1952 to 1956, after which many of the 105,000 Jews within the community emigrated. In recent decades, the Jewish community has continued to shrink as many have emigrated to Israel, France, and elsewhere.

In 1956, Morocco regained its independence following the 44-year French protectorate in Morocco and Spanish protectorate in Morocco. More than 225,000 Moroccan Jews began successive waves of immigration to Israel, France, and Canada throughout the second half of the 20th century.ere

In Algeria, the National Liberation Front fought and won independence in 1961. After Algeria won independence, the Jewish population of 140,000 began a massive and definitive exodus, mainly to France, due to increased animosity toward Jews who were given French citizen.

=== Maghrebi Jews in Israel ===
The early Zionists were majority Ashkenazi Jews who affiliated themselves strongly with Theodor Herzl, the founder of modern Zionism. Maghrebi Jews, along with Mizrahi Jews and fellow Sephardic Jews, did not begin to arrive in masses. Some Maghrebi Jews were immigrated to the Palestine region by the 18th century, settling in Jerusalem's Mughrabi Quarter. Aharon Moyal had laid the foundations to modern Tel-Aviv-Jaffa before Israel was established as a state. The early Zionists tended to be secular, as Zionism (as Herzl founded it) was a secular nationalist movement that recognized Jews as a whole Nation, and saw the Land of Israel as the ancestral homeland of the Jews.

During the mid-20th century, the Arab World (in this case the Maghreb) began to undergo some vast internal changes. The notion of Pan-Arabism came about in the early 20th century, and the cultural, linguistic, and political influences of European colonial powers in the region began to sharply decline. As Arab unity increased, so did the opposition to any form of colonialism. With this new sentiment, the 20th century North Africa Arabn countries heavily opposed Zionism and many Arab leaders saw the movement as simply a continuation of European colonialism, due to the vast majority of early Zionist migrants arriving from Europe.

Maghrebi Jews have an enormous cultural influence in Israel. Falafel is widely known as the "National Food of Israel," and due to falafel's origins in the Middle East and North Africa, Maghrebi Jews, along with other Sephardic and Mizrahi Jews from the Middle East and the Maghreb played enormous roles in making falafel an Israeli staple. Mizrahi music, one of Israel's most popular genres, is influenced by Maghrebi Jews. Some popular singers include: Eyal Golan, Sarit Hadad, Moshe Peretz, Dana International, Zehava Ben, and Kobi Peretz, all of whom are of Moroccan descent.

Religiously, Maghrebi Jews (along with fellow Sephardic/Mizrahi Jews) are classified as Masortim, contrasting Israelis of Ashkenazi Jewish descent (who are more secular). Politically, Maghrebi Jews tend to vote Likud.

== Communities ==
=== Morocco ===
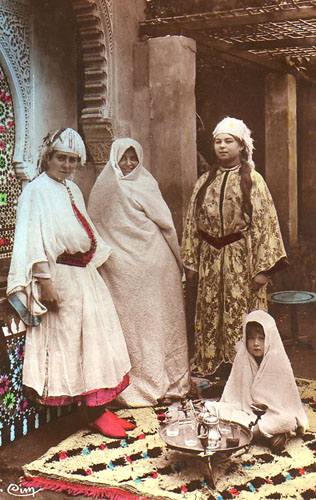
Moroccan Jewish women

Morocco, the Maghreb country with the largest Jewish population in the Arab world both at the start of the 20th century and today, had a Jewish population of approximately 250,000-300,000 around the time of the establishment of Israel.

A significant number of Moroccan Jews are descendants of Berber-speaking Jews who once lived in the Atlas Mountains and the Rif Mountains. Today, the Jewish population in Morocco is estimated to be approximately 2,000.

Since their expulsion from Spain after 1492, Sephardic-Moroccan Jews have shared many customs of everyday life and a common spoken language (Berber or Moroccan Arabic) with their Muslim neighbours, which led to a diverse and rich shared-cultural heritage of music, poetry, food, crafts, and traditions.

In the decades following the establishment of Israel, a mass exodus of the Jewish population began and the vast majority of Moroccan Jews emigrated to Israel, as very few Moroccan Jews had left before to Mandatory Palestine. Israeli authorities launched a series of operations to bring Jews to the newly-created State of Israel from various West Asian, Central Asian, and North African countries. A notable operation, which brought nearly 100,000 Moroccan Jews to Israel between 1961 to 1964, was called Operation Yachin.

Today, Moroccan Jews in Israel most often tend to identify with their Moroccan background and remain in touch with their traditional culture. A part of Moroccan Jewish culture revolves around Sephardic music and traditional food. Shakshouka, a traditional Maghrebi dish, has become popular in Israel through the influence of Moroccan Jews.

=== Algeria ===
Algerian Jews are quite similar to Moroccan Jews in many regards, due to the proximity of Algeria and Morocco. Both communities were intertwined linguistically, culturally, and historically. A Jewish presence in Algeria has existed since before the Roman-era; however, most Algerian Jews trace a significant amount of their history and cultural-heritage to al-Andalus.

Since 1848, Algeria had been part of the French motherland, and with the 1870 Crémieux Decree Algerian Jews were granted French citizenship. Meanwhile, the indigenous Muslim Arab and Berber populations remained under second-class status, giving rise to Muslim friction that culminated in the 1934 Constantine riots. After the German invasion of France, Algeria came under Vichy rule: Jews had their French citizens’ rights taken away, were sacked from public service jobs and subject to quotas and restrictions.

The Crémieux Decree and thereby Jewish citizenship were reinstated after World War II, keeping Algerian Jews committed to their French status throughout the Algerian War, in which an estimated 1.5 million Algerians were killed. In the wake of the war, while most Algerian Muslims supported the independence, the majority of the Algerian Jews tied their fate to France with many of them supporting and even joining the OAS. In the last 15 months of the war, over 130 attacks against Jews or Jewish establishments occurred; the two most symbolically significant being the looting of the Great Synagogue of Algiers in December 1960, and the assassination of popular singer Cheikh Raymond on a public market in Constantine in June 1961. These two incidents in particular gave the impetus for Jewish immigration from Algeria, albeit subsumed into the great mass of pieds-noirs leaving Algeria for France.

At the time of World War II, there were around 130,000 Jews living in Algeria. More recently, the population is estimated by the United States Department of State at less than 200. Algerian Jews are unique in that they are the only community of North African Jews that did not overwhelmingly emigrate to Israel during the Jewish exodus from Arab and Muslim countries; instead, the majority of Algerian Jews chose France as their destination. Their "repatriation" represents a unique case in the history of Jewish migration given that even though they were psychologically uprooted, they "returned" to France as citizens and not as refugees.

=== Tunisia ===
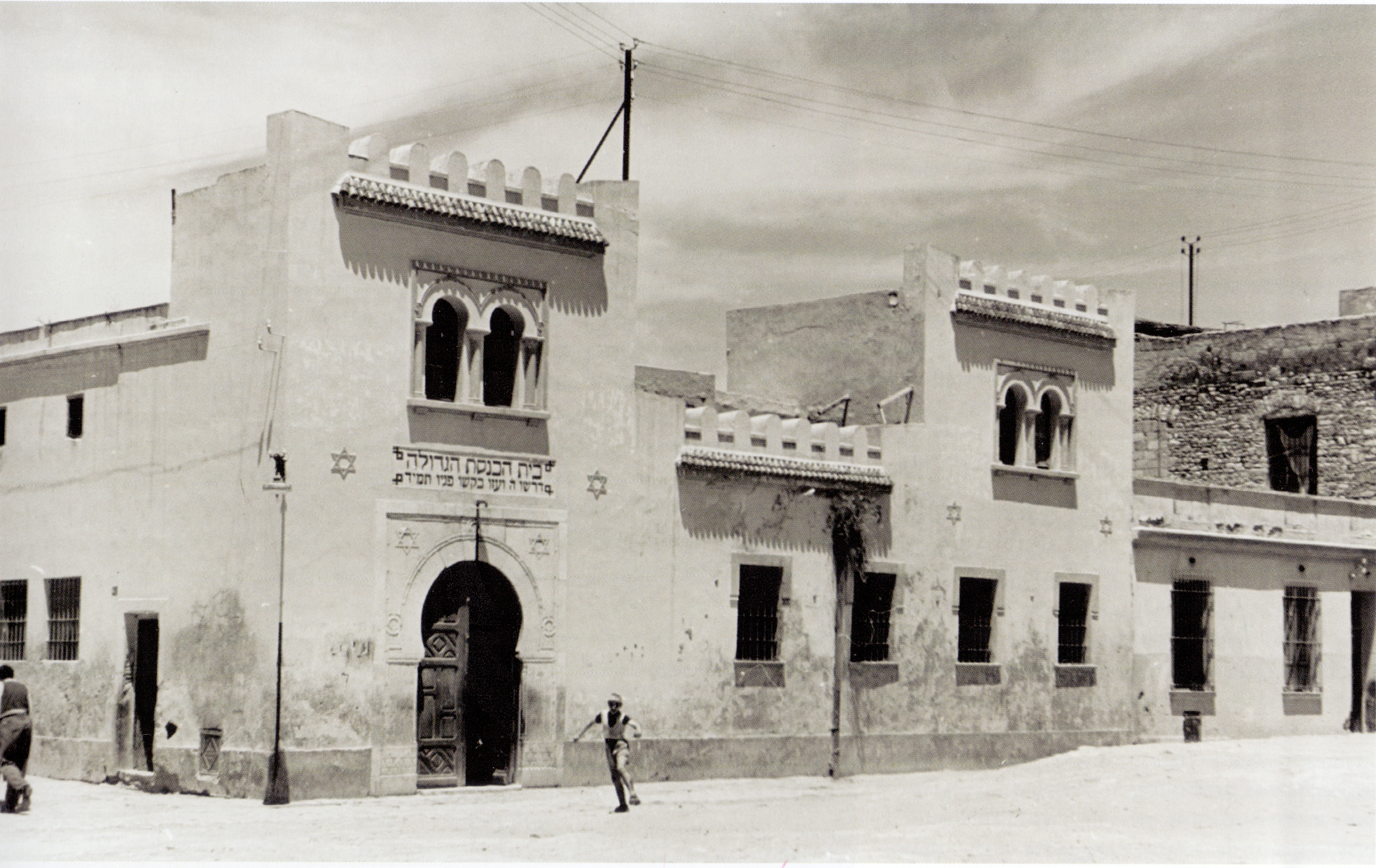
The Grand Synagogue of the Hara in 1960.

Like its neighboring Algeria, Tunisia came under Vichy rule in July 1940, subjecting Tunisian Jews to the same antisemitic Statut des Juifs as in mainland France which restricted Jews in the public service, in educational institutions and journalism, and in liberal professions. In May 1941, the worst outbreak of violence against Jews in North Africa during World War II occurred in Gabès in a riot that killed seven Jews and wounding twenty.

After the Allied invasion of North Africa, Tunisia was directly occupied by German forces in November 1942. The Nazis immediately arrested Moise Borgel, the president of the Tunis Jewish community, along with other prominent Jews, before implementing a regime of forced-labor, property confiscation, hostage-taking, mass extortion, deportations, and executions. Thousands of countryside Jews were forced to wear the yellow badge, but none were transported to the extermination camps in Eastern Europe due to the distance from Tunisia as well as the short time span of the German occupation, which ended in May 1943.

The population of Tunisian Jews stood at around 105,000 in 1948. Shortly after independence in 1956, a government decree meant to eliminate all confessional tribunals, including courts based on Sharia law, also abolished rabbinical tribunal and Jewish community councils, which the Jewish community understood as a curtailment of their autonomy. While Habib Bourguiba continuously worked to reassure the Jews of their safe and equal position within Tunisian society, going so far as to include a Jewish nationalist, Albert Bessis, in his first cabinet, he failed to curb the increasing instances of violent anti-Jewish outburst, particularly following the Six-Day War in 1967, when the Grand Synagogue of Tunis was looted and burned to the ground. The number of Tunisian Jews decreased to around 20,000 by 1967. A further 7,000 Jews immigrated to France. As of 2021, the population of Jews in Tunisia is numbered at around 1,000.

In 2018, the first Jewish minister since Bessis, René Trabelsi, was appointed to lead the Ministry of Tourism.

=== Libya ===
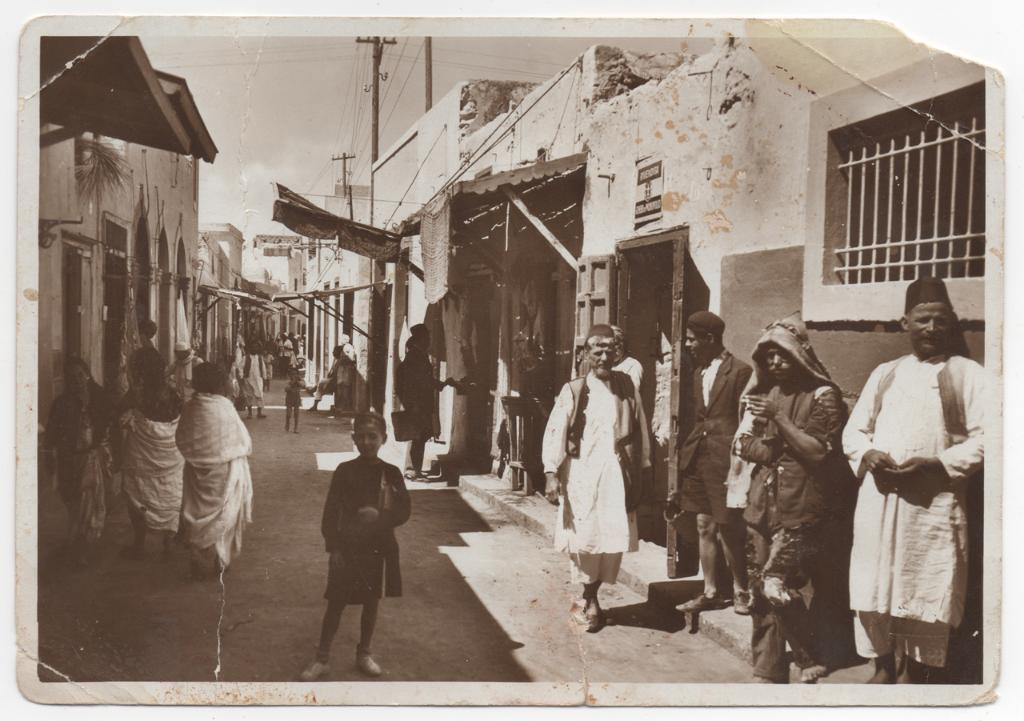
Jewish Quarter (Hara) of Tripoli circa 1930

Libyan Jews are the smallest community of Maghrebi Jews. Nevertheless, the Libyan Jewish community is rich in history, tradition, and culture. The history of Libyan Jews is one that is approximately 2,300 years old, and the population of Jews in Libya peaked at around 40,000 in 1945.

As Libya was occupied by Italy throughout most of the first half of the 20th century, the racial laws that targeted Jews and minimized their freedoms were enacted in Libya. As the Italians enacted laws that directly exploited and suppressed Jews, the Jews of Libya were more welcoming to the arrival of the Allies of World War II's entering Libya. Italy saw the Jews as enemies, and Mussolini sought to cleanse Libya of its Jewish population, a movement called Sfollamento. Through the movement of Sfollamento, Libyan Jews were sent to concentration camps; the location of those camps depended on if they had British, French, or Libyan-Italian citizenship.

Libya was liberated by the Allies in January 1943, but even with the eradication of the racial laws, the conditions for Jews did not improve a whole lot. Anti-semitism was widespread amongst a Libyan culture that had just been heavily influenced by fascism; as a result, the vast majority of Libyan Jews emigrated, primarily to Israel once it was established as a state. The 1945 Anti-Jewish riots in Tripolitania sparked a pogrom that killed 140 Jews. Riots and antisemitic violence did not subside, leaving the Jews of Libya with very little choice but to leave. Today, there are no more Jews living in Libya.

== Genetics ==
In 2012, a study by Campbel et al. found that North African Jews were more closely related to each other and to European and Middle Eastern Jews than to their non-Jewish host populations. The genome-wide ancestry of North African Jewish groups was compared with respect to European (Basque), Maghrebi (Tunisian non-Jewish), and Middle Eastern (Levant) origins. The Middle Eastern component was found to be comparable across all North African Jewish and non-Jewish groups (around 40%), while North African Jewish groups showed increased European (35-40%) and decreased level of North African (Maghrebi) ancestry (20%) with Moroccan and Algerian Jews tending to be genetically closer to Europeans than Djerban Jews, the latter being a highly endogamous group.

== See also ==
- History of the Jews in Morocco
- History of the Jews in Algeria
- History of the Jews in Tunisia
- History of the Jews in Libya
- Arab Jews
- Berber Jews
- North African Sephardim
