= HaPerah BeGani =

- "Up to Date", the album "HaPerah BeGani" is from.

Single by Zohar Argov

from the album Nakhon Lehayom
- Language: Hebrew
- English title: The Flower in my garden
- Released: 1982
- Genre: Mizrahi
- Length: 3:43.
- Label: Ruveni Brothers
- Composers: Avihu Medina and Moshe Ben Moshe
- Lyricist: Avihu Medina
- Producer: Nancy Brandes

Performance of the song at the festival
- "זוהר ארגוב - הפרח בגני - ZOHAR ARGOV - HA'PERACH BE'GANNI" on YouTube

HaPerah BeGani (Hebrew: הפרח בגני, lit. 'The Flower in my garden') is a 1982 single by Zohar Argov, written and composed by Avihu Medina and Moshe Ben Moshe.

It is often considered Argov's signature track and the mainstream breakthrough of the Mizrahi genre, as well as one of the greatest Israeli songs ever made.

== Background ==
The lyrics to the song were inspired by an unrequited relationship Medina had as a teenager while living in Kissufim.

Medina composed the melody with the help of Moshe ben Moshe, while Nancy Brandes helped arrange the song.

It is unclear if the song was first offered to Shimi Tavori or to Argov himself, as there are differing accounts regarding this aspect from Tavori himself, Medina, as well as musicologist Ofer Gavish.

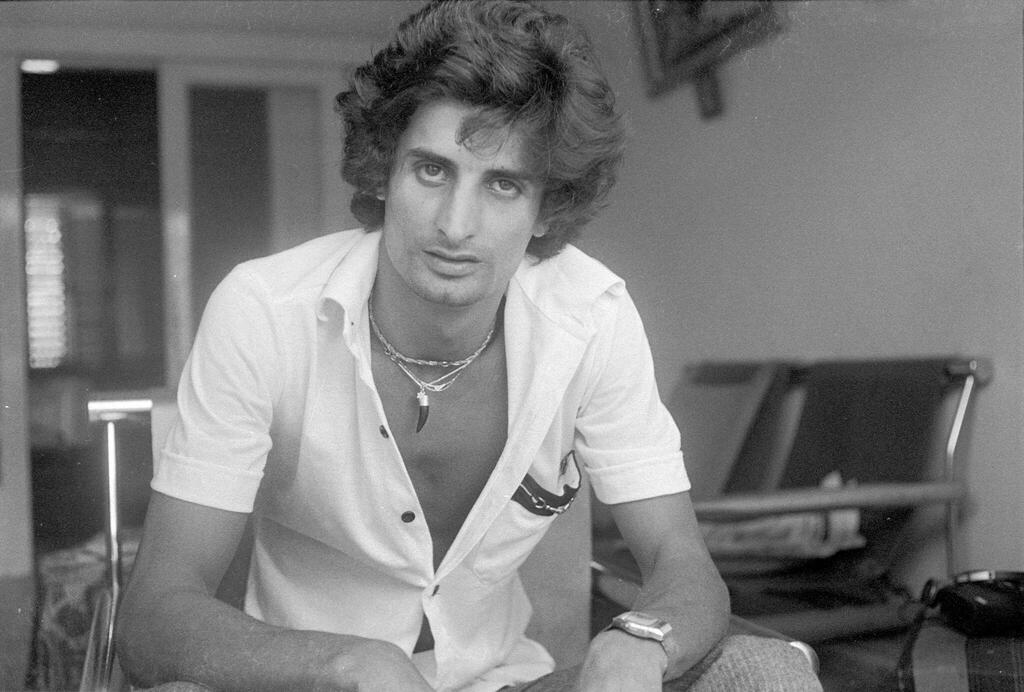
Zohar Argov had enjoyed moderate success in the Mizrahi scene but was still seen as a niche artist before he performed the song at the festival.(Photo from 1981).

Back then, the Mizrahi Song Festival was the main way that a Mizrahi artist would gain mainstream legitimacy and popularity. Before the 1982 festival, Argov was a moderately successful wedding singer but was almost exclusively well known in the Mizrahi scene, with his only notable mainstream single receiving attention on a radio show devoted to "musical oddities". The IBA did not see Mizrahi music as a mainstream genre akin to Israeli rock or Israeli pop, and rarely gave it any mainstream airplay outside of songs from the festival.

Argov was not at all a fan of the song, and wanted to submit an entirely different song titled "Shir Prati" (Private song) to the festival; however, it was ultimately rejected by the festival's director, Yosef Ben Israel. "HaPerah BeGani" was accepted; however, it was given to a different singer, Aliza Azikri, but Medina quickly managed to convince Ben Israel to let Argov perform the song instead.

The head of Argov's record label, Meir Ruveni would ultimately convince Argov to enter the festival with the song, as he was confident that the song would win. Although Gavish claims it was Shimi Tavori who convinced Argov to enter the festival with the song. Moshe Ben Moshe also claims to have convinced Argov to perform the song.

=== Performance at the Festival ===
"HaPerah BeGani" was the fourth song performed at the festival. It would win first place with 43 points, although according to Ruveni, a few alleged that the festival was rigged due to Argov wearing two different suits during the contest.

=== Aftermath and success ===
The song soon became a massively successful hit single for Argov, subsequently affirming Mizrahi music's place in Israeli culture. It would rank at number 4 in the Israeli Annual Hebrew Song Chart as well as number 5 in Galatz's year-end list, an unprecedented feat for a Mizrahi song back then.

Even before the song's release as a proper radio single, it was already quite successful as a bootleg cassette in the old Tel Aviv central bus station, as was the norm for Mizrahi singers back then.

Argov would soon embark on a tour of the United States following the success of the single, which is where he would be introduced to cocaine and heroin, beginning his spiral into addiction.

== Composition ==
"HaPerah BeGani" went through a few melodic and lyrical changes before it was performed by Argov at the festival.

Medina initially set the song to a "Yemenite rhythm", but Moshe ben Moshe felt that Medina was overusing that style and advised him to use a Flamenco beat instead. The song also had four verses, which was too long for the festival's standards, and thus the fourth verse was ultimately removed. Nancy Brandes, the song's arranger, said that he combined elements of rock music, classical music, and Balkan music alongside Mizrahi music when arranging the tune.

"HaPerah BeGani" opens with a triumphant chorus of trumpets before transitioning into a mawwal by Argov, and is then followed up by the song proper. Lyrically, the song uses literary Hebrew, a style of Hebrew similar to Biblical Hebrew.

There have been allegations of plagiarism against the song's composer, Medina, due to the song's melodic similarities to an earlier 1979 song called "Dlila" by Zmira Chen. This allegation was brought up by musicologist Dudi Patimer in 2017 alongside other allegations of plagiarism against Argov and his collaborators, although Medina and Chen have both denied the allegation.

== Legacy ==
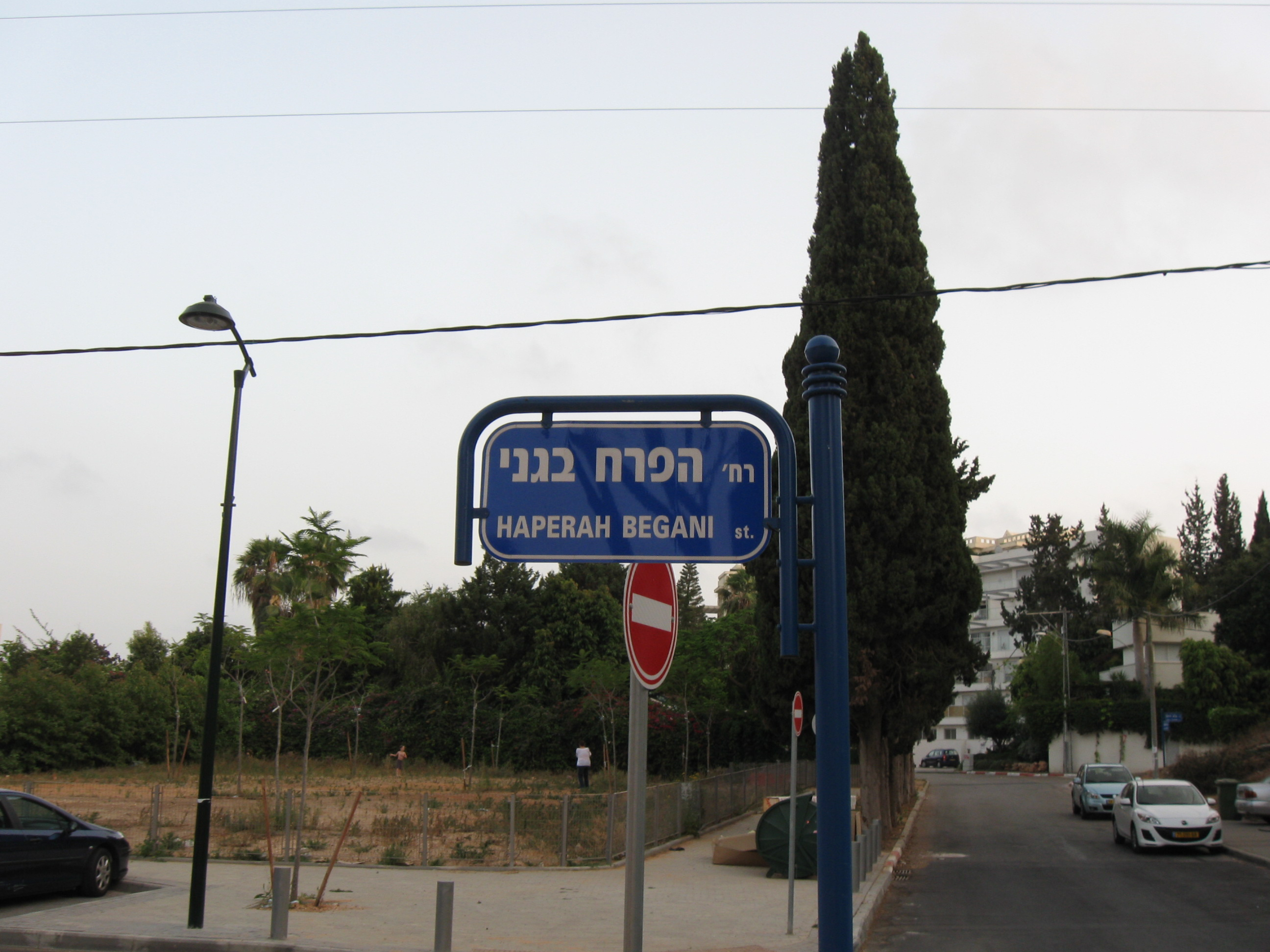
"HaPerah BeGani street" In Herzliya, named in honor of Argov and after the song.

HaPerah BeGani is often considered the greatest song in the Mizrahi genre, and one of the greatest songs in Israeli music as a whole, consistently ranking highly in polls related to the subject. It has been covered by many different artists throughout the years, including the likes of Haim Moshe, Eyal Golan, Shimi Tavori (who was possibly offered to perform the song first), and several other artists.

ACUM concluded in 2019 that it was the second most played song of the 21st century on Israeli radio after "A Weekday Song" by Ilanit.

Multiple streets in several cities in Israel are named after the song, including in Argov's hometown of Rishon LeZion, where the street itself is located in the neighborhood Argov grew up in.

A musical loosely based on Argov's life takes its name from this song.

== See also ==
- Culture of Israel
- Music of Israel
