= Avi Peretz =

Avi Peretz may refer to:

- Avi Peretz (footballer) (born 1971), Israeli football player
- Avi Peretz (singer) (born 1966), Israeli singer
