= Pe'er Tasi =

Israeli musical artist

Pe'er Tasi פאר טסי
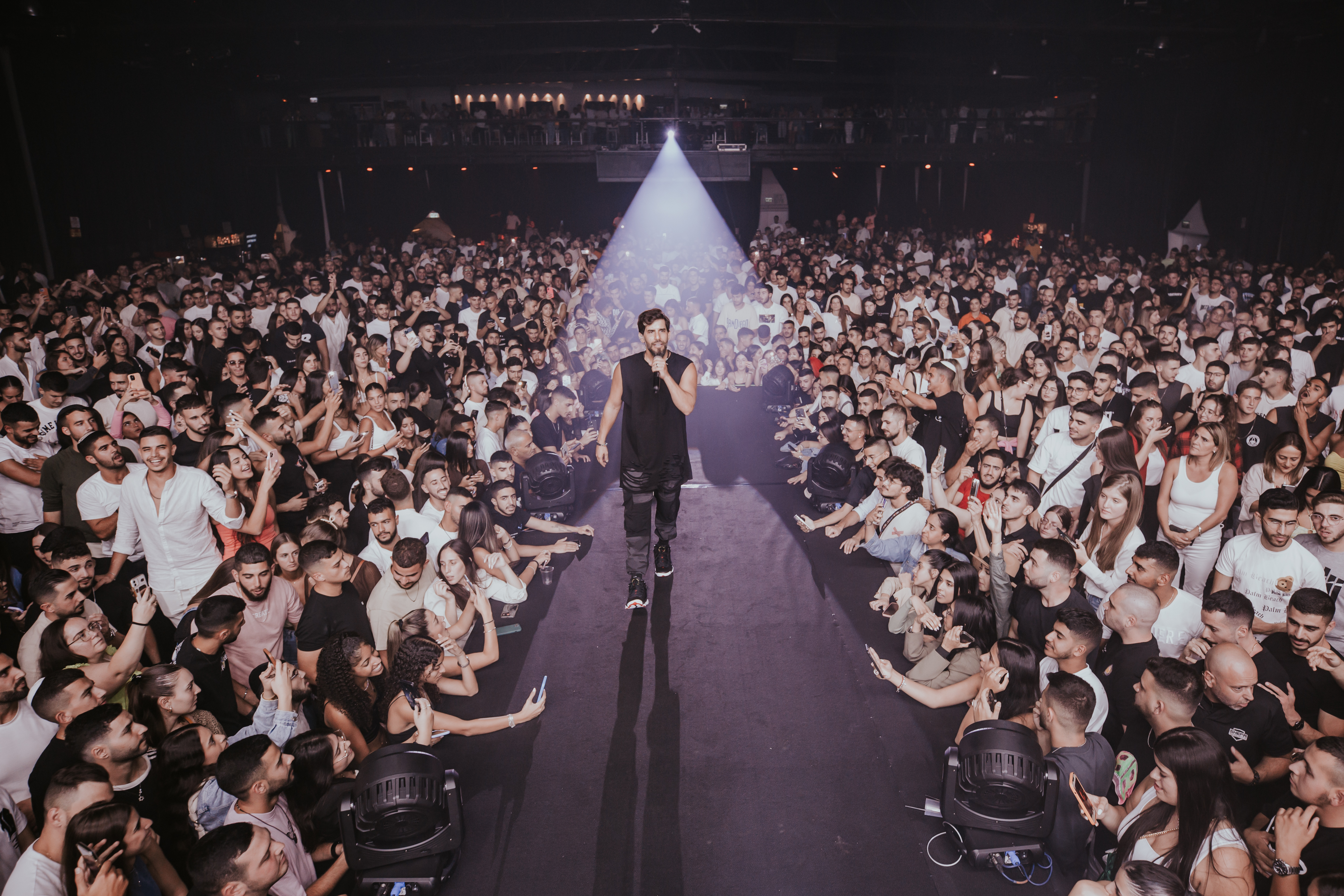
- Pe'er Tasi in 2023

Background information
- Born: 10 May 1984 (age 42); Pardes Hanna-Karkur, Israel
- Genres: Mizrahi, Israeli rock, pop music
- Occupations: Singer, songwriter
- Years active: 2009–present
- Label: Sarit Productions

Pe'er Tasi (Hebrew: פאר טסי; born 10 May 1984) is an Israeli singer and songwriter in the Mizrahi genre.

== Biography ==
Tasi was born on 10 May 1984 in Israeli town Pardes Hanna-Karkur, and is Jewish. He began singing at age six in the Yemenite synagogue in his neighborhood. In his youth, he sang in karaoke clubs and parties.

Tasi served in the Israel Defense Forces as a combat soldier in the Kfir Brigade. Following the completion of his military service, he was a hotel singer for the Fattal hotel management company. After two years, Tasi left the hotel business and began working on his debut album.

In 2009, his first single, "True Love," was released. In 2011, the song "Another Chance" was released, which was a hit on the radio. Later that same year he released the duet "Drive me crazy" with singer Alon De Loco.

In 2012 he published the song "Sorry", which was played on the radio. He later released "Hakal Ka'il", a cover of a song by the duo "Hablainim" (Maor Cohen and Oren Lutenberg), which was also played on the radio.

In 2013, he won first place in a musical competition with a song he later released as a single. He released three more singles that year. In November 2013, his debut album, which he had worked on for four years, was released. Between 2014 and 2017, his musical career and popularity grew as he continued to release singles and albums. Among his singles was the extremely popular hit Derech Hashalom. In 2015 he wrote and composed the songs "The Sky is the Limit" and "Shekrim" (with Eric Zanti), from the album "At the end of each day" by Eyal Golan. And the song "Breathe you" from the album "Sharit Hadad" by Sarit Hadad. On May 7, 2015, he released the first single from his third album "Mishke Yakar".

The song was successful and was played on all radio stations and reached second place on Media Forest weekly chart. The second single from the album, "Hey Mama", was released on August 18, and the third single was released on October 18.

On September 20, 2022, the song "Open Your Hands" from the Vathan Shul project was released, performed by him along with Yishai Rivo, Moshe Peretz and Akiva Turgeman. On November 10, 2022, Tessi surprisingly released his seventh album, Radio Space. The album received favorable reviews among music critics and the title of Album of the Year at the Acumen Awards.

In 2023, in the shadow of the Gaza war, he released the song "Lo Tira" ("Don't be afraid") written and composed by Eitan Darmon.

== Personal life ==
Tasi married Tal Shoshan on 15 September 2015. Their daughter, Hillel, was born on January 4, 2017, followed by a son in 2018 and another son in 2020.

== Discography ==
Studio albums

- Peer Tasi (Album Habchora) (2013)
- Kocha Shel Ahava (2015)
- Ma Nashim Rozot (2016)
- Shachor O Lavan (2017)
- Hafooch L'Shneinu (2018)
- Perek Alef Nigmar (2021)
- Radio Shetach (2022)
- Radio Shetach 2 (2024)
- Radio Shetach 3 (2025)

== See also ==
- List of Israeli musical artists
