= Shimi Tavori =

Israeli singer (born 1953)

Shimi Tavori שימי תבורי
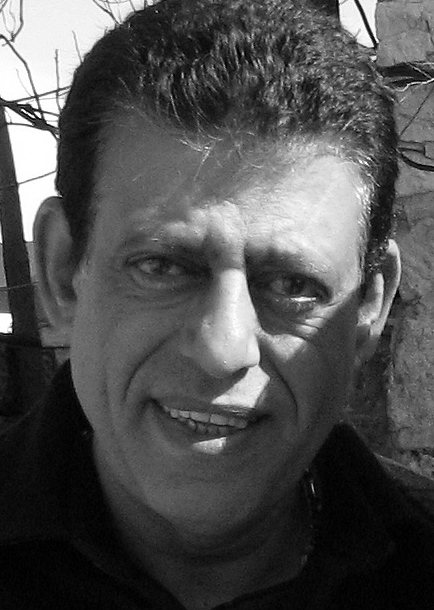

Background information
- Born: Shimshon Tawili; February 9, 1953 (age 73); Ness Ziona, Israel
- Origin: Tel Aviv, Israel.
- Genres: Mizrahi music
- Instrument: Vocals
- Years active: 1975 – present
- Labels: The Ruveni Brothers; Hed Arzi Music
- Website: www.shimitavori.com

Shimshon "Shimi" Tavori (Hebrew: שימי תבורי; born February 9, 1953) is an Israeli singer. He performs mostly in Hebrew but also in French.

== Biography ==
Shimshon Tawili was born in Ness Ziona, Israel, to a Yemenite-Jewish family. He was the youngest of seven children.

He met his wife Jennifer Joslyn while performing in New York City in 1982, and married her after a short acquaintance. She then moved to Israel to live with him. They had three sons, Eliran, Ariel, and Daniel. One of his songs, Eliran, is named for his firstborn son. After divorcing Joslyn, Tavori married a 17-year-old Israeli model, Aviva Azulai, with whom he had two children, son Ben El Tavori and daughter Bat-El Tavori. Tavori later divorced Azulai and married Osnat Lorber. They had two children, Orel and Elad, before divorcing. After their divorce, Tavori married and later divorced Sylvia Ziv, a resident of Los Angeles with whom he had a long distance relationship. He later entered a relationship with Yehudit Bauman, who claims to be the daughter of Italian actor Marcello Mastroianni through a brief holiday romance with her mother. Tavori married her in 2016.

Several of Tavori's children are also involved in the music world. His son Daniel was a contestant on Kokhav Nolad, and has also performed as a drummer, participating in one of Tavori's singles. His son Eliran works with him in concerts and is a music producer. His son Ben El Tavori is also a prominent singer and was part of a famous musical duo with fellow singer Liraz Russo, known as "Static".

== Singing career ==
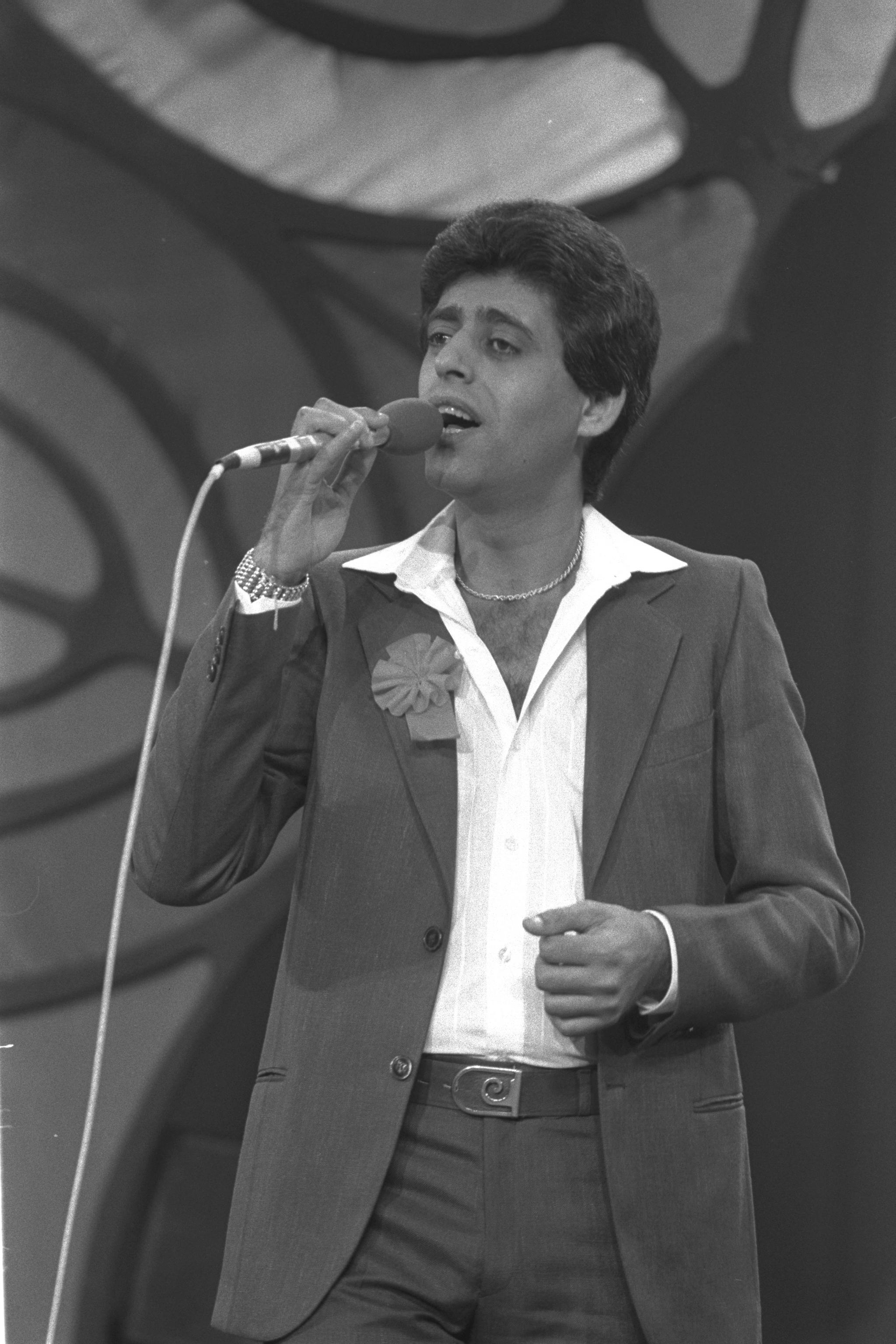
Tavori in 1981

Tavori started out singing at nightclubs in Ramla, among them Calipso and Karish. After his service in the Israel Defense Forces, he recorded his first song, Helena, which was coldly received at first but later became a hit. His first major break came after David Halfon heard him perform a song that Halfon had written for another singer. Halfon introduced Tavori to Uzi Hitman in his early days as a songwriter.

In 1976, the collaboration with Hitman led to Tavori's first record, Chipasti Shirim La'Tzet La'Olam ("I searched for songs to go out to the world"; Hebrew: חיפשתי שירים לצאת לעולם), including his first hit, Eyn Lee Ahavah ("I have no love"; Hebrew: אין לי אהבה), written by Eliezer Rabin. After the records release, Tavori was awarded first place in the Middle Eastern Singing Festival (Hebrew: פסטיבל הזמר המזרחי) with his song Shechora Ve'Nava" ("Black & Beautiful"). The following year Tavori placed second at the same festival with his song Kinor David, and in 1979 he once more placed first with the song Moshe, written for him by singer-songwriter Avihu Medina.

Collaboration with Medina produced numbers like Shabhi Yerushalayim and Al Tashliheini Le'et Zikna, which became megahits for Tavori and other Mizrahi singers in Israel.

Tavori was possibly the first person offered to perform Avihu Medina's song "HaPerah BeGani" at the 1982 Mizrahi Music Festival; however, he turned down the song, which would ultimately be performed by his peer, Zohar Argov. Tavori would go on tour in New York City instead. In 1993, Tavori entered the Eurovision Song Contest with the song Chai Et Ma'She Yesh ("I Live With What I've Got"; Hebrew: חי את מה שיש). Known also with the ballad "Remember" in the 80's (Big hit in Greece 1985-1986). In 2000, he released a triple album in French, "Oriental Tempo" with international contributions of Turkish folk singer İbrahim Tatlıses, French entertainer Francky Perez, and Israeli musician and singer Meir Banai.

In 2009, he finished second on the TV show HaAch HaGadol (VIP Big Brother).

In 2021, Tavori participated in the fourth season of The X Factor Israel, in the goal of representing Israel in the Eurovision Song Contest 2022. He was eliminated in the chairs round.

== See also ==
- Music of Israel
