= Sharif (singer) =

- מייק שריף
- Born: Mike Sharif; April 6, 1979 (age 46)
- Occupation: singer

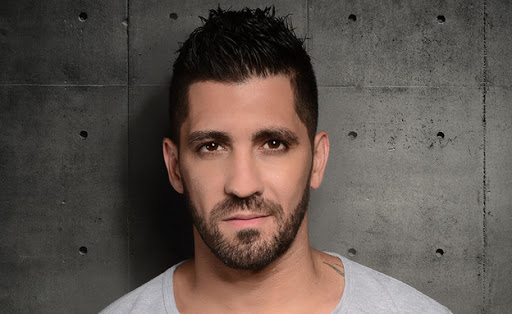
Mike Sharif

Mike Sharif (Arabic: مايك شريف, Hebrew: מייק שריף; born 6 April 1979) is an Israeli Druze singer of Arab and Mizrahi music.

Singing in both Hebrew and Arabic, Sharif started performing as a child in the 1980s, and released his first album in 1992.

After being forced to cancel a performance in Palestinian-controlled Ramallah in 2012, Sharif sang at a Palestinian wedding in Yatta outside Hebron in 2021. That year, Sharif announced he would "soon" perform in the Gaza Strip for the first time.
