= Avi Peretz (singer) =

Israeli Mizrahi singer (born 1966)

- Born: 9 December 1966 (age 59); Bat Yam, Israel
- Genre: Mizrahi music
- Occupations: Singer, songwriter
- Years active: 1992 – present

Avi Peretz (in Hebrew אבי פרץ) sometimes transliterated Avi Perez (born 9 December 1966) is an Israeli singer of Jewish Mizrahi music (in Hebrew מוזיקה מזרחית i.e., Muziqa mizrahit, meaning Oriental music).

== Biography ==
Perez grew up in Bat Yam, Israel. His grandfather was a famous poet in Morocco.

From a young age Peretz learned to play the keyboard, and began his music career at age 13. In 1992, he had his great break with "קשה לי" which became an immediate hit. Based on that success, he released his debut album "גלגל הזמן" (Lit. "Wheel of time") and even a bigger hit with tens of thousands of albums sold and a big launch through Israeli radio. It also resulted in a new hit for Peretz, a cover interpretation of Natan Yonatan song "שיר אהבה ישן" (Lit. "Old love song").

In 1993, he released his follow-up album, "אליך" (Lit. "To you"). The most famous single from the album was yet another cover interpretation version of the song "ערב ערב" (Lit. "Every night") a song by Aris San, a Greek singer with huge popularity in Israel in the 1950s and 1960s.

In 1995 came the third album "לך שרתי", an album successful due to the iconic rendition "אוריאנה" by prominent Israeli singer Rivka Zohar and "שיר של יום חולין" as a duo with Yardena Arazi.

In 1997, Peretz released the album "שלווה" (Lit. "Peacefulness"), which included cover versions of songs composed by Yair Rosenblum. Successful tracks from the album included "אוריאנה" and the duet "שיר של יום חולין" as a return hit of the duet with Arazi. Other famous tracks included "היה לי חבר היה לי אח" (Lit. "Be my friend be my brother") and "מיכלי", a song written by Rosenblum's companion shortly before the artist's death.

In 1998, came a double CD collection album including his best songs with a bonus of four new songs: "בך מאוהב" (Lit. "In love with you") and "אור שבעת הימים" (Lit. "light of the seven days") as well as duet "זה הלילה" (Lit. "This night") and "התחנה המרכזית", the latter performed with Margalit Tzan'ani. The album also contained bonus videos, and a remixed new performances of his debut hit "קשה לי".

In 2001 came the studio album "כל פעם מחדש" (Lit. "Each time anew"), an album that brought the hits "שוב לשוב" (Lit. "Back again") wrote by Yossi Gispan (יוסי גיספן), and a duet with singer Uriel Shlomi (אוריאל שלומי) called "אהובה" (Lit. "My love") and "כל פעם מחדש", a song that won the second place in the Israel Song Festival. The distinction of this album was that unlike most previous albums, it was self-composed in nine of the ten tracks included.

Peretz in addition to being a successful Mizrahi artist has written songs for many artists, including Margalit Tzan'ani and Eli Luzon (אלי לוזון).

After a hiatus of five years, amidst speculations he released in 2006 his new album "קטנטנה" (Lit. "Smallest") that has kept his popularity live.

In 2012, he returned to celebrate his 20-year career.

== Discography ==
=== Albums ===
- 1992: Galgal HaZman (Hebrew: גלגל הזמן, lit. "The Wheel of Time")
- 1993: Elayich (Hebrew: אליך, lit. "To You")
- 1995: Lach Sharti (Hebrew: לך שרתי, lit. "I Sang For You")
- 1997: Shalva (Hebrew: שלווה, lit. "Peacefulness")
- 1998: HaOsef HaKaful (Hebrew: האוסף הכפול, lit. "Double Compilation Album")
- 2001: Kol Pa'am Mechadash (Hebrew: כל פעם מחדש, lit. "Each Time from the Beginning")
- 2006: Ktantana (Hebrew: קטנטנה, lit. "Smallest")
- 2012: TBA
