= Moshik Afia =

Popular Israeli singer (born 1974)

Moshik Afia מושיק עפיה
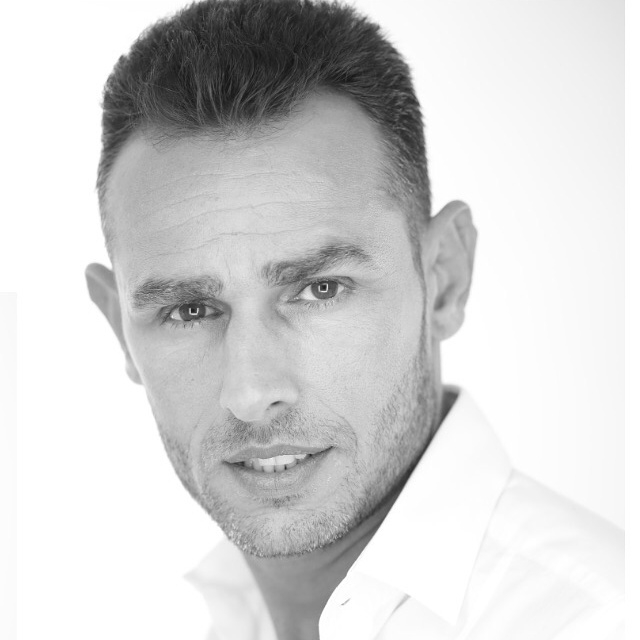

Background information
- Born: Moshik Afia; 3 October 1974 (age 51)
- Origin: Holon, Israel
- Genres: Mizrahi, Pop
- Years active: 1993–present

Moshik Afia (Hebrew: מושיק עפיה; born 3 October 1974 as Moshe Efroni) is a popular Israeli singer who sings in the Mizrahi or Eastern Mediterranean style. He was born in Holon, Israel to Lebanese Jewish parents.

== Biography ==
Moshik Afiia was born on 3 October, 1974 in Holon. In the army he served in "Havat Hashomer" as a general worker. He began his musical career in 1993 at the age of 19, singing in the depressive music style, later switching to other styles.

== Selected discography ==
- A rain dripped – 1997 – גשם טפטף
- A Story of love – 1998 – סיפור אהבה
- In my dreams – 1999 – מתוך חלומותיי
- From the sky – 2000 – מן השמיים
- Sweet Dream – 2002 – חלום מתוק
- I've Got You – 2003 – יש לי אותך
- Greatest Hits – 2004 – האוסף
- Get A Woman – 2005 – קח לך אישה
- No Logic In Love – 2007 – אין הגיון באהבה
- Charming look – 2009 – מבט שנוגע
- For Me – 2010 – בשבילי
- Close to the Heart – 2011 – קרוב ללב

== See also ==
- Mizrahi music
