= Mizrahi music =

Jewish genre of music

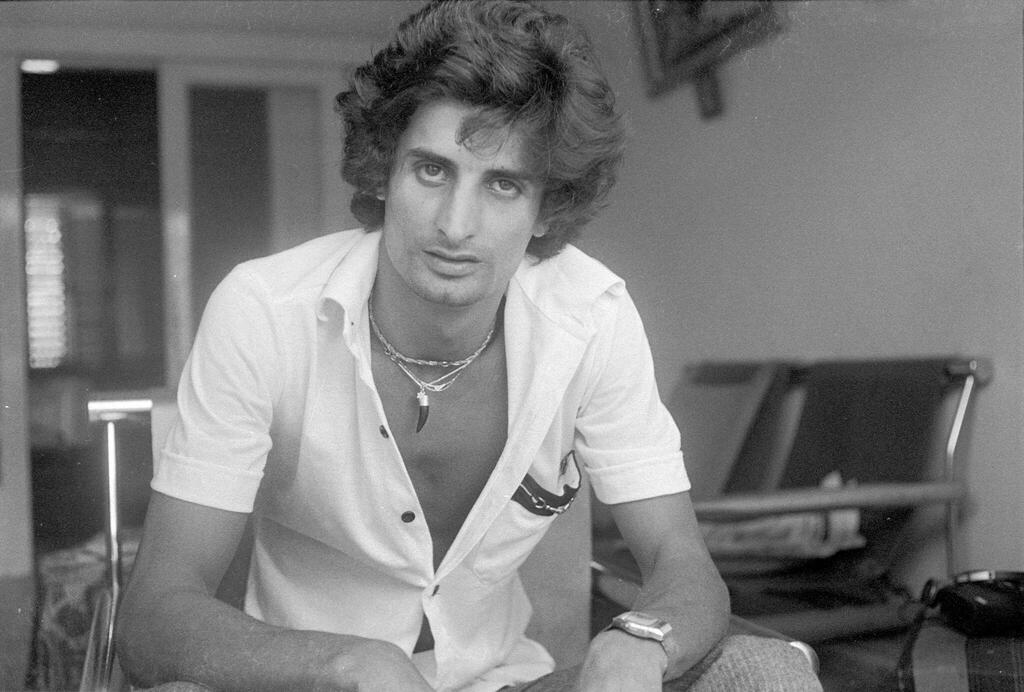
- Zohar Argov, one of the most influential artists in the Mizrahi genre, nicknamed "The king of Mizrahi music".
- Native name: מוזיקה מזרחית
- Etymology: "Mizrahi" + music. Oriental music.
- Stylistic origins: Arabic music; Greek music; Turkish music; Piyyut
- Cultural origins: Late 1950s-Early 1960s, Israel.
- Typical instruments: drum machine; vocals; electric guitar; drums

Mizrahi music (Hebrew: מוזיקה מזרחית, romanized: muzika mizrachit, pronounced [ˈmuzika mizraˈχit], lit. 'Eastern music' or 'Oriental music') refers to a music genre in Israel that combines elements from the Middle East, North Africa, and Europe; and is mostly performed by Israelis of Mizrahi Jewish descent. It is usually sung in Modern Hebrew, or literary Hebrew.

== Emergence of Mizrahi music ==
=== Background ===
Mizrahi Jews who immigrated from the Arab countries have, over the last 50 years, created a unique musical style that combines elements of Arabic, Turkish, and Greek music. This is not to be confused with the New Hebrew Style, as the Mizrahi style is more spontaneous.

After World War II, many Jewish families made Aliyah to the new state of Israel, founded in 1948. The Muzika Mizrahit movement started in the 1950s with homegrown performers in neighborhoods with a high concentration of Jews from Arab countries who would play at weddings and other events. They performed songs in Hebrew, but in an Arabic style, on traditional Arabic instruments—the oud, kanun, and the darbuka. In the 1960s, they added acoustic and electric guitar to their sound and so their sound became more eclectic. Vocalists usually decorated their singing with trills, and delivery was often nasal or guttural in sound. Intonation was typically Western, however; singers did not use the quartertone scales typical of Arabic music. Into the 1980s synthesizers and electronic instruments made their debut in Mizrahi music.

The first Mizrahi artist of this era was the Moroccan-born Jo Amar, who through the 1950s and 1960s made several albums and songs contributing to the genre, mostly influenced by Moroccan music. Another notable if foreign artist that helped contribute to the young genre was Aris San, who helped popularise Greek music in Israel in the 1960s and 1970s with his distinct rock style on traditional Greek songs.

Lyrics were originally texts taken from classic Hebrew literature, including poems by medieval Hebrew poets. Later they added texts by Israeli poets, and began writing original lyrics as well. An example is the song "Hanale Hitbalbela" (Hannale was confused), sung by Yizhar Cohen. The lyrics are by the modern Israeli poet and lyricist Natan Alterman, to a traditional tune. Singers also translated childhood favorites from Arabic to Hebrew and added electronics and a faster tempo.

=== The 1970s and onward ===
Two of the first mainstream Mizrahi musicians were Zohar Argov and Avihu Medina. Argov grew up in Rishon LeZion singing in his synagogue with a very defined Middle Eastern melisma. His definitive Mizrahi hit was HaPerah BeGani (הפרח בגני 'The Flower in my Garden'), which won the Mizrahi music festival and became the genre’s mainstream breakthrough. After his suicide he became an icon in Israel for what happens when one is cheated by society. A play titled HaMelekh (המלך 'The King') was written about his life story, portrayed his fall to drugs and his troubles with the law. It was extremely popular, and later a biographical film (biopic) about him was made in 1993 titled "Zohar", to much acclaim and fanfare.

Avihu Medina was a singer and composer. He composed many popular hits for Argov as well as other artists such as Shimi Tavori, Daklon and Haim Moshe. Women also began to play a significant part in popular Mizrahi music. A popular artist was Zehava Ben. Because of her ties to Morocco and the Middle East she began her career singing Umm Kulthum. Another notable female artist was Margalit Tzan'ani who would later become a famous television personality.

Because Mediterranean Israeli music was so popular within the Mizrahi Jewish communities, which were quickly becoming a large percentage of Israel, the natural outcome would be a continuous playback on the local radio station. However, the national government restricted the play of Mizrahi music because it was not considered ‘authentic Israeli.’ The music was referred to as "too Arabic" and Ashkenazi radio editors and musical enthusiasts rejected it. The social researcher, Sami Shalom Chetrit, wrote "The educational and cultural establishment made every effort to separate the second generation of eastern immigrants from this music, by intense socialization in schools and in the media".

The penetration of Muzika Mizrahit into the Israeli mainstream was the result of pressure by Mizrahi composers and producers such as Avihu Medina, the overwhelming, undeniable popularity of the style, and the gradual adoption of elements of Muzika Mizrahit by popular Israeli artists. Yardena Arazi, one of Israel's most popular stars, made a recording in 1989 called "Dimion Mizrahi" (Eastern Imagination), and included original materials and some canonical Israeli songs.

The acceptance of Muzika Mizrahit, over the 1990s, parallels the social struggle of Israelis of Sephardic and Mizrahi origin to achieve social and cultural acceptance. "Today, the popular Muzika Mizrahit has begun to erase the differences from rock music, and we can see not a few artists turning into mainstream. This move to the mainstream culture includes cultural assimilation," writes literary researcher and critic Mati Shmuelof.

It is a widely accepted fact by now that the invention of the recordable cassette by the Philips Corporation and the commercial cassette distribution network in the Tel Aviv train station had a large impact on the popularity of Mediterranean Israeli music. Cassettes allowed the Mizrahi population to create and distribute their own music within their communities. They also allowed for more musical integration. One could have Umm Kulthum and a neighbor who is an emerging singer. Cassette tapes were a predominant factor in the growth of Mediterranean Israeli music in the 1970s. After first being a favorite at community celebrations, such as weddings and birthdays and bar mitvahs, the recording of one particular wedding party became a desired commodity in the Mizrahi ma'abarot ("transit camp"). These cassettes are what caused ethnomusicologist Amy Horowitz to start researching this blossoming new music style. The cassettes also gave birth to a new nickname for Mizrahi artists which was "cassette singers" (זמרי קסטה).

After Reuveni's friends and neighbours started offering to buy the cassettes he realized he might have a great opportunity on his hands. He and his brother later went on to found one of the major Mizrahi cassette companies in Israel, The Brothers Revueni, who would sign many successful artists such as Zohar Argov, Haim Moshe, Margalit Tzan'ani and others.

== Fusion genres ==
Over time fusions of Mizrahi music with other genres emerged, including oriental rock, hip hop, and pop.

=== Rock and metal ===
Rock Mizrahi ("oriental rock") is a wide term that incorporates several different Israeli musical styles. It is defined by the combining of rock music with middle eastern instruments, compositions and singing techniques. Comparison may be drawn with progressive rock, as Middle Eastern scales and rhythm tend to break western norms. Some examples are Orphaned Land, Knesiyat Hasekhel, Algeir and lead singer Aviv Guedj, Yosi Sassi and Dudu Tassa. Another notable example is Fortisakharof, a creative duo consisting of Rami Fortis and Berry Sakharof. Both Fortis and Sakharof have partial Mizrachi backgrounds (Turkish and Iraqi). The oriental elements in their music range from very subtle to very apparent at times. The two began their project in 1989 following the breakup of post-punk group Minimal Compact. Both groups feature several Middle Eastern themes, including one song in Gibberish Arabic, "Sandanya", from their debut LP Foreign Affair.

The fusion of Mizrahi music and metal music can be defined as oriental metal. Other sub genres of Rock rarely categorize their oriental influences.

=== Pop ===
By the mid 1990s, Mizrahi Pop labels had already begun to transform from underground operations distributing cassettes within the Mizrahi community to a much more formal and standardized Music Industry. Musicians and producers of that time were starting to incorporate more elements of rock, techno, electronic dance music, Europop and R&B, while still strongly emphasizing the Greek, Turkish and Arab roots. Along with earlier examples like Ofra Haza and Ethnix, later acts like Zehava Ben, Eyal Golan, Sarit Hadad and others revolutionized the genre and brought it to much larger audiences. Some songs of this era had already become hits in neighboring countries, including Greece and Arab countries. Mizrahi Pop became a target to mockery and often disregarded by the mainstream pop culture of Israel at the time. Although demographically they may have been equally popular, most radio stations were refusing to play Mizrachi Pop, favoring American and European influenced pop and rock. The distinction between Mizrahi pop and the mainstream was clear. With many Mizrachi Pop hit singles still being low budget productions, mainstream critics and media were mostly ignoring the genre, with the excuse of Mizrachi Pop lacking artistic depth. Most songs were rather straight forward love songs, translations of Greek/Mediterranean songs or Jewish themed songs, with songwriting following a certain formula. This is why comparisons to other global "counterculture turned mainstream movements" are less appropriate, with Hip hop and reggae music being highly innovative, as well as political and protest oriented. It is, however, widely agreed that many Mizrahi pop songs do have a lot more in them than it first seems, so perhaps many of them were to some extent misunderstood for being ahead of their time. There were also many cases of mutual influencing of the two movements in Israeli Pop as early as 1985, with some well-known Ashkenazi songwriters admiring the Mizrahi sound. During the 2000s and 2010, Mizrahi Pop has grown to become the most prominent form of pop music in Israel. In 2019, singer Omer Adam sold 50,000 tickets in Yarkon Park, only 1,000 people less to break Kaveret record of 51,000 people at the same place in 2013.

== Well-known Mizrahi artists ==
=== Singers ===
- Achinoam Nini (Yemenite Jew)
- Ahuva Ozeri (1948-2016) (Yemenite Jew)
- Amir Benayoun (Algerian Jew)
- Avi Peretz (Moroccan Jew)
- Avi Bitter (Turkish Jew)
- Avihu Medina (Yemenite Jew)
- Bo'az Ma'uda (Yemenite Jew)
- Daklon (Yemenite Jew)
- Dana International (Yemenite Jew)
- David D'Or (Libyan Jew)
- David Serero (Moroccan Jew)
- Dudu Aharon (Yemenite Jew)
- Eden Ben Zaken (Moroccan Jew / Polish Jew)
- Eden Hason (Algerian Jew)
- Eli Luzon (Libyan Jew)
- Ehud Banai (Persian Jew)
- Eti Zach (Ishtar) (Egyptian Jew / Moroccan Jew)
- Etti Ankri (Tunisian Jew)
- Eviatar Banai (Persian Jew)
- Eyal Golan (Moroccan Jew / Yemenite Jew)
- Gad Elbaz (Moroccan Jew)
- Gali Atari (Yemenite Jew)
- Haim Moshe (Yemenite Jew)
- Idan Yaniv (Bukharan Jew)
- Itzik Kala (Kurdish Jew)
- Izhar Cohen (Yemenite Jew)
- Jo Amar (1930–2009) (Moroccan Jew)
- Kobi Oz (Tunisian Jew)
- Kobi Peretz (Moroccan Jew)
- Lior Narkis (Iraqi Jew / Serbian Jew) (Greek-Tunisian ancestry, maternal grandfather)
- Mike Sharif (Israeli Druze)
- Margalit Tzan'ani (Yemenite Jew)
- Maya Buskila (Moroccan Jew)
- Meir Banai (1960-2017) (Persian Jew)
- Miri Mesika (Tunisian Jew / Iraqi Jew)
- Moran Mazor (Georgian Jew)
- Moshe Peretz (Moroccan Jew / Iraqi Jew)
- Moshik Afia (Lebanese Jew)
- Müjde (Turkish Israeli)
- Nasrin Kadri (Arab-Israeli)
- Netta Barzilai (Libyan Jew / Moroccan Jew)
- Ninet Tayeb (Tunisian Jew / Moroccan Jew)
- Noa Kirel (Moroccan Jew / Austrian Jewish )
- Ofer Levi (Kurdish Jew)
- Ofra Haza (1957–2000) (Yemenite Jew)
- Omer Adam (Mountain Jew / Ashkenazi Jew)
- Pe'er Tasi (Yemenite Jew)
- Ruhama Raz (Persian Jew)
- Sarit Hadad (Mountain Jew)
- Shimi Tavori (Yemenite Jew)
- Shlomi Shabat (Turkish Jew)
- Shoshana Damari (1923–2006) (Yemenite Jew)
- Valerie Hamaty (Arab-Israeli)
- Yael Naim (Tunisian Jew)
- Yaniv D'Or (Libyan Jew)
- Yehuda Saado
- Yishai Levi (1963-2026) (Yemenite Jew)
- Yona Atari (1933-2019) (Yemenite Jew)
- Yossi Banai (1932-2006) (Persian Jew)
- Yuval Banai (Persian Jew)
- Zehava Ben (Moroccan Jew)
- Tzion Golan (Yemenite Jew)
- Zohar Argov (1955–1987) (Yemenite Jew)

=== Music formations ===
- The Revivo Project – Raviv Ben Menachem, Nir Ben Menachem and Eliran Tsur
- Tzliley Hakerem – Daklon, Moshe Ben Moshe (Ben Mosh) and Haim Moshe
- Tzliley Haud – Rami Danooch, Yehuda Caesar, and David Gazla.
- Ethnix

== See also ==
- Coma Dance Festival
- Arabic music

== Bibliography ==
- Horowitz, Amy (Summer 1999). "Israeli Mediterranean Music: Straddling Disputed Territories". Journal of American Folklore. 112 (445): 450–463. doi:10.2307/541372. JSTOR 541372.
- Horowitz, Amy (2010). Mediterranean Israeli Music and the Politics of the Aesthetic. Wayne State University Press. ISBN 978-0-8143-3465-2.
