= Zehava Ben =

Israeli singer

Zehava Ben זהבה בן
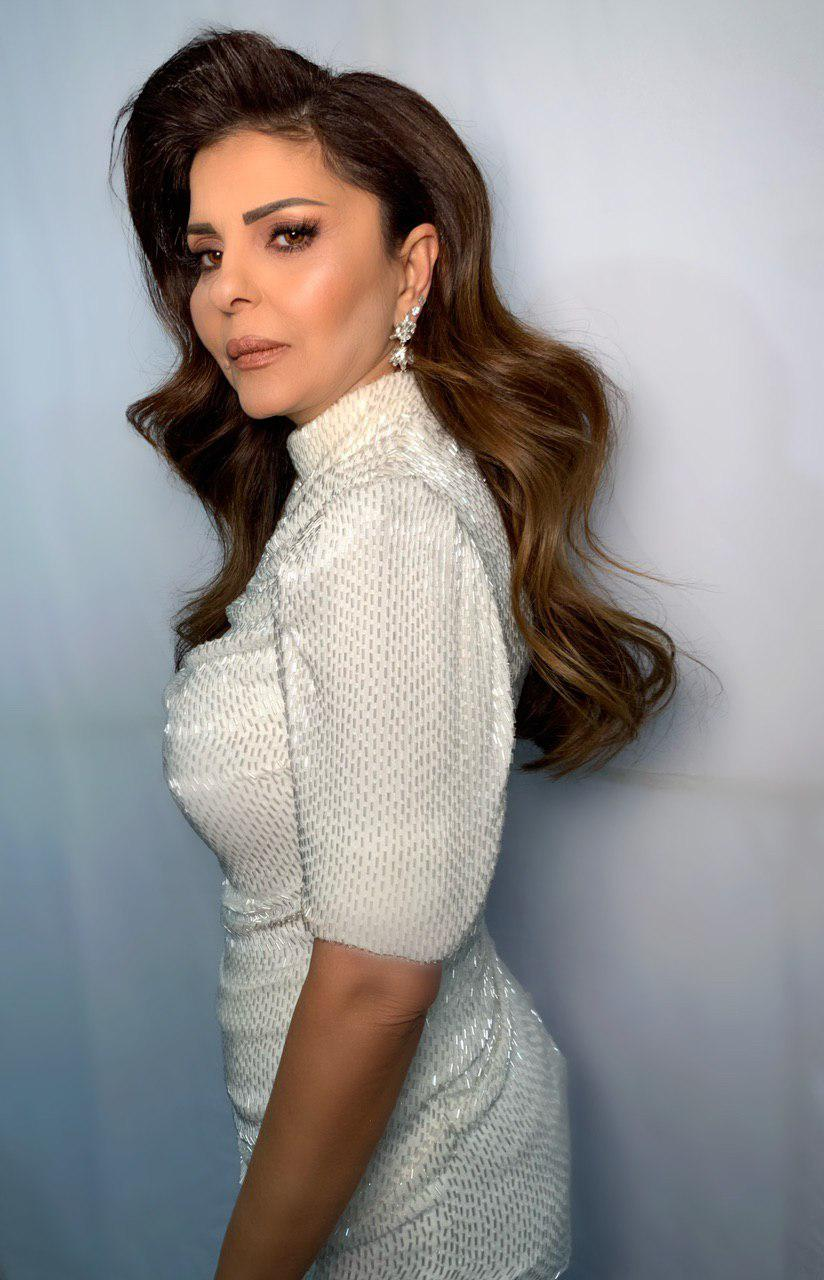

Background information
- Born: Zehava Benisti; 8 November 1968 (age 57); Beersheba, Israel
- Genres: Pop, Mizrahi
- Occupation: Singer
- Instrument: Vocals
- Years active: 1990–present

Zehava Ben (born Zehava Benisti; Hebrew: זהבה בן; 8 November 1968) is an Israeli singer. Ben is one of the most popular Israeli female vocalists in the Mizrahi music genre; the Middle Eastern-style of singing rising from Israel's Mizrahi Jewish population, dominating Israeli music in the 1990s and popular ever since.

== Early life ==
Ben was born Zehava Benisti in Beersheba, the capital city of the Negev in Southern Israel, in Shikun Dalet (Neighborhood D), a poor neighborhood, to a Moroccan Jewish family. She has an identical twin sister named Esther 'Etti' Levy (Hebrew: אתי לוי) who is also a musician.

Zehava is confident in her Moroccan heritage, and most of her music is quite distinctive of that, singing both in Hebrew and Moroccan Arabic.

== Career ==
=== 20th century ===
Zehava became familiar in Israel in 1989, when a song called "Tipat Mazal" (A Bit of Luck) and an album of the same name, became a hit throughout Israel, primarily among Israel's Mizrahi Jews (Jews of Middle Eastern and North African backgrounds) and Arab Israelis. The title track is a Hebrew cover for the 1984 song Dil Yarasi by the Turkish musician Orhan Gencebay. A few years later, Ben also participated in a film bearing the same name.

One of her famous songs, "Ma Yihye" (What Will Be) from 1994, was featured in the Buddha Bar collection.

Despite her music being banned in some Arab countries due to the Arab League boycott of Israel, Zehava gained popularity throughout the Arab world as an Arabic-language singer. Among her repertoire are re-makes of traditional Arabic hits, including "Enta Omri" (You Are My Life) by legendary Egyptian singer Umm Kulthum.

Zehava appeared in the 1996 election campaign for the left-wing political party Meretz, singing the famous "Shir LaShalom" (Song For Peace) together with Dana Berger. This was the same song the late prime minister Yitzhak Rabin sang in a rally before his assassination a few months earlier.

=== 21st century ===
After 9/11, Ben and Etti Ankri, David D'Or, Arkadi Duchin, and other Israeli singers recorded the title song "Yesh Od Tikvah" ("Our Hope Endures"), for which D'Or wrote the music and lyrics, on the CD Yesh Od Tikvah/You've Got a Friend. The CD, released by Hed Arzi in 2002, benefited Israeli terror victims, with all proceeds going to NATAL Israel: the Israel Trauma center for Victims of Terror and War.

In 2005, Zehava Ben entered a song contest to represent Israel in the Eurovision Song Contest with the song "Peace And Love" (sung in Hebrew, Arabic and English). She reached second place to winner Shiri Maimon (another Jewish Israeli of Moroccan heritage).

Ben has appeared in many music festivals outside Israel, including in Sweden and France.

In 2022, Ben won the Israeli edition of Big Brother.

In 2025, Ben was honored as one of the torchbearers in the national Israeli Independence Day ceremony.

== Discography ==
- 1999: Best of Zehava Ben
- 2000: Arabic Songs
- 2000: Crying Rain
- 2000: Stop the World
- 2000: What Kind of World
- 2000: White Stork
- 2000: Super Gold
- 2001: Coming Home
- 2001: Real King
- 2001: To Be Human
- 2002: Melech Amiti (A Real King)
- 2003: Beit Avi (My Father's House)
- 2003: Laroz Variations
- 2003: My Father's House
- 2003: Looking Forward
- 2003: To Be a Man
- 2004: Zehava Ben
- 2005: Sings Arabic vol. 1
- 2005: Sings Arabic vol. 2
- 2005: Children's Songs
- 2006: The Best of Zehava Ben
- 2008: Going with the Light
- 2009: The Best of the Best
- 2011: Nights at Home

== See also ==
- Kdam Eurovision
- Mizrahi Music
