= Aris San =

Greek-Israeli singer (1940–1992)

Aris San Άρης Σαν אריס סאן
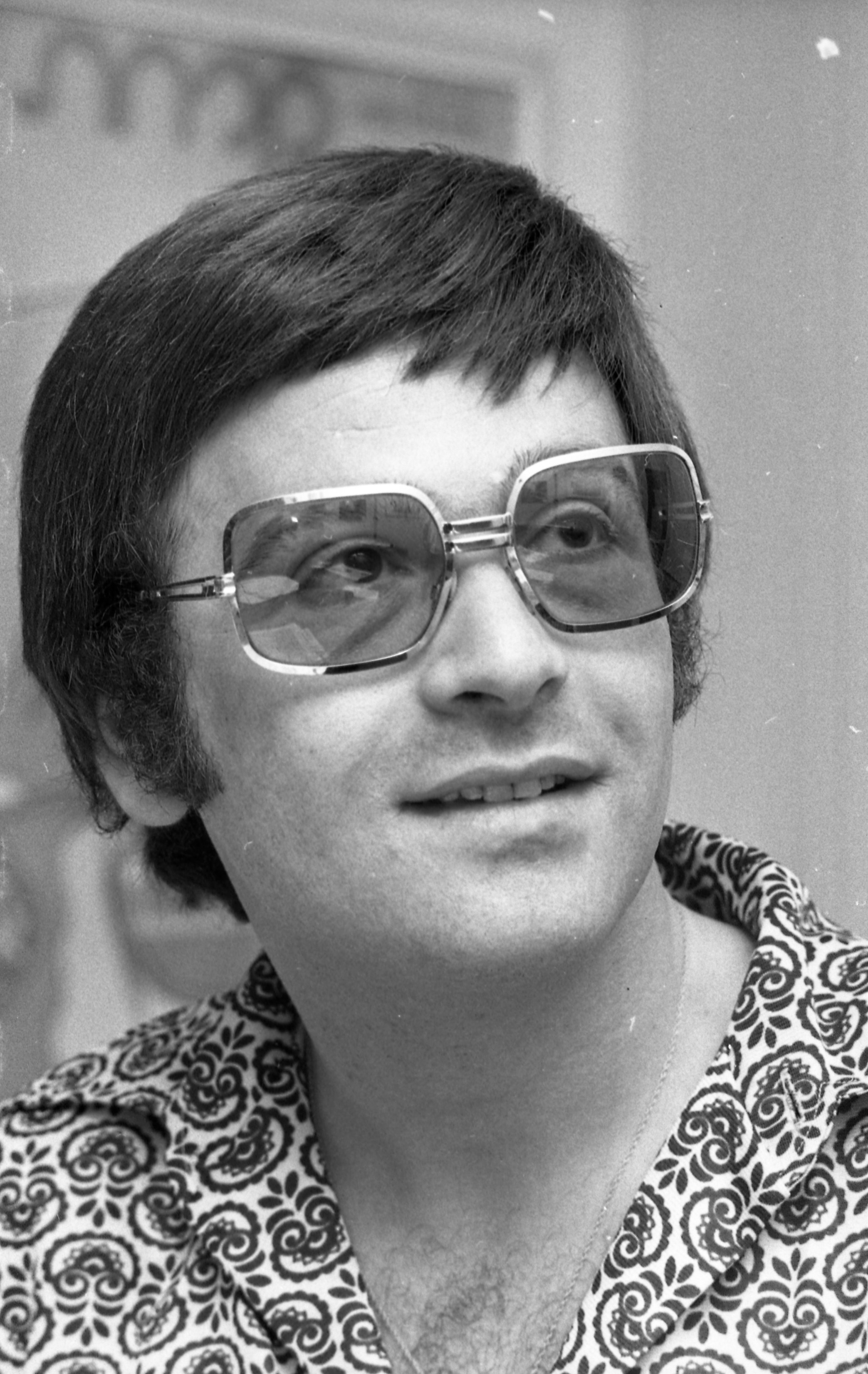
- Aris San in 1972

Background information
- Born: Aristides Seisanas; 19 January 1940; Kalamata, Greece
- Died: 25 July 1992 (aged 52) Budapest, Hungary
- Genres: Greek music; Mizrahi music
- Occupations: Singer; musician; nightclub owner
- Instruments: Vocals; guitar
- Years active: 1957–1992

Aris San (Greek: Άρης Σαν, Hebrew: אריס סאן; 19 January 1940 – 25 July 1992) was a Greek-Israeli singer and nightclub owner who popularized Greek music and based in Israel in the late 1950s and 1960s.

== Biography ==
Aristides Seisanas (Greek: Αριστείδης Σεϊσανάς) was born in Kalamata, Greece. At the age of 17, he sailed from Athens to Israel, shortening his name to "Aris San" on board. San began playing at the Arianna nightclub in Yafo, a bastion of Israelis from Thessaloniki. His unique approach to playing the electric guitar like a bouzouki and creative melding of different styles of music opened Israeli society to Greek and Mizrahi music. The club proved popular with senior officers and members of Mapai (forerunner of Labor and, at the time, the ruling party), including Moshe Dayan.

Lucy Maloul, a singer known professionally as Aliza Azikri, visited the club with her manager and husband Nissim Azikri. A romantic relationship developed between Aris San and Azikri that became grist for the gossip columns. They had a daughter, Sani. San wrote songs for Azikri.

In Israel, San gained prominence for songs like "Sigal" and "Boom Pam". His band played at the double wedding of the children of Moshe Dayan, which was attended by David Ben-Gurion. The speed with which he obtained his Israeli passport and his close relationship with army officers encouraged gossip columnists to accuse him of being a spy, a charge he denied out of hand.

San left Israel a few months after the birth of his daughter on the eve of Yom Kippur. He settled in New York City and opened a successful nightclub, Sirocco. Some of the club's most notable guests were Anthony Quinn, Louis Armstrong, Frank Sinatra, Dean Martin and Sammy Davis Jr. Eventually, however, as San developed a cocaine habit and Sirocco gained the interest of the underworld, the club was raided by the FBI, which discovered drugs on the premises. San did not cooperate with the investigation, was convicted, and served a two-year sentence. Upon his release he opened a poultry business in Harlem and another nightclub, which was unsuccessful. He later moved to Budapest. He borrowed money from local organized crime loan sharks to purchase cocaine, but did not repay it. In 1992, he was hospitalized following a heart attack and mafia hitmen strangled him with a pillow at the hospital. His remains were cremated.

== Film ==
- The Mystery of Aris San - Documentary screened at the Jerusalem International Film Festival in 2007 and directed by Dani Dothan.

== See also ==
- Music of Israel
- Culture of Israel
