= Kobi Peretz =

Israel singer

Kobi Peretz קובי פרץ
- Peretz in 2021

Background information
- Born: Kobi Peretz; 28 October 1975 (age 50)
- Origin: Tel Aviv, Israel
- Genre: Mizrahi dance-pop
- Years active: 1992-present

Kobi Peretz (Hebrew: קובי פרץ; born 28 October 1975), is an Israeli singer of Mizrahi music.

== Biography ==
Yaakov (Kobi) Peretz was born and raised in Tel Aviv, the youngest of 10 children. He is of Moroccan Jewish descent. He is known for his hit Balbeli Oto (Confuse Him).

== Controversies ==
In 2016, he was sentenced to 18 months in prison for tax evasion. He began his term at Maasiyahu Prison on 15 October 2017.

During the Gaza war, a video of Peretz performing to soldiers, chanting and singing “May their village burn, May Gaza be erased" has been included in South Africa's application to the International Court of Justice in the South Africa v. Israel (Genocide Convention) case. In March 2024, Peretz defended his statement on Israel's Channel 14, stating "We’re burning their village, we need to erase their village and we need to burn their village.” State attorney Amit Aisman considered opening a criminal investigation into Peretz over the matter.

== Selected discography ==
- You Are Like Fire – 1995
- The Arrow of Love – 1997
- I Live The Way I Want – 2001
- Confuse Him – 2003
- Crazy About You – 2004
- All That's In Me – 2006
- How Much Love – 2008
- Written in the Heavens – 2012

== See also ==
- Mizrahi music
- Israeli music
