= Daklon =

Mizrahi-style Israeli singer

דַּקְלוֹן (Daklon) יוֹסֵף לֵוִי
- Born: Yosef Levy; April 6, 1944 (age 82); Tel Aviv, Mandatory Palestine
- Occupation: Singer
- Years active: 1960s–present

Daklon (Hebrew: דַּקְלוֹן) (born Yosef Levy; Hebrew: יוֹסֵף לֵוִי; 6 April 1944) is an Israeli singer. He was born in Tel Aviv's Kerem Hateimanim neighborhood, the son of Jewish immigrants from the Shar'ab region in Yemen. Daklon explains the source of his nickname: "In those days, everyone in the Kerem had a nickname. Your given name was a form of identification. As a kid, I was quite short and skinny (Hebrew: דַקְ, romanized: dak/daq) and so, they called me Daklon." He started his musical career as an 11-year-old when his teacher sent him to do a piece for a religious music radio show.

== Career ==
At the end of the 1950s, Daklon's professional career took off. He was first inspired to take his music to the professional level by the famous Moroccan-born Israeli singer, Joe Amar. Daklon had also translated famous Greek and Hindi songs into Hebrew in the 1960s at the beginning of his career. Since the 1960s, he has been performing with Haim Moshe and Avihu Medina. He has produced more than 35 albums to date.

Daklon music draws on Jewish, Middle-Eastern and Yemenite Jewish poetry, psalms, Bible, and ancient Jewish hymns.

== See also ==
- Music of Israel
- Culture of Israel
