= Zohar Argov =

Israeli singer

Zohar Argov זוהר ארגוב
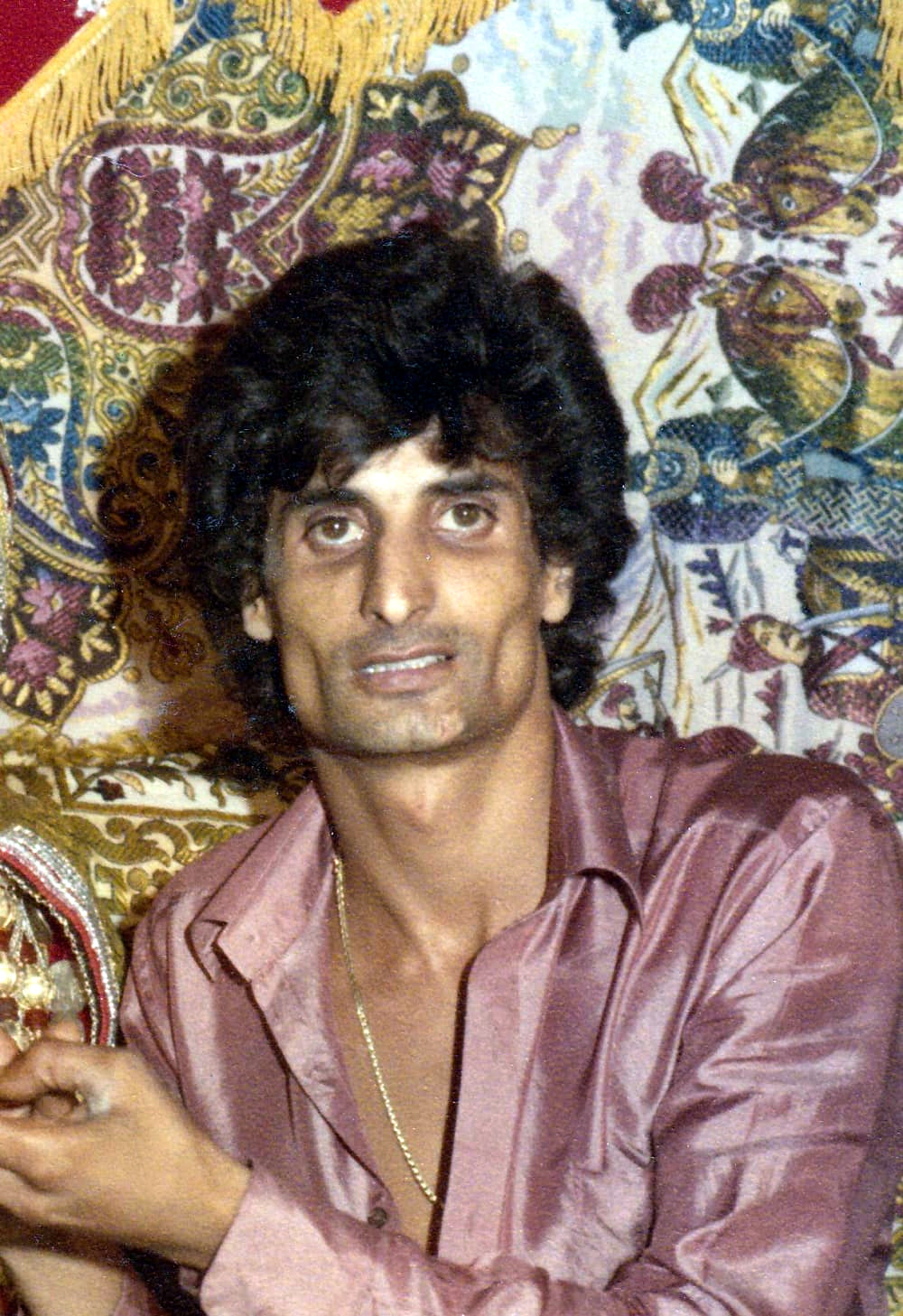
- Argov in 1987

Background information
- Born: Zohar Orkabi; July 16, 1955; Rishon LeZion, Israel
- Origin: Tel Aviv, Israel.
- Died: November 6, 1987 (aged 32) Rishon LeZion, Israel
- Cause of death: Accidental suicide by hanging
- Genres: Mizrahi, rock
- Years active: 1977–1987
- Label: The Ruveni Brothers
- Spouse: Bracha Tzabari (m. 1972; div. 1978)

Zohar Orkabi (Hebrew: זוהר עורקבי; July 16, 1955 – November 6, 1987), known professionally as Zohar Argov (זוהר ארגוב), was an Israeli singer. A distinctive voice in the Mizrahi music scene, Argov is widely known in Israel as the "king of Mizrahi music". However, he remains a divisive figure in Israeli culture due to his controversial rape conviction and charges.

== Biography ==
Zohar Argov was born in Rishon LeZion, Israel, to Ovadia and Yona Orkabi, immigrants from Yemen. He was the eldest of ten children. He displayed a talent for singing in childhood, and his classmates nicknamed him "nightingale". All his siblings also exhibited an interest in music. As a result of Argov's disinterest in any aspect of school except music, and exacerbated by his family's financial problems, he dropped out of school at age 14 to work in construction. In 1972, he married a neighbor, Bracha Tzabari, and a year later, she gave birth to their son, Gili. Argov's father Ovadia, with whom he had had a stormy relationship over the latter's authoritarianism and alcoholism, died on the day of Gili's brit. Gili would later follow in his father's footsteps and become a singer as well. Due to his family situation, he was exempted from compulsory military service in the Israel Defense Forces.

== Music career ==
In 1977, at age 22, Argov published a single with two songs written and composed by Moshe Nagar. When releasing this single, in consultation with his wife Bracha, he changed his last name from Orkabi to Argov. He felt that the name Orkabi would not "sound good" to the media and establishment, and chose the name of one of the greatest composers and musicians in Israel at the time, Sasha Argov. The single was unsuccessful, airing only once on a radio broadcast featuring "musical oddities". Nonetheless, he began performing live full-time, but his pay was meager, and within months, he incurred huge debts, all of his property was repossessed, and he could no longer support his wife and son. The family's poor financial condition and the pressure of late-night club appearances put a strain on his marriage, which ended with Bracha moving back in with her parents and taking Gili with her.

In 1978, Argov was arrested after offering a woman a ride home from a Bar Mitzvah performance, then forcing her into his apartment and raping her. His trial was presided over by judge Dov Levin, who would later serve as a judge on the Supreme Court of Israel. During his trial, when it was still not clear to the court whether the incident constituted rape or consensual relations, Argov commented, "There's no young woman who doesn't allow it; you just need to know how to take." He was convicted of rape as a result of this comment, and sentenced to one year in prison and two years on probation. His wife filed for divorce during this time.

Argov was released from prison in 1979, after which he returned to performing. At first, he joined a band that performed at clubs and family events. During an event in Beersheba featuring Jacky Mekaiten, another well-known Mizrahi singer, Argov asked to sing, and Jacky and the band members agreed. He then performed two songs live.

Argov's debut album Elinor (1980) featured the title track, "Sod HaMazalot" ("The Zodiac Secret"), and "Mah Lakh, Yaldah?" ("What's With You, Girl?"), a tribute to his ex-wife, Bracha, who remained the love of his life. With the success of the album, Argov became a popular recording artist, and performed live throughout Israel. He was among the first to achieve commercial and nationwide success in the sphere of Middle Eastern-Mediterranean/Oriental (Mizrahi)-style music, despite the fact that this genre was not mainstream at the time and radio stations gave preference to pop music from overseas.

In 1982, Argov competed in the Mizrahi Music Festival with the song “HaPerah BeGani” (הפרח בגני, The Flower in my Garden), which ultimately won and became Argov’s and subsequently Mizrahi music’s mainstream breakthrough. Ironically, Argov disliked the song and wanted to perform “Shir Prati” (שיר פרטי, Private Song) at the festival.

Afterwards, Argov toured the United States, and was invited to parties and clubs, where he was first exposed to hard drugs and began to develop his heroin and crack cocaine addiction. He claimed that he was first introduced to hard drugs at Club Halleluyah in Los Angeles. From 1983, his drug addiction began to affect his functioning. By the end of the year, his drug abuse coupled with his demanding performance schedule was beginning to visibly affect his health. In late 1983, three associates took him to Eilat and locked him in a hotel room to detox. However, this was unsuccessful.

Although he was still able to perform under the influence, his drug abuse caused him to miss performances and recording sessions. By this time Argov was wealthy, but was spending his fortune on drugs. After deciding that he could not overcome his drug addiction, the Reuveni brothers ended their contract with him and chose to sign a contract with a promising new star, Haim Moshe, instead. Argov was stung by what he viewed as their betrayal, as well as the realization that there was no hope of reconciling with his ex-wife Bracha after she remarried at around this time. After his break with the Reuveni brothers, Avigdor Ben-Mosh became his producer. Although he continued recording, he exhibited dysfunctional behavior during recording sessions.

In 1984, Argov toured the United States and France. On July 16, 1984, after returning to Israel from a performance in Paris, he was arrested for drug dealing. He was released on bail two weeks later, but prohibited from leaving the country for the next six months. By this time, his drug addiction was ruining his career and draining his wealth. Promoters began to take advantage of him by underpaying or pretending to pay him. In 1985, he released another album. In February of that year, during a Paris tour, he nearly overdosed. In June 1985, he was arrested for possession of heroin and received a one-year suspended sentence.

In late 1985, he signed a 15-year contract with Jerusalem producer Nissim Ben-Haim. He released his seventh album in 1986. It was a commercial success, but Argov performed rarely that year, until he had himself committed to a rehabilitation program. Upon completing the program in 1987, he appeared on a talk show and declared he was clean and ready to start a new chapter in his life. Two months later, he lapsed back into drug abuse. In April 1987, a label released Argov's eighth and final album against his wishes. Argov had tried to prevent the album’s release via legal action, but failed.

== Death ==
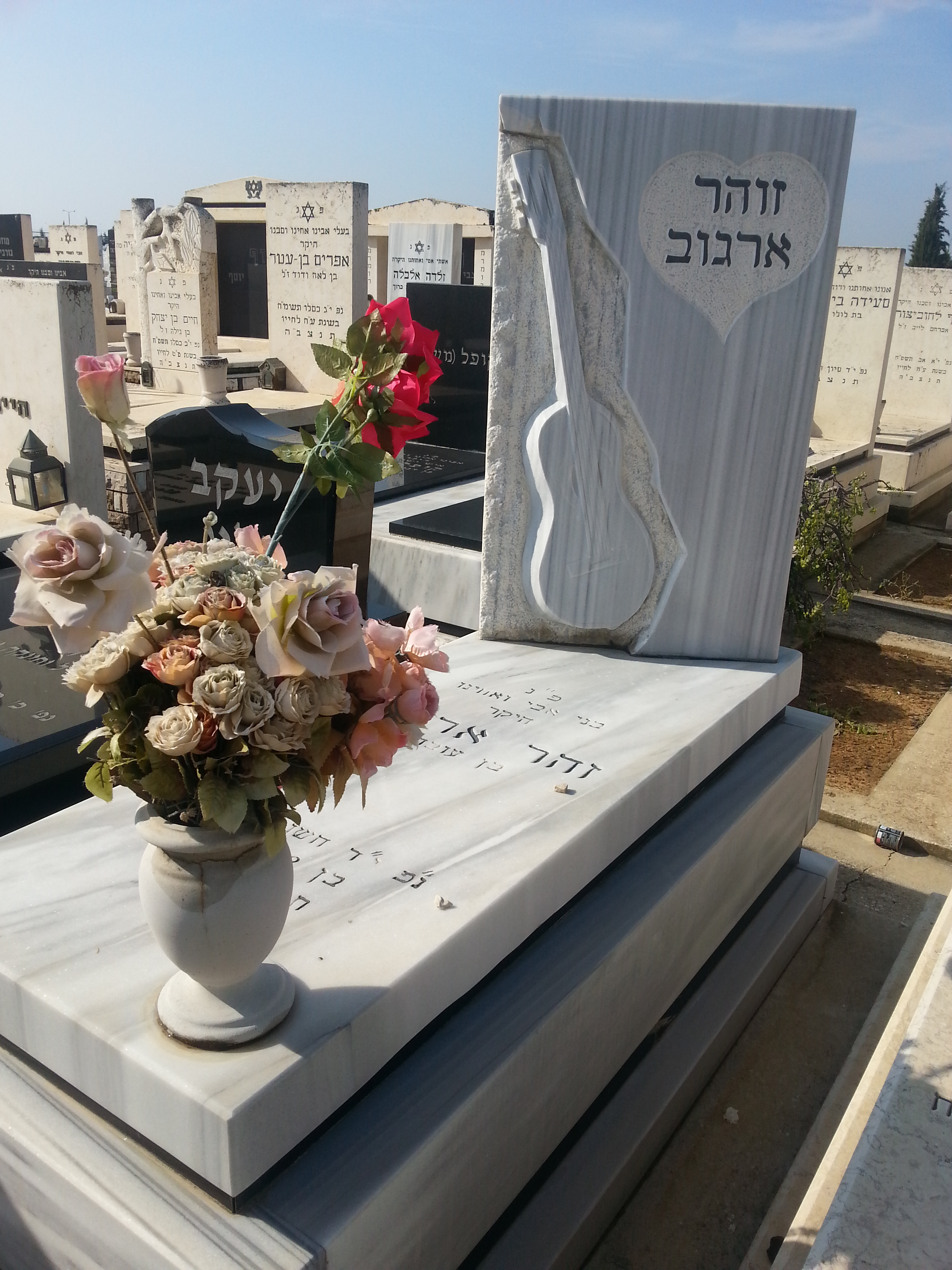
Zohar Argov's grave

In the early morning hours of July 23, 1987, Argov, his brother, and another man entered the Magen David Adom station in Rishon LeZion and demanded drugs. Shortly afterward, Argov was arrested on suspicion of stealing the purse of a doctor in the area, but was released after it was determined he had nothing to do with the theft. During his release from police custody, Argov stole a pistol that was lying on a desk. After an extensive manhunt, he was arrested with the pistol in his possession, convicted, and sentenced to one month in prison, which was extended to six months upon appeal.

Three weeks before he was due to be released, Argov was granted a furlough to allow him to go home. He initially stayed in the home of singer Yishai Levi in Holon before he and Levi's girlfriend and future wife, Iris Gabbay, stayed alone at Argov's mother's house in Rishon LeZion. Afterwards, Gabbay filed a police complaint claiming that Argov had attempted to rape her. Upon returning to prison, Argov was arrested and taken to a police precinct in Rishon LeZion for interrogation.

On November 6, 1987, Argov died in his cell in an apparent suicide by hanging. He was 32. He was found dead at 4:00 AM, hanging from strips torn from a blanket wrapped around his neck. Chief Superintendent Aharon Tal, who was appointed to investigate Argov's death, concluded that Argov had not intentionally committed suicide, but rather wanted to make it appear as if he was attempting suicide to get concessions from the guards. He died after the strips had tightened around his neck and he was unable to save himself due to the effects of drugs he had taken.

== Legacy and commemoration ==
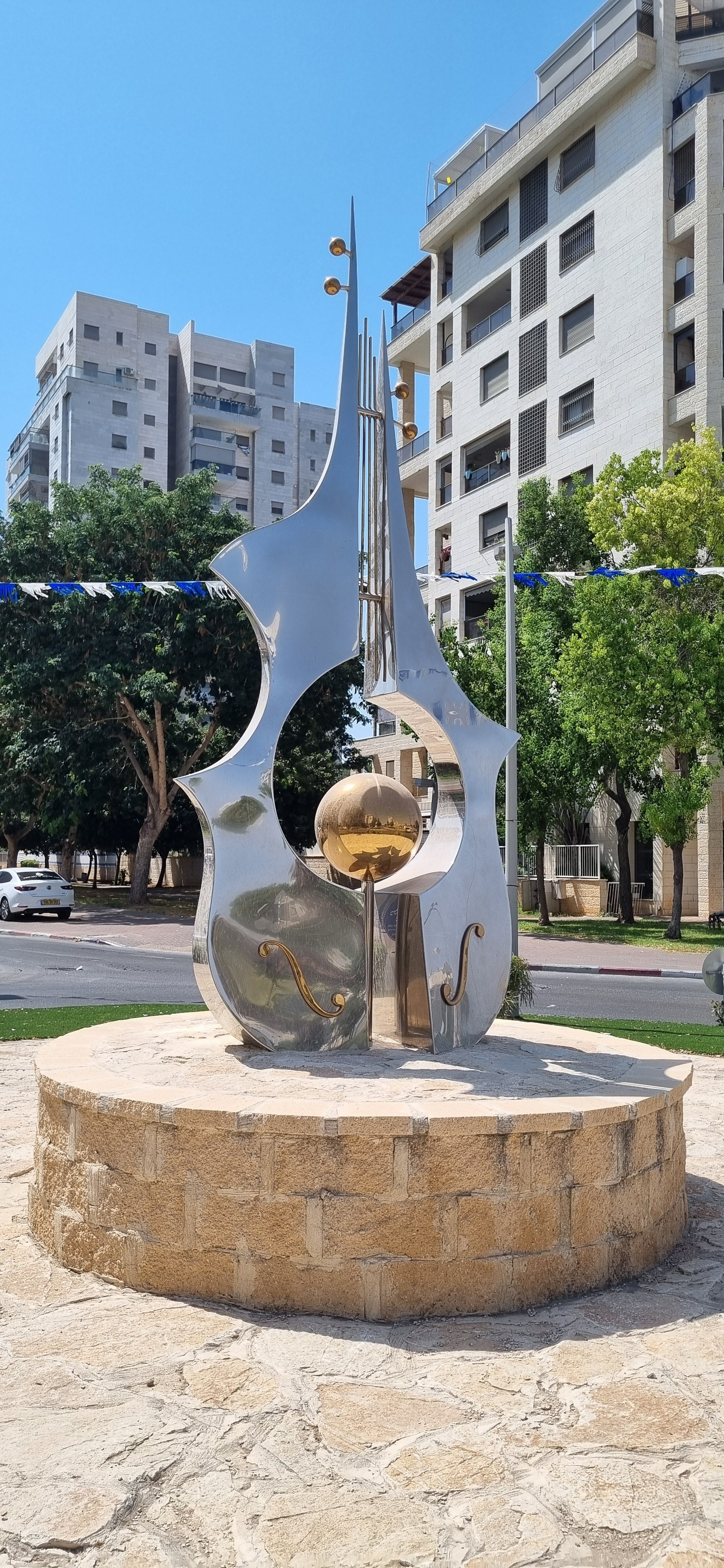
"Zohar Argov square" in Ramla.

After his death Argov continued to retain his status as "HaMelekh" (the King) of Mizrahi music. From 1990, three years after his death, the Israel Broadcasting Authority organized a series of annual memorial concerts at Binyanei HaUma convention center in Jerusalem and a fundraising campaign was launched to establish a drug rehabilitation center named after him. He is credited with introducing Mizrahi music into the Israeli mainstream, and his life story has been widely discussed, with some considering it emblematic of the sociocultural tragedy that befalls singers from the Mizrahi community in Israel.

A mainstream label, Hed Arzi, released a double album of his music, "Zohar Argov: The Best." Argov was the subject of a play mounted at the Cameri Theater in Tel Aviv, and a feature film on his life, "Zohar (1993)," enjoyed commercial success.

His songs, among them "HaPerakh BeGani" ("The Flower in My Garden"), "Mah Lakh, Yaldah?" ("What's With You, Girl"), "Ba'avar Hayu Zmanim" ("There Were Times"), "Nakhon Lehayom" (As of Today) and "Badad" ("Alone"), are now Israeli pop classics and an integral part of national culture. Proposals to name streets after him in Rishon Lezion and Tel Aviv were discussed in 2007 but sparked a controversy due to his conviction for rape.

On April 22, 2009, the Israeli Stamp Service issued a series of 12 postal stamps on the subject of Israeli music. One of the stamps in this collection was dedicated in memory of Argov. The stamp, with a portrait of Argov, was designed by the artist Miri Nestor Sofer. The stamp's tab included a line from Argov's hit song "HaPerach BeGani" (The Flower in My Garden) - "You are the sweet fragrance the flower in my garden".

Eyal Golan released a covers/tribute album of Argov’s best known songs in 2018 named “Nakhon LeTamid” (Forever True).

In 2023, "Kan Le Olam" ("Here Forever"), a duet with Ofra Haza was released in conjunction with Israel's 75th birthday. It was created using artificial intelligence and the families of Argov and Haza consented to its use.

In October 2024, the Revivo Project made use of artificial intelligence to have an "avatar" of Argov perform with them in concerts. This was received with a mixed reception by the Israeli press.

== Discography ==
- HaTaklit HaRishon (the first album), 1977
- Eleanor, 1980
- There Was A Time, 1981
- Nakhon Lehayom (Up to Date), 1982
- Kach Ovrim Chaiyy (My Life Goes On), 1984
- Yam shel dmaot (Floods of Tears), 1985
- Lehiot Adam (to be someone/to be human/to be Adam), 1986
- HaDerech HaBruca (The welcome way), 1987
