= Haim Moshe =

Israeli musical artist

Haim Moshe חיים משה
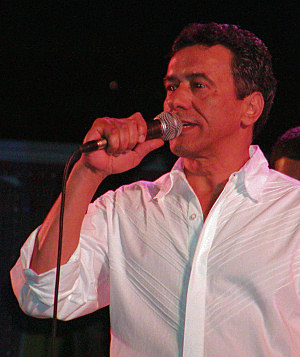
- Haim Moshe at the Independence Day concert in Eilat on 6 May 2003

Background information
- Born: 20 September 1955 (age 71); Ramat HaSharon, Israel
- Origin: HaTikvah, Tel Aviv, Israel
- Genres: Mizrahi, Arabic
- Occupation: Singer
- Instrument: Vocals
- Years active: 1975–present

Haim Moshe (Hebrew: חיים משה, Arabic: حاييم موشيه, sometimes Chaim Moshe on recordings), born 20 September 1955 is an Israeli singer whose musical style has crossed over from Yemenite and Mediterranean "ethnic" music to include mainstream Israeli and western pop elements. He has helped Mizrahi music achieve wide popularity both in Israel and in Arab countries.

== Biography ==
Haim Moshe was born in 1955 in Ramat HaSharon, Israel. His parents were Yemenite Jews who immigrated to Israel after World War II. As a child he learned to sing not only Israeli and Jewish religious music in the synagogue, but also Greek, Turkish, and Arabic songs, which he performed for weddings and Bar Mitzvahs. As a young man, Moshe worked in a print shop, and he served in the Israeli military in the mid-1970s.

== Musical career ==
Moshe began his professional music career as a member of the band "Sounds of the Vineyard" (Hebrew: צלילי הכרם, Tzliley Ha-Kerem) along with Daklon and Moshe Ben-Mosh, playing in clubs and at weddings. Their music was distributed by the brothers Asher and Meir Reuveni, who had started informally selling cassette-tape recordings of wedding performances by Daklon and others. This Mediterranean or Oriental style, which had been neglected by the established Israeli music industry, became known as "cassette tape music" or "central bus station music" (after the stalls in the Tel Aviv Central Bus Station where many of the tapes were sold). Many of the songs were taken from Greek and Turkish pop, with the words translated or entirely rewritten in Hebrew by specialist lyricists, and the music reworked into Yemeni style. Mediterranean music grew in popularity after 1980 and eventually became a profitable business for the Reuveni brothers.

In 1983 Haim Moshe released his first major album, "Ahavat Hayay (Love of My Life)," with 200,000 sales. This album included two hit songs: "Ahavat Hayay," a Yemenite-style song in Hebrew; and "Linda," a Lebanese song which Moshe sang in Arabic. "Linda" was not an immediate hit on Israeli radio, but earned Moshe a following among Palestinians and Arabs from surrounding countries. The success of this album made Haim Moshe a "household word" in Israel.

From the mid-1980s, Moshe began to incorporate more "Shirei Eretz Yisrael" into his repertoire. These "songs of the Land of Israel" formed a corpus of standard Israeli songs, many with patriotic themes, developed to promote an Israeli national identity. This helped Moshe achieve greater mainstream popularity in Israel, but also attracted criticism that he was abandoning his Mizrahi musical and cultural roots in a process of "Ashkenazification."

"My friends say to me: 'Haim, you're exaggerating. You're running out on us. You will soon be an Ashkenazi. Just when we have found a good singer in our style, you turn to another style.' They want me with them, to keep the style for them, to keep up the standards. So that musica mizrahit will receive the honour it deserves. My roots are black, real black… I am and will always be Haim Moshe with the Yemenite accent, the jargon and the admiration for the Oriental culture."

Over the following decades, he released a string of hit albums, among them "Ten LaZman Lalekhet" (Let Time Pass),. His performance of the song "Pictures in an Album," composed by Ze'ev Nehama and Tamir Kaliski, was the 1999 Golden Feather Awards Song of the Year. His most recent album is "Karov LaLev (Close to the Heart)," released in 2008.

== Cultural influence ==
Haim Moshe's music became popular not only with Israelis, but also with Arabs in surrounding countries. He began to receive fan mail from young people in Syria and throughout the region, and it was even rumored that during the 1982 Lebanon War, the Israeli and Syrian armies were both listening to his "Linda." He became a positive symbol of Israel within the Arab world, and of Mizrahi culture within Israel. He has been "a bridge between East and West in Israel", predicting that "In another twenty years this music will be known as the real Israeli music – not eastern or western but the authentic sound."

== Discography ==
Moshe has released 35 albums, not including collections. Some of the best known are:

- Ahavat Hayay, 1983 (Love of My Life, Hebrew: אהבת חיי)
- Hakolot shel Piraeus, 1990 (Voices of Piraeus, Hebrew: הקולות של פיראוס)
- Etmol, 1995 (Yesterday, Hebrew: אתמול)
- Hatmonot SheBa'albom, 1998 (Pictures in an Album, Hebrew: התמונות שבאלבום)
- Od Shana Chalfa, 2000 (Another Year Has Passed, Hebrew: עוד שנה חלפה)
- Emtza Hachayim, 2001 (In the Middle of Life, Hebrew: אמצע החיים)

== Grenade attack ==
On 8 February 2010, an explosive device was thrown at his Ramat Hasharon home. There were no reports of injuries or damage.

== See also ==
- Mizrahi Music
- Music in Israel
