= Avihu Medina =

Israeli musical artist

Avihu Medina אביהו מדינה
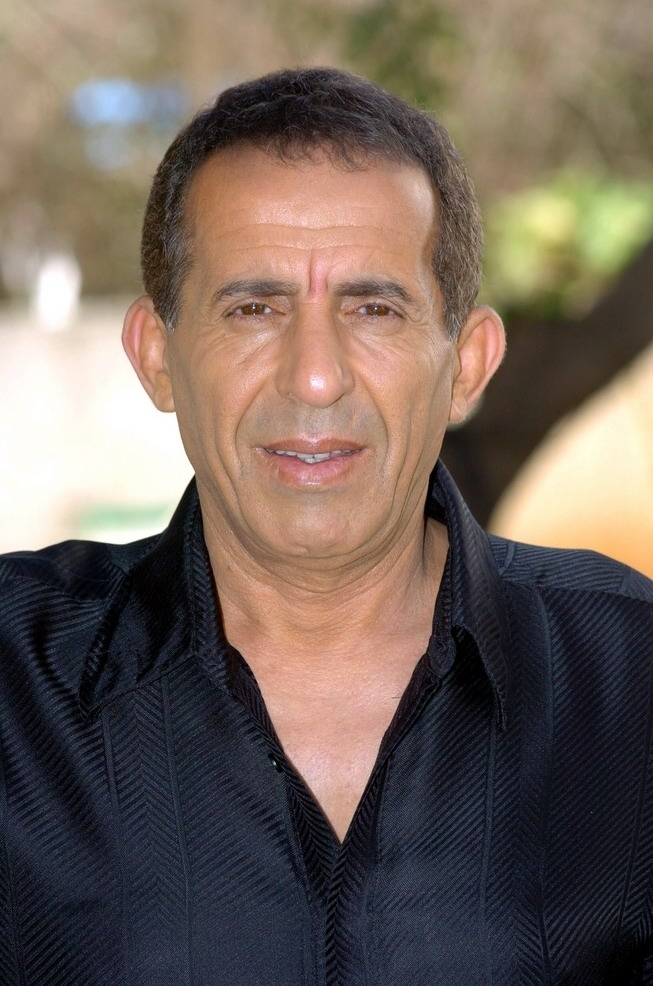

Background information
- Born: September 19, 1948 (age 77); Tel Aviv, Israel
- Genres: Mizrahi music
- Occupations: Composer, arranger, songwriter, and singer
- Website: www.hebrewsongs.com/artists-avihumedina.htm

Avihu Medina (Hebrew: אביהו מדינה; born August 19, 1948, in Tel Aviv) is an Israeli composer, arranger, songwriter, and singer of Mizrahi music.

== Biography ==
Medina was born in Tel Aviv. He was the third son of Aaron and Leah Medina. His mother's family immigrated from Yemen in 1906 and she was born in Jerusalem, and his father immigrated from Yemen in 1939 when it was under the British Mandate. He is Jewish, and his father was a cantor.

As a teenager he lived on Kibbutz Kissufim. He served as a tank commander in the Israel Defense Forces. In the 1980s he established a diamond polishing business.

Avihu is a resident of Petah Tikva.

== Music career ==
Avihu has composed more than 401 Mizrachi music songs. Through 2007, he had released nine albums. He is considered by some to be the best-known Mizrahi singer, and has composed many of Zohar Argov's songs.

== Honors ==
In 2015 Medina was honored as one of the torchbearers in the national Israeli Independence Day ceremony.
