= Eyal Golan =

Israeli singer

Eyal Golan אייל גולן
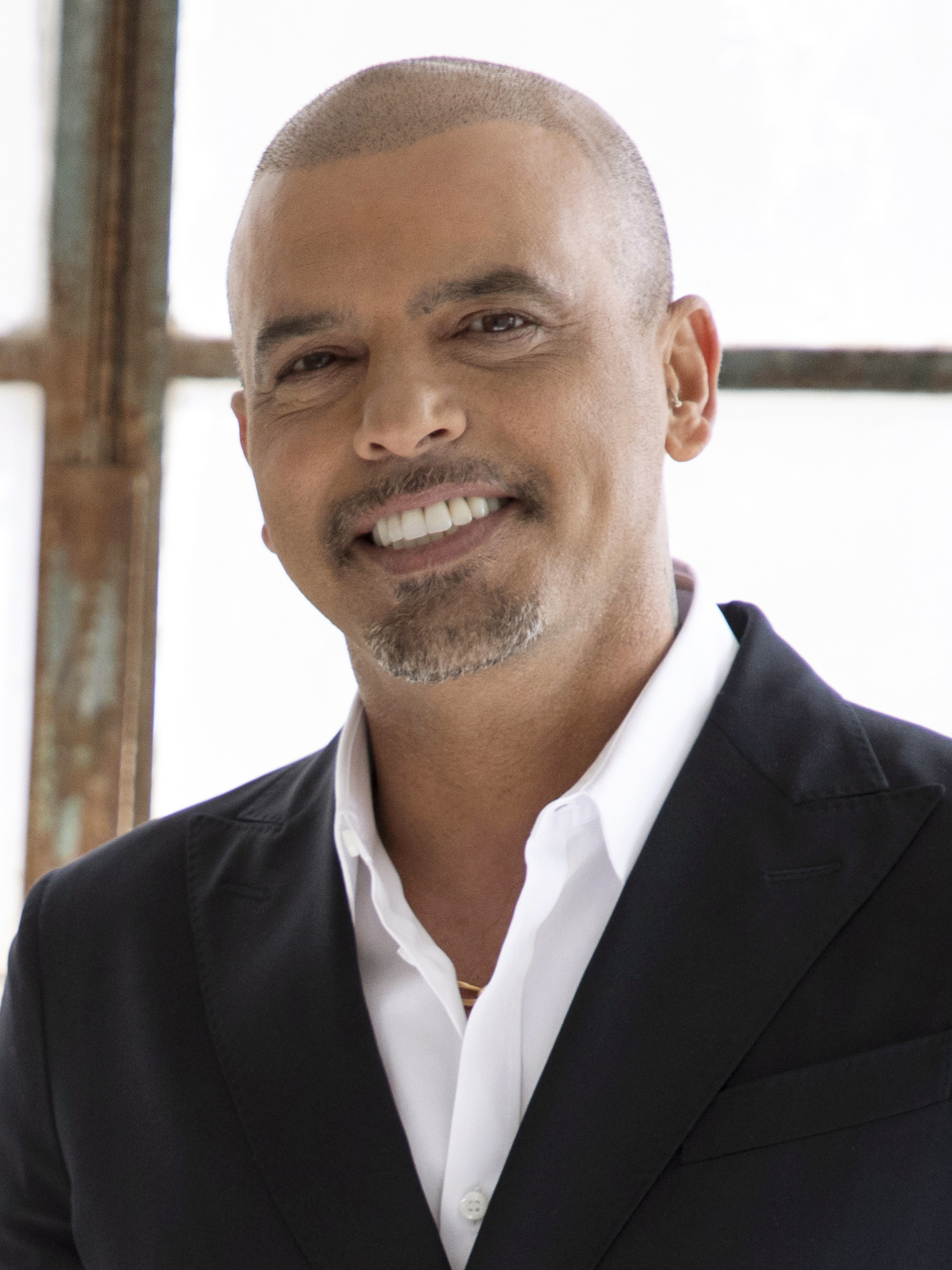
- Eyal Golan in 2022

Background information
- Born: Eyal Bitton; 12 April 1971 (age 55); Rehovot, Israel
- Origin: Rehovot, Israel
- Genres: Mizrahi music, pop
- Occupation: Singer
- Instrument: Vocals
- Years active: 1989–present

YouTube information
- Years active: 2009–present
- Genre: Music
- Subscribers: 1.4 million
- Views: 2.5 billion
- Last updated: 29 March 2025

Eyal Golan (Hebrew: אייל גולן; born Eyal Bitton; 12 April 1971) is an Israeli singer who sings in the Mizrahi music pop fusion genre and considered one of the most successful singers in Israel. Golan reported the highest income of all singers in Israel in 2011.

== Early life ==
Eyal Bitton was born in Rehovot, Israel, to a family of both Moroccan Jewish and Yemenite Jewish descent. His parents are Daniel "Dani" Bitton and Ronit (nee Jamil) and grew up in the neighborhood of Kfar Marmorek in his hometown. When he was 4 his parents divorced and he lived with his mother's family.

== Music career ==
Golan's first album, Lehisha ba'Laila, was released in 1995 and was followed a recording of a live performance featuring cover songs.

In 1996 began working with the Israeli band "Ethnix", who describe themselves as "mixing new wave music with oriental melodies." This partnership lasted until 2000.

For the majority of his career Golan was managed by record producer Ishai Ben Zur, until their professional relationship ended due to financial disputes.

Golan regularly tours in Israel and has occasionally performed abroad.

He was a judge for the first half of the 2018 season of the Israeli talent show Rising Star.

== Television: Eyal Golan Is Calling You ==
On 20 February 2011, Eyal Golan introduced a new reality show on Israeli Music 24 called Eyal Golan Is Calling You (in Hebrew אייל גולן קורא לך) where he is searching for the next Mizrahi music singer together with Yosi Ganj, Adi Leon and Yaron Elan. The show lasted two seasons.

== Controversies ==
=== Statutory rape allegations ===
In November 2013, Golan was arrested as part of a group of men suspected of having sex with underage girls. Golan denied the charges, but admitted that his father, Danny Biton, had brought girls to his home to have sex with him. Although the charges against Golan were later dropped for lack of evidence, the allegations caused Golan's songs to receive less radio airplay and for performances to be cancelled. Eyal's father was later convicted in 2015 of procuring minors for the purposes of prostitution. The indictment stated that he "systematically arranged meetings between his son, singer Eyal Golan, and young female fans" in order to carry out his crimes.

In December 2018, Golan was recognized by the Knesset, but many MKs and women's groups expressed anger that he would be honored. Protesters interrupted the event, but were removed by security before Golan performed a duet with MK Nava Boker, the chairwoman of the Knesset Caucus for Hebrew Music.

"After a massive backlash, Eyal Golan’s performance at the (early 2025) Eilat Women’s Festival has been canceled, the event’s management announced ..."

=== Tax evasion ===
In 2014, Golan pleaded guilty of evading 2.6 million NIS worth of taxes. He was sentenced to 4 months of community service and ordered to pay a fine of 75,000 NIS.

=== Gaza war comments ===
On 15 October 2023, Golan stated on Israeli TV Channel 14, "Erase Gaza completely, don’t leave a single person there." In August 2024, Israeli authorities recommended bringing charges against Golan for "incitement to violence". His personal comments have been cited as evidence for genocide in South Africa's genocide case against Israel at the International Court of Justice.

== Discography ==
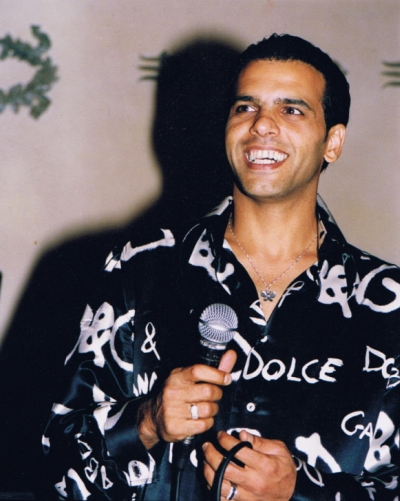

Studio albums

- 1995 – Lechisha Ba'Layla – לחישה בלילה (A Whisper in the Night)
- 1997 – Biladaich – בלעדייך (Without You)
- 1998 – Chayal Shel Ahavah – חייל של אהבה (Soldier of Love)
- 1999 – Histakli Elay – הסתכלי אלי (Look at Me)
- 2001 – Tzlil Meytar – צליל מיתר (String sound)
- 2002 – v'Ani Kore Lach – ואני קורא לך (And I Call You)
- 2003 – Chalomot – חלומות – (Dreams)
- 2005 – Metziut Acheret – מציאות אחרת (A Different Reality)
- 2007 – Bishvilech Notzarti – בשבילך נוצרתי (I Was Made For You)
- 2008 – Hoze Otach Muli – הוזה אותך מולי (Imagining You Facing Me)
- 2009 – Ze Ani – זה אני (That's Me)
- 2010 – Derech LaChayim – דרך לחיים (A Way of Life)
- 2011 – Chelek Michayay – חלק מחיי (Part of My Life)
- 2012 – Nagaat Li Balev – נגעת לי בלב (You touched my heart)
- 2013 – Halev Al Hashulchan – הלב על השולחן (The heart is on the table)
- 2014 – Yamim Yagidu – ימים יגידו (Time will tell)
- 2015 – Besof Kol Yom – בסוף כל יום (At the End of Every Day)
- 2016 – Rachok Mikan – רחוק מכאן (Far away from here)
- 2017 – Lo Pashut Lihiot Pashut – לא פשוט להיות פשוט (It is not simple to be simple)
- 2017 – Osef Meshulash – אוסף משולש (Triple Collection)
- 2018 – Nakhon Letamid – נכון לתמיד (Right forever), covers album and tribute to Zohar Argov.
- 2019 – Hafokh Mehayekum – הפוך מהיקום (Upside down from the universe)
- 2020 – Mikan v'Ad Hanetsach - מכאן ועד הנצח (From here to eternity)
- 2021 – Lihiot Meushar - להיות מאושר (To Be Happy)
- 2021 – Ketzev Mizrahi - קצב מזרחי (Eastern Rhythm)
- 2022 – Ktzat Same'ach Ktzat Atzuv - קצת שמח קצת עצוב (A Little Happy A little Sad)
- 2023 – 2023
- 2024 – Am Israel Chai - עם ישראל חי (The People Of Israel Lives)
- 2025 – Ahava Menatzachat Hakol - אהבה מנצחת הכל (Love Wins Everything)
- 2026 – 30

Live albums

- 1996 – BeHofa'a Haya – בהופעה חיה (Live in Concert)
- 2000 – haMofa'a haMeshoutaf: Ethnix v'Eyal Golan – המופע המשותף עם אתניקס (The Duet Concert of Ethnix and Eyal Golan)
- 2008 – Eyal Golan Baheichal Hatarbut – אייל גולן בהיכל התרבות (Eyal Golan Live at Heichal Hatarbut (also on DVD)
- 2009 – Eyal Golan Caesarea (2009)
- 2010 – Eyal Golan at Nokia Arena (2011)
- 2011 – Eyal Golan part of my life Live the Sultan's Pool (2012)
- 2012 – Eyal Golan Caesarea (You touched my heart)
- 2013 – Eyal Golan Caesarea (The heart is on the table)
- 2016 – Eyal Golan With Ma Kasur Live In Caesarea (2016)

== See also ==
- Mizrahi Music
- List of Israeli musical artists
