= Carmen Elmakiyes =

Israeli Social and political activist, medical clown, and filmmaker (born 1979)

Carmen Elmakiyes Amos כרמן אלמקייס עמוס
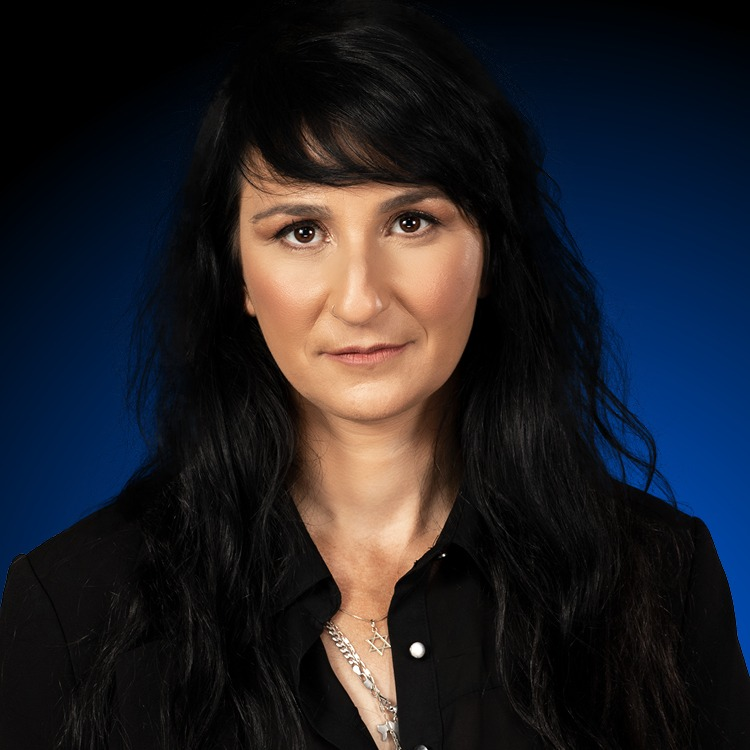
- Elmakiyes in 2019
- Born: February 17, 1979 (age 47); Ashkelon, Israel
- Occupations: Filmmaker, activist, medical clown
- Political party: Gesher

Carmen Elmakiyes Amos (Hebrew: כרמן אלמקייס עמוס; born February 17, 1979) is an Israeli social and political activist, medical clown, and filmmaker. She is a founder of the "Not Nice" social movement, of the Tor Hazahav (Golden Age) Mizrahi political movement. In April 2019, she ran in the national elections for the Knesset as a candidate for the Gesher party, led by Orly Levy-Abekasis.

== Early life and family ==
Elmakiyes was born in Ashkelon, to Michael Elmakiyes and Rina Amos. Her father was a Moroccan Mizrahi social activist, who participated in the Wadi Salib riots and was a founder of the 1992 Gesher political party, and former candidate for the Knesset. Her mother is a seamstress. Both are immigrants to Israel from Morocco. Elmakiyes is one of their eight biological children, and they adopted another child as well. Elmakiyes grew up in the distressed "Shikunim" Neighborhood of Ashkelon, which was nicknamed "Harlem" by its residents. In elementary school, she attended local, religious, Rambam Elementary, but in middle school she was transferred to Ronson, a regional integration project, where she felt out of place. When it was time for high school, it was decided to send her to Ort Negev, a trade high school, where she was intended to learn to be a child caregiver. Even at her young age, she realized that all the Mizrahi youngsters were being sent to trade schools to learn to be hairdressers or electricians, while the Ashkenazi teens were sent to college preparatory schools. She decided not to cooperate, and dropped out of school at age 16. She eventually competed the matriculation exams on her own, and went on to higher education in the arts, her desired field. Elmakiyes completed her undergraduate degree in film at the Kinneret Academic College.

When she was 17, Elmakiyes moved to Tel Aviv, to live with her older sister, and began working in a shop near Dizengoff Center. One day in 1994, while waiting in line at the ATM, a bomb went off, and Elmakiyes was thrown back several meters. It was the Dizengoff Center suicide bombing, a suicide terrorist attack, in which 14 people were killed and over 120 wounded. Elmakiyes was lightly wounded, but suffered extreme trauma from the experience and what she witnessed. Her rehabilitation took several years, also releasing her from mandatory military service. She says, "It was a complicated time, which took me far off the normal path. I wasn't severely wounded, but seeing children explode before your eyes is an indescribable horror. I will never forget it, these are things that stay with you for life." It was only after she completed rehabilitation that she was able to pursue her education. In addition to her degree in filmmaking, Elmakiyes completed several other courses in the arts, including learning to be a medical clown.

== Social activism ==
Elmakiyes began her activism in the Mizrahi feminist movement, Ahoti – for Women in Israel. After two years of volunteering, she was appointed project manager for the Libi BaMizrach Coalition (My Heart Is in the East), an umbrella group for over thirty Mizrahi cultural organizations. As part of this multi-cultural project, the "Black Night of Culture" are held every year as a protest against the municipality of Tel Aviv's "White Night of Culture", which takes place in the wealthier, largely white Ashkenazi neighborhoods, and which seeks to shine a spotlight on the neglect, crime, pollution, drug trade and other issues relegated to the mostly Mizrahi and African neighborhoods of South Tel Aviv. She is a producer together with Shula Keshet, and on the steering committee of Libi BaMizrah's annual culture festival.

In 2011, Elmakiyes was one of the founder of the "Not Nice" movement, a group of activists from Mizrahi neighborhoods who organized to get Mizrahi issues on the public agenda. The group's goals are to reduce class social and class gaps, improve public housing and deal with the housing shortage in Israel, and to eliminate poverty. Elmakiyes and other group members are highly visible in demonstrations, guerrilla street action (such as changing street names to Mizrahi names), and other forms of protest. The name of the movement is a reclamation of a famous quote by then-prime minister Golda Meir about the Black Panther Mizrahi social justice movement of the 1970s, who dismissed them out of hand, saying, "They’re not nice."

Elmakiyes is often referred to in the press as "The Black Panther[ess]", because of her vocal, non-compromising protest style, her refusal to back down, and her own identification with the Israeli Black Panther movement.

In 2013, Elmakiyes was arrested together with social activist Sapir Slutsker-Amran at a demonstration against cutting child allowances and other austerity measures that impacted the poorer classes. The protest was mounted in front of then Minister of Finance, Yair Lapid's house. In the course of the violent arrest, Elmakiyes was wounded. She filed a complaint against the policeman who kicked her, citing sexual harassment and battery. Shortly after her release from jail, she initiated a special session in the Knesset of the Internal Affairs and Environment Committee, in which several women members of the Knesset (MKs) participated, and in which she called for feminist activists from all ends of the political spectrum to give testimony about police violence towards female protesters. Elmakiyes then led several demonstrations against police brutality.

In 2014, Elmakiyes and the "Not Nice" group began acting against evictions of residents of Givat Amal Bet, in Tel Aviv. Group members fortified themselves in local dwellings in order to prevent the evictions, and held protests outside the homes of real estate developers and business tycoons Yitzhak Tshuva and the Kozinhoff family. Elmakiyes and other activists were beaten and arrested. Elmakiyes repeated the squatting tactic in 2015, when she and a single mother of six on the housing wait-list shut themselves in the Amidar offices, demanding immediate housing.

At another session of the Knesset's Internal Affairs and Environment Committee, Elmakiyes arrived with a group of women without homes who were on the waiting list for public housing, who came in and disrupted the proceedings. In 2016, she created short videos of testimony by women in public housing about the continual sexual harassment they face by Amidar (private company that handles public housing) field agents. MK Orly Levy-Abakesis participated in the production, and the films were released to the press. As a result, a special commission was appointed at Amidar to investigate the issue.

Her work on the subject of public housing has been at the forefront of her Activism since 2012, working with some of the other leading activists for this issue, including Ricki Cohen Benlulu, Avigail Biton, and Meital Cohen. She has led and participated in protest in front of the homes of the prime minister, the housing minister, Amidar executives, and more; they have taken their issues to the print and broadcast press, and repeatedly raised the subject in Knesset committee meetings. Elmakiyes and members of the "Not Nice" group and other Mizrahi activists have been instrumental in exposing corruption in Amidar, and illegal practices.

In 2018, Elmakiyes created an exhibition of eight portraits of women with testimonials about public housing. The exhibition, called "Leviot" (lionesses), included stories of rape, extortion, and solicitation to prostitution by government officials and housing agents. Elmakiyes explained that when she first started working with women in public housing, she heard about various incidents of harassment, but after a while, she realized it was systemic, and that all the women were harassed, or worse. "The women are entirely at the mercy of a low-level representative of a housing agency, who with a single negative report can take away their home." And, "I realized this is a story that needed to be told. Someone has to be accountable. Some of the women complained, but their cases were closed." The exhibition, produced in cooperation with the Public Housing Forum and MK Orly Levy-Abakesis, showed at the Arab-Jewish Theater in Jaffa.

Elmakiyes is also active in the documentation of past misdeeds toward the Mizrahi community in Israel, in particular the issue of kidnapping and selling of babies and toddlers from Yemeni and other Mizrahi immigrants in the 1950s, and of what is known as "The Ringworm Affair", in which up to 200,000 children (mainly) from Mizrahi background were "treated" with lethal doses of radiation to eliminate ringworm, causing widespread cases of death and eventual cancer. In both cases, archives are sealed or lost, and there is official resistance to releasing information.

In 2020, Elmakiyes and Sapir Sluzker Amran, a human rights attorney and political activist, founded Breaking Walls (Shovrot Kirot), a feminist organization for the advancement of social and economic justice, focusing on poor and marginalized people, such as providing legal support for those falling into the trap of the criminalization of poverty, who have been increasingly impacted by the COVID-19 crisis.

== Political activism ==
In 2016, Elmakiyes, together with Ophir Toubul, Roy Hasan, and other Mizrahi activists, founded the political group Tor Hazahav (the golden age). The group's goals include raising social and political issues affecting Mizrahim before the legislature, and ensuring representation to their marginalized communities.

In January 2019, Elmakiyes joined the new Gesher political party, headed by Orly Levy-Abekasis. Heading into the April 9, 2019 elections, Elmakiyes was at number 6 on the party list. The party did not receive the required number of votes to enter the Knesset. However, new elections were announced when no party was able to form a government. In August 2019, Gesher united with the Amir Peretz' Labor party, and Elmakiyes is number 10 on the unified list, one of only three Gesher candidates. This unification is seen as an attempt to court the Mizrahi vote by the traditionally Ashkenazi Labor movement. Elmakiyes' inclusion on the list did not sit well with all veteran Labor voters, and shortly after the announcement several social media posts, which included racist epithets against her and her compatriots, went viral, and engaged the public and media for several days.

Elmakiyes was one of the leaders of the movement to release Yonathan Hilo from prison. Hilo was convicted of murder and sentenced to 20 years in prison and financial reparations for killing a man who repeatedly raped him. After multiple unsuccessful appeals, Hilo was released by the clemency board after serving eight years.

She is also at the forefront of the "Free Avera" movement to release and return Avera Mengistu from Hamas captivity. According to Elmakiyes and other political activists, the government and media have barely addressed the issue of Mengistu's capture, alleging that it is because he is black, of Ethiopian heritage; this, as opposed to the similar case of Gilad Shalit, for whom the entire country – the public, the government, and the media – literally went to war.

In August 2019, Elmakiyes was listed as number ten on the unified Labor-Gesher list for the September 2019 elections. Her placement on the list was met with criticism by veteran Labor members, due to her past public critiques of the Ashkenazi political and social hegemony. The media furor that followed raised accusations of racism, that the criticism was because of the relatively large number of Mizrahi candidates on the list with the addition of Elmakiyes and Orly Levy-Abekasis, as well as counter-accusations that Elmakiyes is "anti-Ashkenazi". Elmakiyes stated that her problem is specifically with racists, and not Ashkenazim as a group.

== Media and art ==
- 2014 – Appeared as a commentator on the television program "Hakol Kalul", on channel 10.
- 2014 – Invited to participate in a women's documentary filmmaking laboratory sponsored by the New Fund for Film and Television.
- 2015 – Featured in a chapter of Nevi'im, a series of documentary films about Mizrahi social and political activists.
- 2015 – The Dutch broadcast authority produced a film about activist from different places in the world. Elmakiyes and Stav Shafir from Israel were featured.
- 2017 – "Koach Lakehila" (power to the community) collective launched an exhibit called "Nashim Bamerkhav" (Women in the space), which included art displayed in the streets – on message boards, electricity poles, building walls and so on. The purpose was to provide presence and representation to the diverse women of the distressed neighborhoods of south Tel Aviv. Several photo portraits by Elmakias were included in the exhibition.
- 2018 – "Leviot", photo exhibition of portraits and testimonials of women in the public housing system.
- 2019 – "Al Tashlikheni" (do not discard me), photo portrait exhibition of Holocaust survivors in Israel, and documentation of their harsh living conditions

== Recognition ==
In 2017, Elmakiyes was profiled in the weekly Time Out column of the same name as one of the "People Who Make Tel Aviv".

In March 2018, Elmakiyes was recognized by Lady Globes magazine as one of the 20 leading activists in Israel.

In December 2020, Forbes magazine selected Elmakiyes, together with her partner in Breaking Walls, Sapir Sluzker Amran, to the PowerWomen 2020 list of 50 of Israel's most influential women.

== Personal life ==
Elmakiyes defines herself as "Mizrahi, woman, lesbian, religious". She says that the identity that is relevant and at the forefront depends on the issue at hand. She is in a long-term relationship. In December 2018, Elmakiyes gave birth to her daughter, Emmanuelle Renee.
