= Operation Magic Carpet (Yemen) =

1948–1950 transfer of Yemeni Jews to Israel

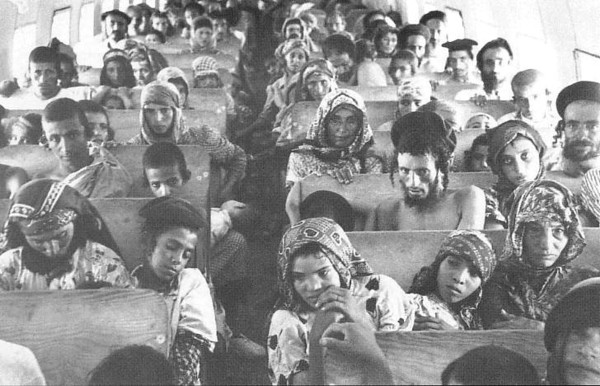
Yemenite Jews en route to Israel from Aden

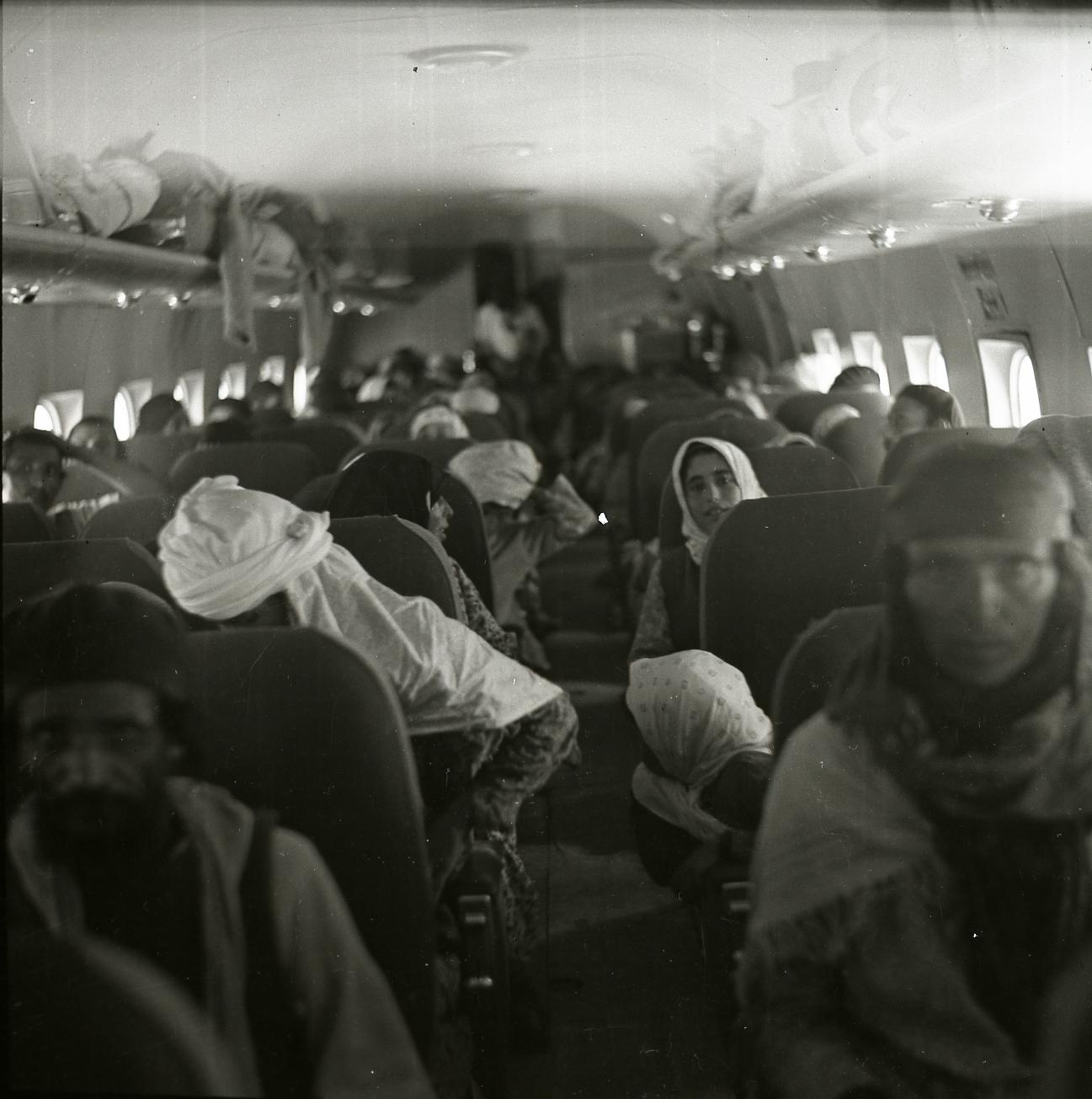
Yemenite Jews on an aeroplane

Operation Magic Carpet is the widely known nickname for Operation On Wings of Eagles (Hebrew: כנפי נשרים Kanfe Nesharim), which was conducted by Israel between 16 December 1948 and 24 September 1950 to take in approximately 49,000 Yemenite Jews as part of the Jewish exodus from the Muslim world. The name derives from the biblical image of Israel being carried "on eagles' wings" (Exodus 19:4 and Isaiah 40:31). With support from the United Kingdom and the United States, the majority of Jews in Yemen—as well as 500 Jews in Djibouti and Eritrea and some 2,000 Jews in Saudi Arabia—were brought to Israel. British and American transport planes (with Alaska Airlines as a major participant) made hundreds of flights from Aden Colony to facilitate the airlift.

At the time, the Kingdom of Yemen comprised what would, in the future, be known as North Yemen. The UK controlled the Crown Colony of Aden, which would later become known as South Yemen. In 1990, North and South Yemen united to create the country known today as Yemen. Thus, the "Yemen" of 1948 was only a portion of the country known today as Yemen.

== Background ==
The Jews of Yemen were one of the oldest communities of the Jewish diaspora and have been settled in the region since antiquity. They lived under Islamic rule as dhimmis and over the centuries they faced recurring persecution and legal disadvantages.

Under the Zaydi imamate, the Orphans' Decree required that Jewish orphans be converted to Islam drawing on 18th-century Zaydi legal interpretations. It was reinforced in the 20th century and most recorded cases occurred in the 1920s under Imam Yahya (reigned 1918–1948).

The community nevertheless sustained a deep religious basis for return to the Land of Israel and Yemenite Jews were among the earliest Zionist immigrants to Palestine. From the 1880s, Yemenite Jews began emigrating to Ottoman and later Mandatory Palestine in intermittent waves, the first group arriving in 1882. In 1911 a Zionist emissary, Shmuel Yavnieli, travelled through Yemen and urged the community to leave for Palestine. Imam Yahya prohibited Jewish emigration, but Yemenite Jews continued to leave by way of British-ruled Aden.

Emigration continued despite the ban. Over the course of the British Mandate more than 15,000 Yemenite Jews immigrated to Palestine and by the outbreak of World War II some 28,000 lived among the Yishuv.

The principal gateway for Yemenite Jews bound for Palestine was Aden, a British-ruled territory (formerly the Aden Settlement, then the Aden Province) that became the separate Crown Colony of Aden in 1937 and was administered apart from the Imamate of Yemen. The immigration limits imposed by the British White Paper of 1939 turned Aden into a bottleneck and refugees built up in the colony with dimming prospects of continuing on to Palestine. Only a handful reached Palestine in the last years of the Mandate, with 55 Yemenite Jews entering in 1946, 50 in 1947 and 54 in the first ten months of 1948.

From 1946 the American Jewish Joint Distribution Committee (JDC) organised relief among the stranded refugees and in 1947 it set up camps for them at Sheikh Othman and Geula, near Aden town. Britain, as the governing power in Aden, was anxious to be rid of the growing number of stranded Jewish refugees.

The announcement of the United Nations Partition Plan for Palestine in November 1947 was followed days later by anti-Jewish riots in Aden. More than 80 Jews were killed and Jewish property was destroyed.

In February 1948 Imam Yahya was assassinated in a coup, and after a brief upheaval his son Ahmad established himself as ruler by March 1948. That May the State of Israel was founded, giving the prospective emigrants both a destination and a state able to grant visas and arrange their absorption. The airlift began while the 1948 Arab–Israeli War was still under way and would continue after the fighting concluded.

Violence also recurred within Yemen itself, where in 1948 the Jewish quarter of the town of Dhamar was looted after rumours that Jews had killed two girls. Recurring harassment and violence influenced Jews across Yemen to emigrate in larger and more frequent waves. In 1949, Ahmad reversed the long-standing ban on emigration and allowed the Jews of Yemen to leave.

On the eve of Operation Magic Carpet an estimated 40,000 to 50,000 Jews remained in Yemen itself, while the neighbouring Aden Colony, which would serve as the airlift's staging point, had its own long-established Jewish community, concentrated in the Crater quarter of Aden town. By late 1948 thousands of Yemenite refugees had gathered in the JDC-run Hashed transit camp near Aden, setting the stage for the airlift that followed.

== Motives and preparation ==
The Jewish Agency's emissary, Rabbi Yaakov Shraibom, was sent in 1949 to Yemen and discovered that there were around 50,000 Jews living in Yemen, which was unknown at the time to Israel. He sent multiple letters to convey the community's strong religious and messianic desire to come to Israel. David Ben-Gurion was reluctant at first, but he came around eventually.

Esther Meir-Glitzenstein showed evidence how the community's sentiment for aliyah played a part in the exodus, the extent of which surprised even the Jewish state and the agency in charge of the operation, who were not prepared for the mass of Jews who were fleeing Yemen. Once he realized that, Shraibom tried to prevent the coming crisis and urged the community to stay in Yemen, but the sentiment of the community for aliyah was stronger and they came nonetheless.

Meir-Glitzenstein also claims that collusion between Israel and the Imam of Yemen who "profited hugely from confiscatory taxes levied on the Jewish community" led to a botched operation in which the Jewish community suffered terribly. Reuven Ahroni and Tudor Parfitt argue that economic motivations also had a role in the massive emigration of Yemeni Jews, which began prior to 1948.

Tudor Parfitt described the reasons for the exodus as multi-faceted, some aspects due to Zionism and others more historically based:

economic straits as their traditional role was whittled away, famine, disease, growing political persecution, and increased public hostility, the state of anarchy after the murder of Yahya, often a desire to be reunited with family members, incitement and encouragement to leave from those who played on their religious sensibilities, promises that their passage would be paid to Israel and that their material difficulties would be cared for by the Jewish state, a sense that the Land of Israel was a veritable Eldorado, a sense of history being fulfilled, a fear of missing the boat, a sense that living wretchedly as dhimmis in an Islamic state was no longer God-ordained, a sense that as a people, they had been flayed by history long enough: All these played a role. ... Purely religious, messianic sentiment, too, had its part, but by and large, this has been over-emphasised.

== Operation ==
"Magic Carpet" was the first of a series of Israeli operations to aid Jewish emigration from Muslim lands. The airlift was directed by James Wooten, president of Alaska Airlines, whose aircraft flew the charter flights from Aden, some of which Wooten piloted himself.

Thousands of Yemenite refugees had gathered in the Hashed transit camp in Aden with support from the American Jewish Joint Distribution Committee. With sea passage through the Suez Canal closed to Israel-bound ships, the Joint Distribution Committee took over the task of moving them out of Aden by air, and the Israeli government made 3,500 immigration visas available.

The airlift used chartered American aircraft that Alaska Airlines, a civilian carrier, had acquired as war-surplus military transports: Douglas DC-4s (the civilian designation of the wartime C-54 Skymaster) and Curtiss C-46 Commandos. On a 1,760 miles (2,830 km) non-stop flight of about eight hours, the planes crossed Yemen but skirted Saudi Arabia, Egypt and Transjordan, and they were fired on from the ground seven times, one aircraft being hit in the tail. A refueling station had to be set up at Asmara in Eritrea, about 500 miles (800 km) from Aden. In August 1949, after the United States government acted against Alaska Airlines, Wooten and the pilot Robert Maguire formed a new carrier, Near East Air Transport, to keep the flights going. Its aircraft, refitted with wooden benches in place of upholstered seats, carried between 125 and 145 of the underweight refugees per flight in place of the usual 56.

The airlift unfolded in three stages. In the first, from December 1948 to March–April 1949, roughly 7,000 Yemenite and Adeni Jews were flown to Israel. The first flight carried fifty orphans out of Aden aboard a Douglas DC-3 on 16 December 1948. Thereafter groups of 70 to 117 people were trucked almost daily to the Aden airport under armed guard, and by the end of February 1949 some 4,500 refugees had been flown out. Although The Palestine Post reported the airlift in detail that month under the headline "Magic Carpet", the first phase drew little public attention, and the operation's name made little impact until it was publicly announced later in the year.

The main wave came in the second stage, from July to November 1949, when some 30,000 Yemenites were flown to Israel. This far larger movement had not been made public, thanks to cooperation between the Israeli censor and the Israeli and foreign press, out of concern for the welfare of the refugees gathered in Aden. A few reports had appeared in the foreign press, but they were toned down and not widely picked up. The airlift reached its peak in September, and it was disclosed only on 7 November 1949, when leaders of the Joint Distribution Committee announced it to the media, a decision the JDC attributed to a forthcoming New York Herald Tribune report by the journalist Ruth Gruber. The Palestine Post then reported on its front page that the entire Yemenite Jewish community was being transferred to Israel.

A third and final stage continued through 1950. The operation ended on 24 September 1950, when the last two aircraft reached Lydda Airport with 177 passengers. In all it comprised some 430 flights covering more than 1.3 million miles at a transport cost exceeding US$4 million, and a monument was raised at the Jewish cemetery in Aden to about 700 refugees who had died there.

The operation continues to be widely celebrated among Israelis. Kanfei Nesharim Street in Jerusalem is named for it, as well as a street in Herzliya, one in Ramat Gan, and another in Kerem HaTeimanim, which is a neighbourhood of Tel Aviv that was established by Yemenite Jews in 1906.

== Criticism ==
Esther Meir-Glitzenstein criticized the execution of the operation. She especially criticized the American Jewish Joint Distribution Committee and Israel, which, according to her, abandoned thousands of Jews in the deserts on the border between North Yemen and Aden. Mismanagement or corruption by the British authorities and the Jewish Agency also played a role. Some 850 Yemenite Jews died en route to their departure points, and in the community which reached Israel, infant mortality rates were high, albeit lower than in Yemen.

According to Ben-Gurion's diary, the Yemeni children in the Israeli ma'abarot or tent transit camps were dying like flies. Children were often separated from their parents for hygienic reasons, or taken away to hospitals for treatment, but often, parents only received notification, often by loudspeaker, they had died. According to some testimony, there was a suspicion that the state kidnapped healthy Yemeni children, for adoption, and then informed the parents they had died.

As a result, some decades later, the Yemenite Children Affair exploded, in which it was rumoured that something of the order of 1,000 children had gone missing. In a 2019 article in Tablet magazine, Yaacov Lozowick, the former Israel State Archivist, explained the cases of the missing Yemenite babies. There was a very high death rate, and disturbed medical professionals, he said, autopsied some of the bodies to try to find out why. Traditionally, autopsies were forbidden under Jewish law, so this was hidden from the parents. Lozowick wrote that the files contained no evidence of any kidnappings. However, in February 2019, The New York Times published an article in which some of the missing children were found by DNA test by their living relatives. They were given for adoption to Ashkenazi Jewish families.

== Aftermath ==
In 1959, another 3,000 Jews from Aden fled to Israel, while many more left as refugees to the United States and the United Kingdom. The emigration of Yemeni Jews continued as a trickle, but stopped in 1962 when a civil war broke out in North Yemen, which put an abrupt halt to further emigration. In 2013, a total sum of 250 Jews still lived in Yemen.

The Jewish communities in Raydah were shocked by the killing of Moshe Ya'ish al-Nahari in 2008. His wife and nine children emigrated to Israel. Other members of the Jewish community received hate letters and threats by phone. Amnesty International wrote to the Yemeni government, urging the country to protect its Jewish citizens. The human rights organization stated that it is "deeply concerned for the safety of members of the Jewish community in northwestern Yemen following the killing of one member of the community and anonymous serious threats to others to leave Yemen or face death".

It was forbidden for native-born Yemeni Jews who had left the country to re-enter, rendering communication with these communities difficult. Muslims were therefore hired as shelihim (emissaries) to locate the remaining Jews, pay their debts, and transport them to Aden. Little came of this. In August 2020, of an estimated 100 or so remaining Yemen Jews, 42 have migrated to the United Arab Emirates (UAE) and the rest would also leave.

On November 10, 2020, the U.S. State Department called for the immediate and unconditional release of Levi Salem Musa Marhabi, who had been imprisoned for helping smuggle a Torah scroll out of Yemen. A press statement said Marhabi has been wrongfully detained by the Houthi militia for four years, despite a court ordering his release in September 2019.

On 28 March 2021, 13 Jews were forced by the Houthis to leave Yemen, leaving the last four elderly Jews in Yemen. At the time, it was reported that there were six Jews left in Yemen: one woman; her brother; three others, and Levi Salem Marhabi. In March 2022, the United Nations reported that only one Jew remained in Yemen.

== See also ==
- Amka
- Operation Yakhin
- Yemenite Jews in Israel
- Jewish Agency for Israel
- Austerity in Israel
- Ma'abarot
- Yemenite Children Affair
- Ringworm affair
