= Uzi Meshulam =

Israeli rabbi

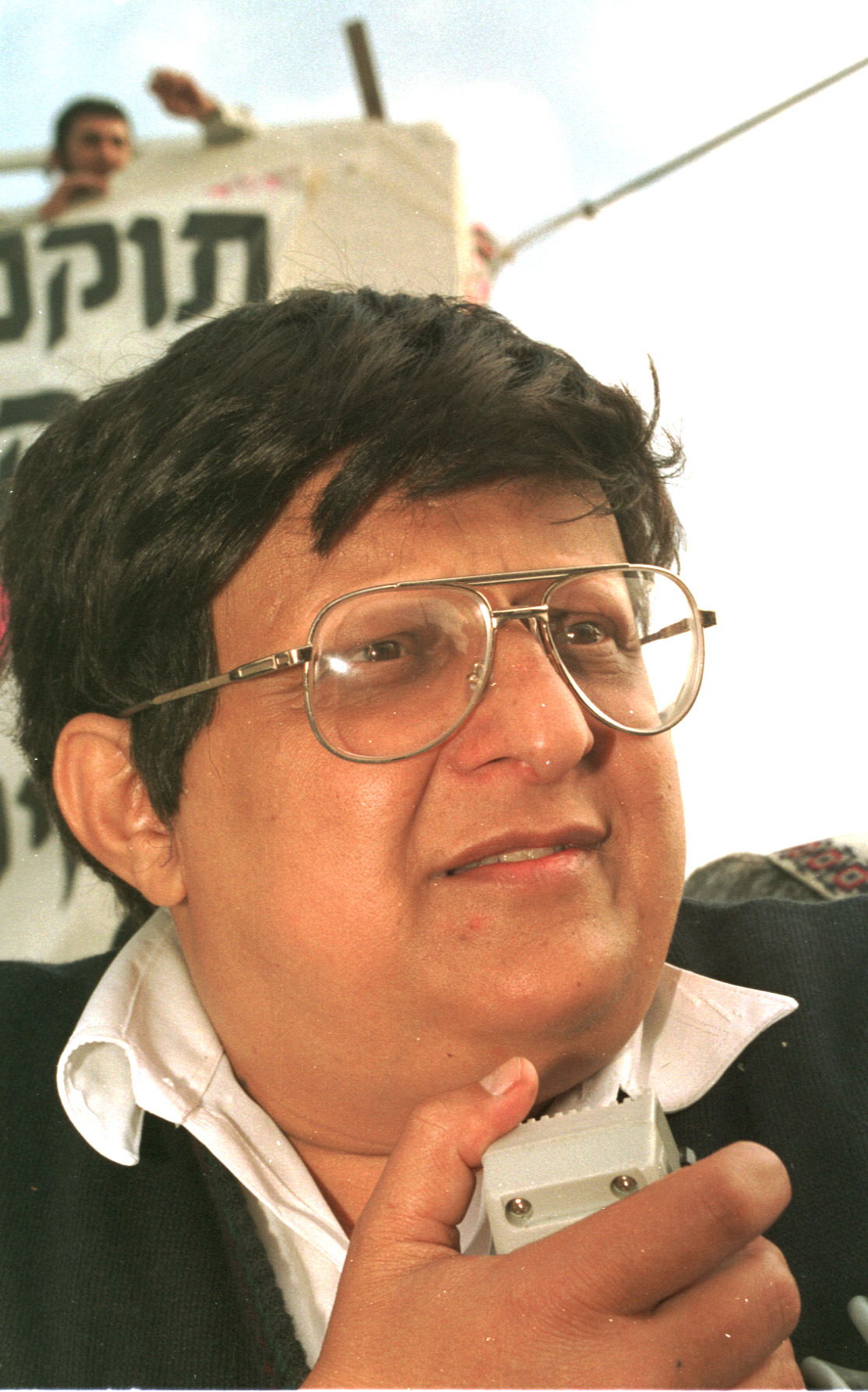
Meshulam at a rally

Uzi Meshulam (Hebrew: עוזי משולם; October 30, 1952 - June 21, 2013) was a Rabbi from Yehud who in 1994 was the leader of a group of Yemenite Jews who resisted Israeli law enforcement authorities.

== Biography ==
At the end of the 1970s Meshulam taught Torah in a religious school and many students gathered around him.

Meshulam became widely known in the affair which began on Passover in 1994. During that time Meshulam distributed pamphlets which described the kidnappings of Jewish Yemenite children and stated that around 4,500 children of Jewish Yemenite immigrants were taken from their parents by the Israeli authorities and given to rich Ashkenazi Jews inside Israel and abroad during the late 1940s and early 1950s while the Yemenite immigrants were falsely told that their babies had died from illness or malnutrition. After a local conflict between Meshulam and a sewer contractor escalated, police forces intervened, and in the stir of the emotions Meshulam and his followers called for a commission of inquiry into the disappearance of the Yemenite children.

Meshulam's followers barricaded his home with sandbags and stones and armed themselves with many weapons. As a result, a large force of police, snipers and a Special Patrol Unit surrounded Meshulam's house for weeks. On May 10, at 3:00 AM, Meshulam left his followers in his home in order to meet with the Police Commissioner Assaf Hefetz. At this point the police forces broke into the house and 11 followers were arrested. One of them, 19-year-old Shlomi Assouline, was killed by the police during the raid.

Meshulam's followers were accused of a number of offenses: conspiracy to commit a crime, obstructing justice, an attempt to injury with serious intent, threats, deliberate risk of human lives, and manufacturing illegal weapons. As a result, Meshulam's followers were sentenced to prison terms of between 15 months to five years. Meshulam himself was convicted of providing instruction to throw Molotov cocktails at police forces and obstruction of justice. He was sentenced to 8 years but was eventually cleared of one of the charges, so that his sentence was reduced to six and a half years, of which he served five years after president Ezer Weizman reduced the term by seven months.

In October 1994 a warden at Meshulam's prison was shot by two of Meshulam's followers, but he eventually survived the attack. The attackers were convicted and sentenced to long prison terms.

Following these events, the Kedmi Commission was established in January 1995. It was headed by a former Supreme Court justice Yehuda Cohen. The Kedmi Commission investigated for nearly 7 years the disappearance cases of the Yemenite immigrants' children between in 1948 - 1954. The committee's report provided explanations for many of the cases of disappearances, but found no evidence of a conspiracy in the matter, although 56 cases are still considered open cases.

In January 1996 Meshulam was transferred to the Shata prison. Shortly after his health worsened and he was hospitalized. His followers continued to protest and call for his release, though the public protests eventually diminished.

In 2016, Prime Minister Benjamin Netanyahu appointed cabinet member Tzachi Hanegbi to re-examine the evidence. Hanegbi told Israeli TV: “They took the children and gave them away. I don’t know where.” He acknowledged that “hundreds” of children were taken without their parents’ consent, the first time such a public admission had been made by a government official.

== Death ==
On June 21, 2013, Meshulam died at the age of 60.
