= Kedmi Commission =

Israeli commission on child abductions

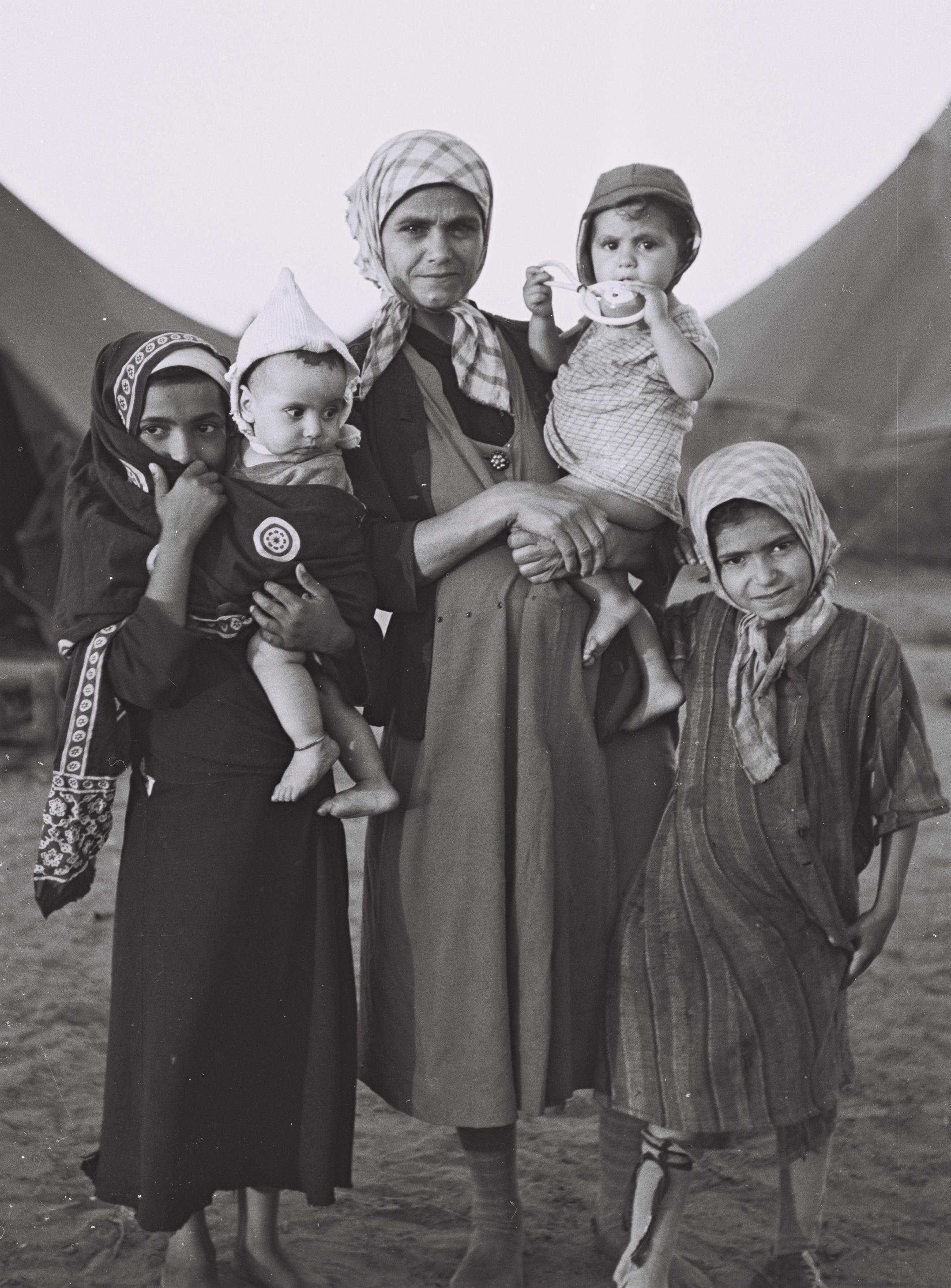
A Jewish Yemenite mother in Aden camp, during Operation Magic Carpet (Yemen).

The Kedmi Commission also known as The Cohen-Kedmi Commission was set up in 1995 during the Israel prime minister Yitzhak Rabin to investigate the missing of hundreds of Jewish infants, most of those belonging to Jews from Yemen who has migrated to the newly created State of Israel between 1948 and 1954 through the Operation Magic Carpet (Yemen).

== History ==
The first reported incident of missing children was publicly reported in 1950, when the Association of Yemenis in Israel demanded the police to investigate the disappearance of hundreds of Yemeni children who were considered dead, but the burial place was not known and death certificates were not issued. The first official investigation The Minkovski-Bahlul Commission was set up in 1967, the commission's findings revealed that it had reviewed 342 cases and according to the Commission, 316 missing children died, 2 were adopted, and the fate of the rest were never known or mentioned in the records. The Yemeni community was dissatisfied with the commissions findings, thus resulted in ordering a second commission in 1988 the Shalgi Commission. The Commission reviewed 301 cases and concluded that most of them had died during and after birth, and could not establish a conclusion of 65 cases.

The Kedmi Commission; was commissioned during the Prime minister Yitzhak Rabin, in the year 1995 (after the unsuccessful conclusion of the Minkovski-Bahlul Commission and the Shalgi Commission) the commission's finding were publicly released in November 2001. Initially the commission was headed by retired Judge Yehuda Cohen as well as two other members retired Judge Dalia Kobel and Major General David Maimon. During March 1999 Yehuda Cohen the head of the commission was legitimately replaced by Supreme Court Judge Yaacov Kedmi, giving it the name the Cohen-Kedmi commission or simply The Kedmi Commission. The commission concluded in its report that most of the children had died of illnesses, while some of those were adopted, the commission also rejected the state sponsored or institutional conspiracy in disappearing of children. A research scholar Shoshana Madmoni-Gerber—( author of "Israeli Media and the Framing of Internal Conflict: the Yemenite Babies Affair, 2009) had concluded in her book with hundreds of testimonies that the disappearance of babies was a state sponsored conspiracy.

In June 2016, Benjamin Netanyahu the Prime Minister of Israel had appointed Tzachi Hanegbi-(in charge of National Security and Foreign Affairs) to reopen the files to discover the truth. According to Washington Post in July 2016, Hanegbi updated media that after looking at material from government inquiries into the matter, he is now sure that hundreds of Yemeni children were taken away from their parents, although he could not say why or where they went. In 2001, the commission published its conclusions. It found that in the state's first 6 years, although as many as 1,000 children may have disappeared, there was no basis to the claim that the establishment abducted babies. Hundreds of thousands of documents relevant to testimonies and evidence were classified for 70 years and will not be available to the public until 2071. The committee examined more than 800 cases, and did not manage to reach absolute conclusions in 56 of these cases. The committee determined that in 750 cases the children actually died. The commission said that 42 children were unaccounted for. In 2001 a seven-year public inquiry commission concluded that the accusations that Yemenite children were kidnapped by the government are not true. The commission unequivocally rejected claims of a plot to take children away from Yemenite immigrants. The report determined that documentation existed showing that 972 of the 1,033 missing children were deceased. Five additional missing babies were found to be alive. The commission was unable to discover what happened in another 56 cases. With regard to these unresolved 56 cases, the commission deemed it "possible" that the children were handed over for adoption following decisions made by individual local social workers, but not as part of an official policy.

== See also ==
- Yemenite Children Affair
- Yemenite Jews in Israel
