= Yemenite Jews in Israel =

Ethnic group

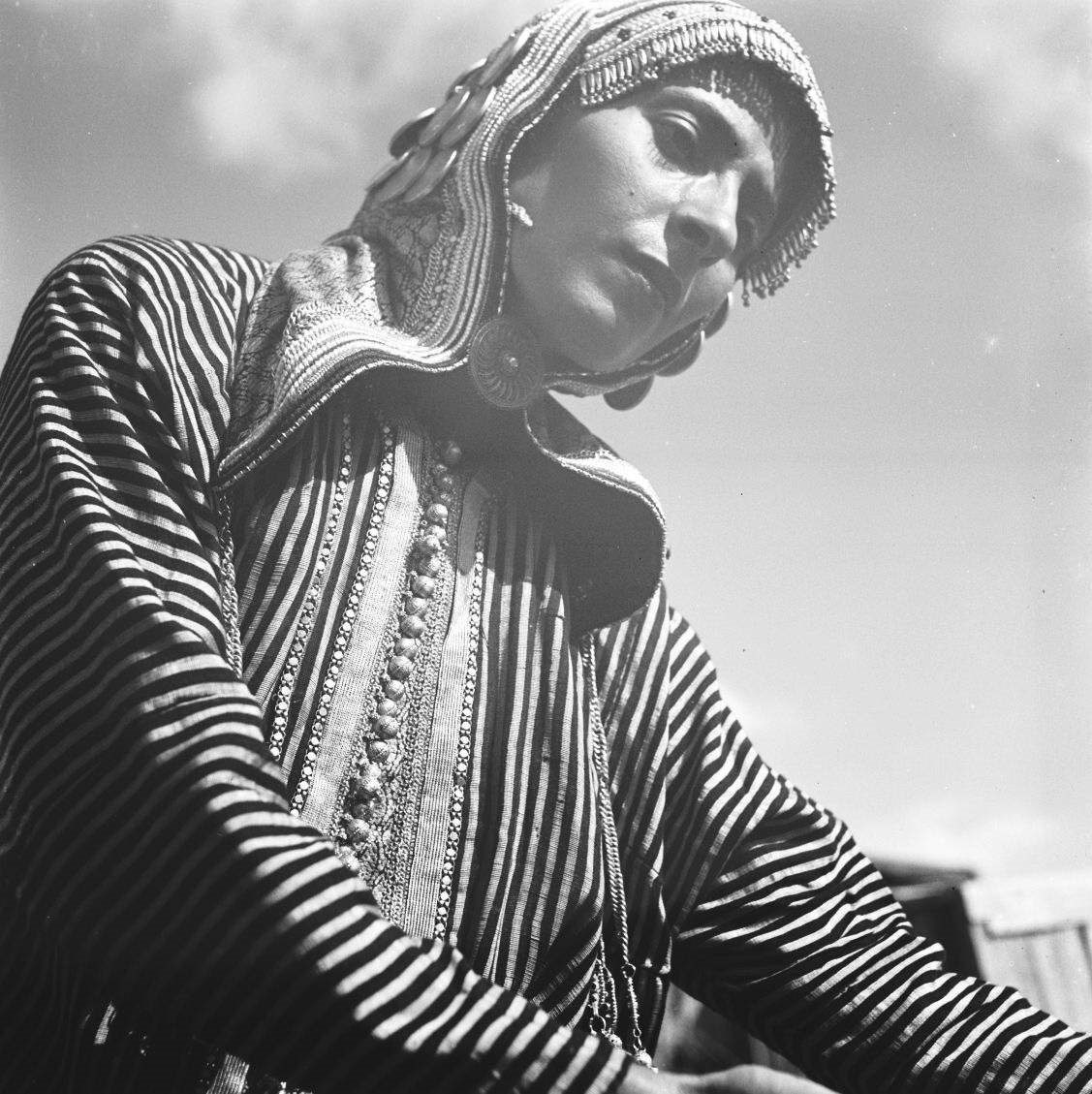

Total population
- 435,000

Regions with significant populations
- Jerusalem, Tel Aviv, Haifa, and many other places.

Languages
- Hebrew (main language of all generations); Arabic (among the older generation); Judeo-Arabic

Religion
- Orthodox Judaism; Non religious Judaism; Judaism

Yemenite Jews in Israel are immigrants and descendants of the immigrants of the Yemenite Jewish communities, who now reside within the state of Israel. They number around 400,000 in the wider definition. Between June 1949 and September 1950, the overwhelming majority of Yemen and Aden's Jewish population was transported to Israel in Operation Magic Carpet.

== History ==
=== First wave of modern emigration: 1881 to 1914 ===
Due to the changes in the Ottoman Empire, citizens could move more freely, and in 1869, travel was improved with the opening of the Suez Canal, which reduced the travel time from Yemen to Ottoman Syria. Certain Yemenite Jews interpreted these changes and the new developments in the "Holy Land" as heavenly signs that the time of redemption was near. By settling in Ottoman Syria, they would play a part in what they believed could precipitate the anticipated messianic era. Emigration from Yemen to the Mutasarrifate of Jerusalem (Ottoman Syria) began in early 1881 and continued almost without interruption until 1914. It was during this time that about 10% of the Yemenite Jews left. From 1881 to 1882, a few hundred Jews left Sanaa and several nearby settlements. This wave was followed by other Jews from central Yemen who continued to move into Ottoman Syrian provinces until 1914. The majority of these groups moved into Jerusalem and Jaffa. In 1884, some families settled into a new-built neighborhood called Yemenite Village Kfar Hashiloach (Hebrew: כפר השילוח) in the Jerusalem district of Silwan, and built the Old Yemenite Synagogue.

Before World War I, there was another wave that began in 1906 and continued until 1914. Hundreds of Yemenite Jews made their way to Ottoman Syria and chose to settle in the agricultural settlements. It was after these movements that the World Zionist Organization sent Shmuel Yavne'eli to Yemen to encourage Jews to emigrate to the Land of Israel. Yavne'eli reached Yemen at the beginning of 1911 and returned to Ottoman Syria in April 1912. Due to Yavne'eli's efforts, about 1,000 Jews left central and southern Yemen, with several hundred more arriving before 1914.

=== 1920 to 1940s ===
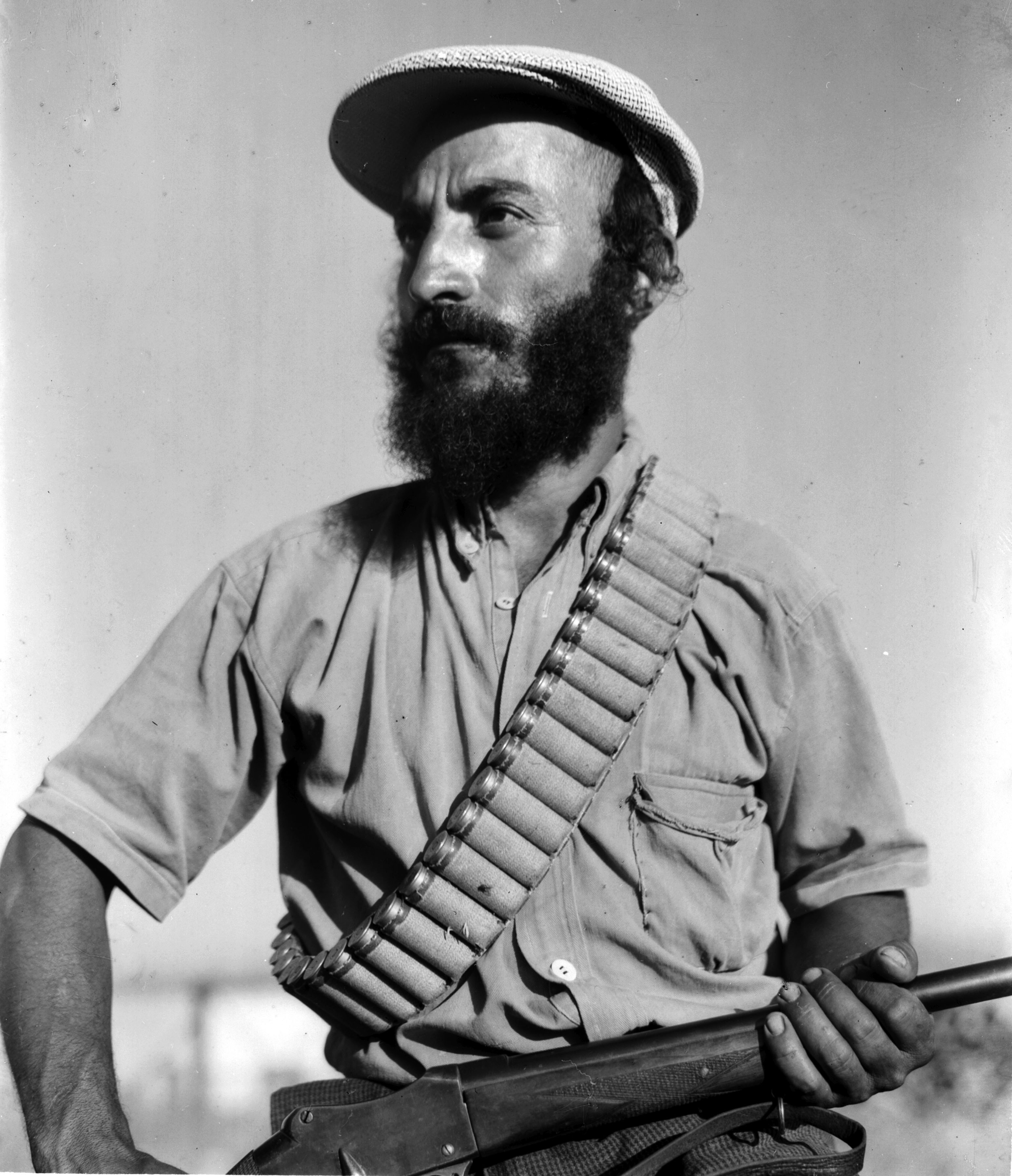
Yemenite Haganah member on guard duty at moshav Elyashiv, 1939

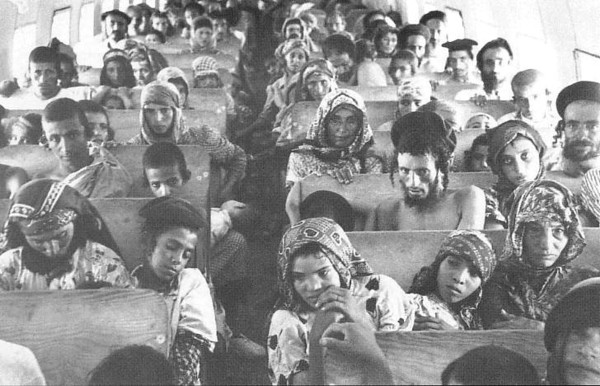
Yemenite Jews en route from Aden to Israel.

In 1922, the government of Yemen, under Yahya Muhammad Hamid ed-Din (Imam Yahya), re-introduced an ancient Islamic law entitled the "Orphans' Decree". The law dictated that, if Jewish boys or girls under the age of twelve were orphaned, they were to be forcibly converted to Islam, their connections to their families and communities were to be severed, and they had to be handed over to Muslim foster families. The rule was based on the law that the prophet Mohammed is "the father of the orphans", and on the fact that the Jews in Yemen were considered "under protection", and the ruler was obligated to care for them.

A prominent example is Abdul Rahman al-Iryani, the former president of the Yemen Arab Republic, who was alleged to be of Jewish descent by Dorit Mizrahi, a writer in the Israeli ultra-Orthodox weekly Mishpaha. She claimed to be his niece due to his being her mother's brother. According to her recollection of events, he was born Zekharia Hadad in 1910 to a Yemenite Jewish family in Ibb. He lost his parents in a major disease epidemic at the age of eight, and, together with his 5-year-old sister, he was forcibly converted to Islam, and they were put under the care of separate foster families. He was raised in the powerful al-Iryani family, and adopted an Islamic name. al-Iryani would later serve as minister of religious endowments under northern Yemen's first national government, and he became the only civilian to have led northern Yemen.

However, YemenOnline, an online newspaper, claimed to have conducted several interviews with several members of the al-Iryani family and residents of Iryan, and alleges that this claim of Jewish descent is merely a "fantasy" started in 1967 by Haolam Hazeh, an Israeli tabloid. It states that Zekharia Haddad is, in fact, Abdul Raheem al-Haddad, Al-Iryani's foster brother and bodyguard who died in 1980. Abdul Raheem is survived by tens of sons and grandsons.

=== 1947-1950 ===
In 1947, after the partition vote of the British Mandate of Palestine, Arab Muslim rioters, assisted by the local police force, engaged in a pogrom in Aden that killed 82 Jews and destroyed hundreds of Jewish homes. Aden's Jewish community was economically paralyzed, as most of the Jewish stores and businesses were destroyed. Early in 1948, the unfounded rumour of the ritual murder of two girls led to looting.

This increasingly perilous situation led to the emigration of virtually the entire Yemenite and Adenese Jewish communities. During this period, over 50,000 Jews emigrated to Israel. Operation Magic Carpet (Yemen) began in June 1949, and ended in September 1950. Part of the operation took place during the hostilities of the 1948 Arab-Israeli War (May 15, 1948 – March 10, 1949).

The operation was planned by the American Jewish Joint Distribution Committee. The plan was for the Jews from all over Yemen to make their way to the Aden area. Specifically, the Jews were to arrive in Hashed Camp and live there until they could be airlifted to Israel. Hashed was an old British military camp in the desert, about a mile away from the city of Sheikh Othman. The operation took longer than was originally planned. Over the course of the operation, hundreds of migrants died in Hashed Camp, as well as on the plane rides to Israel. By September 1950, almost 50,000 Jews had been successfully airlifted to the newly formed state of Israel.

According to an official statement by Alaska Airlines:

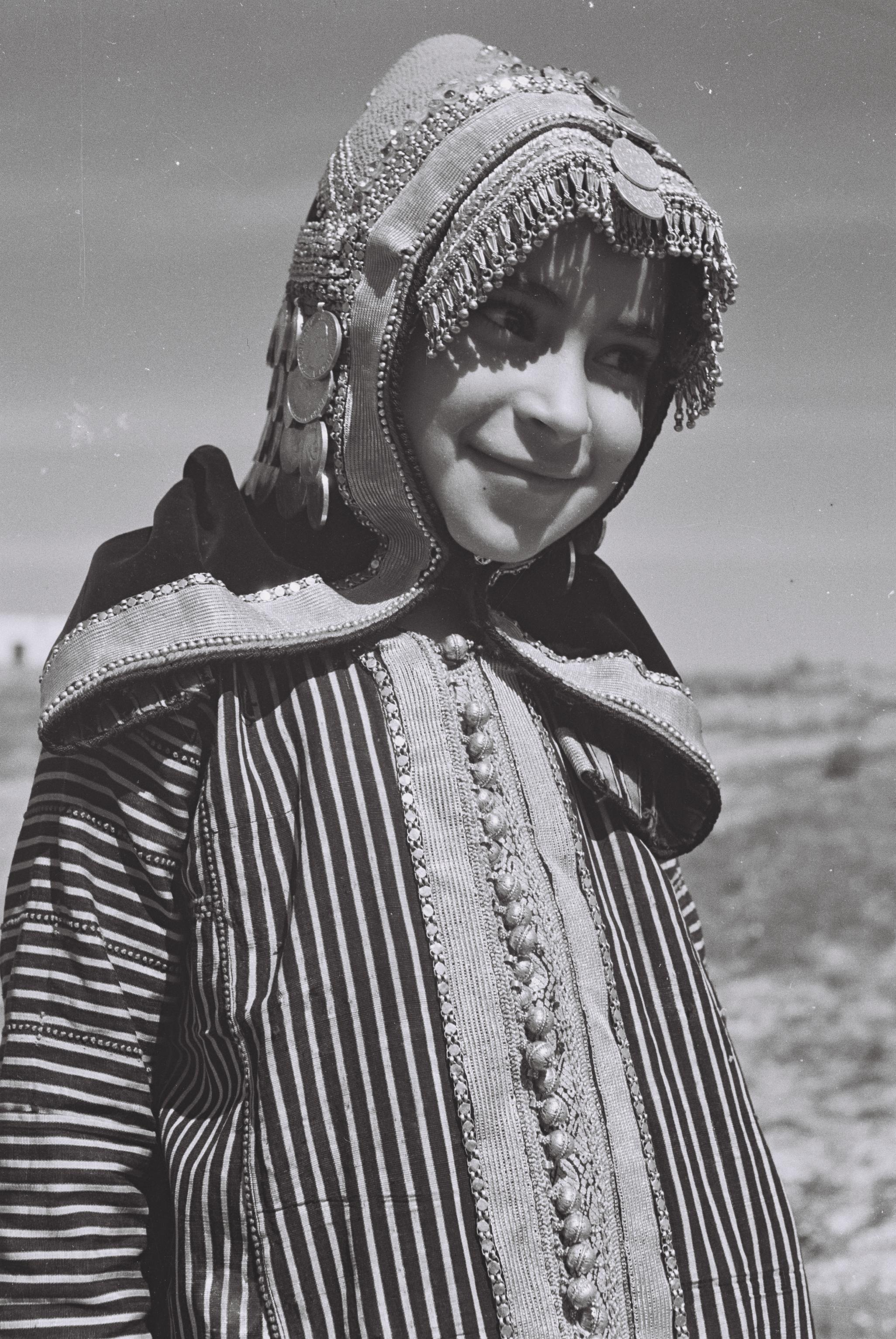
Yemenite girl wearing a gargush, 1947

When Alaska Airlines sent them on "Operation Magic Carpet" 50 years ago, Warren and Marian Metzger didn't realize that they were embarking on the adventure of a lifetime. Warren Metzger, a DC-4 captain, and Marian Metzger, a flight attendant, were part of what turned out to be one of the greatest feats in Alaska Airlines' 67-year history: airlifting thousands of Yemenite Jews to the newly created nation of Israel. The logistics of it all made the task daunting. Fuel was hard to come by. Flight and maintenance crews had to be positioned through the Middle East. And the desert sand wreaked havoc on engines.

It took a whole lot of resourcefulness throughout the better part of 1949 to do it. But in the end, despite being shot at and even bombed upon, the mission was accomplished – and without a single loss of life. "One of the things that really got to me was when we were unloading a plane at Tel Aviv", said Marian, who assisted Israeli nurses on a number of flights. "A little old lady came up to me and took the hem of my jacket and kissed it. She was giving me a blessing for getting them home. We were the wings of eagles."

For both Marian and Warren, the assignment came on the heels of flying the airline's other great adventure of the late 1940s: the Berlin Airlift. "I had no idea what I was getting into, absolutely none", remembered Warren, who retired in 1979 as Alaska's chief pilot and vice president of flight operations. "It was pretty much seat-of-the-pants flying in those days. Navigation was by dead reckoning and eyesight. Planes were getting shot at. The airport in Tel Aviv was getting bombed all the time. We had to put extra fuel tanks in the planes so we had the range to avoid landing in Arab territory."

Many Yemenite Jews became irreligious through the re-education program of the Jewish Agency.

=== Later emigration ===
A smaller, continuous migration was allowed to continue into 1962, when a civil war put an abrupt halt to any further Jewish exodus.

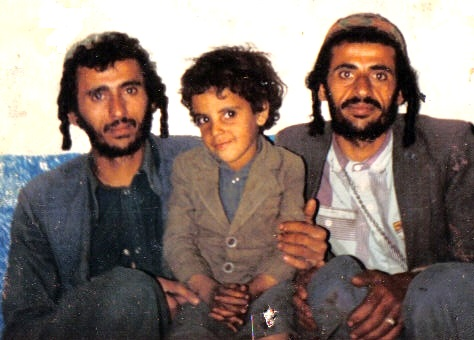
Jews of Amlah, Yemen (ca. 1990)

In August 1992, family units from Yemen began to arrive in Israel. The main bulk of new immigrants began to arrive in the summer of 1993, continuing throughout the autumn and Winter of that same year, and into 1994. Fewer arrivals arrived in 1995 and 1996. Some Jews had been brought to London, England, where they made their new place of residence.

In February 2009, 10 Yemeni Jews immigrated to Israel, and in July 2009, three families, or 16 people in total, followed suit.

In January 2013, it was reported that a group of 60 Yemenite Jews had immigrated to Israel in a secret operation, arriving in Israel via a flight from Qatar. This was reported to be part of a larger operation which was being carried out in order to bring the approximately 400 Jews left in Yemen to Israel in the coming months.

In March 2016, it was reported that the Jewish Agency brought 19 of the last remaining Yemenite Jews to Israel in a covert operation. 14 came from the town of Raydah, while one family of five hailed from the capital, Sanaa. The group from Raydah included the community's rabbi, who brought a Torah scroll believed to be between 500 and 600 years old.

In April 2014 it was reported that the remaining Jewish population in Yemen numbered 90.

On October 11, 2015, Likud MK Ayoob Kara stated that members of the Yemenite Jewish community had contacted him to say that the Houthi-led Yemen government had given them an ultimatum to convert or leave the country. A spokesman for the party of former President Ali Abdullah Saleh denied the reports as incorrect.

On March 21, 2016, a group of 19 Yemenite Jews were flown to Israel in a secret operation, leaving the population at about 50. In April 2016 the Houthis arrested three Yemenite Jews-including Rabbi Yousef. On June 7, 2016 Jews who had been arrested in Yemen after having helped smuggled out a Torah scroll were released.

In May 2017 the Yemeni-based charity Mona Relief (Yemen Organization for Humanitarian Relief and Development) gave aid to 86 members of the Jewish community in Sana'a. It was reported that in 2018 there were around 50 Jews remaining in Yemen.

In a July 2018 interview with a Yemenite rabbi, he claimed that they were definitely treated very well before the recent war in Yemen which has affected all communities in Yemen. He has also said that Yemenite Jews should have never traveled away from Yemen and that he believes thousands of Yemenite Jews will return to Yemen after the war ends.

In 2019, the Mona Relief website reported (February 25): "Mona Relief's team in the capital Sana'a delivered today monthly food aid packages to Jewish minority families in Yemen. Mona Relief has been delivering food aid baskets to Jewish community in the capital Sana'a since 2016. Our project today was funded by Mona Relief's online fundraising campaign in indiegog ..."

As of March 2020, the Jewish Cemetery in Aden was destroyed. On April 28, 2020, Yemenite Minister Moammer al-Iryani remarked the fate of the last 50 Jews in Yemen is unknown.

A 2020 World Population Review with a census of Jewish population by country has no listing of any Jews in Yemen.

On July 13, 2020, it was reported that the Houthi Militia were capturing the last Jews of Yemen of the Kharif District. In their last mention of the Jews in Yemen in July 2020 the Mona Relief reported on their Website that as of July 19, 2020, of the Jewish population in Yemen there were only a "handful" of Jews in Sana'a.

According to Yemeni publications published in July 2020, the last two Jewish families were waiting for deportation from the areas controlled by the Houthis, which would make Yemen, for the first time in its modern history, devoid of Jews, with the exception of the families of the brothers Suleiman Musa Salem and Sulaiman Yahya Habib in Sana’a and the family of Salem Musa Mara’bi who moved to the complex owned by the Ministry of Defense near the U.S. embassy in 2007 after the Houthis assaulted them and looted their homes. The publications said that a Jewish woman lives with her brother in the Rayda district and a man and his wife live in the Arhab district of the Sana’a governorate. A source said, “It is now clear that the Houthis want to deport the rest of the Jews, and prevent them from selling their properties at their real prices, and we are surprised that the international community and local and international human rights organizations have remained silent towards the process of forced deportation and forcing the Jews to leave their country and prevent them from disposing of their property.

In August 2020 of an estimated 100 or so remaining Yemen Jews, 42 have migrated to the United Arab Emirates (UAE) and the rest would also leave.

On November 10, 2020, the U.S. State Department called for the immediate and unconditional release of Levi Salem Musa Marhabi. A press statement said Marhabi has been wrongfully detained by the Houthi militia for four years, despite a court ordering his release in September 2019. On November 25, 2020, it is reported that a total of 38 Jews still remain in Yemen.

In December 2020 an Israeli rabbi visited the Yemenite Jews who escaped to the UAE. As of January 12, 2021, 7 Jews have left Yemen for UAE leaving 31 Jews in Yemen.

On 28 March 2021, 13 Jews were forced by the Houthis to leave Yemen, leaving the last four elderly Jews in Yemen. According to one report there are six Jews left in Yemen: one woman; her brother; 3 others, and Levi Salem Marahbi (who has been imprisoned for helping smuggle a Torah scroll out of Yemen).

In March 2022 the United Nations reported there was just one Jew in Yemen.

== Notable people ==
- Gil Hovav (born 1962), TV presenter, culinary journalist, restaurant critic, and author
- Achinoam Nini (born 1969), known professionally as Noa, singer-songwriter, percussionist, poet, composer, and human rights activist
- Gali Atari
- Shoshana Damari
- Ofra Haza (1957–2000), singer, songwriter, and actress
- Eyal Golan
- Dana International (born Sharon Cohen; 1969), professionally known as Dana International, pop singer who won the 1988 Eurovision Song Contest
- A-WA
- Zohar Argov
- Bracha Qafih
- Harel Skaat (born 1981), singer and songwriter, represented Israel in the 2010 Eurovision Song Contest
- Pe'er Tasi (born 1984), singer and songwriter
- Shahar Tzuberi (born 1986), Olympic bronze medalist windsurfer
- Yisrael Yeshayahu (1908–1979), politician, minister, and Speaker of the Knesset
- Amnon Yitzhak (born 1953), Haredi rabbi
- Shahar Hason (born 1976), comedian
- Boaz Mauda (born 1987), singer
- Ayelet Tsabari (born 1973), writer
- Yigal Amir (born 1970), political assassin

== See also ==
- Aliyah
- Arabic language in Israel
- History of the Jews in Yemen
- Israel–Yemen relations
- Austerity in Israel
- Ma'abarot
- Yemenite Children Affair
- Ringworm affair
