= Shvarts =

Shvarts is a surname, a variant of the surname Schwartz. Notable people with the surname include:

- Aliza Shvarts (born 1986), American artist and writer
- Elena Shvarts (1948–2010), Russian poet
- Shifra Shvarts (born 1949), Israeli medical researcher
