= Antifa (Israel) =

Anti-fascist movement in Israel

Antifa (Hebrew: אנטיפה or אנטיפא, also called: פעולה אנטי-פשיסטית; transl. Anti-fascist action) is a political movement composed of left-wing and far-left individuals and groups from Israel, who identify as anti-fascist.

The Antifa movement in Palestine began in the 1930s and remained active during that decade. Although the movement never gained widespread popularity in the country and was often viewed as radical by critics, it re-emerged in the 21st century. Today, its activities include the distribution of flyers, participation in demonstrations, and sometimes, physical violence.

Ultras Hapoel, a fan club of Hapoel Tel Aviv, see themselves as part of the movement.

== History ==
=== 1930s ===
In Palestine, anti-fascist groups emerged primarily from the Jewish left. One of the first and notable anti-fascist group, "Antifa" (אנטיפה) or "Anti-Fascist Action" (פעולה אנטי-פשיסטית), was established in Mandatory Palestine in 1934 to counter right-wing organizations within the Jewish community. In 1936, the group sought to raise awareness among the Jewish public about the Spanish Civil War. They organized crowdfunding and provided political support for the Republican factions. Several hundred left-wing anti-fascist activists, many of whom were members of the Communist Party of Palestine (PKP), joined the International Brigades to fight in Spain.

The movement's manifesto was written by left-wing activists in both Hebrew and Yiddish:

- Antifa is an organization open to all workers and citizens, regardless of political affiliation or party, that recognizes the need to fight against the scourge of fascism and antisemitic poison. It acknowledges the shared social and national interests of all laborers, regardless of nationality or religion.
- Antifa has no place for those who sow hatred against the Jewish worker, his growth, and his establishment in the country, nor for those who spread hatred against the Arab worker and his advancement.
- Antifa aims to empower the anti-fascist public in Israel to combat the dangers of fascism and chauvinism in both Jewish and Arab communities, while reaching out to those influenced by fascism and antisemitism.
- Antifa unites Palestine's working public in the global fight against fascism.

Local Antifa members were critical of Zionism and the Zionist movement's relationship with the United Kingdom, arguing that the United Kingdom allowed Jews to immigrate to Israel for its own colonialist interests.

=== 1940s ===
In 1943, towards the end of World War II, anti-fascist activists living in Palestine published a document titled "In the war against fascism and antisemitism – unite!".

Since the Israeli Declaration of Independence and the rise of Zionism and nationalism, local Antifa groups weakened significantly.

=== 1990s ===
In 1990, Antifa – An Israeli anti-fascist newspaper (אנטיפא – עיתון אנטיפשיסטי ישראלי antifa – iton antipshisti yisrali) was published. It was the first and only anti-fascist news source in Israel. Most of the articles on the newspaper covered the crimes of Nazi Germany and the Israeli occupation.

=== 2010s ===
In June 2014, in response to public outrage over the Gush Etzion kidnapping and murder and rising concerns about racism in Israeli society, the group 'Antifa 972' was founded. The number '972' refers to Israel's international dialing code. The group's mission is to document and take action against violence and hate crimes targeting Arabs, refugees, and left-wing activists.

=== 2020s ===
On February 4, 2021, Israeli hackers who sympathized with Antifa broke into the website of the Ku Klux Klan, a white supremacist organization in the United States, and replaced the homepage with a banner displaying an Antifa flag, accompanied by the text: "SHABBAT SHALOM GOODNIGHT WHITE PRIDE".

== Ideology ==
Antifa members in Israel address both global and local issues, with their primary focus on opposing the Israeli occupation and combating hate speech directed at minority groups. Additionally, the group shares testimonies from Palestinians living in the occupied territories. They also advocate for marginalized groups within the Israeli society, such as the ultra-Orthodox community, asylum seekers, and Mizrahi Jews. Some Antifa activists have taken part in protests opposing the eviction of residents from Givat Amal.

Antifa members in Israel strongly oppose the Israel Police and the Israel Defense Forces, claiming they serve the Zionist establishment's interests and maintain a monopoly on violence. Some members have shown support for refusniks as well.

== Groups ==
=== Ultras Hapoel ===
The fan club "Ultras Hapoel" was founded in 1999 and initially operated at Gate 7 of Bloomfield Stadium before relocating to Gate 5, where it remains active today. Although the club's ties to the working class have diminished over the years, the members of the club still identify as part of Antifa.

=== Antifa 972 ===
Antifa 972 is an anti-fascist group that has been operating in Israel since at least 2014.

Notable events involving Antifa 972 members include their participation in riots in Jerusalem, providing protection for left-wing demonstrations during the 2014 Gaza War, and preventing a Lehava march in Tel Aviv. Around the same time, two additional Antifa organizations were established in Israel.
