= Moshe Ya'ish al-Nahari =

Yemeni murder victim

Moshe Ya'ish al-Nahari (Hebrew: משה יעיש אל נהרי Arabic: موشيه يعيش النهاري born 1978 – 11 December 2008) was a Yemeni Jewish Hebrew teacher and kosher butcher in Raydah, Yemen, who was murdered by a Yemeni Muslim who accosted him near his home demanding that he convert to Islam. Al-Nahari's attacker subsequently boasted of the killing and the prosecution demanded the death penalty. The court ruled that the attacker was mentally unstable and ordered him to pay damages. In the subsequent appeals case, however, al-Abdi was sentenced to death. The murder of al-Nahari was the first of its kind in at least fifteen years.

== Life ==
Moshe Ya'ish al-Nahari, a 30-year-old father of nine, lived in the small Jewish community of Raydah, a market town in the Amran Governorate of northern Yemen. He worked as Hebrew teacher at the local Jewish school and as a butcher. He was married to Loza Solaiman. His brother is Rabbi Yahya Ya'ish, one of the leaders of Yemen's Jewish community. al-Nahari had visited Israel a few times, and at one point had lived for a time in the Oshiyot neighborhood of Rehovot, but later returned to Yemen. A few years before his death, he decided to make aliyah and had sold his house to fund the move. At the last moment his father convinced him to stay in Yemen. He had ties to the Satmar Hasidic movement in Yemen.

== Background ==
The Jewish community in Raydah numbered 266. They had complained about threats received from groups of Islamic extremists previously and they subsequently asked for the protection of the Yemeni government. However, security authorities in the past refused to recognize the claims of the Jewish minority, saying there was no evidence of threats against them.

== Attack ==
On 11 December 2008, Abdul Aziz Yahya Al-Abdi, a 39-year old former MiG-29 fighter pilot in the Yemeni Air Force, accosted al-Nahari in the market near his home demanding that he convert to Islam. He called out "Jew, accept the message of Islam." Al-Nahari asked to be left alone, but Abdi opened fire with a submachine gun until al-Nahari was riddled with bullets.

Nahari was buried in Yemen. His relatives and associates pressured the authorities to allow the body to be brought to Israel for burial, but approval was not granted.

== Court case ==
=== Defence ===
The suspect, Abdul Aziz Yahya Al-Abdi, claimed he was a representative of the Mujahideen in Yemen and the Horn of Africa. He initially refused his Yemeni lawyers who had volunteered to defend him and demanded an American lawyer chosen by the U.S. Embassy in Sanaa, claiming that while his Yemeni lawyers would be murdered for representing him, an American lawyer could be protected. Al-Abdi's trial, held in the criminal court of Amran Governorate, started on 22 December 2008. Al-Abdi admitted in court that he killed al-Nahari "to get closer to Allah" saying that he had warned the Jews months ago either convert to Islam or leave the country.

Attempting to avoid the death penalty, Khalid al-Shalali, one of Al-Abdi's lawyers, told the court that his client was mentally unfit and suffering from schizophrenia when the murder was committed. Al-Abdi's medical report was presented. The report, which recommended that he be committed to a mental hospital, noted that he had murdered his wife five years earlier, but had avoided prison by paying her family compensation. While his lawyer was reading the report, Al-Abdi said "executing me is better than putting me in a sanatorium, I'm very well." He then turned to the victim's father and widow saying "I killed him while I was very well, they deceive you." The lawyers also presented to the court a document signed by 40 men from the tribe of Al-Abdi witnessing that he was suffering psychotic problems.

=== Prosecution ===
The lawyer representing the al-Nahari family, Yahya Allaw, cast doubt on the report, saying it failed to state which doctors had issued the report, or their specialization. He added that the report failed to specify the exact physiological state of the suspect when he committed the crime. These claims were seconded by the National Organization for Defending Rights and Freedoms, who represented Al-Nahari in court pro bono. The court accepted the demands of the victim's lawyer, and decided to refer the medical report to a medical committee for clarification on the suspect's psychological state.

=== Verdict ===
The verdict was passed on 2 March 2009. The small courtroom was packed with several dozen other members of Abdi's Kharef tribe and the only Jewish people present were the victim's father and widow, also the only woman in the courtroom. As the court session got underway on Monday, the authorities sealed off the court building for fear of a violent backlash. Throughout the case, relatives of the deceased were verbally attacked and insulted by the defendant's tribe. Al-Abdi showed no remorse for his actions. The court ruled that Al-Abdi was legally insane, and ordered him committed to a psychiatric sanatorium. The court also ordered that a payment of 5.5 million YR ($27,500) in damages be made to Nahari's family. When the verdict was read out, the dozen people present inside the small courtroom expressed relief, except for the victim's relatives. Police hurried to empty the courtroom as soon as the trial was adjourned and prevented journalists from speaking to people present.

=== Appeal and death sentence ===
The family of the victim decided to appeal the verdict to demand that the death penalty be implemented against the convicted. The prosecuting lawyer, Khaled al-Ansi, said, ”The verdict is a big scandal” and “The trial was not fair, and was not secure, the Judge was afraid. The verdict will lead to the emigration of the remaining Jews from Yemen.” The rabbi of the Jewish community in Amran, Yahya Yaeish, said “The verdict will encourage more killings of Jews.”

On 21 June 2009, the appeals court sentenced Al-Abdi to death. His lawyers responded that they would take the case to the country's Supreme Court.

In April 2011, it was reported that Al-Abdi had escaped from prison with ten other inmates after bribing the guards. Several of the escaping inmates were later caught, but Al-Abdi remains at large.

== Reactions ==
In response to the court case, the Jewish community expressed their ordeal and how unsafe they felt after extremists had been sending them hate letters and threats by phone. The killing heightened the distress amongst the Jewish community in Raydah and their complaints eventually reached the President of the Republic. They demanded to be relocated to the capital Sanaa and to be compensated for their houses and property in Raydah. Their demands were met by President Saleh, who ordered properties to be provided for them in Sanaa.

In 2009, five of Nahari's children made aliyah. In 2012, his wife Lauza and four other children followed, having remained in Yemen so she could serve as a witness during the trial.

Amnesty International wrote to the Yemeni Government urging the country to protect its Jews. The human rights organization stated that it is "deeply concerned for the safety of members of the Jewish community in northwestern Yemen following the killing of one member of the community and anonymous serious threats to others to leave Yemen or face death."

== See also ==
- Yemenite Jews
