= Amidar (company) =

Israeli housing company

- Native name: עמידר
- Type: State-owned
- Industry: Public housing
- Founded: 1949
- Headquarters: Israel
- Area served: Israel
- Products: Public and subsidised housing
- Owners: Jewish Agency for Israel (50%); Jewish National Fund (20%); Government of Israel (20%)
- Website: www.amidar.co.il

Amidar (Hebrew: עמידר) is a state-owned housing company in Israel.

The company was founded in 1949. Its mission statement is "to be involved in construction projects, development, population and maintenance in Israel". It is a major provider of subsidized, and rent-controlled housing, primarily for the lower socio-economic sector of the population.

Its major stock holders are the Jewish Agency for Israel (50%), the Jewish National Fund (20%) and the Israeli government (20%).
