= Raydah =

Raydah رَيْدَة
- Location in Yemen
- Coordinates: 15°49′24″N 44°2′19″E
- Country: Yemen
- Governorate: 'Amran Governorate
- Control: Houthis
- Time zone: UTC+3 (Yemen Standard Time)

Raydah (Arabic: رَيْدَة; sometimes transliterated Raidah or al-Raidah) is a large market town located 49 kilometres (30 mi) north of Sana'a, and 11 miles (18 km) north of Amran, in northwestern Yemen.

== Jewish community ==
In previous years, before most Yemeni Jews emigrated, the Suq al-yahud or Jewish market was held here.

As of 2009, the Jewish community numbered 266 persons, and operated three synagogues and two schools. However, during the 2008-09 Gaza War, tensions with local Muslims increased and an Islamic extremist murdered a Jewish teacher and kosher butcher, Moshe Ya'ish al-Nahari, after demanding he convert to Islam. The last time an incident of this kind had occurred in Raydah was in 1986, when two Jews were killed. Following Nahari's murder, the Jewish community expressed how vulnerable they felt, and complained that they had been harassed and threatened by extremists. They requested assistance from the government. In June 2009, 16 Jewish families who resided in the town left for Israel. Nahari's wife and nine children also moved to Israel.

In 2016, amid the Yemeni civil war, the Israeli government launched a covert operation to airlift 19 Jews from Raydah to Israel, effectively marking the end of the town's Jewish community. Only one family elected to remain in Raydah.

== Hospital ==
Raydah is home to a small hospital, funded by Save the Children. However, funding cuts and the ongoing civil war have reduced the hospital's ability to treat patients.

== See also ==
- Moshe Ya'ish al-Nahari
