= Yehuda Cohen =

Israeli judge

- יהודה כהן

Justice of the Supreme Court of Israel
- In office 1982–1984

Personal details
- Born: 23 January 1914 Safed, Ottoman Empire
- Died: 8 August 2009 (aged 95)
- Resting place: Rishon LeZion, Israel
- Education: American University of Beirut

Military service
- Rank: Major
- Unit: Israel Defense Forces

Yehuda Cohen (Hebrew: יהודה כהן; 23 January 1914 – 8 August 2009) was an Israeli judge. He was appointed to the Israeli Supreme Court in 1982 until his retirement in 1984.

== Early life and education ==
Yehuda Cohen was born in Safed. He studied mathematics at the American University of Beirut and returned to Mandate Palestine to study law. Cohen enlisted in the British Army and continued to serve as a major in the Israel Defense Forces.

== Career ==
Cohen served in the Jerusalem District Court from 1954, and became its president in 1980. In 1982, he was appointed to the Israeli Supreme Court, where he served until retirement.

Cohen was also active in public life, as chairman of HaMutzar HaYerushalmi organization for promotion of arts (1964–1993), vice president of Israeli chapter of Bnei Brit (1968–1970) and chairman of the board of Ezrat Nashim (later Herzog) hospital (1968–1993). In 1995 he was selected to head a national inquiry commission on the disappearance of children of Yemenite origin during the 1950s.

Cohen died on 8 August 2009, aged 95. He was buried in Rishon LeZion.

== See also ==
- Israeli judicial system
