= Giv'at Amal Bet =

Coordinates: 32°5′36.14″N 34°47′51.85″E

Giv'at Amal Bet (Hebrew: גבעת עמל ב') is a residential neighborhood of Tel Aviv, Israel.

Givat Amal Bet is located in the close proximity to Bavli and Park Central neighborhoods of the city. During the 1947–1949 Palestine war, it was inhabited by Jewish refugees from Arab lands after the original residents of the Palestinian village of al-Jammasin al-Gharbi, which once stood there, fled to avoid the fighting.

Since 1954, when the Tel Aviv-Yafo municipality issued an eviction edict, its residency status has been under dispute. Land ownership exchanged hands over the years between various development companies and the residents. In 2014, 7 families left after reaching a settlement or by court order.
