= Orphans' Decree =

Former Yemen law forcing conversion of Jewish orphans to Islam

The Orphans' Decree was a law in the Kingdom of Yemen mandating the forced conversion of Jewish orphans to Islam promulgated by the Zaydi. According to one source, the decree has "no parallel in other countries".

This law, like all laws applying to dhimmi, was applied more or less ruthlessly depending upon the inclination local and royal officials. It was aggressively enforced at least some of the time and in some regions under Imam Yahya (1918–1948).

Although forced conversion is not widely recognized under Islamic laws, historian and Arabist Shelomo Dov Goitein believes that a forced conversion of orphans could have been justified by the revelation attributed to Muhammad that states: "Every person is born to the natural religion [Islam], and only his parents make a Jew or a Christian out of him."

== Before Ottoman rule ==
There are only some fragmentary and isolated accounts about the enforcing of the decree before Ottoman rule. It was not enforced equally in every part of Yemen. There were places where Jews were able to hide orphaned children and protect them from being forcibly converted to Islam. Still there are several accounts about the enforcement of the decree.

Shalom Shabazi, a Jewish poet who lived in 17th century Yemen, wrote in one of his poems about "stealing orphans". A translation of the poem runs thus: "Thousands of orphaned souls, both boys and girls, were wrested from the arms of their parents, grandfather and grandmother, by force by the nations all the days of the many kings of Yemen."

Rabbi Hayyim Habshush writes that by the end of Al-Mansur Ali I's rule in 1809 the Imam built palaces for his sons "and when he settled his sons in those palaces he ordered that the orphaned Jewish children be seized and converted and made servants and scribes in the palaces." In the same account Habshush testifies that there were some "who concealed the children in their homes until they were fully grown."

One more account is dated to 1850. Jewish scholar Amram Qorah recalls a story about his orphaned father, who was hidden by a Jewish family in their home and thereby escaped a forced conversion.

== After the end of Ottoman rule ==
British historian Tudor Parfitt compares the Orphans' Decree to "draconian measures introducing the forced conscription of Jewish children into the Czarist's army" in Russia. Concerning the reintroduction of the Orphans' Decree in Yemen in 1921, after the end of Ottoman rule, Parfitt says that "in the first ten years" it "was implemented with great rigour."

Once again the decree was not implemented equally in every part of Yemen. In some places the authorities turned "a blind eye" to escaped and hidden children, but, in the places the Decree was implemented, troops were sent to search for escaped children, and the leaders of Jewish communities that were suspected of hiding the children were "imprisoned and tortured".

In 1923 the Jewish community of Al Hudaydah suffered the abduction of 42 orphaned children, some of whom managed to escape.

A witness account from Sanaa recalls an abduction of two fatherless siblings, a brother and a sister. The children were forcibly taken from their mother's arms and beaten to make them convert to Islam. The Jewish community offered to pay for the children's release to their family, but Islamic law prohibits accepting money to avert such a conversion. The witness compares the ceremony of the conversion of the siblings to a "funeral procession".

After getting out of the orphanage, converted Jewish boys were often enlisted as soldiers. The girls made a valuable asset as brides because there were no relatives who needed to be paid a bride price in order to marry them.

Jewish communities responded by acting quickly when children were orphaned, sometimes taking children and placing them with Jewish families living in dense Jewish settlements, especially Sanaa, large enough that a Jewish family might lack Muslim neighbors who would notice the addition of a child to a family. However, because "hidden" children might be discovered and forcibly converted, relatives or the Jewish community sometimes arranged to take them out of the Yemen; cases are recorded of Jews making the arduous journey to settle in the Land of Israel with orphaned relatives or unrelated children they had adopted in order to escape the threat that the children might be taken for conversion. In the first half of the twentieth-century, the Chief Rabbi of Yemen, Yihya Yitzhak Halevi, worked tirelessly to save Jewish orphans from falling into the hands of Muslims. From about 1920, British imperial control of Aden provided a safe haven to which orphaned children could be taken; clandestine caravans carrying orphans and traveling by night are known to have gone from various parts of Yemen to take orphaned children to the sanctuary of the British Empire.

An orphaned boy or boy or girl could also be very quickly married, since married people had the legal status of adults and could not be taken for forcible conversion.

== Modern day expression ==
The Orphans' Decree has left its imprint in Modern Israel, where playwright, Shlomo Dori, in his play A New Life (1927), raises the concern of being imprisoned for hiding two Jewish orphans, and where actor and composer, Sa'adia Dhamari, in the musical The Bearer [of Good Tidings] (1957), makes his chief protagonists Jewish orphans who had converted to Islam.

== See also ==
- Yemenite Children Affair
- Mawza Exile
