= Yemenite Children Affair =

Disappearance of thousands of children in 1950s Israel

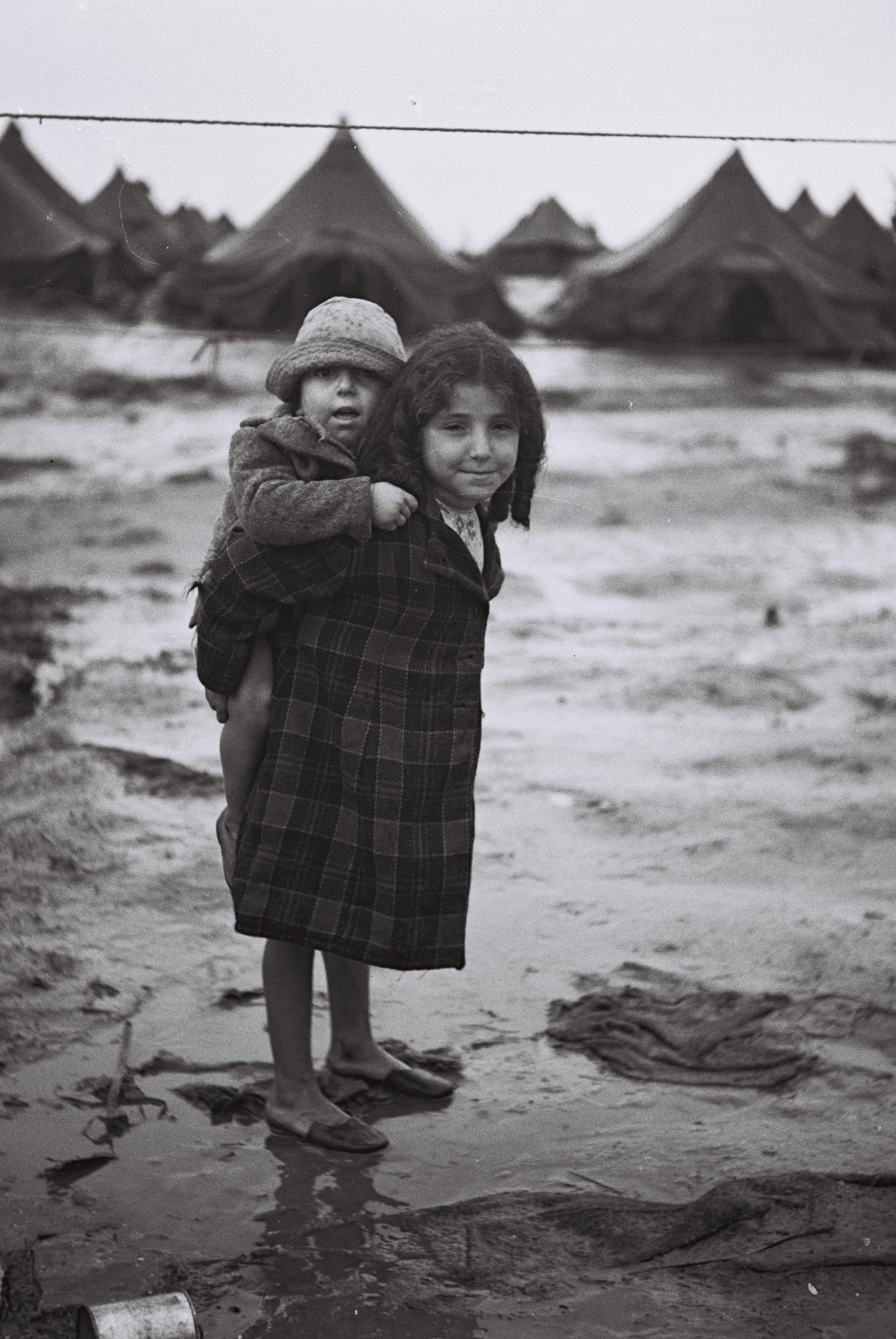
A young Yemenite girl carrying her brother in the Beit Lid camp in 1950

The Yemenite Children Affair (Hebrew: פרשת ילדי תימן, romanized: Parshat Yaldei Teiman) refers to the disappearance of mainly Yemenite Jewish babies and toddlers of immigrants in the newly founded state of Israel from 1948 to 1954. Claims of the number of children affected range from 1,000 to 5,000.

The majority of immigrants arriving in Israel during this period were from Yemen, with considerable numbers coming from Iraq, Morocco, Tunisia, Egypt, Libya and the Balkans. According to low estimates, one in eight children of Yemenite families disappeared. Hundreds of documented statements made over the years by the parents of these infants allege that their children were removed from them.

There have been allegations that no death certificates were issued, and that parents did not receive any information from Israeli and Jewish organizations as to what had happened to their infants. However, Yaacov Lozowick, Chief Archivist at the Israel State Archives, has documented records showing that while the fate of a small fraction of the "missing" children cannot be traced, in the overwhelming majority of cases the children died in hospital, were buried, and the families notified, although these illnesses, deaths, and family notifications were handled with enormous insensitivity. In Lozowick's opinion, "There was no crime, but there was a sin."

Widespread speculation persists that the infants were given or sold to childless Holocaust survivors in a covert systematic operation. Conclusions reached by three separate official commissions set up to investigate the issue unanimously found that the majority of the children were buried, having died from diseases.

Israeli Prime Minister Benjamin Netanyahu described the issue as "an open wound that continues to bleed" for the many families not knowing what happened to the children who disappeared.

== Context ==
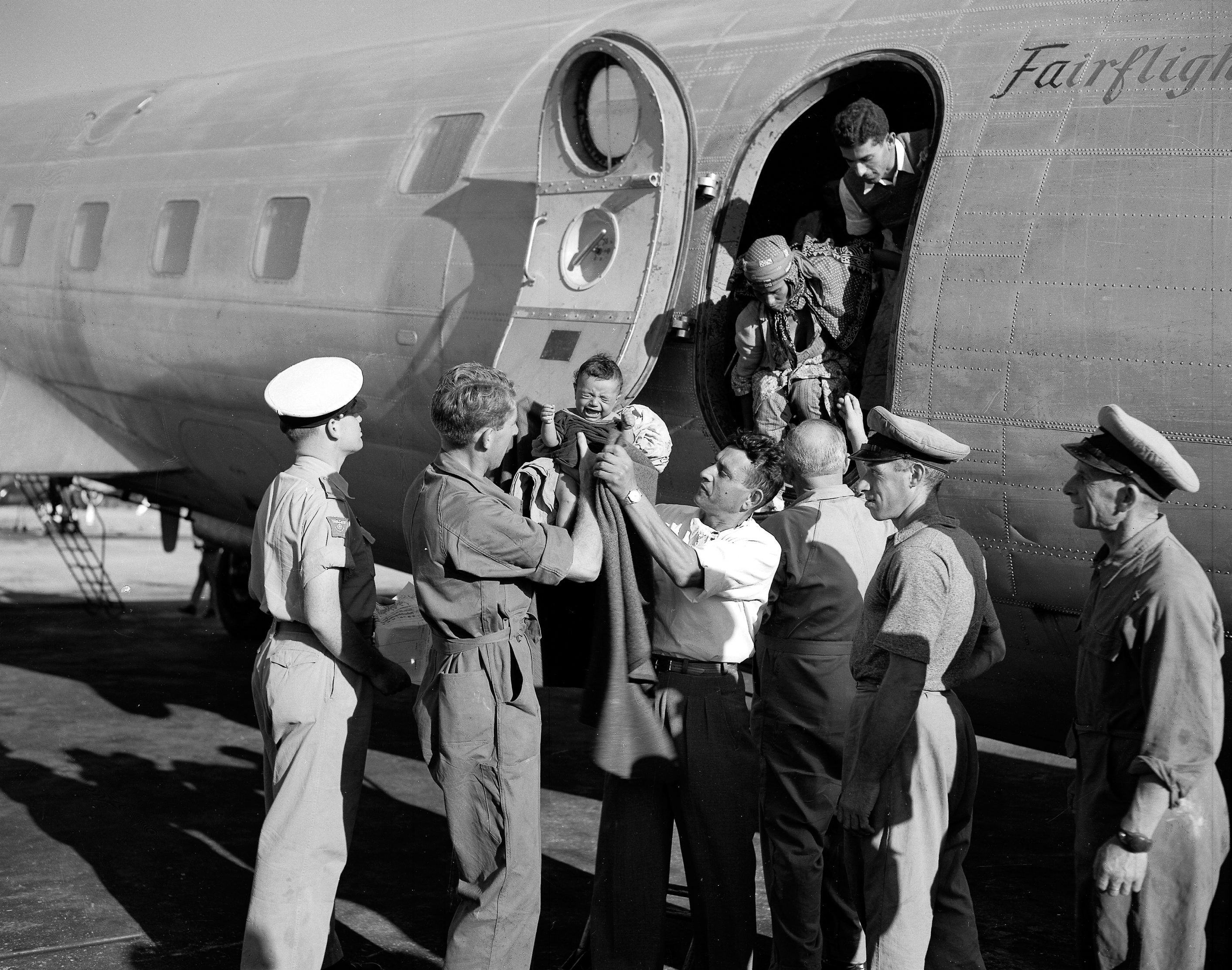
Jewish Agency representatives meeting Yemenite immigrants, upon arrival at Lod airport in 1949

The Yemenite community was well established in Ottoman and then British Mandate Palestine by the turn of the century. The State of Israel was created in 1948 and almost immediately began to receive refugees who included both several hundred thousand Holocaust survivors and Jews who had become refugees as a result of the Jewish exodus from Arab and Muslim countries, which resulted in about 700,000 new immigrants from the Muslim world.

Consequently, the population of Israel rose from 800,000 to two million between 1948 and 1958. During this period, food, clothes, and furniture had to be rationed in what became known as the Austerity Period. Between 1948 and 1970, approximately 1,151,029 Jewish refugees relocated to Israel. Many arrived as penniless refugees and were housed in temporary camps known as ma'abarot; by 1952, over 200,000 immigrants were living in these tent cities.

Roughly 50,000 Yemenite Jews were brought to Israel in Operation On Wings of Eagles through a temporary camp in Aden.

=== Hashid Camp ===
In 1943, the immigration of Jews from Yemen to Palestine increased. Only several hundred had immigrated in the years before, but over 4,000 immigrated in 1943–1944. They were only allowed to leave Yemen through the British colony of Aden. In May 1945 the British banned further such immigration and 7,000 Yemenites remained in a camp near Aden called Camp Hashid. From December 1948 to March 1949 they were flown to Israel and at that point the camp was dismantled.

In May 1949, Ahmad bin Yahya, the King and Imam of Yemen, announced that Jews were permitted to leave the country. The Jewish Agency reached an agreement with the British that it would establish a camp near Aden as a temporary location for those Jews. The British estimated that there were 20,000 Jews in Yemen and that 1,000 would come each month. A new camp was built near the old Hashid camp. But it turns out that there were some 50,000 Jews in Yemen and soon enough the camp had 13,000 residents. They had traveled a dangerous journey by foot and many were in poor health. The poor infrastructure at the camp only made things worse.

=== Coming to Israel ===
The immigrants from Yemen were initially housed in three former British military camps: Rosh HaAyin, Beit Lid (Pardesiya) and Ein Shemer. Some also briefly stayed at a camp in Atlit. Those camps were closed after a year and a half at the end of 1950 and their residents were moved to existing ma'abarot.

== Disappearances ==
Conditions in the ma'abarot (tent cities) were harsh. There was poor hygiene and widespread disease. The authorities decided it would be best to move the babies to separate (concrete-built) houses. Older children were often taken to the temporary care of foster families. Furthermore, children who caught an infectious disease had to be quarantined: moved to special wards in other hospitals. Hospital staff would often discourage contact between parents and children in fear of further spread of disease. Many babies did eventually die. And in those cases they were often buried in haste without waiting for the parents; due to poor communication it would often take days or more for the parents to be notified and come, and the hospitals did not have the resources to keep the bodies for that long.

This resulted in many cases where information about children was lost.

Many of the complaints have common characteristics:

- Almost all the missing children were under the age of three, they were the children of new immigrants who were less than a year in Israel and who arrived at the newly founded country in the immigration waves of those years (see also Operation Magic Carpet), and almost all were descendants of Mizrahi Jews—especially descendants of immigrants from Yemen.
- Almost all disappeared while in hospitals or when they were allegedly taken to hospitals.
- Almost all the parents received only a spoken explanation that their children had died. The spoken message was only given to the parents when they inquired about the cause of their children's disappearance and in most instances they were told of their child's sudden death only after the funeral (or the alleged funeral) was held in their absence. In addition, the death records were incomplete.
- Some of the parents of the children who disappeared received a recruitment order from the Israel Defense Forces at a time when their children were supposed to approach the age of recruitment.

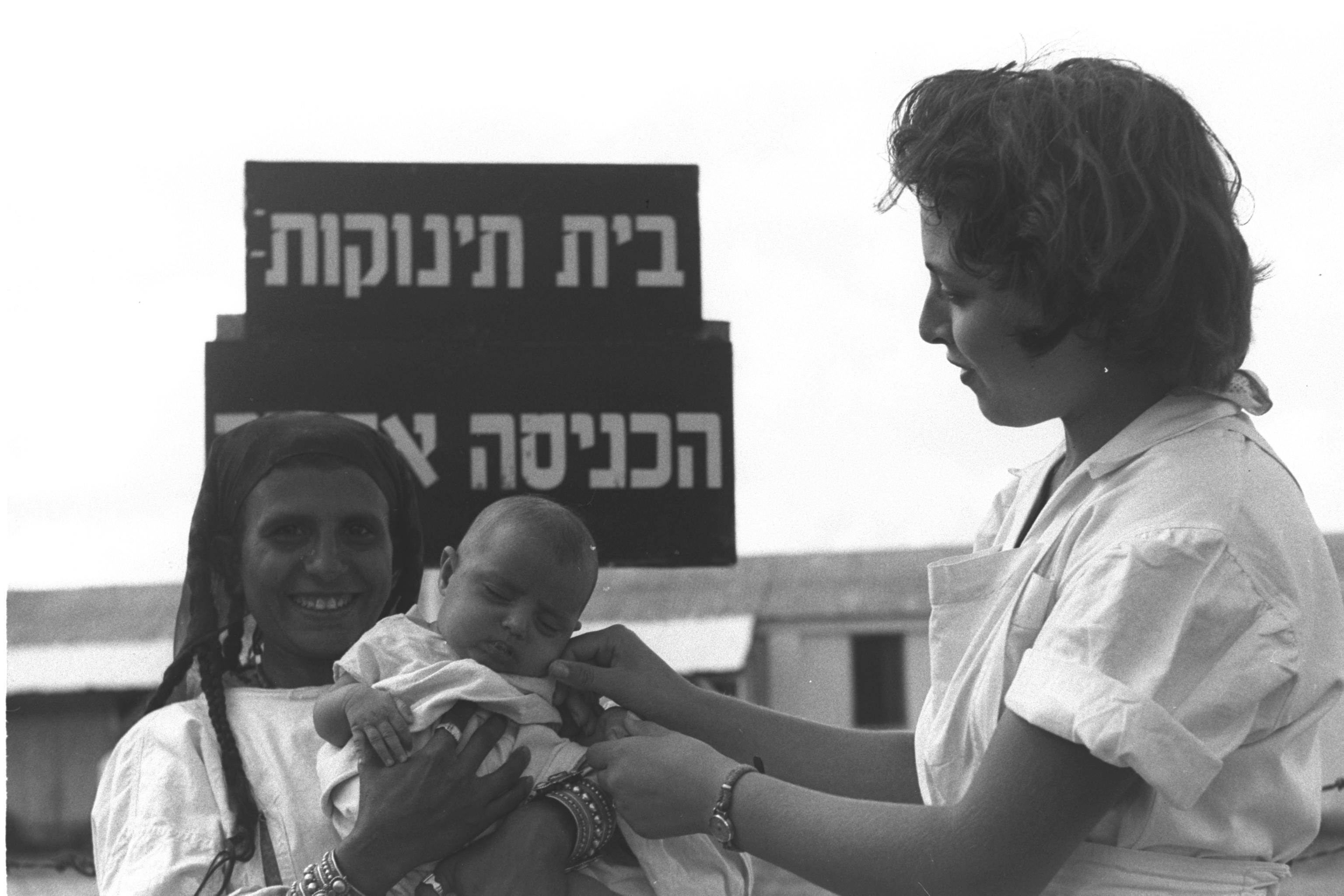
Nurse with Yemenite mother and child at Ein Shemer kibbutz in 1950

The mystery surrounding the disappearance of these children has led to the claim that while many children were recorded as having died, in fact they were either kidnapped or adopted by rich Ashkenazi Jews in Israel or abroad. The affair has been widely covered in the Israeli media through the decades, and so far four official investigating committees have been established to investigate the claims. The committees investigated many hundreds of cases, and determined that the vast majority of children died and only in a minority of cases they did not find enough evidence to determine what happened.

The peak of the public outcry on the matter occurred in 1994 when Yemenite Rabbi Uzi Meshulam established an "armed sect" of radical Yemenite Jews in his garden, who barricaded themselves in his home and violently resisted Israeli law enforcement while demanding that the Israeli government establish a State Commission of Inquiry to examine the matter. Meshulam's efforts led to the creation of the Kedmi Commission the following year. The third commission of its kind, it set out to reinvestigate the disappearances.

== Inquiry committees ==
Since the 1960s, the Yemenite children affair has repeatedly been the subject of public debate every few years. As a result, through the years three formal inquiry committees and one public inquiry committee were established to investigate the matter and to expose the truth on this issue.

=== The Bahlul-Minkowski Committee ===
In 1967, the Bahlul-Minkowski Committee was established. After examining 342 cases of disappearances, the committee determined that in 316 of these cases it was confirmed that the children had died, and that in two instances the children were adopted; the other 24 cases were inconclusive.

=== Shalgi committee ===
The Israeli government led by Yitzhak Shamir established a commission headed by Justice Moshe Shalgi which lasted four years. This committee received new evidence on 301 children, and determined that in 65 of these cases their fate was unknown. It determined that in all the other cases the children did die. The report was met with dissatisfaction by some Knesset members with David Mena saying, "The report doesn't reflect the real picture of the Yemenite children's disappearance." Knesset member and chair of the interior committee, Dov Shilansky, who had overseen testimony given said, "I personally believe, in contradiction to the Shalgi report, that there were more than a few cases of kidnapping of Yemenite babies."

=== Kedmi Commission ===
In 1995, immediately after the publication of the Shalgi Committee's conclusions, and following a public uproar, the Kedmi Commission was established. Also known as the Cohen-Kedmi Commission, it was created to examine more than 1,000 cases of missing children.

In 2001, the commission published its conclusions. It found that in the state's first six years, although as many as 1,000 children may have disappeared, there was no basis to the claim that the establishment abducted babies. Hundreds of thousands of documents relevant to testimonies and evidence were classified for 70 years and will not be available to the public until 2071. The committee examined more than 800 cases, and did not manage to reach absolute conclusions in 56 of these cases. The committee determined that in 750 cases the children died. The commission said that 42 children were unaccounted for. In 2001 a seven-year public inquiry commission concluded that the accusations that Yemenite children were kidnapped by the government were not true. The commission unequivocally rejected claims of a plot to take children away from Yemenite immigrants. The report determined that documentation existed showing that 972 of the 1,033 missing children were deceased. Five additional missing babies were found to be alive. The commission was unable to discover what happened in another 56 cases. Concerning these unresolved 56 cases, the commission deemed it "possible" that the children were handed over for adoption following decisions made by individual local social workers, but not as part of an official policy.

=== Re-examination ===
In June 2016, Prime Minister Benjamin Netanyahu appointed Tzachi Hanegbi, a government minister, to re-examine the evidence in the three previous inquiries. Netanyahu said it would "right an historic wrong" and marked a new era of transparency. The government also opened up nearly all of the archives of the inquiries putting them online. Hanegbi subsequently gave an interview on Israeli TV in which he stated: "They took the children and gave them away. I don't know where." Hanegbi claimed that at least "hundreds" of children were taken without their parent's consent, marking the first time a public official had made such a claim.

Disturbing revelations also followed in a special Knesset committee about medical experiments that had been conducted on the Yemenite children. Prior testimony given under oath during the previous inquiries revealed that many children had died as a consequence of medical negligence. Further testimony revealed that four undernourished babies died after being administered an experimental protein injection. Violating Jewish tradition, post-mortem examinations were carried out on children who were then buried in mass graves. Children's hearts were removed in some cases and given to US doctors researching the near absence of heart disease found in Yemen.

== Events since ==
After the issue resurfaced, a Haaretz investigation found that dozens of Ashkenazi children vanished in a manner similar to the way the Yemenite children did.

On 28 December 2016, 400,000 documents were released regarding the Yemenite Jewish Children affair.

On 23 January 2018, after staging a mass demonstration in Petach-Tikvah, Yemenite families of children believed to have been abducted were given permission by the State Attorney's Office to exhume 18 graves said to be those of their missing loved ones. Their hope was that, by exhuming their bodies for DNA testing, if the graves should prove to be empty or that the genetic findings do not match those of their siblings, it would give undisputed evidence of a cover-up in the disappearance of these children.

On 24 September 2022, the Health Ministry and the National Institute of Forensic Medicine announced that a "full match" was established between the DNA extracted from the remains of a child, Yosef Melamed, and the genetic profile of his family members. Before the revelation, Melamed's family suspected that he was kidnapped and another child was buried in his place. This was the first and so far the only case in which the Israeli authorities were able to produce a genetic profile from the remains in one of the opened graves.

== Official recognition of family suffering and compensation ==
Against the background of a lawsuit by the families of Yemeni immigrants, in February 2021 the government approved a decision to "express sorrow" over the Jewish Yemeni children affair and the compensation of the families, and that the state "recognizes the suffering of the families". Families whose child's fate is unknown to them will receive up to NIS 200,000. Families who have not received real-time information about the death of their children - including the death itself, its circumstances or the place of burial - will receive NIS 150,000 each. Only families whose case has been tried in the committees of inquiry are entitled to compensation.

In December 2021, Haaretz exposed a draft report on the affair whose publication was being suppressed by the Ministry of Health. Written by the outgoing deputy director general and two others, it

"reveals the involvement of doctors, nurses and caregivers in taking the children and acting as middlemen in their adoptions, sometimes in exchange for money. The report chronicles racist perceptions at the time of 'backward immigrants' from Middle Eastern and North African countries, using the pretext of it being in the 'best interests of the children' to justify their being taken away from their biological parents."

This was thought to be the first official reference to the involvement of a ministry in the affair.

== See also ==
- Ringworm affair
- Orphans' Decree
- List of Israelite civil conflicts
