= Ringworm affair =

Medical incident in Israel, 1948–1960

The ringworm affair refers to circumstances involving an alleged number of 20,000 to 200,000 Jews who were treated between 1948 and 1960 for tinea capitis (ringworm) with ionizing radiation to the head and neck area within Israel. The population suffering from the disease in Israel at the time was composed primarily of newly arrived immigrants and populations who were expected to emigrate, mostly from North Africa, as well as some from Middle East and elsewhere, but many Jewish children were irradiated in their home countries regardless of their intent to emigrate.

The irradiation of Mizrahi children is viewed by activists in Israel as the most salient example of injustices encountered in the 1950s as a result of shortcomings or irresponsibility on the part of authorities in the absorption in Israeli society of new immigrants.

A documentary about the affair, titled The Ringworm Children (Hebrew: ילדי הגזזת, romanized: Yeladei Hagazezet), was released in 2003. The film, which claims that 100,000 children received radiations doses thousands of times beyond what is safe, was lauded at film festivals. However, in 2018, the film's creator distanced himself from it, claiming that it "doesn't meet the scientific criteria." The exact number of Mizrahim who suffered health complications as a result of the treatment is unclear. A study by the Israeli Ministry of Health in coordination with UNICEF, who assisted in the purchase of x-rays for the project, estimated that 15,000 children were irradiated during this period. One nonprofit established to represent patients asserts that the number is as high as 200,000.

== Ringworm in Israel and Jewish communities ==
The scalp ringworm, also known as tinea capitis, mycosis, thrichophytia, and favus, was one of the most common fungal diseases in children in the Jewish communities in Israel and abroad since the 19th century. An X-ray treatment for ringworm has been used around the world as early as 1897. An estimated 200,000 children worldwide received X-ray treatment for tinea capitis in accordance with the standard Adamson-Kienbock procedure between 1910 and 1959, until griseofulvin, the first effective anti-fungal agent for ringworm, was introduced.

At the beginning of the 20th century, Hadassah Medical Center in Jerusalem treated ringworm disease among the religious Jewish community in Jerusalem using irradiation and the disease almost disappeared.

With mass immigration from Arab and Muslim countries in the 1940s and 1950s, many new cases of ringworm surfaced, primarily among immigrant children from Asia and North Africa, due to crowded living conditions with deficient hygiene facilities. At this time, ringworm was still treated with irradiation, under the supervision of Hadassah Medical Center (Prof. Dostrovsky and Prof. Drukman).

The treatment regime increased the risk of cancerous and non-cancerous growths of the head and neck area years later among a portion of the patients. A number of research groups in Israel and the world have followed patients who were irradiated as children, in order to examine this group's susceptibility to cancerous growths. In Israel, this study was led by Professor Baruch Modan, who published an article in the medical journal The Lancet in 1974, in which Modan determined a strong causal linkage between irradiation of ringworm patients and the appearance of growths on the head and neck.

In light of Modan's findings, in 1994 the Knesset passed a law requiring the Israeli government to provide compensation for damage to health resulting from exposure to such ringworm treatment. Compensation was available to patients (or their next of kin) treated with irradiation for ringworm between January 1, 1946, and December 31, 1960, and diagnosed with certain diseases as stipulated in the legislation. The law, however, placed the burden of proof on the claimant to submit factual evidence substantiating that they had received treatment – a proviso that generated public criticism.

== The Ringworm Children ==
A documentary film in Hebrew entitled The Ringworm Children (Hebrew: ילדי הגזזת, romanized: Yeladei Hagazezet), produced by the Dimona Communications Center and directed by Asher Nachmias and David Balchasan, was released in 2003. In 2007, the film received the Best Documentary Film Award at the Haifa International Film Festival and was featured as a documentary at the Israel Film Festival in Los Angeles. The documentary harshly attacked Israel's medical establishment in the 1950s, branding the episode "the ringworm children's holocaust" (shoat yeladei hagazezet). It also harshly criticized the compensation law and the politicians involved in its passage.

Treatment of ringworm patients is viewed by Mizrahi activists in Israel as the most salient example of injustices immigrants encountered in the 1950s as a result of shortcomings, negligence, paternalism, or irresponsibility on the part of Israeli authorities in the reception and absorption in Israeli society of new immigrants.

It is stated in the documentary that the X-ray radiation used on the children was thousands of times beyond the maximum recommended dose and it is suggested that the program was funded by the United States in order to test the effects of large radiation doses on humans.

The documentary states that 100,000 children were irradiated, and that 6,000 of them died shortly after receiving treatment. Therefore, the documentary alleged, the campaign against North African immigrants to Israel – prior to or following their arrival – was only part of an international phenomenon whose scope is still being uncovered.

In November 2018, the creator of the film, David Balchasan, stated in a television interview that the film was the result of "work that doesn't meet the scientific criteria", and that he "cannot stand behind it", as he considers himself an "honest man".

== Scientific findings ==
Research was conducted by medical historian Professor Shifra Shvarts, in the first decade of the 21st century, Shvarts followed a handful of parenthetical references to international organizations in Israeli primary documents, uncovering a wealth of archival material in Hadassah and United Nations archives and subsequently in the archives of a growing list of countries.

During the years 1921–1938, there was a campaign among Jews in Eastern Europe (that is, among Ashkenazi Jews) in the course of which some 27,000 East European children were irradiated – in part to allow their families to emigrate, since ringworm was grounds for exclusion of immigrants to the United States and elsewhere.

A key figure in formulation and organization of the ringworm campaign among the Jewish community in North Africa was Professor Moshe Prywes, who would later become president of Ben-Gurion University and the founding dean of BGU's Medical School. Prywes traveled to North Africa in 1947; following his findings there, he formulated a comprehensive program for eradicating contagious diseases among those planning to immigrate to Israel. The program was called T.T.T., for the three leading diseases the program would address: Tinea (Ringworm), Trachoma, and Tuberculosis.

Parallel to irradiation for ringworm carried out during the 1950s in the State of Israel, irradiation for ringworm was also carried out among children in Yugoslavia (94,000), in Portugal (30,000), and in Syria (7,000). About 4,600 children were irradiated for the disease between the years 1922–1958 in just one hospital in London.

The primary agent behind these ringworm eradication operations was UNICEF, which even assisted in the purchase of X-ray machines for this purpose. It supplied the two X-ray machines that operated in the immigrant intake and processing facility for immigrants in Israel, Sha'ar Ha'aliyah, nowadays part of Haifa. With the development of the drug griseofulvin for treating ringworm, UNICEF, as part of its policy devoted to eradicating contagious diseases among mothers and children, began funding the supply of the drug to all countries with a high incidence of ringworm.

There is a question of how many children of Moroccan origin actually suffered health issues as a result of X-ray ringworm treatment in childhood. Estimates in the aforementioned documentary film claim there were a hundred thousand persons or more. Others go even farther: a non-profit organization, established in 1999 to organize former patients and to ensure their compensation, put the number of Mizrahi children irradiated at 200,000.

Reports submitted to UNICEF by the Israeli Ministry of Health, published in the medical news, state that the number of children treated with irradiation in Israel between 1948 and 1959 was approximately 15,000. Testimony exists that shows that children of Eastern European origin who were suspected of having ringworm were also irradiated. It is hard to know their numbers but they most likely numbered a few thousand. According to Giora Leshem, who was Professor Modan's statistical partner in his 1974 study (based on the Cancer Registry), it seems that the number of Moroccans who were irradiated was in the vicinity of 15,000 children.

== See also ==
- First government of Israel
- Austerity in Israel
- Ma'abarot
- Yemenite Children Affair
- Chaim Sheba
