= Shifra Shvarts =

Israeli professor

- שפרה שוורץ
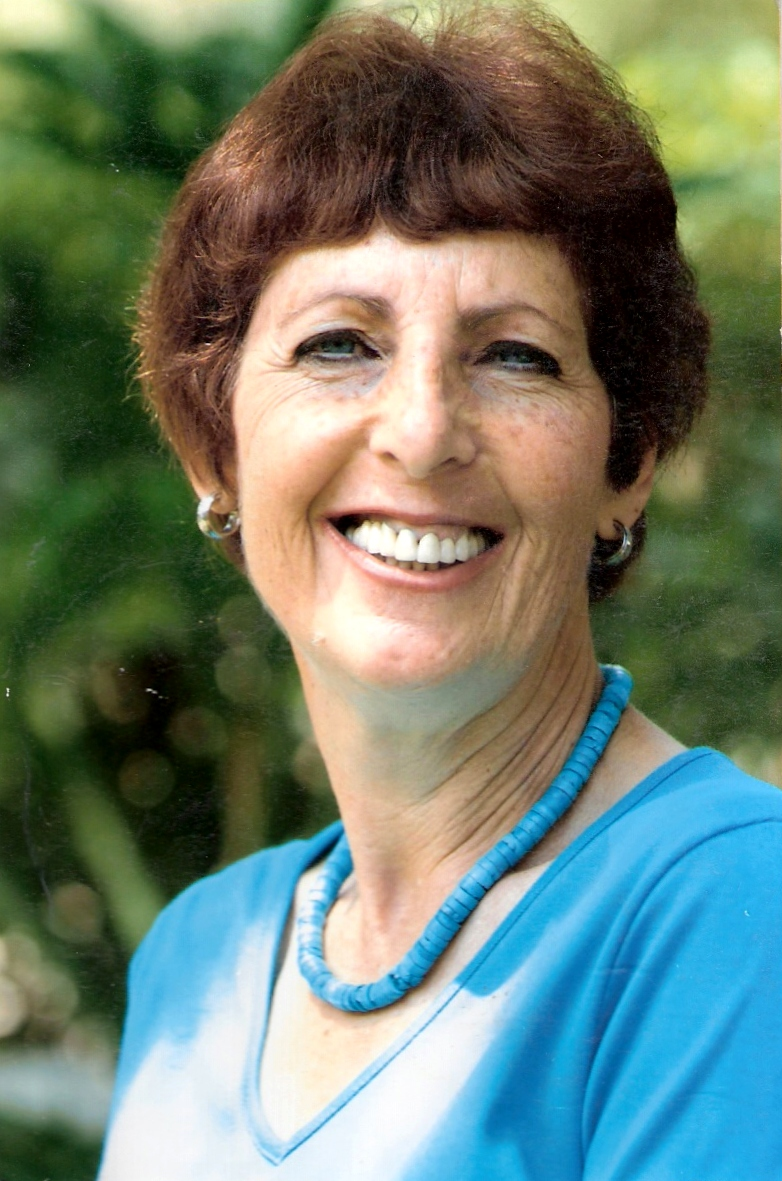
- Shvarts in 2008

Shifra Shvarts (Hebrew: שפרה שוורץ; born in June 1949), formerly Shifra Leider-Shvarts, holds the position of Professor Emeritus at the Center for Medical Education within the Faculty of Health Sciences at Ben-Gurion University. In addition to her academic role, she is a dedicated researcher specializing in the field of medical history. Shvarts holds significant positions as the Deputy Director-General of the International Society for the History of Medicine and as the Deputy Secretary General of the World Organization for the History of Medicine. Her research focuses on the examination of healthcare services' history and evolution in Israel, as well as the history of public medicine.

== Biography ==
Shifra Shvarts was born in June 1949 in Tel Aviv, Israel, to Yeheskel Leider and Batia Ben Ephraim. She grew up in Ashkelon and later moved to Beer Sheva in 1961. Shvarts obtained a bachelor's degree in history and geography, a master's degree in history, and a PhD in health sciences from Ben-Gurion University. She also pursued post-doctoral studies in the field of the history of health and management of health systems at the medical school of the University of Rochester in New York State during 1993–1994.

Since 1995, Shvarts has been a faculty member at Ben-Gurion University's Faculty of Health Sciences. She served as the chair of the Israel Society for the History of Medicine from 1996 to 1998 and as the director of the Department of Health System Management from 2001 to 2004.

Starting in 2002, Shvarts became a member of the Israel National Institute for Health Policy Research at the Gertner Institute for Epidemiology and Health Policy Research, located at the Sheba Medical Center in Ramat Gan. Additionally, since 2004, she has been a faculty member of the Center for Medical Education at Ben-Gurion University's Faculty of Health Sciences.

Between 2006 and 2017, Shvarts worked as a researcher at the Gertner Institute, primarily focusing on the development of health services in Israel and public health issues during the early years of the country. Her research notably examined the organized treatment of ringworm with irradiation in Israel and worldwide.

In 2008, Shvarts was elected deputy director-general of the International Society for the History of Medicine. In 2014, she assumed the role of vice president of the society and coordinator of the editorial board of its scientific journal, Vesalius.

== Academic research activities ==
Professor Shvarts is recognized as a pioneering researcher in the history of the Israeli health system. Her research emphasizes the significance of understanding the social, cultural, historical, and organizational foundations of the health system to comprehend its current functioning. Notably, she examined the development of the salaried physician model in Israel and analyzed the legislative process behind the compulsory health insurance law in 1994. Her research has provided valuable insights into the operation of the health system and has been extensively referenced, including in the Amora'i Commission Report that addresses the regulation of physicians' work in the Israeli public health system.

In 2002, Shvarts was appointed director of the Israel National Institute for Health Policy Research, acknowledging her scholarly contributions.

Aside from her research on the history of health services in Israel, Shvarts has also investigated the changes in the health system following the establishment of the State of Israel. Her studies focused on the necessity of healthcare system adaptations in the early years of the country and explored the various entities involved, such as the Israeli government, health funds, the Nurses' Federation, the General Federation of Labor, and the Physicians' Medical Federation.

In recent years, Shvarts has expanded her research to include the global context, with a specific focus on how different countries, including Israel, have approached the issue of irradiation treatment for ringworm. She also examined the broader health and social implications of this treatment as reflected in the legislation of the Law for Compensation of Ringworm Victims in Israel. Additionally, she conducted a historical and academic evaluation of the practical impact of the Compulsory National Health Insurance Law of 1994 on the Israeli health system.

=== Books ===
Shvarts has authored four books. She has also co-authored several volumes, and published over 140 papers and book chapters. These works cover various aspects of the organization of the health system throughout Israel's history. Her books provide a perspective on the political and organizational landscape during the Mandatory Palestine era of the 1920s and 1930s. They examine how the Jewish community in the Land of Israel tackled the challenge of organizing health services.

Her book "Kupat Holim, Histadruth, Memshala" (Health Fund, Labor Federation, Government), (published by the Ben-Gurion Heritage Institute in 2000) received the Einhorn Prize for Achievements in Hebrew Medical Literature in 2003.

In 2005, she was awarded the Honorable Order of Kentucky Colonels, recognizing her contributions to the community, state, and nation.

In 2012, her article titled "The Government of Israel and the Health Care of the Negev Bedouins under Military Government, 1948-1966" (co-authored by Borkan J., Muhammad M., and Sherf M.) was selected as one of the decade's highlights and shared through Cambridge University Press platforms.

== Selected works ==
- Shvarts S., Kupat- Holim Haclalit, The General Sick Fund, 1911-1937, Ben-Gurion Institute and Ben-Gurion University Press, 1997 (Hebrew, 221 pages).
- Shvarts S., Kupat Holim, The Histadruth and the Government, Ben-Gurion University Press and Beith Berl Press 2000 (Hebrew ,288 pages).
- Shvarts S., The Workers' Health Fund in Eretz Israel, The University of Rochester NY and Boydell & Brewer Press, UK.
- Schory-Rubin Z., Shvarts S., "Hadassah" for the Health of the People, Hasifria Hazionit, Jerusalem, 2003 (Hebrew, 222 pages),
- Doron H., Shvarts S., Medicine in the Community, Ben-Gurion University Press, 2004 (Hebrew, 264 pages).
- Shvarts S., Health and Zionism, The University of Rochester NY and Boydell & Brewer Press, UK, 2008 (322 pages).
- Shehory-Rubin Z., Shvarts S., "Hadassah" for the Health of the People, Jerusalem, 2012 (Dekel Academic Press, 296 pages).
- Shehory-Rubin Z., Shvarts S., Alexandra Belkind: A Story of a Pioneering Jewish Woman Doctor, Bahur Pub., 2012 (Hebrew,157 pages).
- Doron H., Shvarts S., Vinker S., Family Medicine in Israel, Ben-Gurion University Publication & the Bialik Institute, 2014 (Hebrew, 204 pages).
- Stoler-Liss, Shvarts. S., Shani M., To Be a Healthy Nation, Ben-Gurion University Publication & the Bialik Institute, 2016 (Hebrew, 338 pages).
- Bar Oz Y., Bin Nun G., Shvarts S., The Israeli Health Care System on the Operating Table - 25 years to the implementation of the National Health Insurance Law, The National Institute of Health Policy Research Publication, 2019 (Hebrew, 300 pages).

=== Editorship of collective volumes ===
- Chinitz D., Cohen J. (editors), Doron H., Ofer G., Shvarts S., Simchin E. (contributing editors), Government and Health Systems, Implications of Differing Involvements, John Wiley & Sons, 1998 (623 pages).
- Jotkowitz A., Shvarts S., Autonomy, Altruism and Authority in Medical Ethics: Essays in Honor of Professor Shimon Glick,, Nova Science Publishers Inc. NY, 2015 (205 pages).
- Shvarts S., Sadetzki S., Ringworm - Historical, Medical and Social Aspects of Its Treatment, Ben-Gurion University Publication, May 2018 (585 pages).
- Shvarts S., Bennun G., Haim Doron - My Way in the Health Care System- Conversations and Memories, Ben-Gurion University Publication. March 2019 (140 pages).
- Shvarts S., Sadetzki S., Ringworm and Irradiation: The Historical, Medical, and Legal Implications of the Forgotten Epidemic, Oxford University Press, 2022.
