= Pioneers for a Cure =

Pioneers For A Cure logo

CD cover of 'Am Yisrael Chai.'

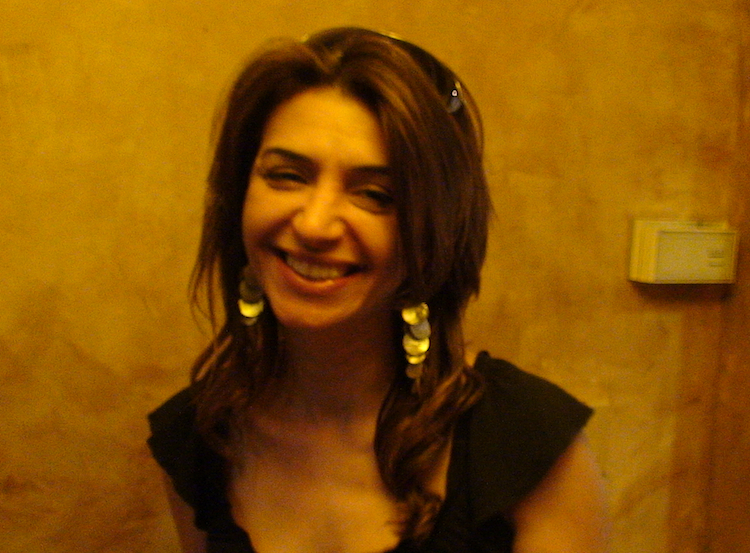
Israeli artist Mira Sasson

Pioneers For A Cure - Songs To Fight Cancer was started in 2008 to raise funds in support of organizations pioneering new methods of cancer treatment and research. Pioneers For A Cure is the largest showcase of cancer charities on the web. Called '[A] stellar model of artist-driven grassroots philanthropy' by National Geographic, the non-profit project records public domain songs, reinterpreted by contemporary artists and made available on the organization's website. for downloading for a modest donation. Over 100 songs have been recorded by dozens of artists from around the world including Suzanne Vega, Ben E. King, Tom Chapin, Tom Verlaine, Matt White and David Broza. Proceeds from song downloads are donated to artist-selected cancer charities such as the American Cancer Society, St. Jude Children's Hospital, the Breast Cancer Research Foundation, and Susan G. Komen for the Cure. Pioneers For A Cure is sponsored by Joodayoh, Inc., a 501(c)(3) organization

== History ==
The organization began with ‘The Postcard Project,’ gathering many Jewish musical artists to record the music of the pioneers of Israel (The Chalutzim). The songs were then posted on the Pioneers For A Cure website, where users make micro-donations to artist-selected cancer charities and receive song downloads in return.

‘The Postcard Project’ was inspired by the postcards used to disseminate the music of the Chalutzim in the years preceding the creation of the modern state of Israel. In an attempt to create a cultural base, composers were commissioned by the Keren Kayemet (now also known as The Jewish National Fund) to write new folk music, a soundtrack to the formation of the nation. The words and melodies were printed on postcards, which were mailed across Palestine, Europe, and Asia Minor.

‘The Israel Sessions’ is a more recent project of PFAC, featuring 16 songs recorded in Israel by producer Greg Wall and engineer Dave Richards in August, 2009. In addition, several songs have been recorded for the forthcoming ‘American Sessions,’ featuring classic American songs by popular artists.

In 2009, Pioneers released the single “Am Yisrael Chai,” featuring over 40 performers, edited by Keith Olsen and mixed by Bob Clearmountain.

The Pioneers For A Cure organization includes Music Producer Greg Wall, Executive Producer Beth Ravin, Chief Recording Engineer Dave Richards, artist Mira Sasson and Joodayoh, Inc. Executive Director Ricky Orbach.

In January 2011 Pioneers For A cure launched its new website, enabling donations to cancer charities. Website design and development by WhiteLabel.

On October 17, 2011, The Huffington Post featured an interview with Suzanne Vega in which the singer discusses her work with Pioneers For A Cure.

== The Pioneer Portraits ==
Israeli artist Mira Sasson has painted portraits of dozens of the Pioneers For A Cure artists, including Ben E. King, Lorin Sklamberg, David Broza, Basya Schechter, Neshama Carlebach, Noah Solomon, Tovah Feldshuh, and Dudu Fisher.

Sasson was born in 1965 in Bnei-Brak, Israel, and began drawing and painting as a child. In addition to other work, Sasson has illustrated and authored several children's books published in Israel. The books are currently being translated for publishing in the United States.

== Pioneers For A Cure Award Gala ==
On November 22, 2009, Pioneers For A Cure celebrated its first "Pioneer Of The Year Award" with a gala event at the Salmagundi Club in New York City with more than 250 friends and supporters. Attendees were welcomed by Harold Blond, President of the Israel Children's Cancer Foundation as well as Dana Ehrlich of the Israeli Consulate.

The "Pioneer Of The Year Award" was presented to Mira Sasson, whose artwork and portraits were on display at the gallery. Musical performers included Neshama Carlebach, Pharaoh's Daughter, Adrienne Cooper and Art Bailey, Greg Wall, Jeremiah Lockwood, Rashanim, Dov Rosenblatt and many more.

== Releases ==
=== iTunes Singles ===
1. Bill Evans (saxophonist), "Swing Low, Sweet Chariot" (Released August 25, 2011)
2. Tom Chapin, "Left My Gal in the Mountains" (Released July 22, 2011)
3. Randy Brecker, "The Ballad of John Henry" (Released June 20, 2011)

=== Israeli Songs To Fight Cancer (2011) ===
Volume 1:

1. Dov Rosenblatt, Diwon, Greg Wall & The Pioneer Ensemble, "Hatikvah (live)"
2. Stereo Sinai, "Purim Hayom"
3. Dudu Fisher, "Saleinu"
4. Y-Love with Diwon, "El Hama'ayan"
5. Sway Machinery, "Sov'vuni"
6. Hasidic New Wave, "Holem Tza’adi"
7. Pharaoh's Daughter, "Hinei Achal'la Bachalili"
8. Kohane Of Newark, "Yad Anugah"
9. Josh Nelson, "Chanita"
10. Smadar Levi, "Alei Giva"
11. Rashanim, "Seh Ug'di"

Volume 2:

1. Pioneers For A Cure Artists, "Am Yisrael Chai (radio edit)"
2. Ayelet Argaman & Asher Halpern, "Yerushalayim"
3. David Broza, "Ve'ulai"
4. Art Bailey's Orkestra Popilar Featuring Adrienne Cooper, "Shne Shoshanim"
5. Klezmerfest, "Chalutz, Chalutz Hineni"
6. Dudi Bar-David, "Bein Holot Midbar"
7. Peri Smilow, "Ani Maylelet"
8. Avi Piamenta, "Alei Giva"
9. Alessandra Hirsch, "Yesh Li Gan"
10. Alicia Svigals, "Kuma Echa"
11. Orcha Bamidbar 2:08 Zamir Choral

=== The American Collection (2011) ===
1. Randy Brecker, "Ballad of John Henry"
2. Tom Chapin, "Left My Gal in the Mountains"
3. Bill Evans (saxophonist), "Swing Low, Sweet Chariot"
4. Ben E. King, “Now Let Me Fly”
5. Gary Lucas, "Go Down Moses"
6. G. E. Smith and Taylor Barton, “Shenandoah”
7. Suzanne Vega, “The Streets of Laredo”
8. Matt White, “Tennessee Stud”

=== The Israel Sessions (2010) ===
1. Michal Cohen, “Sachkey” (Saul Tchernichowsky)
2. Natan Cohen, “Lo B'yom v'lo B'laila” (Chaim Nachman Bialik)
3. David D'or, “Hava Nagila”
4. Shay Gabso, “El Hatzipor” (Chaim Nachman Bialik)
5. Nurit Galron, “Im Eshkachech” (Menachem Mendel Dolitzky, Heyman Cohen)
6. Yehoram Gaon, “Shir Ha'avoda Vehamlacha” (Chaim Nachman Bialik)
7. The Genders, “Mah Yafim HaLeylot” (Yitzchak Katznelson)
8. Tzachi Halevy‘‘, “Al Neharot Bavel”
9. Amos Hoffman and Shai Bachar, “Bein Nahar Prat” (Chaim Nahman Bialik, Bracha Zefira)
10. Ilanit, “Numi, Numi” (Joel Engel, Yehiel Heilperin)
11. Inbal, “Hachnisini Tachat Knafech” (Chaim Nachman Bialik)
12. Uri Miles, “Hitragut” (Bracha Zefira, Paul Ben-Haim)
13. Noam Rotem, “Sham Shualim Yesh” (Kadish Yehuda Leib Silman)
14. Avi Toledano, “Hachnisini Tachat Knafech” and “Levad” (Avi Toledano)
15. Dudu Zakai, “Im Eshkachech” (Menachem Mendel Dolitzky, Heyman Cohen)

=== The Postcard Project (2009) ===
1. Ayelet Argaman and Alexander Halpern, “Yerushalayim” (Avigdor HaMeiri)
2. The Pioneer Artists, “Am Yisrael Chai,” Mixed by Bob Clearmountain (Traditional, Rabbi Shlomo Carlebach)
3. Emily Bindiger, “Tumba”
4. David Broza, “V'ulai” (Rachel Bluwstein, Yehudah Sharet)
5. Neshama Carlebach, “Tapuach Zahav” (Menashe Ravina, Shmuel Bass)
6. Adrienne Cooper and Art Bailey's Orkestra Popilar, “Shnei Shoshanim” (Mordechai Zeira, Yakov Orland)
7. Tovah Feldshuh, “Bein Nahar Prat” (Hayyim Nahman Bialik, Bracha Zefira)
8. Dudu Fisher, “Saleinu” (Levin Kipnis, Yedidyah Admon)
9. Seth Glass, “Omrim Yeshne Eretz” (Saul Tchernichovsky, Joel Engel)
10. Sam Halpern, “Meyn Shtetle Belz” (Jacob Jacobs, Alexander Olshanetsky)
11. Hasidic New Wave, “Holem Tza'adi” (Mordechai Zeira, Yitzchak Shenhar)
12. Klezmerfest, “Chalutz, Chalutz, Hineini”
13. Kohane of Newark, “Yad Anugah” (Zalman Shneur)
14. Later Prophets, “Sobu Tzion”
15. Smadar Levi, “Alei Giva” (Nahum Nardi, Avraham Broides)
16. Frank London, Rob Schwimmer and Joshua Nelson, “Gam Hayom” (Shalom Postolsky, Levi Ben-Amitai)
17. New York Voices, “S'Vivon” (Levin Kipnis)
18. Pharaoh's Daughter, “Hinei Achal'la Bachalili,” Mixed by Bob Clearmountain (Mordechai Zeira, Yitzchak Shehar)
19. Avi Piamenta, “Alei Giva” (Nahum Nardi, Avraham Broides)
20. Yosi Piamenta, “Shedemati” (Yedidyah Admon, Yitzchak Shenhar)
21. Rashanim, “Seh Ug'di” (Matityahu Shelem)
22. RebbeSoul, “Shir Shomer”
23. Abbi Rose, “Hazorim B'dimah” (Matityahu Shelem)
24. Karen Rosen, “Yeled Kat” (Levin Kipnis, D. Chitrik)
25. Dov Rosenblatt, “Hallelujah” (Avraham and Vardina Shlonsky)
26. Lorin Sklamberg, “Lu Hayiti Tsipor Kanaf/Sh'Chav Beni” (Noah Pines, N. Heifetz), (Rabbi Shalom Charitonov, Emanuel HaRusi)
27. Noah Solomon, “El Yivne HaGalil”
28. Stereo Sinai, “Purim Hayom”
29. Alicia Svigals, “Kuma, Echa” (Shalom Postolski, Yitzchak Shenhar)
30. The Sway Machinery, “Sov'vuni”
31. Y-Love & Diwon, “El Hamayan” (Yaakov David Kamzon, Emanuel Amiran)
32. The Zamir Chorale, “Orcha Bamidbar” (David Zahavi, Yaakov Fichman)

== Charities ==
(The following charities were selected by the artists to receive the proceeds from song downloads:)

1. A Step Ahead / Cancer Research UK
2. American Lung Association
3. Amutat Chaim
4. Amutat Yahad Nit'atzem
5. Breast Cancer Research Foundation
6. Cancer patients of the Phyllis Newman Health Initiative
7. Chai Lifeline
8. Chai Lifeline Children's Cancer Camp Simcha
9. Children's Department of Rambam Hospital
10. Dana–Farber Cancer Institute
11. Dr. Allyson J. Ocean Research Fund - Weill Cornell Medical College
12. Ellen's Run
13. Ezer Mizion
14. Gabrielle's Angel Foundation
15. Israel Cancer Association (ICA)
16. Israel Cancer Research Fund
17. Israel Children's Cancer Foundation
18. Kaplan Medical Center Throat Cancer Fund
19. Kav L'Chaim
20. Larger Than Life
21. Lymphoma Research Foundation
22. Melanoma Research Foundation
23. Memorial Sloan–Kettering Cancer Center
24. Multiple Myeloma Research Foundation
25. National Breast Cancer Coalition
26. EIF's National Colorectal Cancer Research Alliance
27. New York CancerCare
28. One In Nine
29. Rofeh Cholim Cancer Society
30. Schneider Children's Medical Center of Israel
31. Soroka Medical Center Cancer Departments
32. St. Barnabas Cancer Centers
33. Susan G. Komen for the Cure
