= Gloria del Paraguay =

- Born: Gloria Criscione Pineda
- Origin: Paraguay
- Genres: Opera / Folkloric Paraguayan Music / Folkloric Latin American Music
- Occupations: Soprano, writer
- Website: www.gloriadelparaguay.com

Gloria Criscione Pineda, known artistically as "Gloria del Paraguay" is a Paraguayan soprano, recognized for her versatile voice. She performs both in classical music concerts as well as singing arias. She sings arias as a lyric soprano, as a dramatic soprano, and as a mezzo-soprano. Her repertoire also includes folklore from Paraguay and Latin America.

== Early life and education ==
Gloria Criscione Pineda is daughter of an Italian father and a Spanish mother; she was born in Paraguay. She started her studies at the age of 5 years old. She attended the School of Fine Arts where she began studying declamation and dance. At the age of eleven she became a student of the famous teacher Aurelia Camihor Lofrucio. At the age of twelve she sang as a soloist of the Symphonic Orchestra and the Paraguayan Athenaeum Choir. She was the lead singer of various zarzuelas or musical comedies and operettas, then starting her own opera company known as the "Compañia Paraguaya de Comedias Musicales". She has a Masters in Psychology and Social Sciences. She is an expert in Nutrition. She also studied Marketing and Journalism in Geneva.

== Career ==
For a long time, she dedicated herself to singing folkloric Paraguayan music as well as Latin American music. She compiled and rescued the African rhythms of Cambá Kuá – Paraguay. She went on long tours to Europe, Asia, the United States of America and Latin America. She has 33 recordings. Her first recording took place in Portugal.

She was the first Latin American performer on 5 February 1995, to sing as a soloist in a concert at the Manhattan Center in New York City. She was the first singer to record the three most difficult minutes of the tenor of the Tosca Opera "E lucevan le stelle".

In Spain, her performances on television and radio brought her recognition. She was presented with the "España de Oro" prize as the best Spanish language singer, and also won the "T” prize that stands for triumphant three consecutive times as the "Best Singer in Spanish Language". In Chile, she was part of the jury at the "Viña del Mar International Song Festival", as well as at the "OTI Festival".

As a poet, Pineda was invited to the fourth Book Fair in Paris, and her poems are part of the compilation of Paraguayan poems of the PEN CLUB, that gives awards to the best hundred Paraguayan writers. She has five published books whose titles are "Cristal", "Cuarzo y Cristal", "Transmutaciòn y Silencio", "Clave y Recuerdos" and "Medicina Natural, su alternativa".

She took some years off stage to organize a Foundation for the Arts, Sciences and Technology "Gloria International Foundation". Now Gloria del Paraguay is back on stage, singing in concerts to raise money for her Foundation, which is one of the singer's priorities.

== Awards and honours ==
- At 13 years of age, she represented Paraguay for the first time at the Festival Sudamericano in Salta, Argentina, winning first prize for "Performance and Song".
- She was proposed by the Universidad Nacional de Asunción for the PRINCIPE DE ASTURIAS award for her work in integrating Latin American nations.
- She was received by Pope John Paul II as the spokeswoman of all Latin American artists.
- She was nominated Cultural Traveling Representative of the Republic of Paraguay and also Ambassador of the Arts.
- She was nominated Peace Ambassador in 2007 by the International Intrareligious Federation for World Peace, whose headquarters are in the United States of America. This foresaid Federation in recognized by the United Nations.
- By resolution of the Municipality of Asunción, she was named Beloved Daughter of the city.
- In the year 2003, the Universidad Iberoamericana, awarded her with the "Honors Diploma", engraving her name in a plaque that is part of a mural at the University, that sets example for all future generations of students.
- The Office of the Public Defender of the Republic of Paraguay nominated her "Leading Woman of Paraguay".
- She was selected in between 141 singers, at the Manhattan Center in New York City, to be one of the three sopranos to sing at the first soprano concert, for world peace, “The Sopranos World Concert, for World Pace” (this concert will be repeated around the world, in sites that the United Nations have declared World Heritage). In unison with soprano Seiko Lee from Japan and M. Zuri from the United States of America. In this concert various orchestra directors were summoned: David Eaton from the United States of America, famous Director of the New York City Symphony, Luca Testa from Italy, who is a specialist in Italian opera with particular emphasis in operas of stravagant realism also known as Verismo Operas, the styles of Verdi and Puccini, and Florentín Giménez, from Paraguay, who has composed one hundred chamber orchestra pieces of which ten of them are Paraguayan musical comedies also known as zarzuelas, four symphonic poems, two ballet suites, and four concerts for piano, violin and violoncello.
- In February 2009, the Universidad Metropolitana de Asunción, acknowledges Gloria Criscione Pineda, for all her positive actions in favor of building a more dignified, democratic and fair society; as one of the women who helped make a difference in Paraguayan History.
