= Israel in the Eurovision Song Contest 2004 =

- Eurovision Song Contest 2004
- Participating broadcaster: Israel Broadcasting Authority (IBA)
- Country: Israel
- Selection process: Artist: Internal Selection; Song: Kdam Eurovision 2004
- Selection date: Artist: 13 November 2003; Song: 5 February 2004

Competing entry
- Song: "Leha'amin"
- Artist: David D'Or
- Songwriters: David D'Or; Ofer Meiri; Ehud Manor

Placement
- Semi-final result: Failed to qualify (11th)

Participation chronology

Israel was represented at the Eurovision Song Contest 2004 with the song "Leha'amin", written by David D'Or, Ofer Meiri, and Ehud Manor, and performed by David D'Or. The Israeli participating broadcaster, the Israel Broadcasting Authority (IBA), selected its entry through the national final Kdam Eurovision 2004, after having previously selected the performer internally. The national final took place on 5 February 2004 and featured four songs. "Leha'amin" emerged as the winning song after gaining the most points following the combination of a jury vote, an audience vote and a public televote.

Israel competed in the semi-final of the Eurovision Song Contest which took place on 12 May 2004. Performing during the show in position 5, "Leha'amin" was not announced among the top 10 entries of the semi-final and therefore did not qualify to compete in the final. It was later revealed that Israel placed eleventh out of the 22 participating countries in the semi-final with 57 points.

== Background ==
Prior to the 2004 contest, the Israel Broadcasting Authority (IBA) had participated in the Eurovision Song Contest representing Israel twenty-six times since its first entry in 1973. It has won the contest on three occasions: in 1978 with the song "A-Ba-Ni-Bi" by Izhar Cohen and the Alphabeta, in 1979 with the song "Hallelujah" by Milk and Honey, in 1998 with the song "Diva" by Dana International. In 2003, "Words for Love" performed by Lior Narkis placed nineteenth.

As part of its duties as participating broadcaster, IBA organises the selection of its entry in the Eurovision Song Contest and broadcasts the event in the country. The broadcaster confirmed its participation in the contest on 18 September 2003. To select its entry for the 2004 contest, IBA conducted an internal selection to select the artist and a national final to select the song.

== Before Eurovision ==
=== Artist selection ===
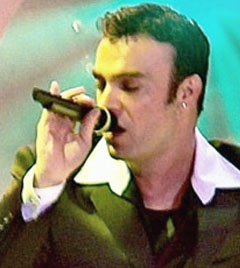
David D'Or was internally selected to represent Israel in 2004

On 13 November 2003, IBA announced that David D'Or was selected by a special committee consisting of music industry professionals and public representatives as its performer for the Eurovision Song Contest 2004. Among artists that were highly considered before D'Or was ultimately selected included Hamsa, Ninet Tayeb, Zehava Ben, and Ron Shoval. The members of the committee were Avraham Natan (Chairman of IBA), Yaakov Shaham (Chairman of IBA), Rachel Kremerman (member of the IBA Executive Committee), Menachem Granit (Director of entertainment at Kol Yisrael), Yossi Meshulam (programme director of Channel 1), Izchak Sonnenschein (Head of Israeli Eurovision delegation), Yossi Elias (Rating), Eti Abramov (Yedioth Ahronoth), Hana Goldberg (lyricist), Yaakov Naveh (singer), Ezra Suleiman (CEO of the Israeli Mediterranean Music Association), Lior Narkis (who represented Israel in 2003), Gali Atari (who won Eurovision for Israel in 1979 as part of Milk and Honey), and Liel Kolet (singer).

=== Kdam Eurovision 2004 ===
The song that David D'Or represented Israel with in Istanbul was selected through the national final Kdam Eurovision 2004. Four songs were chosen from over 250 submissions by the committee and announced on 19 January 2004. Performances of the four competing songs were filmed earlier on 18 January 2004 and presented on 5 February 2004 during a break in a televised Maccabi Tel Aviv Euroleague basketball game at the Nokia Stadium in Tel Aviv, hosted by Merav Miller and broadcast on Channel 1. The winning song, "Leha'amin", was selected by a combination of the votes from the committee members (40%), the audience at the game (30%) and a public televote conducted through telephone and SMS (30%). The audience vote registered approximately 1,000 votes, while the televote registered approximately 25,000 votes. The basketball game was watched by 227,000 viewers in Israel with a market share of 13.7%.

Final – 5 February 2004
R/O	Song	Songwriter(s)	Jury (40%)	Public		Total	Place
R/O	Song	Songwriter(s)	Jury (40%)	Audience (30%)	Televote (30%)	Total	Place
1	"Freedom"	David D'Or, Ofer Meiri	0%	25%	18%	12.9%	3
2	"Yamim Tovim" (ימים טובים)	David D'Or, Simon Buskilla	0%	17%	4%	6.3%	4
3	"Bo'u Mal'achim" (בואו מלאכים)	David D'Or, Ehud Manor	40%	11%	12%	22.9%	2
4	"Leha'amin" (להאמין)	David D'Or, Ofer Meiri	60%	47%	66%	57.9%	1

== At Eurovision ==
It was announced that the competition's format would be expanded to include a semi-final in 2004. According to the rules, all nations with the exceptions of the host country, the "Big Four" (France, Germany, Spain and the United Kingdom), and the ten highest placed finishers in the 2003 contest are required to qualify from the semi-final on 12 May 2004 in order to compete for the final on 15 May 2004; the top ten countries from the semi-final progress to the final. On 23 March 2004, a special allocation draw was held which determined the running order for the semi-final and Israel was set to perform in position 5, following the entry from Latvia and before the entry from Andorra. During the rehearsal week of the contest, David D'Or left Istanbul to be with his father, who had to have one of his legs amputated due to complications of diabetes. His father has since died. At the end of the semi-final, Israel was not announced among the top 10 entries and therefore failed to qualify to compete in the final. It was later revealed that Israel placed eleventh in the semi-final, receiving a total of 57 points.

The semi-final received a market share of 19% in Israel, while the final received a market share of 11% in Israel. Both shows were televised live on Channel 1. IBA appointed Merav Miller as its spokesperson to announce the Israeli votes during the final.

=== Voting ===
Below is a breakdown of points awarded to Israel and awarded by Israel in the semi-final and grand final of the contest. The nation awarded its 12 points to Greece in the semi-final and to Ukraine in the final of the contest.

Following the release of the televoting figures by the EBU after the conclusion of the competition, it was revealed that a total of 27,192 televotes were cast in Israel during the two shows: 12,895 votes during the semi-final and 14,297 votes during the final.

==== Points awarded to Israel ====
Points awarded to Israel (Semi-final)
Score	Country
12 points	
10 points	
8 points	
7 points	Portugal
6 points	Malta
5 points	Albania; Romania
4 points	Spain; Turkey
3 points	Andorra; Belarus; Greece; Serbia and Montenegro
2 points	Belgium; Cyprus; Denmark; Finland; Netherlands; United Kingdom
1 point	Austria; Germany

==== Points awarded by Israel ====
Points awarded by Israel (Semi-final)
Score	Country
12 points	Greece
10 points	Ukraine
8 points	Serbia and Montenegro
7 points	Netherlands
6 points	Malta
5 points	Denmark
4 points	Albania
3 points	Cyprus
2 points	Latvia
1 point	Lithuania

Points awarded by Israel (Final)
Score	Country
12 points	Ukraine
10 points	Greece
8 points	Spain
7 points	Serbia and Montenegro
6 points	Russia
5 points	Sweden
4 points	Malta
3 points	Cyprus
2 points	Turkey
1 point	Romania
