= Mira Sasson =

Israeli artist (born 1965)

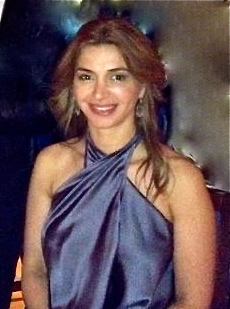
Israeli Artist Mira Sasson

Mira Sasson (Hebrew: מירה סאסון) is an Israeli artist living in the United States. She is the resident artist for Pioneers For A Cure - Songs To Fight Cancer, a non-profit organization that raises funds for cancer treatment, cancer research, and cancer care through song downloads. In addition to the dozens of artist portraits Sasson has painted for Pioneers For A Cure, she has illustrated and authored several children's books.

== Biography ==
Born in 1965, Mira Sasson was raised in a small ultra-orthodox community in Bnei-Brak, Israel. Mira was expected to concentrate her studies on religion and was not permitted to express herself artistically.

Mira grew and quickly became a passionate artist, always seen with a pencil in hand. With no formal training, her talents excelled and easily allowed her to move on to other mediums, such as oil on canvas. Her fascination with faces has been a common thread throughout her career. From the beginning, she was able to capture the inner essence of her subjects and draw the viewer into the intimacy of the painting. Her experience in oil paintings came in handy later in a project she was involved in to document PfaC artists for a project.

At age 35, Mira unleashed her talent in writing. She wrote and illustrated a collection of children's books. She also wrote weekly articles for a newspaper in Bat Shemesh, Israel.

In 2002, Mira moved to America. Working as a resident artist for Pioneers for a Cure, Mira painted portraits of many musical artists whose talents helped to raise funds for various cancer charities. Her work was displayed in the Salmagundi Art Club in New York City, and she was honoured with the "Pioneer of the Year Award". Mira was also involved with Pioneers for a Cure's creation of the first Megillah for the iPad, which showcased her talents with watercolour.

In addition to her private work, Mira uses her artistic gifts to help children with special needs in The Friendship Circle. Her ongoing work with this program has enriched the lives of young children and teens.

Over the last three years, Mira has developed an original technique to create unique works of art. Nails, threads, and fibres are woven into wood to create beautiful images. Included in her current show, The Fibers of Time, Mira not only unveils her latest works but also exhibits her art from her many years as an artist.

== Pioneers for a Cure ==
Mira Sasson is working on a series of portraits of singers who have contributed songs to Pioneers For A Cure - Songs To Fight Cancer. These portraits include Suzanne Vega, Ben E. King, Tovah Feldshuh, Lorin Sklamberg, David Broza, Taylor Barton, Yosi Piamenta, Basya Schechter, Neshama Carlebach, Noah Solomon and Dudu Fisher.

In addition, Sasson contributed the cover artwork for the September 2011 release on iTunes of the 'Israeli Songs To Fight Cancer' compilation released by Pioneers For A Cure. The collection features songs by Dov Rosenblatt, Josh Nelson, Dudu Fisher, Y-Love and others.

== Pioneers for a Cure Award Gala ==
On 22 November 2009, Pioneers For A Cure celebrated its first "Pioneer Of The Year Award" with a gala event at the Salmagundi Club in New York City with more than 250 friends and supporters. Attendees were welcomed by Harold Blond, President of the Israel Children's Cancer Foundation, as well as Dana Ehrlich of the Israeli Consulate.

The "Pioneer Of The Year Award" was presented to Mira Sasson, whose artwork and portraits were on display at the gallery. Musical performers included Neshama Carlebach, Pharaoh's Daughter, Adrienne Cooper and Art Bailey, Greg Wall, Jeremiah Lockwood, Rashanim, Dov Rosenblatt and many more.

Friendship Circle NJ

In 2014, Mira Sasson started working with Friendship Circle NJ, an organization that promotes awareness and understanding of people with special needs. Using paint and collage, Mira develops art projects and guides children and teens at the program to create personal artwork. The program inspires and enriches the lives of the participants while creating a seamless circle of friendship.

== See also ==
- Visual arts in Israel
