= David D'Or =

Israeli musical artist

David D'Or דוד ד'אור
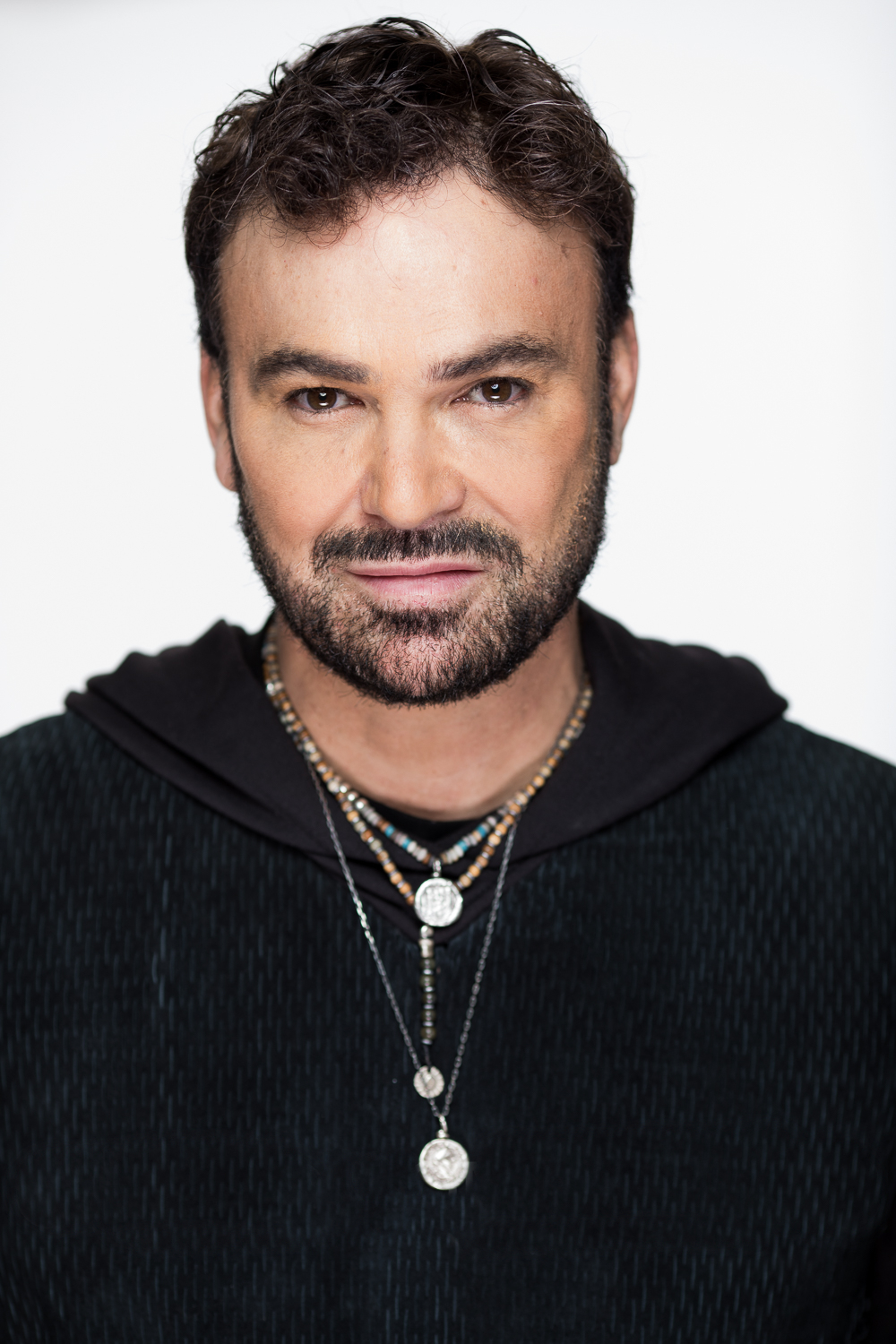
- David D'or

Background information
- Born: David Nehaisi; October 2, 1965 (age 61); Holon, Israel
- Genres: Classical crossover, operatic pop, Pop, rock, dance, folk, klezmer, classical, opera, baroque arias
- Occupations: singer, composer, songwriter
- Instrument: Vocals
- Years active: 1985–present
- Labels: Hed Arzi, Aviv, SISU, Big Beat/Ada
- Website: www.daviddor.com

David D'Or (Hebrew: דוד ד'אור; born David Nehaisi on October 2, 1965) is an Israeli singer, composer, and songwriter. A countertenor with a vocal range of more than four octaves, he is a three-time winner of the Israeli "Singer of the Year" and "Best Vocal Performer" awards. He was also chosen to represent Israel in the Eurovision Song Contest 2004, at which he placed 11th in the semi-final. By February 2008, nine of his albums had gone platinum.

D'Or performs a wide variety of music, including pop, rock, dance, folk, klezmer, Yemenite prayers, holy music, ancient chants, classical, opera, and baroque arias (in the original Italian).

== Biography ==
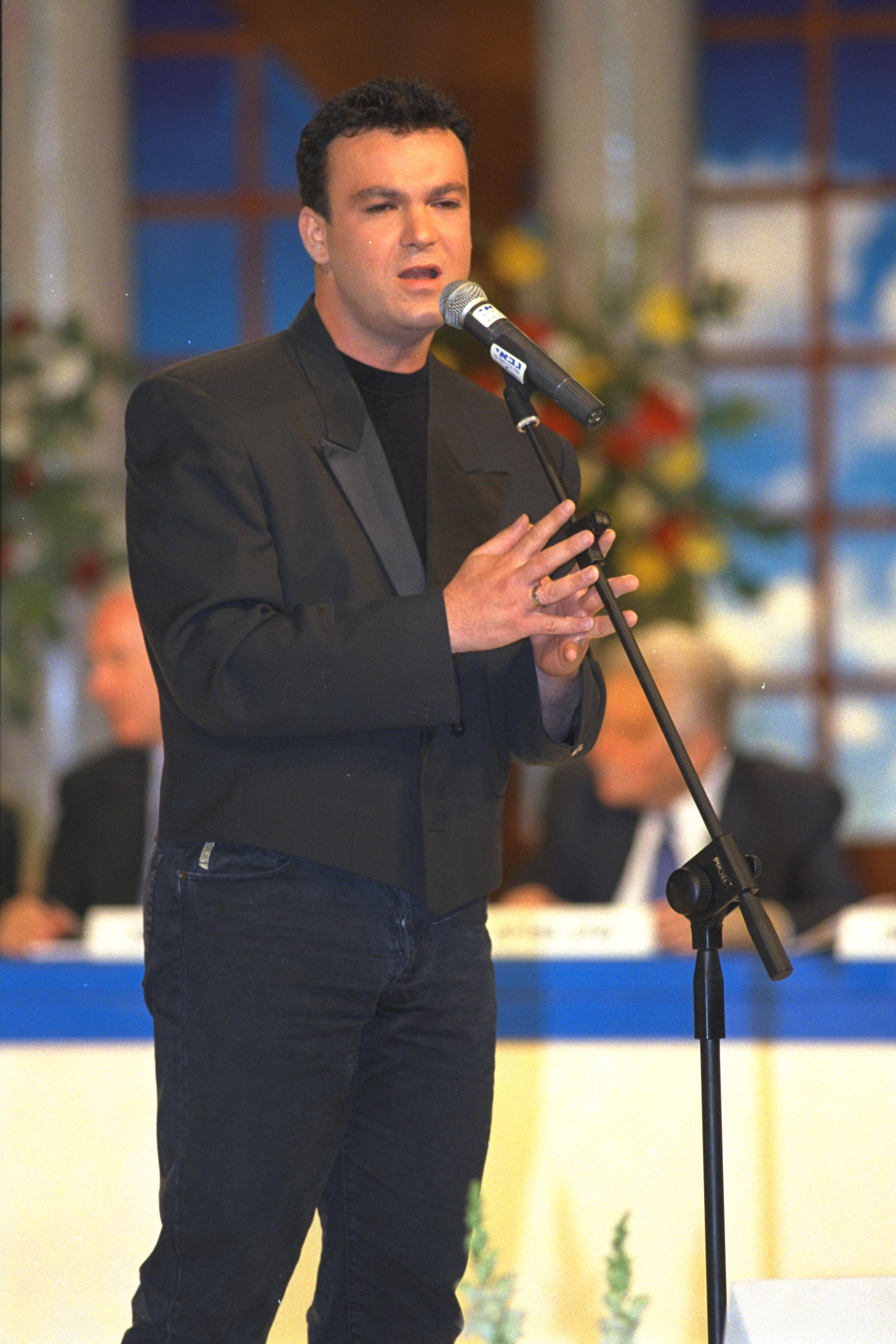
David D'or singing at Israel Prize ceremony

D'Or was born in Holon, Israel, to a family of Libyan Jews. His great-grandfather was a rabbi in the Libyan Jewish community, and his father brought the family from Libya to Israel. His brother, Yaniv d'Or, is also a professional singer.

From an early age, D'Or displayed an interest in singing, though his parents initially encouraged him toward more conventional professional paths such as law or medicine. When his voice changed in adolescence, he made a conscious effort to preserve his capacity for high-register singing. At that time, countertenor-like vocal techniques were not common in Israel, and he described the cultural climate as being machoistic. Though initially hesitant to perform with this voice, he later embraced it, describing the combination of high and low registers as an integral part of his identity: "[I]t was like using [only] part of me", he said. "I could sing low and I could sing high; [I]t's like using only one hand...you have two hands, and you're using only your right hand."

During his three years of military service, D'Or served as a singer in the Israeli Military Band, and in 1985–86 he was in Lehakat Pikud Merkaz, and took part in the recording of Be'sha'araikh Yerikho. Though thankful for the opportunity, and remaining in support of Israel's military, D'Or felt that music and the army didn't mesh well together, and viewed his years in the army as a difficult period in terms of his musical development.

D'Or is married to Pazit, formerly a jewelry designer and now his manager. They met as high school students in Bat Yam. They have two children and reside in the Israeli town of Savyon near Tel Aviv.

== Music career ==
After his army service, D'Or and two army colleagues (Benny Nadler and Rivi Ben-Basht) formed a trio named HaShlishiya (the "Threesome"), but it disbanded after just one single. A few months later he formed another group, named Kav 4 ("Fourth Chord"), but it disbanded before completing its inaugural album. At the same time he was invited by the Israeli National Theater ("Habima Theater") to be in various performances, among them "Blood Marriage", "Cabaret", "Cry the Beloved Country (music by Kurt Weill)", and "Tartuffe (music by Giya Kancheli)." D’Or performed at the Habima Theater for four years, during which time he received outstanding reviews, such as Maariv's review of Cry the Beloved Country: "D'or's outstanding voice is meant for great parts. His voice and presence embraces the audience, who showed their appreciation by a lengthy standing ovation". He was at the same time professionally trained, and tutored by Soprano Miriam Melzer, from 1987 to 1990 at the Jerusalem Academy of Music and Dance, from which he graduated.

D’Or has said that at the beginning of his career he told each production office that he would not work on Shabbat, even when told that much performance work took place then.

In 1991, D'Or was accepted into and enrolled in the classical music department of the Jerusalem Conservatory. That year D'Or also began his musical career as a classical tenor. Zubin Mehta, music director of the Israel Philharmonic Orchestra, heard D'Or sing and invited him to perform as soloist in "Carmina Burana" by Carl Orff, performing in a series of concerts all over the country. Yediot Achronot reviewed his performance, writing: "David D’Or is a contra tenor with tone, colour and exceptional style well beyond other soloists".

=== 1992–99: Early years ===
In 1992, D’Or released his first album entitled David D'Or. It included hit song "Yad Anuga", also known as "Yad Agunah" ("Gentle Hand", or "Tender Hand"), which was remixed by Nelson "Paradise" Roman and Bump, produced by Ofer Meiri and Yehudit Ravitz, released as a vinyl 12-inch single by Big Beat Records and Magnet Records, and reached # 3 in the most frequently played charts in Great Britain.

His second album, Be'govah Mishtane ("Changing Altitudes", or "Changing Heights"), released January 1, 1993, included the song "Ani Af" ("I Fly", or "I am Flying"), and what was to become an iconic Israeli song, "Tishmor al HaOlam Yeled" ("Watch Over the World, Child", or "Protect Our World, Child"). The latter song was subsequently covered by Liel Kolet and Scorpions' singer Klaus Meine, as well as by Shuly Nathan. The CD consisting mostly of songs composed by D'Or was even more successful than its predecessor and went platinum. Globus reviewed the album and wrote the following: "In an age in which it seems that a good voice is not particularly necessary to be a singer, David D'Or comes along and reminds anyone who had forgotten that not only can things be different, they need to be different. Simply put, D'Or sings beautifully and knows how to choose songs that fit his unique voice...One has to credit him for fulfilling his mission with bravura; his voice on stage sounds as good and convincing as it does in the recording studio. The wide variety of styles that he incorporates in his music, along with his superb vocal ability, allows him to appeal to adults and youths alike." Later in 1993, D'Or participated in the televised competition to represent Israel in the Eurovision Song Contest 1993 (Kdam Erovizion), with his song "Parpar," and came in fourth place.

Side by side with his classical education, D'Or was drawn to ethnic music. This interest led him in 1995 to record with Moroccan Israeli Shlomo Bar and the band "Habrera Hativit" ("The Natural Gathering", "Natural Choice", or "Natural Selection"; composed of ethnic musicians) and release a popular new album, David & Shlomo (also known as David and Salomon). Maariv reviewed the album, writing: "The Duet of David and Shlomo is wonderful and stunning." He also joined Dudu Fisher, Meir Banai, and Eran Zur in the song "Lisa" on the 1994 album "Radio Blah-Blah" by the Israeli band "The Friends of Natasha".

In 1995, as Israel and the Holy See had just established political relations, D'Or also received an invitation from the Vatican to perform for Pope John Paul II. His repertoire at this concert, which was broadcast worldwide and received enthusiastic reviews, united original ethnic music with European classics, and included a song D'Or composed specifically for the Pope in both Hebrew and Italian. He was the first Israeli singer to sing in Hebrew for the Pope. After he performed for the Pope ("He held my hand and gave me his blessing", D'Or said. "I just kept thinking: 'Here I am, little David from Israel, singing in Hebrew...It was a very powerful thing.'"), D'Or was invited to perform in Italy, where he appeared on TV shows such as Maurizio Costanzo on Channel 1, and Paulo Limiti on Channel 2. The Italian press, such as Corriere della Sera and La Repubblica, gave D'Or positive reviews.

In 1997, D'Or released his fourth album, David D’Or & Etti Ankri, with Etti Ankri, which included them singing a duet of Ankri's hit "Lolita". That year as well the Ra'anana Symphony Orchestra commissioned an original work, a small cantata, specially written for D'Or, entitled "The Children of God" ("Yeldai Ha Elohim"). The lyrics consist of sentences that appear in the Jewish, Muslim, and Christian religions, emphasizing the message of "love your neighbor." The work was composed by Georgian-born Israeli composer Josef Bardanashvilli, subsequently opened in a series of concerts of the orchestra in Israel and throughout the US, and was a great success.

=== 2000s: Singer of the Year and Eurovision ===
His fifth album entitled Baneshama ("In the Soul") was released on March 31, 2001, with 11 of the 12 tracks written by D'Or.

In 2001, D'Or was named Israel's Singer of the Year and Best Vocal Performer.

In 2002, he was again named Israel's Singer of the Year (receiving the Tamuz Prize) and Best Vocal Performer, and also received the award for Best Song for "Kol HaCochavim" at the Israel Music Awards. After 9/11 D'Or and Etti Ankri, Zehava Ben, Arkady Duchin, and other Israeli singers recorded the title song "Yesh Od Tikvah" ("Our Hope Endures"), for which D'Or wrote the music and lyrics, on the CD Yesh Od Tikvah/You've Got a Friend. The CD released by Hed Arzi in 2002 benefited Israeli terror victims, with all proceeds going to "NATAL": the "Israel Trauma center for Victims of Terror and War".

D’Or then released David D’Or & the Philharmonic; Live Concert on April 1, 2003, which successfully broke traditional barriers as it combined a medley of pop, classical, and opera which he sang, backed by the 120-member Israel Philharmonic Orchestra. The album, which included among other pieces "Agnus Dei", "Orfeo", "Let Me Cry", and "The Phantom of the Opera" reached gold status in just two weeks. The newspaper Yediot Achronot reviewed the CD in its opera section and wrote the following: "D’Or excelled...with his fantastic counter tenor voice...in a most exciting performance. All in all, this is a very moving CD." That year D'Or also released the CD "Shma Israel", and "The Hidden Gate: Jewish Music from Around the World" was released by Rounder Records on July 1, featuring what The Independent described as "haunting stuff" from David D'Or.

In November 2003, the Israel Broadcasting Authority (the "IBA") chose D'Or to represent the country in the Eurovision Song Contest 2004. D'Or represented Israel in the contest in Istanbul, with the song "Leha'amin" (To Believe), which he co-wrote with Ehud Manor. The song was chosen on February 5, 2004, in voting during the program "Israel Selects a Song", held during a break in a televised Maccabi Tel Aviv Euroleague basketball game in Tel Aviv at which videos of four songs sung by D'Or were shown. The vote was by both a special IBA Eurovision Committee (including prior Israeli entrants Lior Narkis and Gali Atari), which accounted for 40% of the vote, and a televote by viewers, who accounted for the remaining 60% of the vote. The basketball game attracted 13.7% of Israeli TV viewers. The song won 60% of the jury's vote, and 66% of the viewers' televotes.

During Eurovision rehearsal week, D'Or left Istanbul to be with his father who was suffering from diabetes and had been rushed to a hospital where one of his legs had to be amputated. D'Or then returned to Istanbul to perform on May 12, 2004, and placed 11th in the semi-final failing to qualify to the final, while 19% of Israeli viewers watched on television. His father has since died.

On June 1, 2004, he released the CD entitled Le Haamin ("To Believe"). His performance of the song was also on the official Eurovision compilation CD, Eurovision Song Contest: Istanbul 2004, released that year by CMC Entertainment. In 2004, he also collaborated with Sarit Hadad to record the DVD "Pets in Tunes. His year was capped by his being awarded the titles of Israeli 2004 "Singer of the Year" and "Best Vocal Performer".

In January 2005, he released a clubby, English electronic house vinyl 12" single of George Michael's "Careless Whisper" on the 3 Lanka and Hed Arzi labels, produced and mixed by DJ Amiad, with remixes by Future Funk and Michi Lange. The track attracted international interest.

On March 27, 2006, D'Or released Kmo HaRuach ("Like the Wind"), which included duets with Israeli singers Arkadi Duchin, Arik Einstein, Shlomi Shabat, and Ehud Banai, and the song "Zman Ahava" ("Time for Love") with Ehud Banai. D'Or composed all the songs on the album, combining world music with jazz, Thai, and Indian elements. In 2006, D'Or also collaborated with rapper Subliminal for the song "Ten Koah" ("Give Me Strength") on Subliminal's hip hop album, Just When You Thought it Was Over. He also joined Shlomo Bar in a duet of "Atzlano Kafar Todrah" for the CD The Rough Guide to the Music of Israel released on February 17, 2006, and sang the song "Travelling North" or "Heading North" ("Nose'a Tzafonah") on the 2006 CD To the North with Love ("Latsafon Be'ahava").

On May 19, 2007, D’Or performed with soprano Seiko Lee in the world premier performance of the 40-minute ten-movement "peace cantata", "Halelu—Songs of David", in Belgrade, Serbia. The concert was televised to six other Eastern European countries. The composition for solo voices, chorus, and orchestra, was a collaborative effort of D’Or and American composer/conductor David Eaton, music director of the New York City Symphony, who conducted the combined Belgrade Philharmonic Orchestra and the 120-voice choir of the Academic Cultural Artistic Society. Halelu is sung in English, Hebrew, Arabic, and Latin, with greetings of peace of Judaism, Christianity, and Islam figuring prominently in the lyrical content of several movements, and with Psalm 113 (sung in Hebrew by D’Or) as the basis of the 4th movement. He then released Halelu—Songs of David; Cantata for Peace (2007), in which he was accompanied by Lee, the Ra'anana Symphony Orchestra, and members of the Philharmonia Chorus of Israel.

D'Or sang for Martin Luther King III at a Middle East Peace Initiative (MEPI) Conference in the summer of 2007 in Tel Aviv. King was in tears as D'Or finished his rendition of "Summertime", and the crowd was on its feet cheering. King was so moved that he extended an invitation to D'Or to sing at the 2008 "Realize the Dream" celebration honoring King's birthday at the Covenant Avenue Baptist Church in Harlem, New York – the last church in New York City that Martin Luther King Jr., spoke at prior to his 1968 assassination. D'Or obliged with a performance of "Amazing Grace" before a crowd including former President Bill Clinton and Dr. King who was reduced to tears.

He also performed in the 2007 WOMAD (World of Music, Arts and Dance) festival concert, and in reviewing his performance BBC Radio referred to his voice as "sensational". D'Or described an experience that he had singing at the festival as follows: "I had a concert in the Canary Islands...in the WOMAD Festival in front of something like 20,000 people, and then I saw just in front of me, a group of Palestinian young people with a huge Palestinian flag. And at the beginning I was very tense because I didn't know what their intentions were. I closed my eyes and said 'Look, you speak always about the power of music and how music can get people close to each other', and I was like aiming to their heart, and I'm singing especially for them, and then when I opened my eyes and I saw those people dancing with the Palestinian flag and singing with me together, and it was for me like an amazing sight, because this is something that I don't think ever happened before. I don't know why this world...is choosing...always...war and hate, because things are much easier to solve if you just want to solve them, that's what I feel. And maybe it's naïve, but this is my belief."

On December 11, 2007, D'Or released Live Concert. D'Or composed most of the songs on the album, which included "Kiss from a Rose" (in English), "Sri Lanka" (instrumental), and an Arabic song.

In 2008, D'Or also released Shirat Rabim ("Prayers", or "Songs of the Many"—"A World Prayer; The Jewish Project of David D'Or and Patric Sabag"), a collection of prayers that he had originally heard from his father, and which he focused on when he started attending synagogue to say kaddish after his father's death. The album went gold in just three weeks. He also performed in all the 2008 WOMAD festival concerts, including in London with Peter Gabriel, the founder of the world music festival, and won the WOMAD "Favorite of the Audience" Award, though one reviewer wrote that "his reverb-drenched voice can sound bombastic, even when he is praying for peace. He is more successful when...in dance-pop". His performance of the song "Lecha D'odi" is featured on the compilation album Womad New Zealand 2008, which was released on June 2, 2008, by Shock Records. The year was capped when D'Or became an Israel Cultural Excellence Foundation ("IcExcellence") chosen artist in 2008, receiving one of Israel's highest recognitions for excellence in the arts.

In 2008 and 2009, D'Or performed in a series of "Voice of Love" charity concerts for the Tzu Chi Foundation in the United States (New York, San Francisco, San Jose, Pasadena, Los Angeles, Chicago, Dallas, New Jersey, and Washington, D.C.) and Asia (the Philippines and Taiwan), and recorded a CD and DVD by the same name, donating all of the profits to charity. The CD has since gone platinum. The foundation works to improve social and community services, medical care, education, and humanism in Taiwan and around the world. By helping others, D’Or said, the foundation, while Buddhist and not Jewish, is involved in the spirit of the Jewish concept of tikun olam, or "repairing the world". "We believe that all humanity is connected in a way", said D'Or.

D'Or sang a medley including "Amazing Grace" and a rendition of the traditional Hebrew melody "Avinu Malkeinu" at New York's Apollo Theater in Harlem on April 28, 2009, with three New York gospel choirs.

In May 2009 D'Or sang, along with Dudu Fisher and the "Arab-Jewish Girl's Choir", for Pope Benedict XVI in Jerusalem at the home of Israeli President Shimon Peres as the Pope visited Israel.

== Vocal style ==
D'Or's voice has a range (or "diapason") of more than four octaves. His vocal range in head voice is from G3 in scientific pitch notation, up to a well-defined G5 (as heard in one of the final notes in the "Phantom of the Opera" track in his album David D'Or and the Philharmonic), thus making him a "mezzo-soprano" type of countertenor.

D'Or's voice is unusually versatile and flexible, and notable for its unique tone and color, and for having a very recognizable sound. His voice is characterized by powerful fullness and richness, making it seem as though it is his natural singing voice, created without use of the falsetto technique. However, despite its richness his voice cannot be compared to the color of a contralto, unlike singers such as David Daniels, given that D'Or has a unique, male-sounding timbre. When he sings in modern fashion, he employs his speaking—or chest—voice, instead of his singing, alto voice. D'Or has been compared to Italian tenor Andrea Bocelli (but with a Middle Eastern flavor), and his voice has been described as having the smoothness of Jack Johnson overlaid with the falsetto style of Jeff Buckley.

== Performances ==
In addition to singing for two Popes, D'Or has also sung for Israeli President Shimon Peres, Italian President Giorgio Napolitano, King Bhumibol Adulyadej of Thailand, the King and Queen of Sweden at the Swedish Royal Palace in Stockholm, Nelson Mandela, Tony Blair, and Bill Clinton.

D’Or has performed with the Israel Philharmonic Orchestra, the Jerusalem Symphony Orchestra, the Rome Philharmonic, the London Symphony, the Vienna Philharmonic Orchestra, the Budapest Philharmonic, the China Philharmonic Orchestra, the Singapore Symphony Orchestra, the Belgrade Philharmonic Orchestra, the New York Symphony Orchestra, the Las Vegas Philharmonic Orchestra, and the Baltimore Symphony Orchestra.

D'Or has performed across the world, including in the United States, England, the Canary Islands, Sweden, Germany, Poland, Austria, Hungary, Serbia, Italy, Turkey, India, Thailand, Australia, China, Taiwan, Singapore, the Philippines, Morocco, and Israel. He sang before audiences of 55,000 people in Trafalgar Square in London, and 40,000 in Paris.

In 2025, an anti-Israel protestor splashed D'Or with red paint while he was singing a prayer for peace at the Festival of Jewish Culture in Warsaw.

== Pseudonym meaning ==
D'Or means "golden" or "of gold" in French, and in Francophone countries he is referred to as "golden David" or "David of gold".

== Discography ==
=== Albums ===
Year	Title	(English)	IFPI Israel Certification	Label
1992	David D'Or	"David D'Or"	Platinum	Hed Arzi
1993	Begovah Mishtaneh	"Changing Altitudes", or "Changing Heights"	Double Platinum	Hed Arzi
1995	David & Shlomo	"David and Salomon"	Platinum	Hed Arzi
1997	David D’Or & Etti Ankri	"David D’Or & Etti Ankri"	Double Platinum	Hed Arzi
2001	Baneshama	"In the Soul"	Platinum	SISU
2003	David D’Or VehaPhilharmonic	"David D’eor & the Philharmonic; Live Concert"	Platinum	Aviv
2004	Le Haamin	"To Believe"	Platinum	SISU
2006	Kmo HaRuach	"Like the Wind"	Gold	SISU
2007	Ofa'a Haia	"Live Concert"	Platinum	Hed Arzi
2007	Halelu—Shirim Shel David; Cantata LeShalom	"Halelu—Songs of David; Cantata for Peace"	—	Hed Arzi
2008	Shirat Rabim	"Prayers", or "Songs of the Many—A World Prayer"	Gold	Hed Arzi
2008	聽見愛的聲音	"Voice of Love"	Platinum	Da Jung Jang

== See also ==
- Music of Israel

Awards and achievements
Preceded by Lior Narkis with Words for Love	Israel in the Eurovision Song Contest; 2004	Succeeded by Shiri Maimon with Hasheket Shenish'ar
