= Dudu Fisher =

Israeli cantor and performer (born 1951)

David "Dudu" Fisher דודו פישר
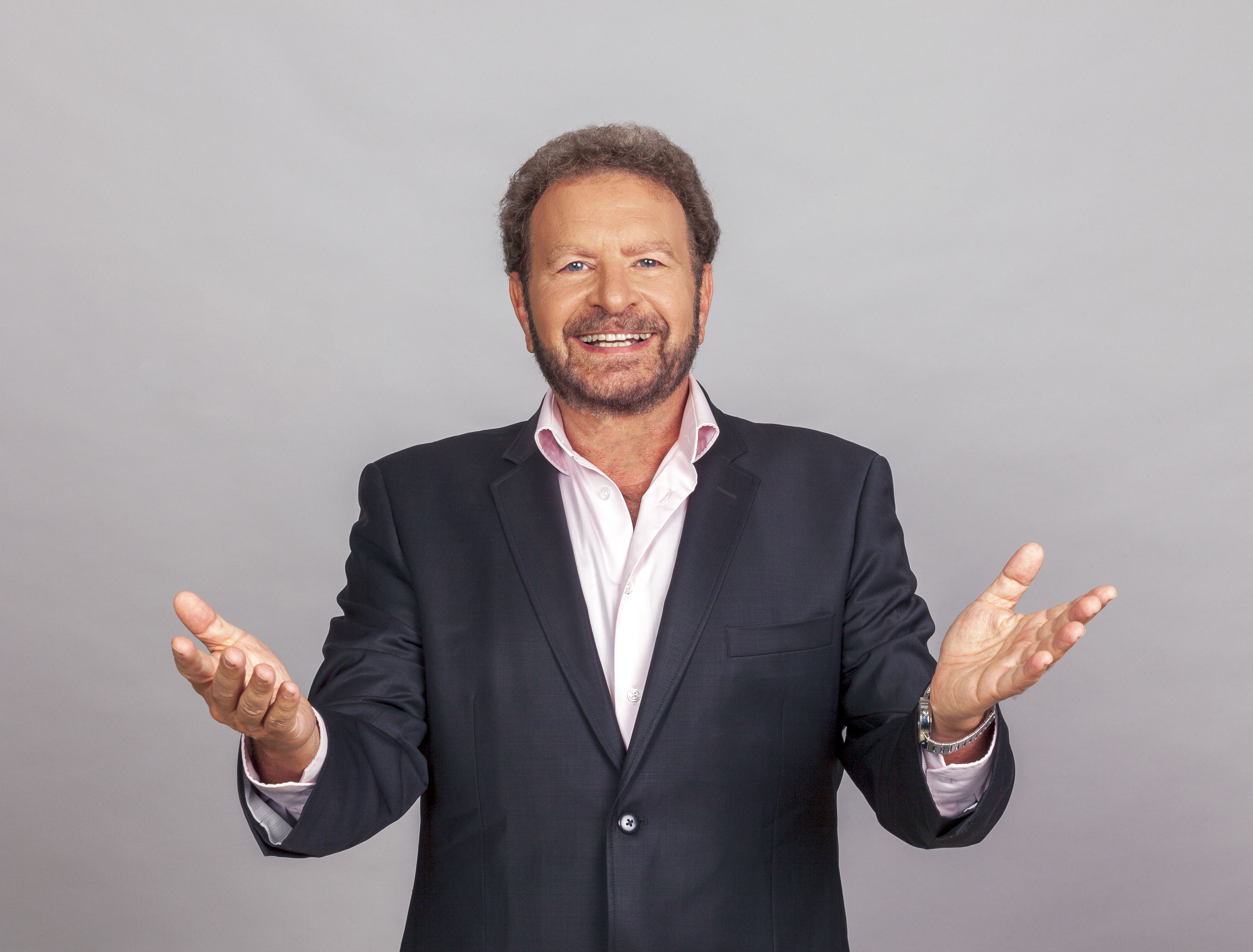
- Fisher in 2015

Background information
- Born: 18 November 1951 (age 74); Petah Tikva, Israel
- Origin: Israel
- Occupations: Cantor; Performer
- Years active: 1970–present
- Spouses: Tova Fisher (m. 1975; div. 2015) Rotel Elia (m. 2015; div. 2020) (m. 2024)
- Website: dudufisher.com

David "Dudu" Fisher (Hebrew: דודו פישר; born 18 November 1951) is an Israeli cantor and performer, best known for his Broadway performance as Jean Valjean in the musical Les Misérables.

== Biography ==
The son of a Holocaust survivor, Fisher was born in Petah Tikva, Israel. Fisher has three children from his first wife, Tova Fisher, and had a son from his second wife Rotel Elia in June 2016. Rotel is his promoter and his agent.

== Cantorial career ==
Fisher began cantorial studies at age 22, after his discharge from the army following three years of service that included the Yom Kippur War. He studied at the Tel Aviv Academy of Music, and studied privately under Cantor Shlomo Ravitz. He then took up the cantorial position at the Great Synagogue in Tel Aviv, followed by four years in South Africa. For over 20 years, he was the cantor at Kutsher's Hotel in the Catskills during the Jewish high holidays. In 2005, he became the Chief Cantor of the Hampton Synagogue in Westhampton Beach, New York and its now defunct subsidiary, the New York Synagogue in Manhattan.

== Les Misérables ==
After being mesmerised by the London performance of the 1980s hit musical, Fisher, despite having no prior acting experience, requested the part in a Hebrew production of Les Misérables. He played its leading role, Jean Valjean, in Israel from 1987-90. In 1988 he was invited to perform the role before Queen Elizabeth II. He played the role on New York City's Broadway during the winter of 1993-1994, and later at London's West End. At both venues, Fisher was the first performer excused from Friday night and Saturday performances, as he is an Orthodox Jew and was not able to perform because of the Sabbath.

== Other performance roles ==
Among Fisher's other performances is his one-man Off-Broadway show, Never on Friday, an anecdotal work exploring the complications of his experience on Broadway as an observant Jew. He performed in many tours around Israel, the United States, and the world, particularly in Jewish communities, performing classics, as well as musicals, such as Over the Rainbow which toured Israel with Fisher performing 40 Broadway show tunes. He performed with the Israel Philharmonic Orchestra, conducted by Zubin Mehta, with a performance televised in France, and with the Baltimore Symphony Orchestra and the Queens Symphony Orchestra. He has recorded an album of show tunes with the London Symphony Orchestra. He was the first Israeli artist allowed to sing in the Soviet Union before perestroika.

In May 2009, Fisher sang – along with contratenor David D'Or – for Pope Benedict XVI as the pope visited Israel.

In 1988, he was invited to London to take part in a Royal Command Performance hosted by the Queen of the United Kingdom. The performance was a special version of Les Misérables, featuring artists from the many productions playing around the world. From there, the play’s producer, Cameron Mackintosh, invited Fisher to play the role of Jean Valjean on Broadway and London's West End.

In December 2018, Fisher was subject to a stay of exit due to being involved in a bankruptcy proceeding. While this usually means that the subject is prohibited from leaving Israel, Fisher was permitted by the court to leave the country for two days in order to perform at a concert in Vienna. The waiver was given after he deposited ₪250,000 ($80,000) collateral with a special assets manager via a third party.

== Discography ==
In addition to his stage and synagogue performance, Fisher has released over 25 albums, including songs in Hebrew, Yiddish, and English, many classics and cantorial pieces, as well as music for children. He also dubbed the part of Moses in the Hebrew version of an animated film, The Prince of Egypt (1998).

- Beshem Hashem (In God's Name) (2008)
- Hatikvah (2005)
- Lehitei Yiddish Beivrit (Yiddish hits in Hebrew) (2005)
- Coming to America (2004)
- Prayers On Broadway (2003)
- Odecha (1999)
- Mamenyu (1997)
- L'tav Ulchayim V'lishlam (For Good, for Life and for Peace) (1997)
- Never on Friday (1996)
- Az Yashir David (1996)
- Showstoppers (1994)
- The Malavsky Family Songs (1993)
- Mamma Loshon (Mother Tongue) (1992)
- Velvet Tiger (1992)
- Golden Chasidic Song (1992)
- Gift (1992)
- Tonight, a Musical (1991)
- Stairways to Heaven (1990)
- Over the Rainbow (1989)
- Yiddishkeit (1988)
- Elokai Neshama (1985)
- Songs of My Heart (1983)
- Golden Yiddish Favorites (1985)
- Childhood Years (1985)
- Raisins and Almonds
- Songs of the Living
- Yiddishe Mamme
- Dudu Fisher's Kindergarten (DVD/VHS)

He also joined David D'Or, Eran Zur, and Meir Banai in the song "Lisa" on the album Radio Blah-Blah (1994) by the Israeli band The Friends of Natasha.

In 2009, Fisher recorded the song "Saleinu" for the organization Pioneers For A Cure, with the proceeds benefiting Ezer Mizion.

== See also ==
- List of Israeli actors
- List of Israeli musical artists
- List of Jewish musicians

== Sources ==
- "Bridge Between People – 'Dudu' Fisher to Bring Music to Warner Theatre", Dallas Jewish Week, 13 June 2002.
- Dudu Fisher, at GoldenLand.com; accessed 12 December 2005.
- "Golden Land Dudu Fisher", forward.com; accessed 12 January 2018.
