= Arkadi Duchin =

Israeli musical artist

Arkadi Duchin ארקדי דוכין
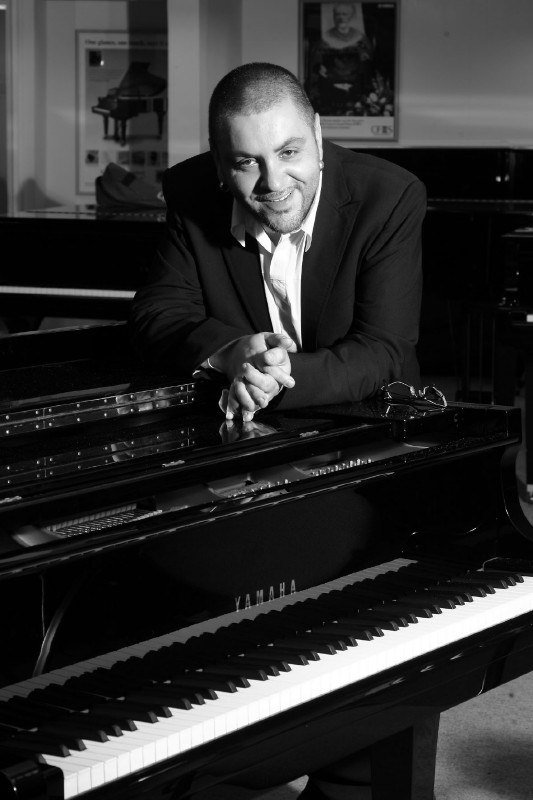

Background information
- Born: 1 June 1963 (age 63); Babruysk, Byelorussian SSR, Soviet Union (now Belarus)
- Genres: Rock, Pop
- Occupations: Singer-songwriter, musical producer
- Years active: 1980–present
- Labels: NMC, Hed Artzi, Helicon
- Member of: Ha-Chaverim shel Natasha
- Website: http://www.arkadi-music.com

Arkadi Duchin (Hebrew: ארקדי דוכין, Russian: Аркадий Духин, romanized: Arkadiy Dukhin; born 1 June 1963) is an Israeli singer-songwriter and musical producer.

== Music career ==
Duchin sang in the rock band HaChaverim Shel Natasha (The Friends of Natasha). The band, which he formed in 1986 with Micha Shitrit, made five albums, including the 1994 album Radio Blah Blah, before its breakup in 1996. Dudu Fisher, David D'Or, Eran Zur, and Meir Banai joined in the song "Lisa" on "Radio Blah-Blah".

After 9/11, Duchin and Etti Ankri, Zehava Ben, David D'Or, and other Israeli singers recorded the title song "Yesh Od Tikvah" ("Our Hope Endures"), for which D'Or wrote the music and lyrics, on the CD Yesh Od Tikvah/You've Got a Friend.

The CD, released by Hed Arzi in 2002, benefitted Israeli terror victims, with all proceeds going to "NATAL": the "Israel Trauma center for Victims of Terror and War".

In 2002, he was nominated for the Tamuz Award of Israel's Best Male Artist, along with David D'or, Shlomi Shabat, Yuval Gabay, and Yehuda Poliker, but lost out to D'Or.

Duchin sang a duet with David D'Or on D'Or's CD, Kmo HaRuach ("Like the Wind"), which was released on 27 March 2006.

In 2009, Duchin released a children's album, Friends of Arkasha.

== Personal life ==
He is married to Sima Levi and the father of two. He resides in Givatayim.

== See also ==
- Music of Israel
