= Yaniv d'Or =

Israeli opera singer

Yaniv d'Or יניב ד'אור
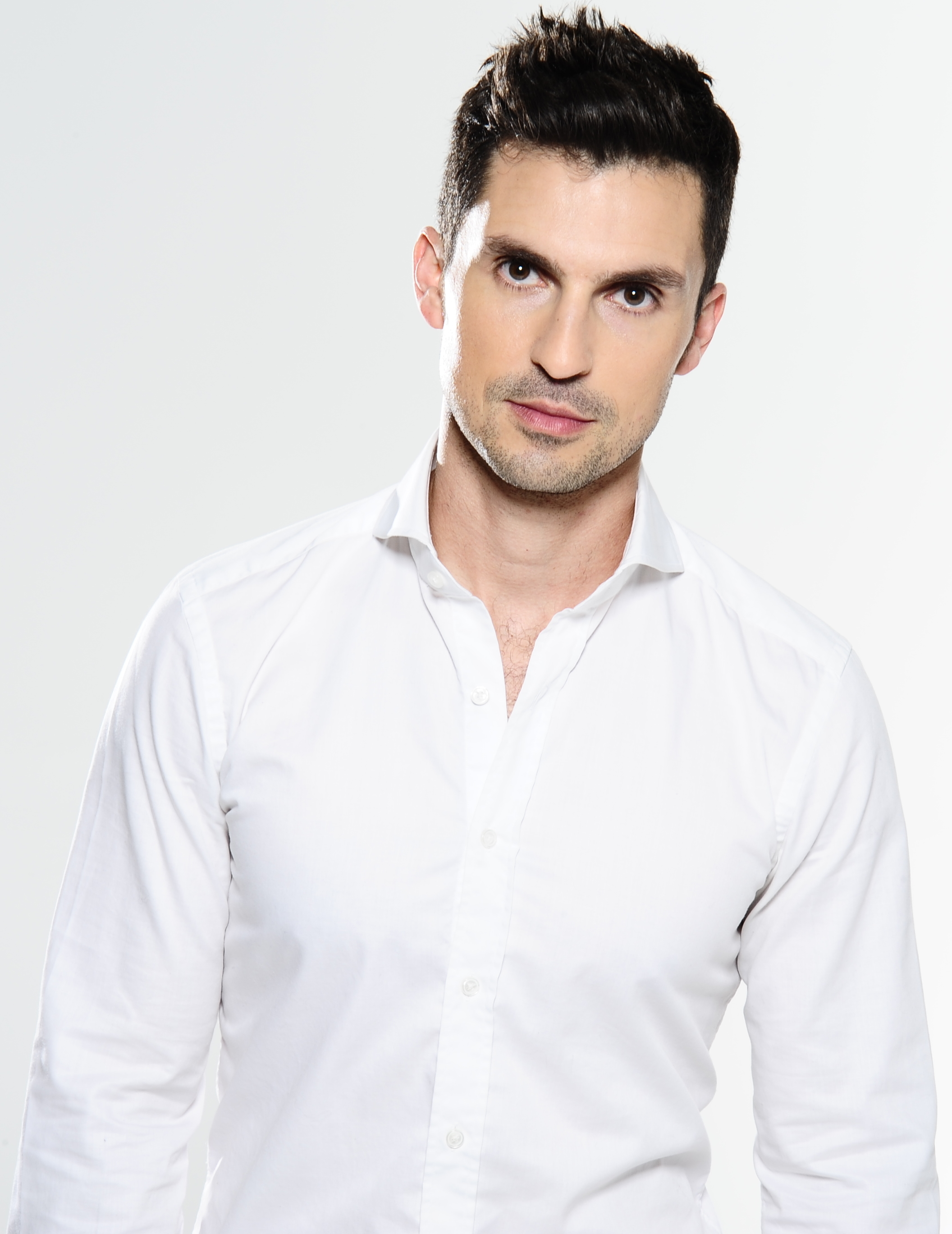
- Portrait of Yaniv d'Or

Background information
- Born: Yaniv Nehaisi; 11 March 1975 (age 51); Holon, Israel
- Genres: Classical crossover, folk, ladino, classical, opera, baroque
- Occupation: singer (countertenor)
- Instrument: Vocals
- Label: Naxos Records
- Website: http://www.yanivdor.com/

Yaniv d'Or (Hebrew: יניב ד'אור; born 11 March 1975) is an Israeli British countertenor. His main field is opera.

== Biography ==
Yaniv d'Or was born as Yaniv Nehaisi in Holon, Israel. His parents are from Maghrebi Jewish origin, with his grandparents coming from Libya. He studied at the Jerusalem Academy of Music and Dance and Guildhall School of Music and Drama in London. He performed in operas around the world, including Rome, Vilnius, Antwerp, St. Gallen, Ghent, Gothenburg, Wiesbaden and at the Queen Elizabeth Hall. D'Or performed for Queen Elisabeth II in Westminster Hall. He mostly sings baroque repertoire including oratorios, liturgicals, lieder and contemporary classical music. In recent years he has lived alternately in London and Tel Aviv and appears mainly in Europe and Israel. He is younger brother of Israeli singer David D'Or.

== Ensemble NAYA ==
Yaniv D'Or founded Ensemble NAYA in 2008.

== Repertoire ==
=== Opera ===
Composer	Title	Role
Monteverdi	L'incoronazione di Poppea	Ottone, Nerone
Purcell	Dido and Aeneas	Sorceress
Handel	Giulio Cesare	Tolomeo, Cesare
Handel	Xerxes	Arsamenes
Handel	Orlando	Medoro
Gluck	Orfeo ed Euridice	
Cavalli	L'Orione	
Ioseb Bardanashvili	Journey to the End of the Millennium	Rabbi Elbaz

== Discography ==
Title	Album details	Recording	Awards
Latino Ladino	Ensemble NAYA; Barrocade; Amit Tiefenbrunn, Conductor	Naxos Records	Top Ten albums by Gramophone
Exaltation	Ensemble NAYA	Naxos Records	
