= David Eaton (composer) =

American composer and conductor

David Eaton

David Eaton (born July 2, 1949, in Cleveland, Ohio) is an American composer and conductor who has been the music director of the New York City Symphony since 1985. He has also been an active composer and arranger, with 105 original compositions and over 900 arrangements and original songs to his credit. He has appeared as a guest conductor with orchestras in Asia, Canada, Israel, Europe, Central and South America, Russia, Ukraine and the United States. His compositions and arrangements have been performed at Carnegie Hall, Lincoln Center for the Performing Arts, the United Nations and by orchestras in the United States, Asia, Israel, South America and Europe. He also served at the conductor of the historic Goldman Band from 1998 to 2000 conducting the ensemble in concerts throughout the New York metropolitan area including performances at Lincoln Center for the Performing Arts. From 2018 to 2024 we was the principal conductor of the Hyo Jeong Youth Orchestra in South Korea. In 2022 he self-published his first book, What Music Tells Me: Beauty, Truth and Goodness and Our Cultural Inheritance.

== Early musical experience ==
He studied formally at the Cleveland Music School Settlement, Ohio State University, and at the Tanglewood Institute. He has attended conducting master classes with Seiji Ozawa, Roger Norrington, Gustav Meier, Zubin Mehta and Gunther Herbig. He composed his first symphony while a freshman at Ohio State University and has been an active composer and arranger for over five decades. During his time as a student he performed, composed and produced professionally in the northern Ohio area. In 1974 he became a member of the Unification Church and has worked in the performing arts department in the church since 1976, providing him extensive performing opportunities in New York, Los Angeles, Boston, and internationally. In 1976 he became a member of the New York City Symphony.

== Professional conducting career ==
Eaton began his professional conducting career in New York City in 1977, conducting the New York City Symphony Chamber Ensemble in a series of concerts in Manhattan, and has since led that ensemble in numerous concerts in New York City as well as a United States tour in 1995 that included performances in New York, Boston, Washington, D.C., Philadelphia, Los Angeles and San Francisco.

In addition to leading the New York City Symphony in its highly acclaimed Lincoln Center concert series at Alice Tully Hall, Eaton led the New York City Symphony and its Chamber Ensemble and Brass Choir in numerous concerts at Carnegie Hall, Lincoln Center's Avery Fisher Hall, the Manhattan Center, Merkin Hall, Harlem's Apollo Theater, the United Nations, Madison Square Garden and the Metropolitan Museum of Art.

He also served as conductor of the Goldman Band, and led that ensemble in its summer concert series in New York City from 1998 to 2000, including concerts at Lincoln Center, Brooklyn and Coney Island.

After his Carnegie Hall debut in 1989, the New York Daily News hailed the New York City Symphony as "one of America's finest orchestras." He later appeared with the NYC Symphony at Carnegie Hall on multiple occasions, including a concert during Carnegie Hall's Centennial Celebration.

In 1997 he led the NYCS Chamber Ensemble in a program at the United Nations during the U.N.'s 50th anniversary celebration honoring its non-governmental organizations. He has since returned to the U.N. on six subsequent occasions with the NYC Symphony Chamber Ensemble and orchestra, including a performance in 2015 at the General Assembly Hall of the U.N. as part of the U.N.'s 70th anniversary concert, as well as a performance celebrating the 80th anniversary of the founding of ECOSOC in 2026.

In 1988, he led the New York City Symphony on its first international tour. The tour included four concerts in Japan. and seven performances at the Olympic Arts Festival in Seoul, Korea. The orchestra's appearance at the Seoul Arts Center marked the first time that a Western orchestra had performed at that hall.

That same year Eaton and the NYC Symphony introduced New York audiences to the music of the Academy Award winning composer Tan Dun. The concert, presented at Lincoln Center's Avery Fisher Hall, featured four of Tan's works, including the world premieres of his Violin Concerto and Third Symphony.

He made his European conducting debut in 1989 with L'Orchestra Symphonique Français at the Flaine Summer Music Festival. In 1990 and 1991 he made two subsequent guest conducting appearances with that ensemble in Flaine and at the Salle Geveau in Paris. He also appeared as a guest conductor with the Ukrainian National Symphony Orchestra in a program of music by American composers at the Kyiv International Music Festival in 1991. He was subsequently invited to conduct an all-Mozart program with the Neri Symphony Orchestra of Moscow at the Great Hall of the Moscow Conservatory as part of the International Mozart Bicentennial Festival in Moscow.

Other guest conducting appearances include concerts with members of the Royal Philharmonic Orchestra Chamber Ensemble (UK), the Los Angeles Chamber Symphony, the Les Amis Chamber Ensemble of Toronto at the St. Lawrence Performing Arts Center, the Detroit Symphony Orchestra, the Taipei City Symphony Orchestra at the National Concert Hall in Taiwan, the Orquestra Sinfonica Nacional de Guatemala, the Suwon Symphony (Korea), the Asunción National Symphony Orchestra (Paraguay), the Goldman Band at Lincoln Center, the Hanoi Philharmonic, the Prime Philharmonic (Korea), the Metropolitan Repertory Ballet (NY) and the Chamber Players of the Americas at Carnegie Hall's Weill Recital Hall. In 2007 he returned to Korea to conduct the Camerata Chamber Orchestra at the World Culture and Sports Festival. His guest conducting appearance with David D'Or and the Hanoi Philharmonic at the Hanoi Opera House in 2013 was a part the 20th Anniversary celebration of diplomatic relations between Viet Nam and Israel. In 2013 he returned to Taiwan to conduct the Evergreen Symphony Orchestra at the National Concert Hall in Taipei.

He conducted the Belgrade Philharmonic in Serbia in the world premiere concert of Halelu---Songs of David in May 2007, a work that he co-composed with Israeli vocalist and composer David D'Or. In October 2007, he conducted a second performance of the Halelu cantata with the Sofia (Bulgaria) Philharmonic Orchestra and Chorus. In 2018 and 2019 he conducted concerts with the Western Symphony Orchestra featuring Britain's Got Talent award-winning vocalist, Paul Potts. In February 2020 he returned to South Korea conducted another program with Paul Potts and the Korean Modern Philharmonic Orchestra.

In 2007 he was featured conductor/arranger in the "Three Sopranos Peace Concert" presented in Asunción, Paraguay. On September 9, 2011, he conducted the NYC Symphony at the General Assembly of the United Nations as part of the UN's 10th Anniversary Commemorative Program honoring the victims of the 9/11 attacks. The program included excerpts of the Halelu cantata and his "Hope of All Ages" music. He conducted the NYC Symphony Chamber Ensemble in a return performance at the United Nations in February 2012 at the closing ceremony of the U.N.'s Interfaith Conference.

In 2017 Mr. Eaton was invited to conduct three movements of the Halelu peace cantata with the Vienna Youth Chamber Ensemble as part of a benefit concert for Syrian refugees at the Syrian Orthodox Church in Vienna, Austria.

== Music for Peace ==
A committed advocate for peace and interreligious reconciliation, Eaton has traveled to the Middle East on numerous occasions since 2003 to produce concerts and conferences in association with the Middle East Peace Initiative (MEPI). He has also written articles and appeared at speaking engagements (including at the United Nations) promoting the utilization of art and music in the effort of creating an atmosphere conducive to inter-cultural and inter-religious harmony.

It was at the MEPI Peace Concert in Jerusalem in 2004 that he first met the renowned Israeli singer-composer David D'Or, which resulted in a collaboration that led to the creation of the Cantata for Peace, Halelu—Songs of David.

His professional relationship with Japanese soprano Seiko Lee has resulted in numerous concerts, musical arrangements, and recordings that advocate the ideals of peace and reconciliation. Both are charter members of Artists Association for World Peace (AAWP), an organization that encourages artists to use their creative abilities in the most humanitarian and altruistic fashion. He has also co-produced peace-related concerts and conferences in Asia, South America, and Europe.

In addition, he is the President and co-founder of the Peace Music Foundation, a non-profit organization that has sponsored an international peace-song writing contest and various peace-related cultural activities. He was the producer of the CD, Songs for Peace, that features the winning entries of the inaugural PMF peace-song competition in 2005. He also co-produced the "Heart to Heart" CD (2004) for MEPI and the Peace Song Competition CD, "Peace Is In Our Hands", for the Universal Peace Federation in 2006. In 2020 and 2021 he conducted several concerts in Korea as part of the North-South Korea peace initiative sponsored by the Universal Peace Federation.

In 2007 he was awarded an honorary doctorate degree from the Universidad Metropolitana de Asunción (Paraguay) in recognition of his efforts to promote peace through the art of music. In 2016 he received a second honorary doctorate from the Unification Theological Seminary in New York.

== Composing and arranging ==
In addition to his conducting career, Eaton has been a prolific composer, arranger, and producer with 105 original compositions and more than 900 songs, transcriptions and arrangements to his credit. In 1986 he was the lead orchestrator for the Universal Ballet Company's production of Shim Chung, The Blindman's Daughter (music by Kevin Pickard), which won the award for best entry in the Seoul Olympic Arts Festival.

Two of his compositions, Fantasie for Violin, Cello, Piano and Strings and Three Miniatures for Chamber Orchestra, were performed at Carnegie Hall by the New York City Symphony under his direction. His symphonic band work, Melavations, was premiered by the Goldman Memorial Band at Lincoln Center as part of that ensemble's 2000 summer concert season. Another recent composition, Morning's Calm for Soprano and Chamber Orchestra, was premiered at the United Nations in 2001 as part of the International World Peace Assembly. His recent orchestral work, 70 and Counting Op. 54, is a tribute commemorating the 70th Anniversary of the founding of the United Nations, and conducted the premiere of that composition at the U.N. on June 30, 2015. He conducted the premiere performance of his composition for chorus and orchestra, Sing Praise, Hallelujah! in South Korea in 2016.

His orchestral settings of Sephardic folk songs, The Alhambra Suite, was commissioned for the Second Assembly of the World's Religions in 1985. The suite received additional performances by the Los Angeles Jewish Symphony and a subsequent performance at the Pittsburgh Jewish Music Festival in 2005.

In observance of the first anniversary of the tragedy of September 11, 2001, he was commissioned to write music for the Interreligious and International Federation for World Peace Conference in New York in September 2002. The resulting music, The Hope of All Ages, featured narrated texts by world leaders in the realms of religion, diplomacy and human rights. The composition received a second performance at New York's Lincoln Center in September 2005 at the inaugural ceremony for the Universal Peace Federation.

Another major composing project, the Cantata for Peace, Halelu—Songs of David, was a collaboration with prominent Israeli vocalist David D'Or. The debut recording of Halelu was recorded in Tel Aviv, Israel in 2006 with the Ra'anana Symphony Orchestra and the Philharmonia Chorus of Israel. Halelu received its world premiere performance in Belgrade, Serbia, under his direction on May 19, 2007, with Mr. D'Or and soprano Seiko Lee as the soloists with the Belgrade Philharmonic and the 120-voice choir of the Academic Cultural Artistic Society. The concert was held at the Sava Arts Center in Belgrade and was televised to six other Eastern European countries. He conducted a second performance of Halelu in Sofia, Bulgaria with David D'Or, Miss Lee, and the Sofia Philharmonic Orchestra and Chorus on October 8, 2007.

In 2008 and 2009, excerpts of the Halelu Cantata were choreographed and presented at the European Dance and Arts-Salzburg (EDAS) in Cyprus (choreography by Lyn C. Wiltshire, artistic director for EDAS Cyprus and associate professor at the University of Texas at Austin and Cristina Uta of the Salzburg Ballet), and by the Kashet Chaim Dance Ensemble of Los Angeles. His arrangement of Israeli vocalist David D'Or's How Much You Love was performed by Mr. D'Or and the Israel Philharmonic in June 2010 in Cesarea, Israel. His Hip-Hop/Classical composition, Kenny's Joy, was featured on the History Channel's Stan Lee's Super Humans in 2010, which featured vocal percussionist, Kenny Mohammad. The piece was also performed by the Kokolo String Ensemble in 2011 at the Brooklyn Museum of Art. He has conducted excerpts of the Halelu cantata in New York, Vienna, Vietnam, South Korea, Israel and at the United Nations on two occasions.

He conducted members of the Royal Philharmonic Orchestra in an excerpt from his The Hope of All Ages at the Global Peace Festival in London in 2008. Another current composition project is Juxtapositions: Suite for Electric Viola and Orchestra which he was requested to compose by Alexander Mishnaevski, principal violist of the Detroit Symphony Orchestra. Two movements of the suite were performed by the Detroit Symphony Orchestra in March 2011 and excerpts of the piece were performed at the Lexington (MI) Bach Festival in September, 2011. Juxapositions received a second performance by the Detroit Symphony under Mr. Eaton's direction in 2012. In 2014 members of the New York City Symphony appeared on NBC's Saturday Night Live with the Grammy Award-winning group, Imagine Dragons. In 2016 his composition for chorus and orchestra, Sing Praise, Hallelujah was performed under his direction in South Korea in 2016 and 2018.

Additionally, his composition for three sopranos, violin and piano, River Angels, Op. 64, was premiered in Seoul, Korea in 2018. His composition, Onward and Upward for large orchestra was premiered in August 2019 by the Western Symphony Orchestra and was featured in a peace rally in Johannesburg, South Africa that same year. His hymn for children's chorus and orchestra, In the Garden, Op. 63, was premiered by the Little Angels of Korea in 2019 with the Korean Modern Philharmonic Orchestra.

As an arranger/conductor/producer he has worked with a wide array of artists including Jennifer Holliday, Philip Michael Thomas, Paul Potts, Richard Bona and Paul Sorvino. In the recording studio he has produced numerous tracks utilizing MIDI sequencing synthesizers as well as conventional instrumentation. From 1991 to 1995 he served as a house producer and arranger at the Manhattan Center in New York, arranging and producing scores of songs for a wide array of artists including Columbia/Sony jazz artist Richard Bona. In 2013 he arranged music for New York State's "New York's Rising Communities" television ad campaign.

== Compositions ==
- The Three Hearts of God, Ballet Suite, Op. 28 (1983/Revised 2016)
- Alhambra Suite, Op. 29 (1985/Revised 2019)
- Fantasie for Violin, Cello, Piano and Orchestra, Op. 30 (1990)
- Berceuse: Gerin's Song, for Chamber Orchestra, Op. 31 (1991)
- Mystic Essay, Op. 32 for Piano and Synthesizer, (1993)
- Kenny's Joy for Strings and Vocal Percussion, Op. 34 (1998/Revised 2014)
- Melavations for Concert Band, Op. 35 (2000)
- Morning's Calm, Concert Aria for Soprano and Chamber Orchestra, Op. 36 (2001)
- The Hope of All Ages for Narrators, Strings and Harp, Op. 37 (2002)
- We Shall Live in Peace, Op. 38 Hymn for the Interreligious Peace Sports Festival (2003)
- Halelu—Songs of David, Cantata for Peace, Op. 40 (2005---with David D'Or)
- Prelude and Meditation, for Chamber Orchestra, Op. 39a (2008)
- Le Pace L'esperanza, Concert Aria for Tenor and Orchestra, Op. 41 (2009)
- Juxtapositions: Suite for Electric Viola and Orchestra, Op. 42 (2010)
- Pavane for Orchestra, Op. 42a (2010)
- Heavenly Mother, Concert Aria for Soprano and Orchestra, Op. 43 (2011)
- Holy Songs, 15 Hymns arranged for Chamber Orchestra, Op. 44 (2011)
- Diversions for Three, for 2 Violas and Piano, Op. 45 (2011)
- Variations on a Theme by Carl Nielsen, for Orchestra, Op. 46 (In Progress)
- Sonic Waltz, for String Quartet, Op. 47 (2011)
- Angelic Vibes, Concerto for Harp and Chamber Orchestra, Op. 49 (2013)
- Divertimento for Strings, Op. 51 (2014)
- Divertimento for Strings and Harp, Op. 51a (2014)
- White Prelude and Blue Scherzo for Orchestra, Op. 52 (2014)
- 70 and Counting for Orchestra, Op. 54, Fanfare for the United Nations' 70th Anniversary (2015)
- String Theory, Concerto for Solo Violin, Strings and Harp, Op. 55 (2016)
- Sing Praise, Hallelujah, Hymn for Chorus and Orchestra, Op. 57 (2016)
- Afterthoughts, Op. 56, Elegy for Chamber Orchestra (2016)
- Prelude and Dansé, Poem Chorégraphie Op. 59 for Orchestra and Jazz/Rock Fusion Ensemble (2017)
- River Variations for Piano and Orchestra, Op. 60 (2019-2020 in progress)
- Modalities, Five Episodes for Solo Flute, Harp, Vibraphone and Strings, Op. 61 (2017)
- Cylindriconics, Concert Music for Brass, Timpani and Percussion, Op. 62 (2018)
- In the Garden, Hymn for Children's Chorus and Orchestra, Op. 63 (2018)
- River Angels, Music for Three Sopranos, Violin and Piano, Op. 64 (2018)
- Euro Anthem, for Chorus and Chamber Orchestra, Op. 65 (2018)
- The Dream of True Love, Concert Aria for Tenor and Orchestra, Op. 67 (2018)
- Triumph 2020 for Orchestra, Op. 68 (2019)
- Onward and Upward, for Orchestra, Op. 69 (2019)
- Fanfare: The Grand Entrance, for Orchestra, Op. 70 (2019)
- Martial Arts March, for Orchestra, Op. 71 (2020)
- Berceuse, for Clarinet, String Trio and Piano, Op. 72 (2020)
- Flourish for Orchestra, Op. 73 (2020)
- Three Hymns of Ascension, for Solo Voices and Orchestra, Op. 74 (2020)
- Liturgical Songs for Chorus and Orchestra, Op. 75 (2020)
- Omaya Variations, for Orchestra, Op. 76 (2020)
- Fusion Fantasie No. 1 for Chamber Orchestra, Vibraphone and Harp, Op. 77 (2020)
- Chamber Trilogy for Flute, Violin and Piano, Op. 78 (2021 in progress)
- Fusion Fantasie No. 2 for Flute, Violin and Piano, Op. 79 (2021 in progress)
- Hyo Jeong March, for Orchestra, Op. 80 (2021)
- Ten Celebratory Fanfares, for Orchestra, Op. 81 (2021)
- Ascension Music for Orchestra, Op. 82 (2021)
- It Takes Two, Tresillo for Violin, Guitar, Accordion and Contrabass, Op. 83 (2021)
- It's Tresillo Time. for Orchestra, Op, 83a (2021)
- Habanera, for Violin, Guitar, Accordion and Contrabass, Op. 84 (2021)
- Dance Suite No. 1, for Chamber Orchestra, Op. 85 (2021)
- Dance Suite No. 2, for Chamber Orchestra, Op. 86 (2021)
- Hong Ik In Gan (We Are Humanitarians), Peace Anthem for Chorus and Orchestra, Op. 87 (2022)
- Spring Music, for Chamber Orchestra, Op. 88 (2022)
- March: Towards a Peaceful World, for Orchestra, Op. 89 (2022)
- Serene Serenade, for Chamber Orchestra, Op. 90 (2022)
- Unbelievable Nature, Dance music for Chamber Orchestra, Op. 91 (2022)
- Autumn Sky, for Solo Voice and Chamber Orchestra, Op. 92 (2022)
- Martial Arts Music, No. 1, for Orchestra, Op. 93 (2022)
- Heaven's Glory, Hymn for Chorus and Orchestra, Op. 94 (2022)
- Palace Dance, for Chamber Orchestra, Op. 95 (2023)
- Palace Processional for Orchestra, Op. 96 (2023)
- Three Seasonal Songs for Solo Voice and Orchestra, Op. 97 (2023)
- Out of Darkness, Into the Noon Day Sun, Dance music for Orchestra, Op. 98 (2023)
- Juxtapositions II, Suite for Orchestra, Op. 99 (2023)
- Korean Folk Song Suite, for Chamber Orchestra, Op. 100 (2023)
- Hymn: Rejoice in Love, for Chorus and Orchestra, Op. 101 (2024)
- Hymn: Here at Heaven's Gate, for Soprano, Strings and Harp, Op. 102 (2025)
- Hymn: Sing Songs of Love for Chorus and Orchestra, Op. 103 (2025)
- Celebration Fanfare, for Orchestra, Op. 104 (2025)
- World Fanfare, for Brass and Organ, Op. 105 (2026)

== Discography ==
- If Love Is The Answer, Pop songs, Producer, composer, pianist and arranger (1993)
- Cool Revolution, for Laleh Nader, Arranger and co-producer (2003)
- Heart to Heart: Music From the Middle East Peace Initiative, Producer and composer (2004)
- Liberation: Songs of My Spiritual Country, Orchestrator and arranger for soprano Seiko Lee (2005)
- Songs for Peace, Co-executive producer for Peace Music CommUNITY (2006)
- Halelu: Songs of David, Op. 40, R'ananna Symphony Orchestra (Israel), Co-producer, composer and conductor (2006)
- Peace Is In Our Hands, Producer and composer (2007)
- Halelu: Songs of David, Op. 40, Belgrade Symphony Orchestra & Academic Chorus—Live Recording, Composer and conductor (2008)
- Holy Songs, 15 Hymns for Chamber Orchestra, Producer and arranger (2011)
- Harmony, Music from Asia and the West, Composer and co-producer (2017)
- New Songs of Filial Heart, Volume I, Co-producer and arranger (2017)
- New Songs of Filial Heart, Volume II, Co-producer and arranger (2018)
- Some of My Music, Volume I, composer, Conductor and producer (2019)
- New Songs of Filial Heart, Volume III, Co-producer and arranger (2019)
- New Songs of Filial Heart, Volume IV, Co-producer and arranger (2020)
- 12 Songs for Filial Children, Volume I, Composer, co-producer (2020)
- Some of My Music, Volume II, Composer and producer (2020)
- New Songs of Filial Heart, Volume V, Co-producer and arranger (2021)
- Some of My Music, Volume III, Composer and producer (2021)
- New Songs of Filial Heart, Volume VI, producer, arranger, composer (2022)
- Some of My Music, Volume IV, Composer and producer (2022)
- 12 Songs for Filial Children, Volume II, Composer and arranger (2022)
- Some of My Music, Volume V, Composer and producer (2022)
- Some of My Music, Volume VI, Composer and producer (2023)
- Some of My Music, Volume VII, Composer and producer (2023)
- Some of My Music, Volume VIII, Composer and producer (2023)
- Some of My Music, Volume IX, Composer and producer (2024)
- Peace Starts With Me/The Sound of Heavenly Culture, Composer, arranger and co-producer (2025)
- Some of My Music, Volume X, Composer and producer (2026)
- Celebratory Music: 2016-2024, Composer and producer (2026)
- East Meets West, Composer and producer with lyricist Ahan Woo (2026)
