= Ron Shoval =

Israeli singer (born 1973)

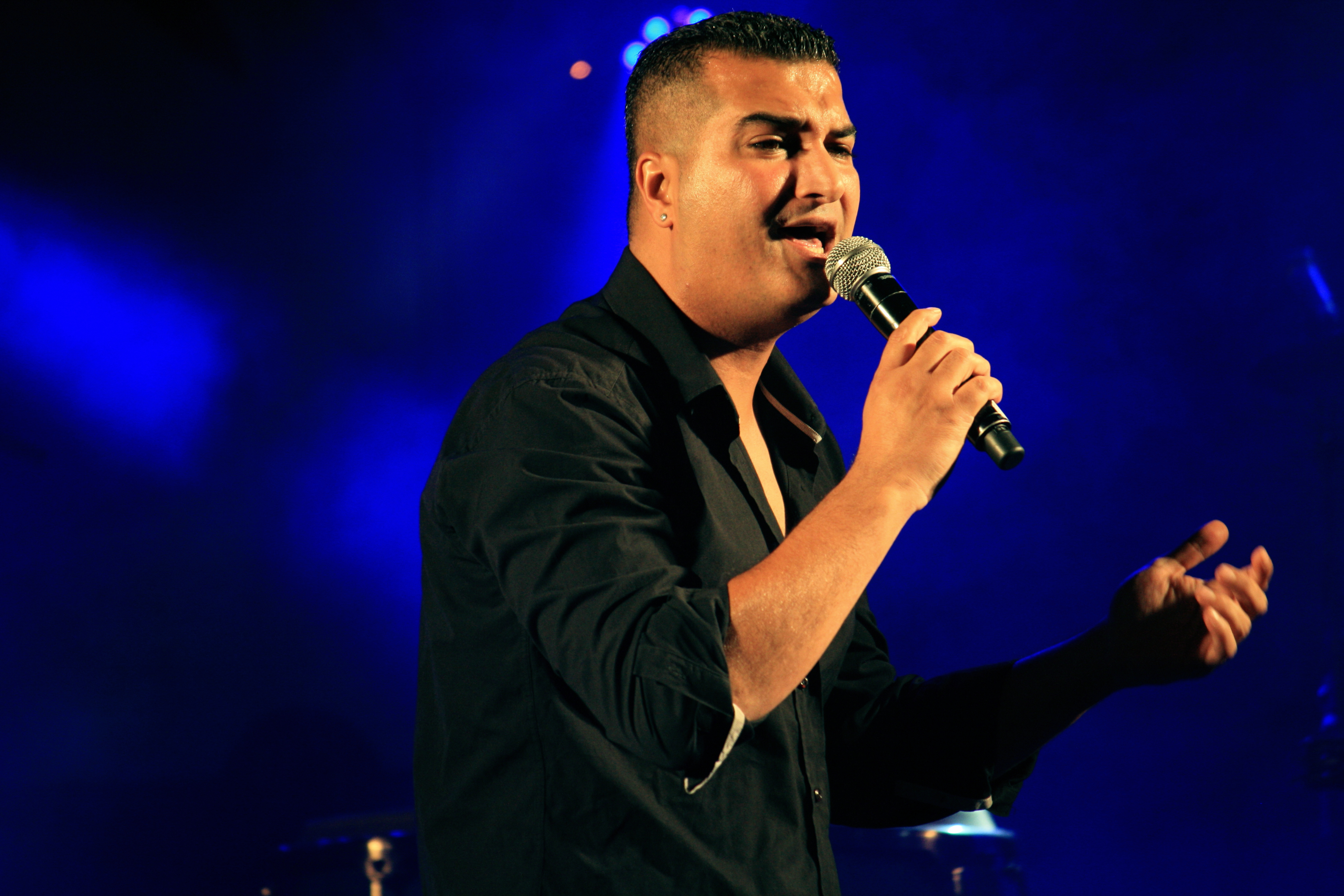

Ron Shoval (Hebrew: רון שובל; born 4 September 1973) is an Israeli singer.

== Early life ==
Shoval Ron Mobley was born, grew up, and was educated in Tel Aviv, Israel to a family of Yemenite-Jewish descent. He is the fifth of six brothers. From an early age he was interested in singing and music.

== Music career ==
His first album "Youth" was published in 1986 when he was only 13. The music was composed by Arkadi Duchin. In addition, the album renovation performed by Boaz Sharabi singing "Pamela" duet with Sharabi.

His second album "no longer a child" came two years later, however it was not as successful. Newspapers stated that "the child went and went well enough." His fourth album "part of my body," released in 1998, became a success thanks to hits like "part of my body" "Just Ahbini 'and' How can".

In 2000, he released the double album "Moving In", which contained mostly old songs. In 2001, he released "Turns Me." In 2002, he released the album "Light and Shadow", and performed the song "I Can".

In 2003, he released the studio album "Michaela", which included a successful performance of Gidi Gov's poem "Not a Day." In 2004, he released the album "Heart perceived," which included the song "I will not forget" and a version of the song "You and I" by Shlomo Artzi. It carried along with Yael Bar Zohar processing Elkayam month of holidays, for Tu B'Av. That year he also participated in a duet with oak Olearchick Festival Songs of Israel. "Duet," there will be peace "written and composed by And composed by Olearchick came in third in the competition.

In 2008, he released the album "in my heart," which won relative success. In 2009 he issued the single "terrific night."

In 2012, he was broadcast on Channel HOT3 documentary series - Reality "Golstar". At the end of 2012, the album "terrific night" which was a success.

== Personal life ==
Shoval is married, with one child.

== Discography ==
- Youth - 1986 - נעורים
- Feel the way - 1988 - מרגיש בדרך
- No longer a child - 1990 - כבר לא ילד
- Part of my body - 1998 - חלק מגופו
- Two passes - a double album - 2000 - עובר בשניים - אלבום כפול
- Turns Me - 2001 - מסובבת אותי
- Michaela - 2003 - מיכאלה
- Perceived heart - 2004 - נתפס בלב
- In my heart - 2008 - בחדרי ליבי
- Crazy Night - 2012 - לילה משוגע
