= Lior Narkis =

Israeli singer (born 1976)

Lior Narkis ליאור נרקיס
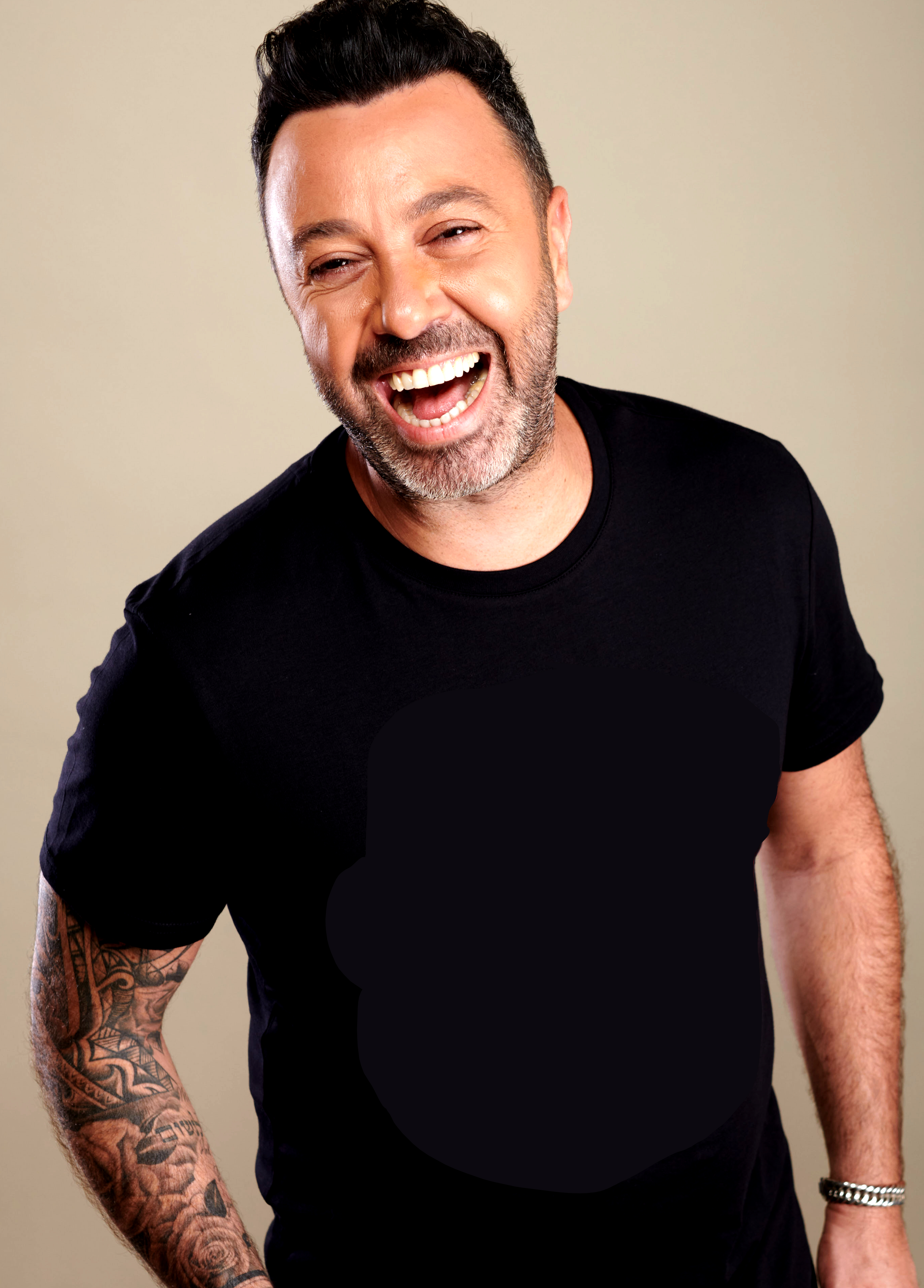

Background information
- Born: Lior Narkis; November 8, 1976 (age 49); Holon, Israel
- Genres: Mizrahi, pop
- Occupation: Musician
- Instrument: Vocals
- Years active: 1992–present
- Website: lior-narkis.com

Lior Narkis (Hebrew: ליאור נרקיס; born November 8, 1976, in Holon, Israel) is an Israeli singer.

== Biography ==
Lior Narkis was born in Holon. His father, David Narkis, was of Babylonian Jewish origin. His mother Hanna Narkis, was of Serbian-Jewish descent and also had Greek-Tunisian-Jewish ancestry. Narkis speaks Hebrew, Serbian and French. He is married to Sapir Vanunu, who is thirteen years his junior. They have two sons and a daughter, and live in Savyon.

== Music career ==
Narkis dreamed of becoming a singer since childhood. He released his first album, Tfilat Chayay (The Prayer of My Life) at the age of 16. A few years later during his military service in the Israel Defense Forces (IDF), Narkis joined Tamir Tzur to form the first Mediterranean musical group.

His sixth album, Rak Itakh (Only with You), which includes the hit "Lekol Echad Yesh" (Everyone Has), placed Narkis at the center stage of Israeli music. This song was also chosen as the "Song of the Year" in Israel, and was very popular among football (soccer) fans. In 2001, Narkis released his album Ze Mehalev (Straight from the Heart). As with his previous albums, this was a great success and many of its songs became hits.

In 2003, the song "Words for Love" (Hebrew: "Milim La'Ahava" Hebrew script מילים לאהבה) won at the national finals organized by the Israeli Broadcasting Authority ("IBA") television channel, Channel One, against three other songs for the right to represent Israel in the Eurovision Song Contest 2003, The song ended up 19th out of the 26 Eurovision finalists.

At the age of 26, Narkis released his eighth album Milim La'Ahava (Words for Love), named after his Eurovision entry.

Narkis performed at the Opening Ceremonies of the 2017 Maccabiah Games on July 6, 2017.

== Discography ==
=== Albums ===
- Prayer of My Life (1994)
- The World Is Like a Wheel (1995)
- You Are the Star (1997)
- Signs (1998)
- Life for Love (1999)
- Only with You (2000)
- This is From the Heart (2001)
- Words of Love (2003)
- Street Cat (2005)
- Words you Didn't Say (2006)
- Sleepy (2008)
- Good Evening (2010)
- If You Want (2012)
- Diamond (2014)
- We Made History (2016)

=== Singles ===
- "Lekol Echad Yesh" (Everyone Has)
- 2003: "Words for Love" (Hebrew: "Milim La'Ahava" Hebrew script מילים לאהבה)

== See also ==
- Mizrahi Music

Awards and achievements
Preceded by Sarit Hadad with Light A Candle	Israel in the Eurovision Song Contest; 2003	Succeeded by David D'Or with Leha'amin
