= Smadar Levi =

Israeli singer

Smadar Levi (Hebrew: סמדר לוי) is an Israeli singer.

Levi was born in Sderot Israel to a family that had immigrated from Morocco and Tunisia. She has dedicated her career to reviving and reinvigorating the spirit of Convivencia, coexistence between Jewish and Muslim cultures. World Music calls Levi, "perhaps the most exciting voice in the burgeoning Mediterranean New York City world music scene." Levi sings in Hebrew, Arabic, and Ladino. Her music has been described as “pan-Mediterranean music peppered with a gypsy sound.”

Seeds of Peace has honored Levi for "uniting cultures to achieve peace through music."
