= Merav Miller =

Israeli news presenter and broadcaster (born 1971)

- מירב מילר
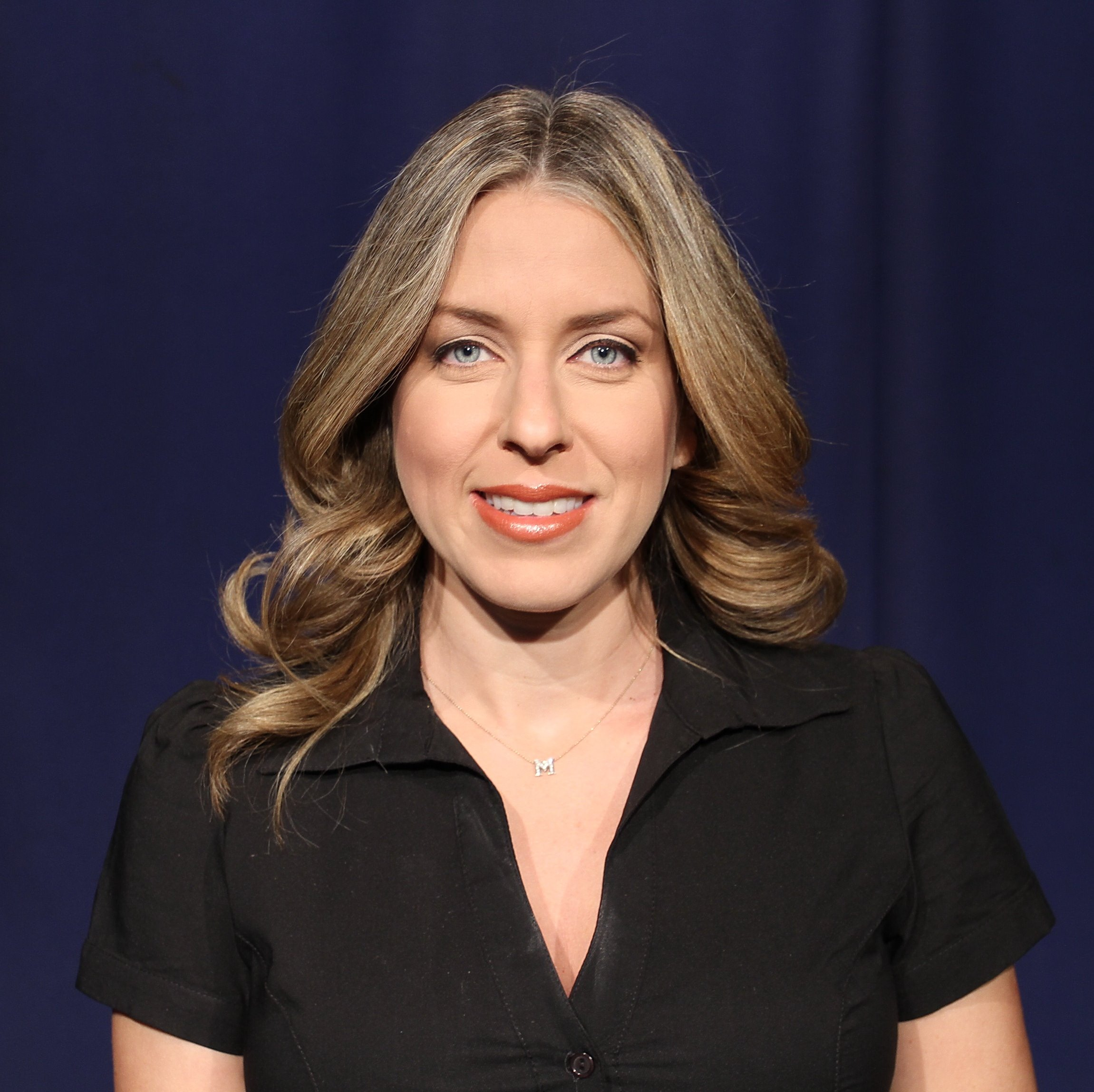
- Born: 21 May 1971 (age 55); Kfar Saba
- Presenting career
- Show: News Anchor
- Station: Arutz Ahat
- Network: Israel Broadcasting Authority
- Time slot: Prime time
- Country: Israel
- Previous show: Kdam Eurovision 2004

Merav Miller (Hebrew: מירב מילר; born May 21, 1971) is an Israeli news presenter and broadcaster.

Miller was born and raised in Kfar Saba, served in the Israeli Air Force, then worked as a flight attendant and studied communications at a college. She began her career as a reporter at Hot, a cable television service provider, and then moved to work at Israel Broadcasting Authority. She was the host for Kdam Eurovision, the Israeli national selection show for the Eurovision Song Contest, in 2004.

Miller began to anchor the prime time evening news show at Arutz Ahat in 2008. In the same year, she directed and presented the documentary The Victory of Tomer Bouhadana, the story of an Israeli soldier - injured in the 2006 Lebanon War - who is determined to recover and participate in the triathlon event again. She also appeared on the satire show Matzav Ha'Uma on 22 September 2014, in the episode The Year in Review.
