= Hasidic New Wave =

American experimental klezmer music group

Hasidic New Wave is an American experimental klezmer music group. Its members, all of whom were improvisational jazz musicians from downtown Manhattan, formed for the purpose of fusing Hasidic musical styles (such as the Hora and Nigun) with elements of jazz and avant-garde rock. Trumpet player Frank London (also a member of The Klezmatics) sees Hasidic New Wave as evidence that Yiddish culture continues to thrive in the 21st century.

Greg Wall and Frank London originally met at the New England Conservatory of Music (where they both studied jazz) and reconnected in New York, when they both begun learning Hasidic music to play wedding gigs supporting themselves. A lot of that music made its way into Hasidic New Wave recordings.

Hasidic New Wave released a retrospective 5-CD boxset on Tzadik Records in late 2012.

Previously, the band has recorded 5 CDs, including four on Knitting Factory's Jewish Alternative Movement label.

== Discography ==
- 1996 - Jews and the Abstract Truth (Knitting Factory Works KFW 192)
- 1998 - Psycho-Semitic (Knitting Factory Records KFR 203)
- 1999 - Kabalogy (Knitting Factory Records KFR 239)
- 2000 - Live in Kraków (Not Two Records MW 706–2)
- 2001 - From the Belly of Abraham (with Yakar Rhythms) (Knitting Factory Records KFW 294)
