= Ezer Mizion =

Israeli health organization

- עזר מציון
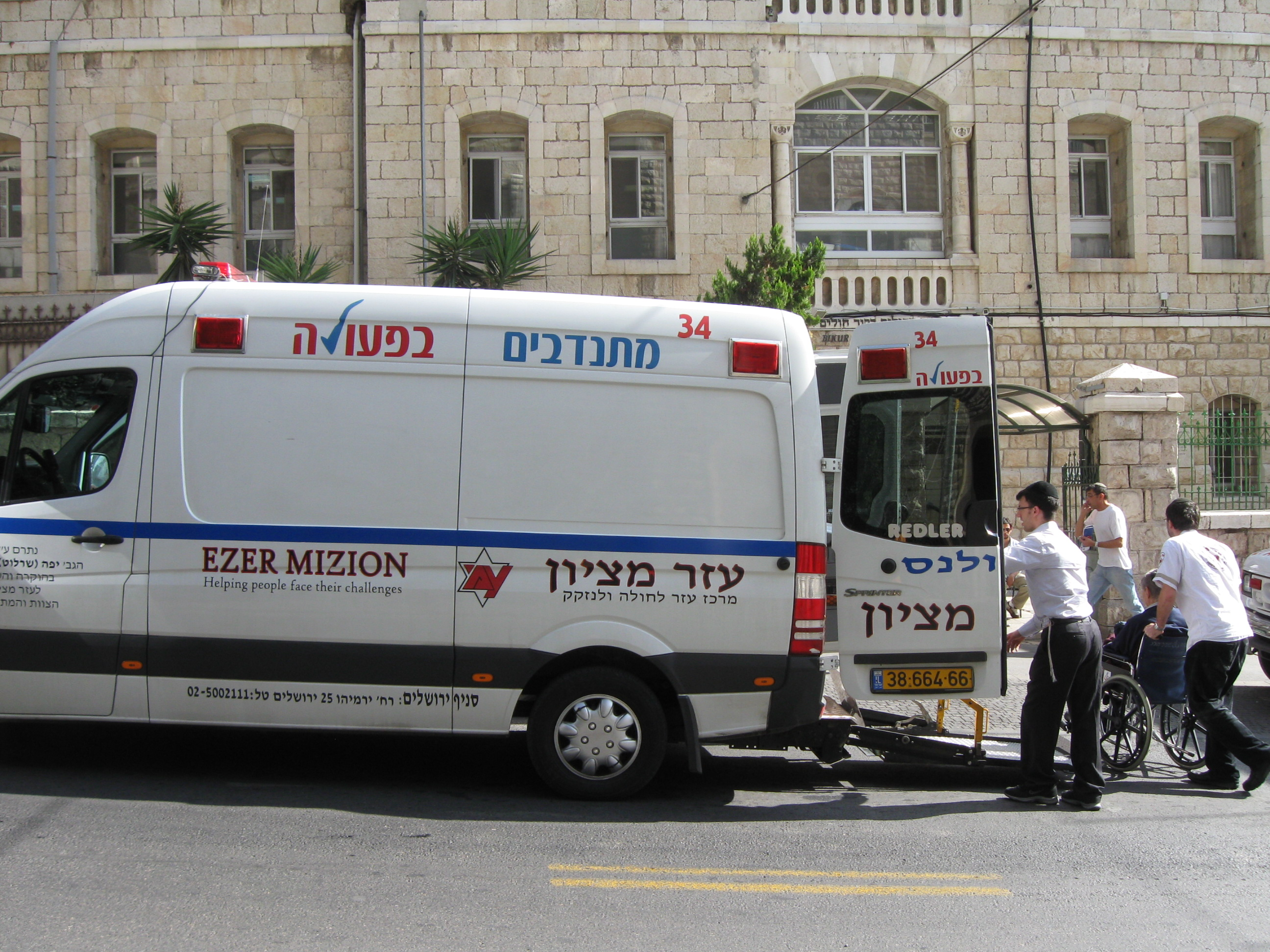
- An Ezer Mizion ambulance delivers a wheelchair-using patient to his medical check-up at Bikur Cholim Hospital, Jerusalem.
- Formation: 1979; 47 years ago
- Type: Non-profit
- Headquarters: Israel
- Services: Medical and social support services for the sick, disabled, and elderly
- Volunteers: 10,000
- Award: Israel Prize for lifetime achievement (2008)

Ezer Mizion or Ezer Mitzion (Hebrew: עזר מציון, literal translation: "Aid from Zion") is an Israeli health support organization offering a wide range of medical and social support services for Israel's sick, disabled and elderly.

== Projects ==
Ezer Mizion, established in 1979, runs the world's largest Jewish Bone Marrow Donor Registry. The registry was extended significantly by Moti and Bracha Ziser who founded "Oranit house," a center for cancer patients and their families. It also operates specialized programs for special needs children, cancer patients and terror victims.

Ezer Mizion has branches throughout Israel. All of its services are free, with 30,000 volunteers nationwide.

== Awards and recognition ==
In 2008, the organization was awarded the Israel Prize for lifetime achievement & special contribution to society and the State of Israel.

== See also ==
- List of Israel Prize recipients
