= Ha-Chaverim shel Natasha =

Former Israeli rock band

Ha-Chaverim shel Natasha החברים של נטאשה
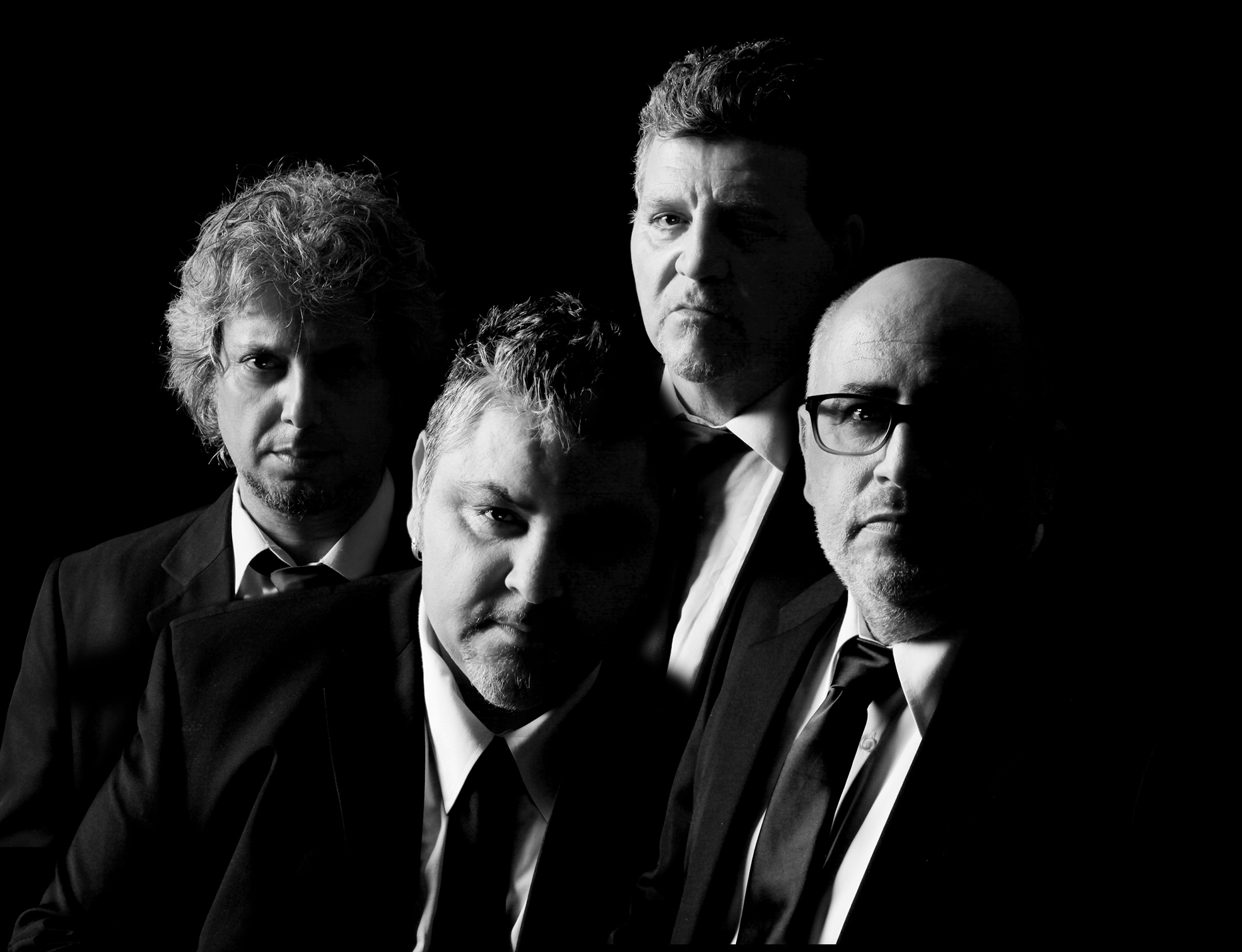
- Promotional photo of the group for their 2013 reunion tour

Background information
- Origin: Tel-Aviv, Israel
- Genres: Rock
- Years active: 1987-1996, 2008, 2013-present
- Labels: Hed-Arzi
- Members: Micha Shitrit; Arkadi Duchin; Jean-Paul Zimbris; Miki Harari; Golan Zuskovich

Ha-Chaverim shel Natasha (The Friends of Natasha or Natasha's Friends in English, Hebrew: החברים של נטאשה) is a former Israeli rock band, highly regarded by critics, which was one of the most popular Israeli bands during the 1990s. The band released three studio albums.

The band was formed by Micha Shitrit, who was born in Nahariya, to a Jewish Moroccan family, and Arkadi Duchin, who emigrated with his family from the former Soviet Union to Kiryat Yam.

Shitrit and Duchin met as teenagers in Haifa and began collaborating when Shitrit handled lyrics and vocals, while Duchin composed. At age 22 the two moved to Tel Aviv and started working on their music careers. In 1987 Hachaverim shel Natasha ("Natasha's Friends") was formed with Shitrit and Duchin as vocalists, Duchin on synth, Miki Harari on guitar and Shlomo (Kozo) Elmkayes on bass.

The band's self titled debut album "Hachaverim shel Natasha", was released at the close of 1989, with future Genesis drummer Nir Zidkyahu on drums, but did not reap any economic benefits for the band, although it did manage to achieve much artistic recognition. The band's 1991 album "Shinuim be-herguelei hatzricha" ("Changes in Screaming patterns") marked Natasha's leap to stardom and featured most of the band's hits. A 2-CD concept album, "Radio bla bla" (1994), was their most successful. Natasha's last album was a live concert recording, as the band split in 1996. Following the split, both Shitrit and Duchin pursued successful solo careers.

In 2001, a 2-CD compilation of the group's hits and non-album singles, Ha-osef (The Collection), was released by Hed-Arzi without the group's knowledge or consent. In 2004, the group sued Hed-Arzi for unpaid royalties.

Friends of Natasha also addressed its political concerns indirectly. "We're not singing the news," said Shitrit. "If you want to say something, you go to the backs of people's heads, to the subconscious -- not between the eyes. First, we have to open people's feelings," Shitrit said. "We have to be the pumice that wears down the callus. After that, we can talk about everything directly."

The group reunited in 2013 and have since continued performing around Israel.

In 2020, the group performed a show to celebrate 25 years since the release of Radio Blah Blah, also releasing it on quadruple LP.

== Discography ==
- Ha-chaverim shel Natasha (1989)
- Shinuim be-hergelei hatzricha (1991)
- Radio Bla Bla (1994)
- Live (1996)
