= Seiko Lee =

Japanese soprano singer, musician, composer, and peace advocate

- Born: Tokyo, Japan
- Genres: Opera
- Occupations: Soprano singer, musician, songwriter, peace advocate
- Instrument: Vocals

Seiko Lee is a Japanese soprano singer, musician, songwriter, and peace advocate.

== Early life ==
Seiko Lee was born in Tokyo, Japan. She began singing and playing both piano and flute at the age of five. For ten years, she was a member of the NHK Children’s Chorus, touring internationally multiple times.

== Education and career ==
Lee attended Tokyo Metropolitan Art High School and later pursued advanced musical studies at the Tokyo National University of Fine Arts. Following her graduation, Lee relocated to the United States, where she performed at La Scaletta Opera in New York City and collaborated with the Connecticut Opera and Henry Street Opera.

Lee has performed as a soloist with ensembles including the New York Philharmonic and the NYC Symphony chamber music ensemble, and has appeared in performances with the Goldman Memorial Band at Lincoln Center, the Temple Recital Series in Salt Lake City, Utah, and at the Universal Peace Federation’s inaugural ceremony at Alice Tully Hall.

Miss Lee has held roles in international productions such as Carmen, Macbeth, La Traviata, Suor Angelica, Così fan tutte, and Un Destino Immortale across opera houses in Europe, South America, Asia, and the U.S. Her discography includes solo recordings with labels such as Sony, RCA Victor, and Manhattan Center Records.

== Activism ==
In 2009, Lee founded a non-profit organization focused on issues of world peace and human rights. The foundation's activities include projects for Rwanda, Zambia, West Africa, and Guinea Bissau.

On July 28, 2013, Lee held a benefit concert in New York City to raise funds for humanitarian relief efforts for those affected by the conflict in Syria.

== Recordings and video ==
- Song of Peace, CD, Music by Sibelius, Gounod, Rodgers and Hammerstein, etc. Copyright 2001
- Liberation-Songs of My Spiritual Country, CD, Traditional Korean Melodies, Copyright, 2005, 2005
- Halelu-Songs of David, CD, Cantata for Peace, Music by David D'Or and David Eaton, Copyright, David Eaton/David D'Or, 2007
