= At Montreux Jazz Festival =

Live album by Ofra Haza
- Released: 1998, 2004, 2005
- Recorded: Montreux, Switzerland (July 13, 1990)
- Genres: Progressive electronic music, World music
- Length: 74:03
- Label: Locust Music

Ofra Haza chronology
Ofra Haza (1997)	At Montreux Jazz Festival (1998)	Manginat Halev Vol. 1 • Melody of the Heart Vol. 1 (2000)

At Montreux Jazz Festival is a 1998 album by Israeli singer Ofra Haza. The recording which captures Haza and a five-piece band live at the Montreux Jazz Festival in July 1990 comprises material from her international studio albums Shaday, Yemenite Songs and Desert Wind, including hit singles like "Im Nin' Alu", "Galbi", "Shaday", "Ya Ba Ye", as well as Yemeni Jewish traditionals and the a cappella performance of "Love Song" with lyrics from The Song of Songs.

The album was recorded in 1990, first issued in 1998 and re-released in Israel on 2004 on Hed Arzi, and later internationally on the Locust Music label in 2005.

The live concert film released in 2007.

== Track listing ==
1. "Im Nin' Alu" (Shabazi) - 4:00
2. "Hilwi" (Traditional) - 3:55
3. "Eshal" (Aloni, Haza) - 4:31
4. "Asalk" (Amram, Shabazi) - 5:13
5. "Taw Shi" (Aloni, Dolby, Haza) - 4:07
6. "Fatamorgana" (Aloni, Haza) - 4:48
7. Medley: "Galbi"/"Wen Esalam"/"Ayooma" (Aloni, Amram, Haza, Traditional) - 16:03
8. "Dassa" (Aloni, Haza) - 3:03
9. "Shaday" (Aloni, Haza) - 6:21
10. "La Fa La" (Shabazi) - 8:29
11. "Love Song" (Aloni, Traditional) - 2:57
12. "Ya Ba Ye" (Aloni, Haza) - 4:49
13. "Kaddish" (Aloni, Haza) - 5:37

== Personnel ==
- Ofra Haza - lead vocals
- Eric Person - flute, saxophone
- Haim Cotton - keyboards
- Tzour Ben Zeev - electric bass
- Jim Mussen - drums
- Daniel Sadownick - congas, bongos, timbales, percussion
