= Ayyalath Hen =

Jewish liturgical poem

"Ayyalath Hen" (Hebrew: אַיֶּלֶת חֵן, romanized: ʾAyyālaṯ Ḥēn, lit. 'A Graceful Doe') is a Hebrew Jewish piyyut (liturgical poem) written by Rabbi Shalom Shabazi. It is sung by Yemenite Jewish communities to grooms during the Sheva Brachot.

The piyyut is an acrostic, spelling the author's name (Hebrew: אלשבזי משתא, romanized: Al-Shabazi Mashta).

== Popular culture ==
Ayyalath Hen was sung by Ofra Haza on her 1984 album Yemenite Songs and by Zion Golan in 1995.
