= Forever (Ofra Haza album) =

Greatest hits album by Ofra Haza
- Released: March 25, 2008
- Recorded: 1988–1997
- Genre: Progressive electronic music, world music
- Length: 57:56
- Label: Edel Records

Ofra Haza chronology
Manginat Halev Vol. 2 • Melody of the Heart Vol. 2 (2004)	Forever (2008)

Forever, subtitled as Her Greatest Songs Remixed, is a 2008 greatest hits album of recordings by Israeli singer Ofra Haza, released on the Edel Records label. The compilation features remixed versions by production team Ferris Bueller and Kai Panschow of tracks from Haza's international albums, mainly focussing on material from the bestselling Shaday (1988) and Desert Wind (1989), including some of her best-known songs like "Im Nin'alu", "Galbi", "Shaday", "Love Song", "Ya Ba Ye", "Fatamorgana" and "Kaddish" as well as the previously unreleased recording "The Poem".

The album was released in Continental Europe on the 20th anniversary of Haza's international breakthrough with the Played In Full remix of the traditional Yemeni Jewish folk song "Im Nin'alu".

== Track listing ==
1. "Shaday" - 5:44
2. "Galbi" - 3:31
3. "Im Nin'alu" (Version 2008) - 3:07
4. "Fatamorgana" - 4:11
5. "Eshal" - 4:12
6. "Ya Hil We" - 3:17
7. "Asalk" - 4:33
8. "Ya Ba Ye" - 3:24
9. "Love Song" (The Biblical "Song Of Songs") - 6:59
10. "La Fa La" - 4:07
11. "Taw Shee" - 2:57
12. "Kaddish" - 5:13
13. "The Poem" (Previously unreleased) - 3:37
14. "Im Nin' Alu" (Unplugged Mix) - 3:04
15. "Im Nin' Alu" (The Bridge Mix) (iTunes Bonus Track) - 4:06
16. "Im Nin' Alu" (Brixxton Squad Mix) (iTunes Bonus Track) - 3:50
