= Shecharchoret =

Shecharchoret (Hebrew: שחרחורת) is a Hebrew folk song, originally composed in Judaeo-Spanish (Ladino) under the title Morenica.

The song was covered by various Israeli artists. A notable cover of the Hebrew version of the song was performed by the Yemenite-Israeli singer Ofra Haza in 1976, and later added to her 2004 album (Greatest Hits, Vol. 2).

== Lyrics ==
Morenika / Shecharchoret Lyrics
Ladino	Hebrew (Transliteration)	Hebrew	English Translation
“Morenika” a mi me yaman Yo blanka nací Y del sol del verano Yo m’hize ansí.	Shecharchoret yikre'uni tzach haya ori umilahat shemesh kayitz ba li shechori	שחרחורת יקראוני צח היה עורי ומלהט שמש קיץ בא לי שחורי	The dark girl, they call me I was born with white skin from the fire of the summer sun I am dark
[Chorus]: Morenika, grasiyoza sos, Tu morena i yo grasiyozo I ojos pretos tú.	[Chorus]: Shecharchoret yafyafit kol kach be'einayich esh bo'eret libi kulo shelach	[פזמון] שחרחורת יפיפית כל כך בעינייך אש בוערת ליבי כולו שלך	[Chorus]: Dark girl so very beautiful in your eyes - a burning fire my heart is all yours
“Morenika” a mi me yaman Los marineros Si otra vez a mi me yaman, Me vo kun elyos.	Shecharchoret yikre'uni kol yordei hayam im od pa'am yikre'uni shuv elech itam	שחרחורת יקראוני כל יורדי הים אם עוד פעם יקראוני שוב אלך איתם	The dark girl, they call me all those who go down to the sea if again they call me I will go with them again
“Morenika” a mi yama, El ijo del Rey; Si otra vez a mi me yama Me vo yo kun él.	Shecharchoret yikre'eni ben le'av molech im od pa'am yikre'eni acharav elech	שחרחורת יקראני בן לאב מוֹלך אם עוד פעם יקראני אחריו אלך	The dark girl, they call me son to the ruling king if he calls me again I will follow him

== Notes ==
1.Alt. spellings: Sheharhoret, Sheḥarḥoret.
2.Alt. spelling: Morenika
