= Ofra Haza (album) =

Studio album by Ofra Haza
- Released: December 1997
- Recorded: January–August 1997
- Studio: Nemo-Studios, Hamburg; Abbey Road Studios, London
- Genre: World music; Mizrahi; ethnic electronica; new-age
- Length: 51:29
- Language: Hebrew; Arabic; English
- Label: BMG
- Producer: Frank Peterson

Ofra Haza chronology
Kirya (1992)	Ofra Haza (1997)	At Montreux Jazz Festival (1998)

Professional ratings
Review scores
Source	Rating
Allmusic	3/5 stars

Ofra Haza is the final studio album by Israeli singer Ofra Haza, released in 1997. It was produced by Frank Peterson (Enigma, Gregorian) and recorded partly at his studio in Hamburg and at Abbey Road Studios in London. The album includes the single "Show Me", an updated version of "Im Nin' Alu", several songs co-written by Peterson, Haza, and her manager Bezalel Aloni, as well as a cover version of Carole King's "You've Got a Friend".

== Track listing ==
1. "Show Me" (Bezalel Aloni, Ofra Haza, Frank Peterson) – 4:12
2. "Amore" (Aloni, Haza) – 4:31
3. "Im Nin' Alu – 2000" (traditional) – 3:38
4. "Sixth Sense" (Aloni, Haza, Peterson) – 4:12
5. "My Ethiopian Boy" (Aloni, Haza) – 4:38
6. "Ahava" (Aloni, Haza, Peterson) – 6:56
7. "No Time to Hate" (Aloni, Haza, Peterson) – 4:24
8. "You've Got a Friend" (Carole King) – 5:17
9. "You" (Aloni, Haza, Peterson) – 5:06
10. "Give Me a Sign" (Aloni, Haza, Peterson) – 4:20
11. "One Day" (Aloni, Haza, Peterson) – 4:17

== Personnel ==
- Pino Palladino – bass guitar
- Peter Weihe – guitar
- Frank Peterson – producer, mixer, keyboards, programming
- Matthias Meissner – keyboards & programming
- Thomas Schwarz – keyboards & programming
- Tony Harrison – narrator, track 11
- Sarah Brightman – backing vocals, track 10
