= Yemenite Songs =

Studio album by Ofra Haza
- Released: November 1984 (Israel); 1985 (Europe); 1986 (Germany); 1987 (US and Japan)
- Recorded: August–September 1984
- Genre: World; Mizrahi; pop
- Length: 38:12
- Language: Hebrew, Arabic
- Label: Hed Arzi; Globe Style Records; Ausfahrt; Shanachie Records
- Producer: Bezalel Aloni, Benny Nagari

Ofra Haza chronology
Bayt Ham • A Place for Me (1984)	Yemenite Songs (1984)	Adamah • Earth (1985)

Alternative Cover
- Fifty Gates of Wisdom

Professional ratings
Review scores
Source	Rating
AllMusic	4.5/5 stars

Yemenite Songs (Hebrew: שירי תימן) is a 1984 album by Ofra Haza, in which the Israeli pop star interpreted traditional Yemeni Jewish songs with lyrics coming from the poetry of 16th century Rabbi Shalom Shabazi. The album was recorded with both traditional and modern musical instruments; wooden and metal percussion, Yemenite tin and tambala, strings, brass and woodwind as well as drum machines and synthesizers. The songs are sung in the Hebrew language with a Yemenite accent and in Arabic.

In US, the album was released under the title Fifty Gates of Wisdom (Yemenite Songs), having a slightly different track order.

== Composition ==
The opening song "Im Nin' Alu"'s a cappella intro would eventually become the starting point of Haza's international career as it was sampled by a number of European and American rap and dance acts like Eric B. & Rakim on their "Paid In Full" and M|A|R|R|S on "Pump Up the Volume" which led to Haza releasing a dance remix of her own recording in 1988 (subtitled Played In Full) which became a pop chart hit in many parts of the world. Remixes of both "Im Nin' Alu" and "Galbi" were included on the first international album Shaday.

== Track listing ==
Side A:

1. "Im Nin'alu" (Shabazi) - 5:18
2. "Yachilvi Veyachali" (Shabazi) - 3:27
3. "A 'Salk" (Shabazi, Traditional) - 4:45
4. "Tzur Mentati"/"Se'i Yona"/"Sapri Tama" (Ben-Amram, Shabazi, Traditional) - 5:44

Side B:

1. "Galbi" (Amram, Shabazi) 4:14
2. "Ode Le-Eli" (Shabazi, Traditional) - 3:31
3. "Lefelach Harimon" (Shabazi, Traditional) 5:08
4. "Ayelet Chen" (Shabazi) - 6:30

== Personnel ==
Credits adapted from the liner notes of Yemenite Songs.

- Ofra Haza - lead vocals
- Benny Nagari - arranger, conductor, music producer
- Lesli Lishinski, Marvin Feinshmit - bassoon
- Ilan School - clarinet, bass clarinet
- Eli Magen - double bass
- Iki Levy - drums, congas, metal and wooden percussion, timbales
- Abigail Erenheim, Benny Nagari - flute, piccolo
- Shlomo Shochat - French horn
- Meril Grinberg, Herman Openstein - oboe, English horn
- Chaim Gispan - percussion (Yemenite tin & tambala)
- Strings: Avraham Rosenblatt, Elchanan Bregman, Israel Berkowitch, Israela Wisser, Rima Kaminkowski, Yigal Tuneh, Yitzchak Markowetzki, Yuval Kaminkowski

== Production ==
- Bezalel Aloni - record producer
- Benny Nagari - music producer/arranger
- Yoav Gera - Audio recording and mixing
- Recorded at Triton Studios, Tel Aviv between August and September 1984.
- Aharon Amram - artistic advisor
