= Shabazi =

Shabazi (Shabbazi, Shabbezi, El-Shibzi (Hebrew: שבזי, Arabic: الشبزي) may refer to:

- Shalom Shabazi, a 17th-century Jewish poet
- Alireza Shapour Shahbazi (1942–2006), an Iranian archeologist and historian
- Shabazi Street, a main street in Rosh Haayin, Israel
