= Galbi (song) =

- 1984 Played Out Mix

Single by Ofra Haza

from the album Yemenite Songs (original version) Shaday (1988 remix)
- Released: 1984 (Israel, Germany); 1986 (UK); 1987 (Europe); 1988 (Worldwide)
- Genre: World
- Length: 4:03 (original); 3:13 (remix)
- Label: Hed Arzi; Globe Style Records; Teldec; Warner Music; Shanachie Records; Sire Records; Ariola Records; Warner Pioneer
- Songwriter: Aharon Amram
- Producers: Bezalel Aloni; Izhar Ashdot

Ofra Haza singles chronology
"Im Nin'Alu" (1987)	"Galbi" (1988)	"Shaday" (1988)

Alternative cover
- 1988 remix

"Galbi" (Arabic: قلبي, "My Heart"; Hebrew: גלבי) is an Arabic musical poem by Israeli Yemenite Aharon Amram, notably sung by fellow Israeli Yemenite singer Ofra Haza and others. The 1988 remix of the song, taken from the album Shaday, was issued as the follow-up to Haza's worldwide chart hit "Im Nin'Alu (Played in Full Remix)".

== History ==
Both "Im Nin'Alu" and "Galbi" were originally recorded for the 1984 album Yemenite Songs (also known as Fifty Gates of Wisdom), containing modern versions of traditional Yemeni Jewish songs, recorded with drum machines and synthesizers but still with comparatively traditional arrangements and instruments, including strings, woodwind and brass, as well as distinctive percussion like Yemeni tin and tambala.

=== Remixes ===
Contrary to popular belief, "Im Nin'Alu" was not the first track from the Yemenite Songs album to be remixed for the dancefloor - in fact it was the other way around. "Galbi" was the first remix to be issued in Israel in 1984 on the Hed Arzi label, then subtitled "Played Out Mix", remixed and re-produced by Izhar Ashdot and clearly influenced by contemporary American dance productions like Chaka Khan's groundbreaking "I Feel for You" with its prominent use of samples, editing, breakbeats and scratching. The "Played Out Mix" which more or less only retained the lead vocals and the string section of the original recording was released both as a 7" and an extended 12" single which later found its way to both Continental Europe and the UK via the independent world music label Globe Style Records in 1985 and became something of an underground club hit. The B-side of the 1985 12" single was in fact the original un-remixed version of "Im Nin'Alu" with its a cappella intro - which may be an explanation as to why the world of British dance music and American hip hop was exposed to the somewhat exotic genre Yemeni Jewish folk music and the sample of Haza's voice later appearing on tracks like Coldcut's "Seven Minutes of Madness" remix of Eric B. & Rakim's "Paid in Full" and M/A/R/R/S' "Pump Up the Volume", both milestones in the history of dance music and both released in 1987.

In 1987, "Galbi" was again remixed, then in the Netherlands by Dutch DJ Peter Vriends and re-issued as a 12" single on the minor label Street Heat with the subtitle "The Dutch Remix", also including the 1984 Israeli "Played Out" remix.

Following the pop chart success of "Im Nin'Alu (Played in Full Remix)" in the summer of 1988, again remixed and re-produced by Izhar Ashdot, also with the assistance of British engineer Bob Kraushaar, "Galbi" was remixed a second time by Ashdot in the autumn of that year, then with an arrangement similar to the million-selling hit single. The "88' Remix" of "Galbi" which also included re-recorded vocals partly in English was first available on the Shaday album and subsequently issued as the follow-up single to "Im Nin'Alu (Played in Full)" in the UK, Continental Europe, Scandinavia, the U.S. and Japan. For the 1988 7" single release, Ashdot mixed two vocal 7" mixes, one with the original Yemeni vocals and the other the re-recorded Yemeni/English version. For the 1988 12"/CD single, he created the extended "Sehoog Mix" (later appearing as a bonus track on Sire Records' CD re-release of the Shaday album), a second 12" mix called "88 Maxi Mix" (only commercially released in France), as well as an alternate 12" instrumental.

Sire Records, the U.S. licensee of the Shaday album, then in turn commissioned further remixes from American and British producers such as Pascal Gabriel in late 1988 which found their way on to the U.S. 12" singles (which also included the Israeli "Played Out" remixes, by then already four years old, and "The Dutch Remix") as well as to 'various artists' dance albums and sampler compilations like Just Say Yo in the Just Say Yes series. Further remixes have followed all throughout the 1990s and 2000s - both on official albums, white label 12" singles, DJ compilations by Razormaid, Disconet, Hot Tracks, Ultimix and DMC as well as bootleg remix compilations.

The latest official remix of "Galbi" was included on the 2008 album Forever Ofra Haza - Her Greatest Songs Remixed, then remixed and re-produced by German production team Ferris Bueller and Kai Panschow, issued on the Edel Records label.

== Critical reception ==
Danny Kelly from NME wrote, "...and this follow-up [to "Im Nin'Alu"] is no disappointment. The reason it is no disappointment is that it's the same damn tune with a few English words augmenting all the usual patented Haza wailings. Even without the comforts of a crate of lager and a shirtful of shish, I still love it."

== Official versions and remixes ==
1984

- Original recording, album Yemenite Songs, a.k.a. Traditional Version - 4:03
- Played Out Mix a.k.a. 12" Long Version a.k.a. Long Super Mix Version - 7:02
- Played Out Single Mix a.k.a. 12" Short Version - 4:04

1987

- Dutch Remix (Peter Vriends & Allstar Fresh) - 6:13

1988

- Shaday Album Mix a.k.a. '88 Mix a.k.a. English/Yemeni Version 7" Mix - 3:13
- '88 Mix Yemeni Version 7" Mix - 3:13
- The Sehoog Mix - 5:08
- '88 Mix 12" Instrumental - 4:08
- '88 Maxi Mix - 5:50
- The Emilio Pasquez Mix - 6:12
- Liquidator Mix (Pascal Gabriel) - 7:03

2008

- 2008 Remix (Ferris Bueller & Kai Panschow)

== Charts ==
=== Weekly charts ===
Chart (1988)	Peak position
Italy Airplay (Music & Media)	5
