= Calcalist =

Israeli daily newspaper

- First edition of the Calcalist, February 18, 2008
- Type: Daily Newspaper
- Format: Tabloid
- Owner: Yedioth Ahronoth Group
- Editor-in-chief: Yoel Esteron
- Founded: 2008; 18 years ago
- Language: Hebrew
- Headquarters: Tel Aviv, Israel
- Country: Israel
- Website: http://www.calcalist.co.il

Calcalist (Hebrew: כלכליסט, a Hebrew wordplay on The Economist, from כלכלה, kalkala; economics) is an Israeli daily business and economics newspaper and website.

== History and profile ==
Calcalist was first published on 18 February 2008, and currently runs five days a week, with a weekend supplement included on Thursdays. The paper is published in Israel by the Yedioth Ahronoth Group. The group also publishes Yedioth Ahronoth, the country's most widely circulated newspaper. The founder and publisher is Yoel Esteron, formerly the managing editor for Yedioth Ahronoth and chief editor of Hadashot, and its editor is Galit Hemi. It is circulated nationwide.

The newspaper is divided into four sections: “News”; “Daily Columns,” which features both regular and rotating topics such as marketing, legal affairs, real estate, technology, finance, automotive, and sports; “The Market,” a separate supplement published Monday through Thursday; and “2016,” the lifestyle section. Calcalist.co.il publishes most of the newspaper’s articles and reports, along with breaking news updates throughout the day and exclusive digital features.

== CTech ==
In November 2017, Calcalist launched an English-language site focusing on Israeli technology news, called CTech.

== See also ==
- Globes
- TheMarker
- List of Israeli newspapers
