= Phonetical singing =

Phonetic singing is singing by learning and performing the lyrics of a song by the words' phonetic sounds, without necessarily understanding the content of the lyrics. For example, an artist performs in Spanish even though they may not be proficient in the language or understand the meaning.

For the DreamWorks animated film The Prince of Egypt, Israeli singer Ofra Haza sang most of the 17 versions of the song "Deliver Us" phonetically.

== Phonetics as a tool ==
Phonetics can be useful to singers in several ways:

=== Learning new languages ===
Professional singers can use phonetics to learn new languages and identify the differences in the pronunciations without necessarily learning the meaning of words. This way, they can also identify the differences between different languages, and adjust the use of phonetics accordingly.

=== Understanding mouth shapes ===
There are different modes of using the open mouth with phonetics. Singers can adjust the shape of their mouth to affect the tone and quality of their voice, advantageously, or, if they do not understand the phonetics aspect, disadvantageously. Subtle differences can make, at times, drastic changes to the sound.

=== Understanding the International Phonetic Alphabet ===
Understanding the International Phonetic Alphabet (IPA) can help a singer with the pronunciation of words. They can link syllables to different phonetic symbols to help as well.

== Learning phonetics as a singer ==
Phonetics helps distinguish differences in pronunciation, but also helps a singer to perform as authentically to the language as possible. Understanding phonetics and its symbols can bypass the necessity to learn the dialect through a Native or Heritage Speaker of the language the singer is learning or attempting to recreate in performance.

Phonetics can also allow singers to dispel their natural tendencies to pronounce words in another language by using the phonetics of their own native language. For example, the pronunciation for the letter "r" in the word "quinceañera" as a native English speaker would be pronounced like: /kɪnseɪənj'ɛɹə/ or (keen-seh-ahn-YEHR-ah), with an emphasis on the "era" pronunciation in English. In Spanish, the pronunciation for "quinceañera" is similar, but the [ɹ] is replaced by a tap-n-flap or the [ɾ] phonetic symbol. In this scenario, the word is pronounced like: /kɪ:nsɛɑnj'ɛɾɑ/. Even though the difference in pronunciation of the letter "r" is what is highlighted in this example, many parts of the word are different when pronouncing the Spanish word in "English" versus pronouncing it in "Spanish."

These subtle differences change everything about the way the singer can mimic sounds as identical as they can to the word's origin.

== See also ==
- Soramimi, where lyrics in one language are substituted by actual/nonsensical words in a different language.
- Mondegreen, when lyrics are misheard and substituted with musically equivalent phrases.
