= Aharon Amram =

Israeli singer (1939–2025)

- אהרן עמרם
- Born: 1939; Sana'a, Yemen
- Died: 1 June 2025 (aged 85–86)
- Known for: Singer, composer, poet and researcher, soldier
- Spouse: Sarah Mashraki
- Children: Five sons

Aharon Amram (Hebrew: אהרן עמרם; 1939 – 1 June 2025) was an Israeli singer, composer, poet and researcher of Yemenite Jewish origin.

== Life and career ==
Amram was born in Sana'a, Yemen in 1939, to Romia and Shlomo Amram, a rabbi. In 1950 he immigrated to Israel with his family as part of Operation Magic Carpet which was designed to bring Yemenite Jews to Israel, where he landed in the transition camp of Rosh HaAyin. Counter to the melting pot attitude of the time, Amram continued the traditional Yemenite style and pronunciation in his singing, refusing to follow his contemporaries who he understood as having been ashamed of their heritage. He was quickly singled out for his beautiful voice and started singing at weddings and events. With the encouragement of the Speaker of the Knesset Yisrael Yeshayahu he studied at the conservatory in Tel Aviv where he was quickly faced with the choice of focusing on either classical music or Yemenite music due to the difference in singing styles. Having chosen the latter, he began to record dozens of short recordings while continuing to perform.

Subsequent to Operation On Wings of Eagles, Amram became "the first to record Yemenite music using instruments from outside its tradition," overcoming initial opposition by Israeli-Yemenite radio broadcasters who traditionally regarded authentic Yemenite music as being with nothing more than a tin drum and didn't want to air his performances. Among the instruments he accompanied his traditional Yemenite singing with were "guitar, violin, qanoun [a kind of zither], trumpet, trombone and percussion instruments."

As Amram started getting recognition for his work, he toured in Europe in the early 1960s including a show at the Olympia in Paris and a filmed performance for the BBC in London. He was married in 1968 and had six children. Amram released many records through the 1960s and 1970s which cemented his status as a singer in Israel and within the Yemenite community and inspired many Israeli Yemenite singers such as Achinoam Nini, Ofra Haza or Zohar Argov. At this time he also wrote the song "Galbi" which was to become a worldwide hit after being sung by Ofra Haza.

During Amram's military service in the Israel Defense Forces, he fought in the Six-Day War and Yom Kippur War. During the latter he participated in the crossing of the Suez Canal. Amram died on 1 June 2025, at the age of 86.

== Preservation of Jewish Yemenite heritage ==
Amram considered Jewish Yemenite music his calling and dedicated his later years to preserving it, as well as the community's traditional religious chants and customs. He recorded all five books of the Torah along with prayers, psalms, Shabbat songs and other liturgical traditions on over 120 CDs.

== See also ==
- Yemenite Hebrew
- Yemenite Jewish poetry
