= Kirya (album) =

Studio album by Ofra Haza
- Released: February 25, 1992
- Recorded: Microplant (Los Angeles), Conway, Devonshire, Record Plant, Bee Studio (Bahia, Brazil) (1991–1992)
- Genre: World; Mizrahi; Ethnic electronica
- Length: 43:46
- Language: Hebrew, Arabic, English
- Label: East West Records, Warner Music Group
- Producer: Don Was, Ofra Haza, and Bezalel Aloni

Ofra Haza chronology
Desert Wind (1989)	Kirya (1992)	Kol Haneshama • My Soul (1994)

Professional ratings
Review scores
Source	Rating
AllMusic	3/5 stars
Calgary Herald	A−

Kirya (an ancient Hebrew nickname for Jerusalem) is a 1992 album by Israeli singer Ofra Haza. Intended as the follow-up to Haza’s internationally successful Shaday (1988) and Desert Wind (1989) albums, it built on her successful blend of Electronic dance music and traditional Middle Eastern sounds, being a logical next step for Haza. Musically, it applied the sensibilities of pop producer Don Was to traditional song writing and instrumentation; lyrically, it delivered powerful themes of longing, joy, and the plight of the downtrodden in several languages, much like Haza's earlier work.

Along with producer Was, Haza was joined by other Western musicians, including a featured duet with Iggy Pop on "Daw Da Hiya", a song about a girl sentenced to death for becoming pregnant out of wedlock while the man responsible remains free. Music videos were made for two of the album's tracks, "Daw Da Hiya" and "Innocent" - "A Requiem for Refugees".

In 1993, the album was nominated for a Grammy in the "Best World Music Album" category, an achievement which to this day has not been matched by any other Israeli singer.

== Track listing ==
1. "Kirya" (Traditional, Haza, Aloni) - 6:11
2. "Horashoot – The Bridge" (Traditional, Ben Amram, Haza, Aloni) - 3:46
3. "Innocent" – A Requiem for Refugees (Haza, Aloni) - 4:46
4. "Trains of No Return" (Haza, Aloni) - 4:15
5. "Mystery Fate and Love" (Haza, Aloni) - 5:24
6. "Daw Da Hiya" (featuring Iggy Pop) (Haza, Aloni, Morriss) - 4:55
7. "Don't Forsake Me" (Traditional, Shabazi, Haza, Aloni) - 4:35
8. "Barefoot" (Haza, Aloni) - 5:14
9. "Take 7/8" (Amram, Haza, Aloni) - 4:35
10. "Today I'll Pray" (Bonus track certain editions) (Haza, Aloni) - 4:33

== Charts ==
Chart (1992)	Peak position
Top World Music Albums	1

== Personnel ==
- Ofra Haza – lead vocals
- Iggy Pop – vocals/narration
- Harry Hyman Vento – violin
- John Belezikjian – violin
- Tzur Ben-Zelev – acoustic bass
- David McMurray – saxophone
- Professor Ali Jihad Racy – percussion
- Rodrigo Manuel – percussion
- Ed Cherney – background vocals
- Randy Jacobs - Electric Guitars, Acoustic guitars and Electric Bass
- Mortonette Jenkins – background vocals
- Natalie Jackson – background vocals
- Marlena Jetter – background vocals
- Valerie Carter – background vocals
- Mark Goldenberg – background vocals, electric guitar, accordion, harmonium

=== Production ===
- Don Was – record producer
- Ofra Haza – producer
- Bezalel Aloni – producer
- Recorded at Microplant, Conway, Devonshire, England; Record Plant Studios, Los Angeles, California; Bee Studio, Bahia, Brazil.
