= Zion Golan =

Israeli singer (born 1955)

Zion Golan ציון גולן
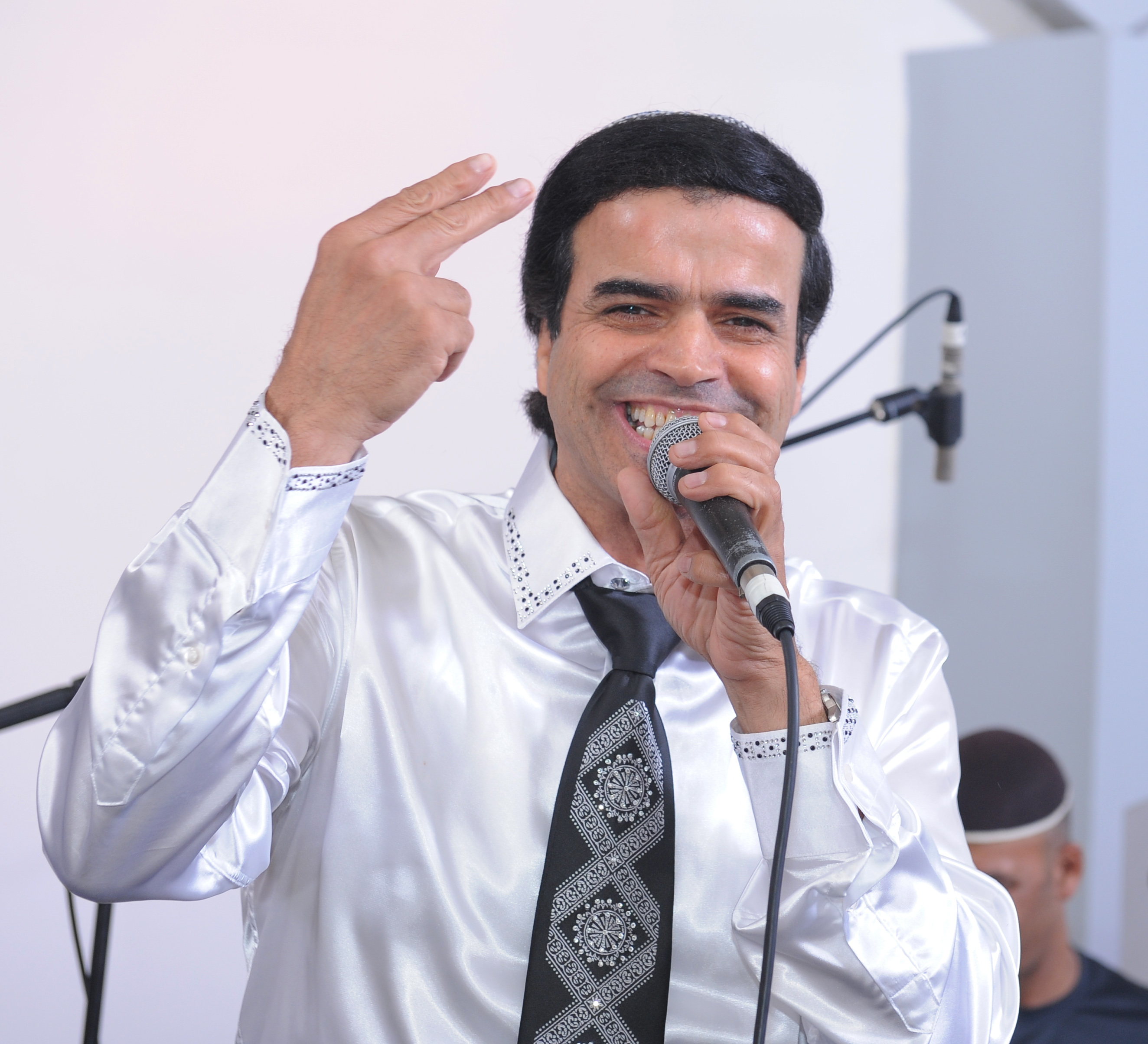

Background information
- Born: Zion Bajdalan; October 6, 1955 (age 70); Ashkelon, Israel
- Origin: Ashkelon, Israel
- Genre: Mizrahi music
- Occupation: Singer
- Years active: 1978-present
- Label: Reuveni Brothers

Zion Golan (Hebrew: ציון גולן Tzion Golan; Arabic: صهيون غولان Sahyoun Ghawlan; زيون غولان Zion Golan; born 1955), also known as Tzion Golan, is an Israeli singer of Yemenite Jewish origin.

== Background ==
Most of Golan's songs are in Judeo-Yemeni Arabic and in Yemenite Hebrew. Most of his songs were written and composed by himself, his mother-in-law Naomi Amrani, and by other writers. Some of his songs were written by the famous Rabbi Shalom Shabazi.

Golan has recorded over 22 albums. He records mostly from a studio in his own home.

=== Personal life ===
Golan was born to Yemeni immigrants in Ashkelon, Israel. An Orthodox Yemenite Jew, he currently lives with his wife and three children (two girls, one boy) in the Ahuzat Etrog neighborhood of Merkaz Shapira.

In 1974, Golan joined the Israel Defense Forces as a soloist in the Israel Army Rabbinical choir.

== Worldwide reach ==
Golan's music is popular outside of Israel, particularly in Yemen, where his family originates. Though the Yemeni government prohibits direct contact with Israel, Golan's records have managed to reach the Yemeni public via the underground, selling around 50,000 copies per album release. It has been reported that his songs are known to "blare from cafes and taxis" in Yemen.

According to an interview in Israeli daily Yedioth Ahronoth, at one point in time Golan was set to give a performance in Yemen, and visas were to be issued by the Jordanian embassy in Tel Aviv, but the concert was canceled because of concerns for Golan's family.

Golan's songs are also sung by contemporary Yemeni singers such as Fadel Al Hamami. In 2018, Golan collaborated with the Yemeni pop singer Hussein Moheb at a wedding in Amman, Jordan of a relative of former Yemeni President Ali Abdullah Saleh.

=== Example of Songs ===
The following songs were written and composed by Israelis, as mentioned on his album covers:

- Aba Shimon – Lyrics by Naomi Amrani, Melody By Zion Golan
- Halaluyoh – Lyrics by Naomi Amrani, Melody By Zion Sharabi
- Bint AlYaman – Lyrics by Aharon Amram, Melody by Zion Golan & Aharon Amram
- Halani – Lyrics by Rabbi Mordechai Yitzhari, Melody by Zion Golan
- Salam Salam – Lyrics by Rabbi Mordechai Yitzhari, Melody by Zion Golan
- Ahai Bane Teman – Lyrics by Rabbi Mordechai Yitzhari, Melody by Zion Golan
- Yuma Ya Yuma – Lyrics by Naomi Amrani, Melody by Zion Golan
- Sali Galbi – Lyrics by Naomi Amrani, Melody by Jacky Tubie
- Yom Al Ahad – Lyrics by Naomi Amrani, Melody by Jacky Tubie
- Diker Almahiba – Lyrics and Melody by Aharon Amram
- Adan Adan – Lyrics and Melody by Naomi Amrani
- Shufuni Be'Enak – Lyrics by Naomi Amrani, Melody by Zion Golan
- Rais Al-Mal – Lyrics by Leah Zlotnik, Melody by Lior Farhi
- Alf Mabruk – Lyrics and Melody by Zion Golan
- Yaman Yaman – Lyrics and Melody by Naomi Amrani
- Allah Yhibak – Lyrics and Melody by Aharon Amram

== Selected discography ==
- leAkhai Bani Teman, 1992 (Hebrew: לאחי בני תימן, To my Yemeni brothers)
- Salam Salam, 1995 (Hebrew: סלאם סלאם)
- Abo Sholem Shabazi, 2000 (Hebrew: אבא שלום שבזי)
- miTemon liYisroel, 2001 (Hebrew: מתימן לישראל, From Yemen to Israel)
- Ashorer Shir, 2001? (Hebrew: אשורר שיר)
- Irham ya Rabi, 2004 (Hebrew: ארחם יא רבי)
- Mahrozot Niflaot v'Duetim, 2005 (Hebrew: מחרוזות נפלאות ודואטים)
