= Narkis =

Narkis (Hebrew: נרקיס) is a surname from the Hebrew form of Narcissus. It may refer to:

- Bezalel Narkiss (1926–2008), Israeli art historian
- Lior Narkis (born 1976), Israeli singer
- Uzi Narkis (1925–1997), Israeli general
- Narkis (born 1981), Israeli singer

== See also ==
- Narcissus (disambiguation)
