= Desert Wind (album) =

Studio album by Ofra Haza
- Released: September 29th 1989 (Europe); October 1989 (France, Scandinavia); November 17, 1989 (Japan); January 15, 1990 (US)
- Recorded: 1988–1989
- Genre: World; mizrahi; ethnic electronica; synth-pop; house
- Length: 49:15
- Language: Hebrew, Arabic, English
- Label: Sire/Warner Bros. Records (U.S.); 25976; Teldec/WEA Records (international); Warner Pioneer Records (Japan); Hed Arzi (Israel)
- Producer: Arif Mardin; Joe Mardin; Ofra Haza; Thomas Dolby; Bezalel Aloni

Ofra Haza chronology
Shaday (1988)	Desert Wind (1989)	Kirya (1992)

Professional ratings
Review scores
Source	Rating
AllMusic	4.5/5 stars
Chicago Tribune	3/4 stars
The Encyclopedia of Popular Music	3/5 stars
Orlando Sentinel	3/5 stars
The Rolling Stone Album Guide	2.5/5 stars
Spin	(positive)

Desert Wind is an album by the Israeli singer Ofra Haza, released in 1989. Popular in Israel, Haza was unknown in the rest of the world until the previous year, when the song "Im Nin'Alu" and the album Shaday were released. Desert Wind was therefore more oriented toward the international market.

The main language of the album is English, however Haza also sings in Arabic, Hebrew, and the ancient language of Aramaic. The album includes traditional folk Yemenite songs. The sound is a mainstream form of dance music with elements of synthpop and, on track 8, an influence of house music. The album ends with "Kaddish," a Jewish prayer that, as Haza writes, is meant to hold all the world's sorrows on the wings of an angel. The song has a short English introduction; the main part of the prayer is in Aramaic.

== Production ==
The album was produced by Arif Mardin, Joe Mardin, Haza, Thomas Dolby, and Bezalel Aloni.

== Critical reception ==
Trouser Press wrote: "Making a self-conscious effort to maintain a connection to her musical roots while reaching out for mainstream appeal, Haza locates a fascinating midpoint between the Middle East and the Midwest on 'Ya Ba Ye', 'I Want to Fly' and 'Da’Asa'." New York wrote that "the novelty of combining religious music with drum programs is interesting only the first few times ... Haza is at her best on the slow, dolorous closing cut, 'Kaddish'." Spin thought that the music "teases our Western rock'n'roll longing for strangeness, then satisfies it by giving us soul and personality and cultural context."

== Track listing ==
1. "Wish Me Luck" (Aloni, Haza) - 4:10
2. "Ya Ba Ye" (Aloni, Haza) - 5:06
3. "Middle East" (Aloni, Haza, Mardin) - 4:37
4. "I Want to Fly" (Aloni, Amram, Haza) - 4:26
5. "Slave Dream" (Aloni, Haza) - 4:46
6. "Taw Shi" (Aloni, Dolby, Haza) - 3:28
7. "Mm'mma (My Brothers Are There)" (Aloni, Haza) - 4:23
8. "In Ta" (Aloni, Haza) - 5:50
9. "Fatamorgana (Mirage)" (Aloni, Haza) - 4:59
10. "Da'asa" (Aloni, Haza) - 2:41
11. "Kaddish" (Aloni, Haza) - 4:34

== Personnel ==
- Ofra Haza - lead vocals
- Fonzi Thornton - backing vocals track 3
- Lani Groves - backing vocals track 3
- Lisa Fischer - backing vocals track 3
- Mark Stevens - backing vocals track 3
- Rachele Cappelli - backing vocals track 3
- Kadya (Shoshana) Haza - vocals track 9
- Joe Mardin - keyboards, programming, vocoder, conductor strings, drums, backing vocals
- Omar Faruk Tekbilek - baglama, oud (ut)
- Gene Orloff - concertmaster
- Iki Levy - drums and percussion programming, cymbal, loops, goblet drum (darbuka solo),
- Yaron Bachar - keyboards
- Andy Paley - additional guitars
- Paul Pesco - guitar
- Adi Dgani - keyboards
- Dario Malki - keyboards
- Rodrigo Manuel - percussion
- Larry Treadwell - guitar
- Thomas Dolby - keyboards, drum programming, backing vocals
- Nyle Stynner - windsynth
- Joshua Fried - keyboards, drums, programming, musical shoe tree
- Dario Malki - keyboards

=== Production ===
- Arif Mardin - record producer tracks 1 to 3, 7, 8, musical arranger
- Bezalel Aloni - producer tracks 4, 5, 10, 11, musical arranger
- Joe Mardin - producer tracks 1 to 3, 6, 8, musical arranger
- Ofra Haza - producer tracks 4, 5, 10, 11, musical arranger
- Thomas Dolby - producer tracks 5, 6, musical arranger
- Joshua Fried - musical arranger, additional production
- Scott Canto - sound engineer
- Chris Trevitt - sound engineer
- Metal Dan Wood - sound engineer
- Dave Lebowitz - sound engineer
- Glenn Zimet - sound engineer
- Joe Mardin - sound engineer
- Rich July - sound engineer
- Michael O'Reilly - sound engineer
- Rod Hui - sound engineer
- Peter Robins - sound engineer
- Ziv Sidi - sound engineer
- Brian Malouf - sound engineer
- John Jackson - sound engineer
- Toby Wright - sound engineer
- Ted Jensen - audio mastering
- Recorded at Green Street Recording, NYC, "Z" Sound Studios, NYC and Can Am Studios, Tarzana, CA. Vocals and strings on track 1 recorded at SoundTrack and Clinton Studios, NYC. Mixed at Green Street Studio, NYC. Mastered at Sterling Sound, NYC.

== Charts ==
Chart (1989)	Peak position
US Billboard 200	156
