= Yoel Esteron =

Yoel Esteron (Hebrew: יואל אסתרון; born in 1956), is the founder and publisher of Israel’s leading daily financial newspaper Calcalist, founded in 2008. According to SimilarWeb, which monitors websites, Calcalist.co.il has more than four million unique users monthly, making it the most popular business website in the country. In November 2017, Esteron Founded CTech (calcalistech.com), a technology news site providing international readers with high-impact stories from the Israeli tech scene.

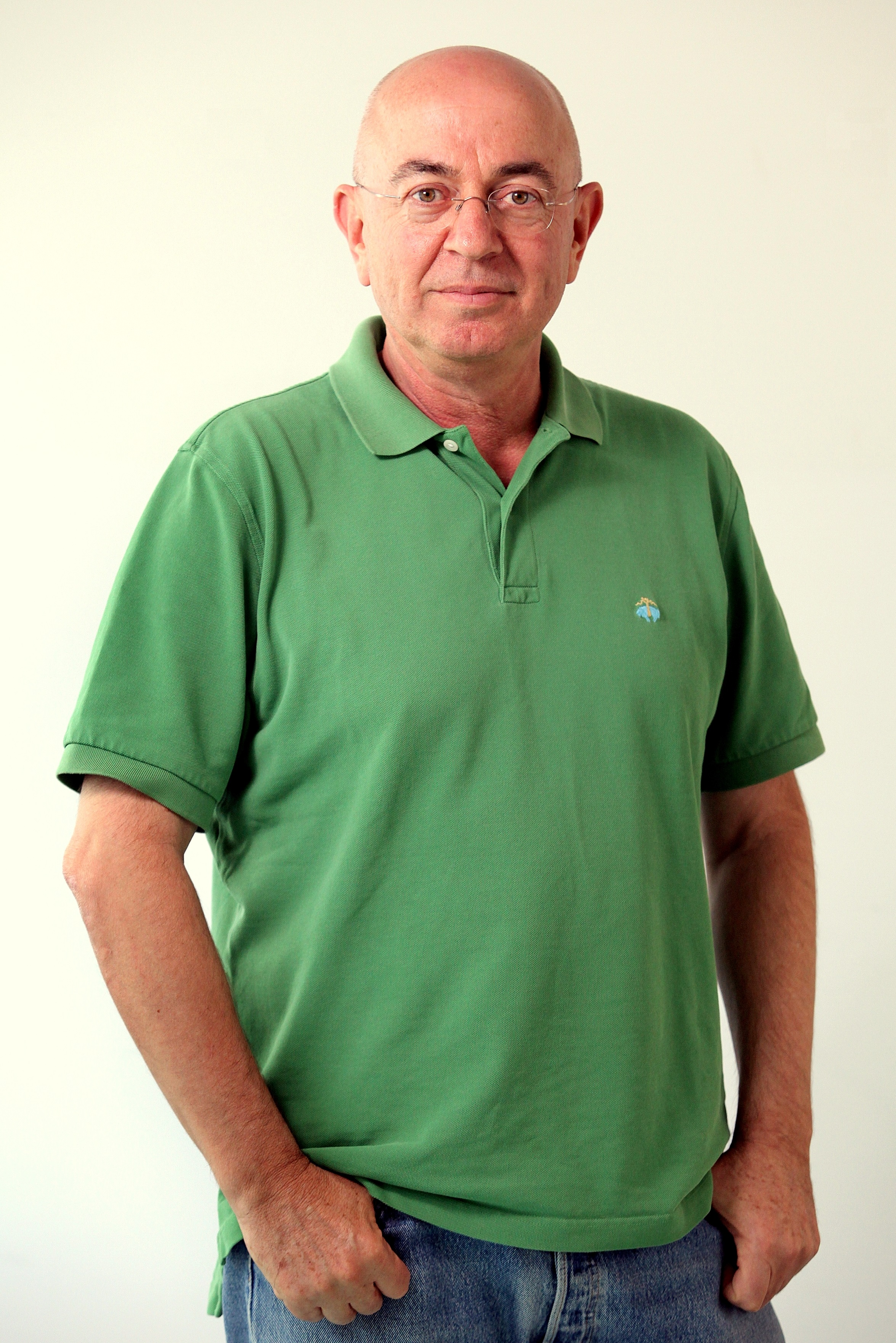

Esteron also started Calcalist's national and international prestigious conferences, among them "The Airborne Conference" to Silicon Valley, "Israel Forecasts" and "The National Conference" in Tel Aviv, "Mind The Tech" in New York, London, Berlin, Paris and Dubai; and many start-ups competitions. For many years he has been involved in the Israeli Hi-Tech scene. He serves on the boards of GAMI - WAN-IFRA Global Alliance for Media Innovation, The Academic College of Tel Aviv-Yafo, and Docaviv - Tel Aviv International Documentary Film Festival.

In 2020 Esteron co-founded with philanthropists Laura and Gary Lauder Shomrim www.shomrim.news - Center for Media and Democracy in Israel - and is serving as Shomrim's chairman.

== Biography ==
Yoel Esteron earned a degree in economics from the Hebrew University of Jerusalem.

== Media career ==
Esteron worked for Israel Defense Forces Radio as a military correspondent and a diplomatic correspondent during Henry Kissinger's shuttle diplomacy in the region in 1974-1975. He was a correspondent and editor at Channel 1 for six years before moving to the printed media.

In the 1980s he was Editor-in-Chief of Jerusalem's Kol HaIr weekly and Tel Aviv HaIr weekly, then Hadashot's Washington bureau chief between 1988 and 1991 and then the newspaper's Editor-in-Chief between 1991 and 1993. For ten years, 1994 to 2004, he served as Managing Editor of Haaretz. As managing editor, in 1997 he founded the Haaretz English edition, in print and online as a joint venture of Haaretz and The International Herald Tribune. In the years 2005-2007, he served as Managing Editor of Yedioth Ahronoth, the largest circulation newspaper in Israel.

Esteron was a lecturer in Media and Politics at the Koteret School of Journalism in Tel Aviv. Since 2003, he has been teaching Media and Politics at the IDC school of government in Herzelia.
