= Im Nin'alu =

Single by Ofra Haza

from the album Yemenite Songs (original version), Shaday, and Ofra Haza
- Released: April 1988
- Genre: Pop; world
- Length: 3:28
- Label: Hed Arzi
- Songwriters: Traditional; Shabazy; Rabbi Shalom-Shabazi
- Producers: Bezalel Aloni; Izhar Ashdot

Ofra Haza singles chronology
"Hi" (1983)	"Im Nin'alu" (1988)	"Galbi" (1988)

Music video
- "Im Nin'Alu" on YouTube

"Im Nin'alu" (אם ננעלו) (English: If the gates are locked) is a Hebrew poem by 17th-century Rabbi Shalom Shabazi. It has been set to music and sung by Israeli singer Ofra Haza and others. Haza first performed this song with the Shechunat Hatikva Workshop Theatre, appearing on television on IBA's General Television in 1978. The original version was included on the 1984 album Yemenite Songs, also known as Fifty Gates of Wisdom. The remixed version was part of her international debut album Shaday of 1988.

"Im Nin'alu" went on to become famous in Europe when a remixed version of the song, produced by Izhar Ashdot, reached the top 10 in many countries. The single reached number one in Finland, Norway, Spain, Switzerland and West Germany, where it stayed nine weeks atop the singles chart in mid-1988. In the United Kingdom, the track was a top-20 hit, peaking at number 15, and in the United States, it reached number 15 on Billboard's Hot Dance Club Play chart and number 18 on the Modern Rock Tracks chart. The single reportedly sold some three million copies worldwide, making it one of the first world music recordings to extend over to mainstream pop chart success. London-based duo Coldcut produced a remix of Eric B. & Rakim's "Paid in Full", which heavily samples "Im Nin'alu".

Even though Haza's version of the song shows her own interpretation, and its reception was present-day and popular, it still fits in with the Yemenite tradition that she represented. In 1997, Haza re-recorded the track for her eponymous album Ofra Haza, produced by Frank Peterson of Enigma and Gregorian. The German promo 12-inch for the album's lead single "Show Me" also featured two remixes of "Im Nin'Alu". And in 2008 two new remixes were included on the greatest hits compilation Forever Ofra Haza – Her Greatest Songs Remixed.

The international follow-up single to "Im Nin'Alu (Played in Full)" in 1988 was a remix of the track "Galbi", also originally from the Yemenite Songs album.

== Poem "Im Nin'alu" ==
The poem begins with the words

אם ננעלו דלתי נדיבים דלתי מרום לא ננעלו

Im nin'alu daltei n'divim daltei marom lo nin'alu

Even if the gates of the generous are locked, the gates of heaven will never be locked.

== Critical reception ==
In his review of the song, Paul Clements from Melody Maker said "something in THAT VOICE does ring four-dimensional, mysterious, and otherworldly in my uninitiated Western ears." Myrna Minkoff from NME named "Im Nin'alu" Single of the Week, writing, "A thrilling happening. Not in a prickly, shiver, shiver thrilling kind of way nor in a whoosh! loop-the-loop thrilling kind of way. Thrilling in a steady way. It's as magnificent and unfathomable as the reasoning behind a suspension bridge, governed by the same miracles as tension. Even the bits that sound like the South Bank Show theme. Original producer Izhar Ashdot is the remixer who works wonders amongst the sheaves of sequencers and Yeminite percussion."

== Official versions and remixes ==
1984

- Original recording, Yemenite Songs album a.k.a. Traditional Version - 5:18

1988

- Shaday Album Mix (Played In Full 7" Mix - English Vocal - Edited) - 3:29
- Played In Full Edit (Ariola Records 7", West Germany) - 3:53
- Played In Full 7" Mix - 4:05
- Played In Full 7" Mix - English Vocal - 4:05
- Played In Full - 7" Yemen Vocal (Teldec 7", West Germany) - 4:50
- Played In Full Mix (12") - 5:45
- Instrumental Dub (U.S. 12") - 5:49
- Extended Mix (12") - 6:40
- Gates of Heaven Mix (Mark Kamins and Frank Inglese, U.S. 12") - 6:54

1997

- "Im Nin'alu 2000" - 1997 re-recording, album Ofra Haza - 3:38
- 1997 Re-Recording - Ofra Goes To Hollywood Mix ("Show Me" Promo 12", Germany) - 5:15
- 1997 Re-Recording - Some Skunk Funk Remix ("Show Me" Promo 12", Germany) - 7:30

2008

- 2008 Version, album Forever Ofra Haza - Her Greatest Songs Remixed
- Unplugged Mix, album Forever Ofra Haza - Her Greatest Songs Remixed
- Bridge Mix, album Forever Ofra Haza - Her Greatest Songs Remixed
- Brixxton Squad Mix, album Forever Ofra Haza - Her Greatest Songs Remixed

== Charts ==
=== Weekly charts ===
Chart (1988–1989)	Peak position
Austria (Ö3 Austria Top 40)	2
Belgium (Ultratop 50 Flanders)	14
Canada Dance/Urban (RPM)	6
Denmark (IFPI)	6
Europe (European Hot 100 Singles)	1
Finland (Suomen virallinen lista)	1
France (SNEP)	6
Greece (Greek Singles Chart)	1
Ireland (IRMA)	16
Israel (Reshet Gimel)	2
Italy (Musica e dischi)	24
Netherlands (Single Top 100)	29
Norway (VG-lista)	1
Portugal (Portuguese Singles Chart)	1
Spain (AFYVE)	1
Sweden (Sverigetopplistan)	2
Switzerland (Schweizer Hitparade)	1
UK Singles (OCC)	15
US Alternative Airplay (Billboard)	18
US Dance Club Songs (Billboard) with "Galbi"	15
US Dance Singles Sales (Billboard) with "Galbi"	22
West Germany (GfK)	1

=== Year-end charts ===
End of year chart (1988)	Position
Austria (Ö3 Austria Top 40)	11
Canada Dance/Urban (RPM)	25
Europe (European Hot 100 Singles)	3
Israel (Reshet Gimel)	18
Switzerland (Schweizer Hitparade)	4
West Germany (Media Control)	2

== Certifications ==
Country	Certification	Date	Sales certified
France	Silver	1988	250,000
Sweden	Gold	21 September 1988	10,000
West Germany	Gold	1988	250,000

== Samples and other versions ==
The song was prominently sampled in the chorus of the 'Seven Minutes of Madness' remix of the rap duo Eric B. & Rakim's 1987 single "Paid in Full" and Snoop Dogg used the same sample on his re-recorded version of "Paid in Full" titled "Paper'd Up" from his album Paid tha Cost to Be da Bo$$.

Canadian band Delerium sample the lyrics in their song "Hidden Mask", from the 1989 album Faces, Forms & Illusions.

American rap group Public Enemy also sampled the opening few seconds of the song (which are a cappella) on the track "Can't Truss It", featured on the 1991 album Apocalypse '91...The Enemy Strikes Black.

In 1998 Swedish DJ team C&N Project included a sample of the opening line "Im nin'alu" on their single "The Queen of Tel Aviv", which was credited to C&N Project Featuring Ofra Haza.

Israeli singer Michal Cohen performs "Im Nin'alu" on La Kahena (2005) by DJ Cheb i Sabbah.

In the album Confessions on a Dance Floor and in The Confessions Tour by Madonna (2007) the track "Isaac" includes a portion of the poem.

"Im Nin'alu" is the opening track on Eliyahu & The Qadim Ensemble's album Eastern Wind (2009), with lead vocals by Rachel Valfer.

In 2009 Panjabi MC remixed this song on his album named Indian Timing.

In 2012, Jazz quartet Third World Love performed a version of Im Nin'alu on their album Songs and Portraits.

In 2014, Ishay Ribo released a version of the song on his debut album.

In 2018 the song was recorded by Israeli pop artist Harel Skaat.

In 2019 the song was used in the opening of the Eurovision Song Contest 2019 along with Toy

In 2021, the song was recorded by Israeli singer Narkis.
