= Shalom Shabazi =

17th C. Jewish rabbi and poet in Yemen

Rabbi Shalom Shabazi שלום שבזי
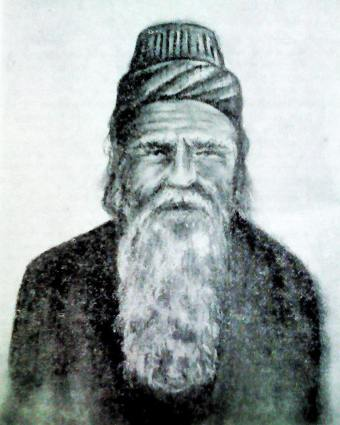
- An illustration of Shabazi.

Personal life
- Born: Shalom ben Yosef; 1619 Najd Al-Walid, Yemen Eyalet
- Died: 1720 (aged 100–101) Ta'izz, Yemeni Zaidi State
- Occupation: Rabbi, poet, religious scholar.

Religious life
- Religion: Judaism

Jewish leader
- Residence: Yemen

Shalom Shabazi (1619 – c. 1720) was the son of Yosef ben Avigad, of the family of Mashtā, also commonly known as Abba Sholem Shabazi or Saalem al-Shabazi (Hebrew: שלום שבזי; Arabic: سالم الشبزي). He was a Jewish rabbi and poet who lived in 17th century Yemen, often referred to as the arch-poet of Yemen.

== Life and works ==
Shabazi was born in 1619 in the town of Najd al-Walid. He claimed descent from Zerah, the son of Judah. At the death of his father, Yosef Mashta, Shalom moved to the small town of Shabaz, near the city of Ta'izz.

Soon after he moved to Ta'izz (where he built a house of prayer and a mikveh outside the city beneath Jebel Ṣabir), he and his family were expelled along with most of the Yemenite Jews in 1679. Shabazi, like many Jews of his generation, was influenced by Shabbetai Zevi and thought that he might be the messiah. He died c. 1720 and was buried in Ta'izz, at the foot of Jabal Sabir. In the early 20th century the grave of Shabazi was a place of pilgrimage for both Jews and Muslims, especially for those who sought healing.

His father, Yosef ben Abijad ben Khalfun, was also a rabbi and a poet. Shabazi's extant poetic diwan, comprising some 550 poems, was published for the first time by the Ben-Zvi Institute in 1977. He wrote in Hebrew, Aramaic, and Judeo-Arabic. Shabazi's other works include a treatise on Jewish astrology, a kabbalistic commentary on the Torah, and a work entitled Sefer ha-Margalith. He is sometimes called the "Shakespeare of Yemen".

He wrote a commentary on the Torah called Hemdath Yamim (Pleasant Days). His leadership was instrumental in helping the Jews of Yemen survive some of the worst persecution in its history. Mori (Yemenites often call their spiritual leaders "Mori" meaning "my master" or "my teacher"). Shabazi wrote a kinah (lamentation) for recitation during the Ninth of Av, recalling the 1679 exile of Jews (known as the Exile of Mawza) from all cities and towns in Yemen to an inhospitable desert called Mawza, where 20% of those exiled perished.

The Diwan of Mori Shabazi also alludes to the Decree of the Headgear in 1667. Shabazi's Diwan has become an essential part of Yemenite Jewry's spiritual and cultural lives.

Currently, the Israeli government and the Chief Rabbinate are trying to bring the remains of Rabbi Shabazi to Israel. Many of his poems have elaborate detailed premonitions of returning to Israel, with his people.

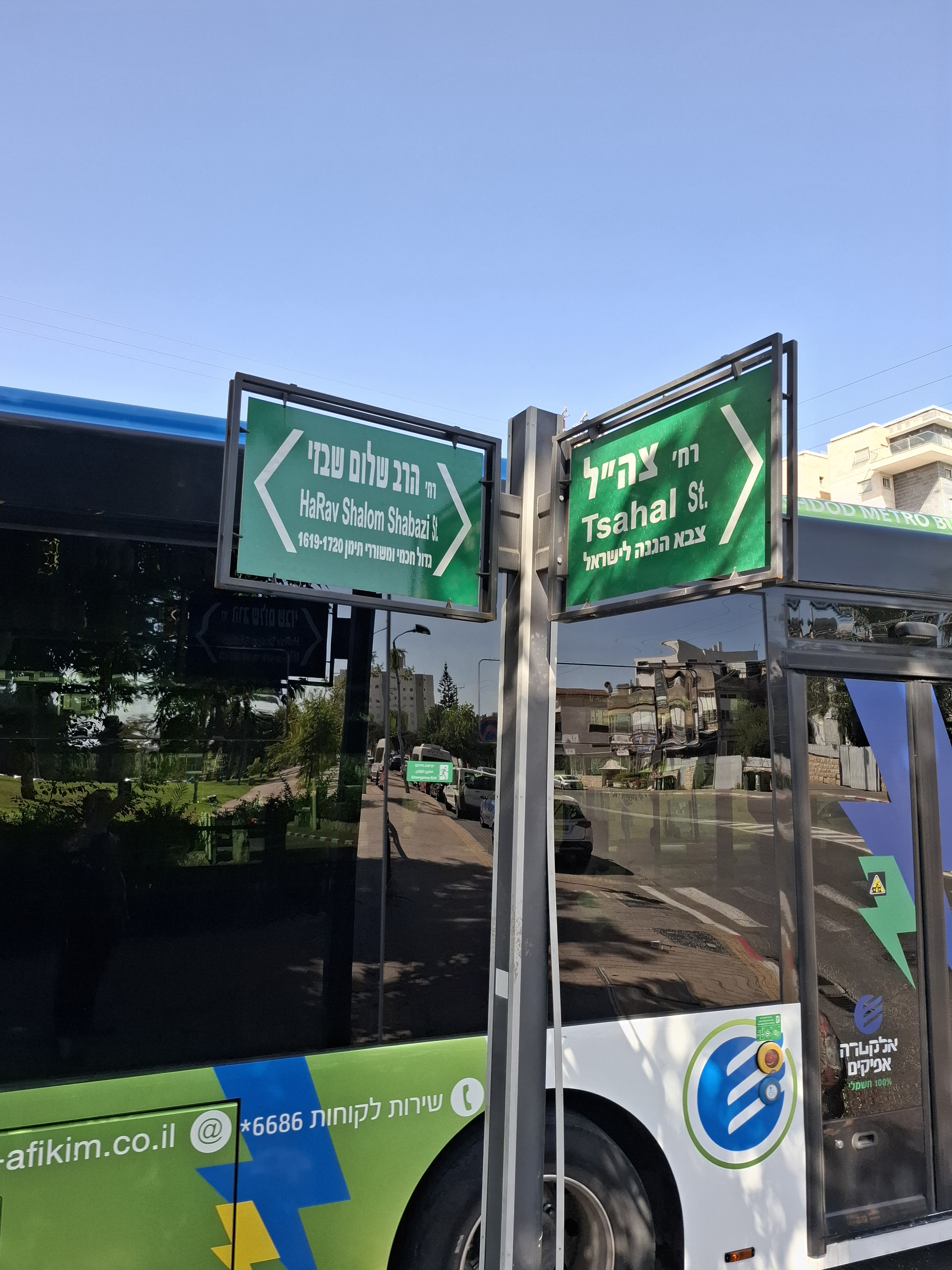
Shabazi street in Rosh HaAyin.

== In popular culture ==
Shabazi's poem "Im Nin'alu" (אם ננעלו) became a hit single sung by Israeli singer Ofra Haza whose family is of Yemenite origin, and it has also been interpreted by Yemenite singer Daklon. Other songs, such as "As'alak" (أسألك) and Ayyalath Hen, were also performed by Ofra Haza as well as Zion Golan, Aharon Amram and Shoshana Damari.

Another famous poem, "Ahavat Ra'aya Retzoni", was performed by Zohar Argov. The Israeli metal band, Orphaned Land, sang one of his poems "Olat Ha'tamid".

Today, in Israel, there are streets named after him in the Nachlaot neighborhood of Jerusalem, Neve Tzedek neighborhood of Tel Aviv and Rosh HaAyin.

== Poetry ==
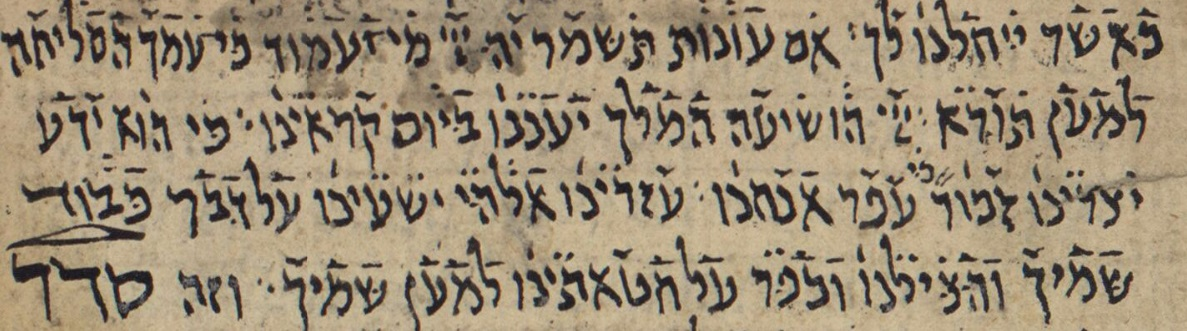
Manuscript of a Tiklal written by Rabbi Shabazi in 1986 SE (=1676 CE).

No other Yemenite Jewish poet has had the popularity and acclaim as Shalom Shabazi who wrote hundreds of poems during his lifetime, a significant amount of which songs being preserved in a song repertoire known as the Dīwān. All songs were composed in either Hebrew or Judeo-Arabic, while many songs were a combination of both languages. The style of Shabazi's Arabic poetry is similar to the contemporary Yemeni Arabic poetry of his own day.

According to Professor emeritus, Yosef Tobi, "the fundamental revolutionary change in the poetry of Yemen occurred with the work of Yosef ben Yisrael (17th century), when poetry became the primary tool for spiritual expression of Yemenite Jewry, and when the subject of exile and redemption took on vitality and had the most concrete political significance. Even more so, we find this change in the poetry of his younger relative, Shalom Shabazī."

In Shabazi's Diwan there can be found many long eschatological poems, numbered at several dozen, and which open with the words, Baraq burayq, or with compounds that are similar to them, said to be a sign of some supernatural occurrence, as one of the signs heralding the coming of the Messiah. The founder of these genres of poetic visions of redemption is Yosef ben Yisrael in whose footsteps followed many poets, including Shabazī who is said to have refined it. An example of Shabazi's sublime poetic style is seen in the following lyric although the rhyme has been lost in the translation:

May God watch from His sacred abode and smite / all the enemies of His people in the blink of an eye. Herewith God rises and stands on a plumbline [to judge the oppressors] / He shall let them drink a cup of venom, but not wine. Destroying angels shall hasten towards them, to smite / them with Heavenly arrows and with weapons of war. Turn back, O Zion, and see the consolation of your son / when Cain is given to annihilation. My Saviour, summon a day when I shall unsheathe my sword and smite / them, all that are comely and pleasant to look upon.

אם תחפצה בן איש לסודות נבחרו, תקנה לך חבר ורעים יקרו, בעבור יחי לבך ותשמח נפשך שכל והנפש בטוב יתחברו. ולבש ענוה מימי בחרותך ומאס עצת ריקים אשר יתהרו.

“If you will search, O son of man, after the choicest of all secrets, you will find that nothing surpasses that of your gaining a companion, and your endearing unto yourself friends. Such an accomplishment brings with it a quickening of heart, and gives you a real cause for rejoicing within soul. Sagacity and the elevation of the inner soul will both, on its account, be indelibly bound together for good. Moreover, put on the fine attire of humility, even from the earliest days of your youth, and reject the counsel of vain persons who have vaunted themselves.”

— Shalom Shabazi, 17th century (Note: From the liturgical poem, Im Teḥpaṣah.Diwān Efteḥah Shīr, Benei Barak 1999, pages 34-36)

Mori Shalom Shabazi is said to have written nearly 15,000 liturgical poems on nearly all topics in Judaism, of which only about 850 have survived the ravages of persecution, time and the lack of printing presses in Yemen. He wrote his Diwan (Anthology of liturgical poetry) in Judeo-Arabic, Hebrew and Aramaic. When rumors reached Yemen concerning Shabbetai Zevi in 1666, many of the Jews of Yemen were drawn after him, including Shabazī himself, even though the rabbinic court at Ṣanʻā’ had completely rejected the faith in this pseudo-Messiah. In Shabazi's poem, Adon ha-kol meḥayye kol neshama, he alludes to Shabbetai Zevi in these words: "We have heard singing from the end of the earth: / A righteous gazelle has appeared in the East and West." The “righteous gazelle” (in original Hebrew: zevi ṣaddīq) is an allusion to Shabbetai Zevi. Mori Shalom Shabazi is also said to have composed several poems concerning the Exile of Mawza (Galut Mawza), which he witnessed in his day.

=== Songs of Shabazi -- A collection of abstracts ===
זוהר פני רעיה. לבי בסוד החיה. יום הנדוֹד
אוזל חמד קריה. אוהל לתושיה. נבחר לדוֹד
ואני בתוך שביה. חשקי רְאוֹת צביה. לה אחמוֹד

“The face of my companion shines,
My heart by [her] secret was enlivened,
On [this sullen] day of wandering.

Uzal (Note: The old appellation given for the city Sanaa, and used frequently in the poetry of the Jews of Yemen.) is a delightful city!
A tent of sound-wisdom.
'Twas chosen for my beloved!

But I am in the midst of captivity.
My desire is to see the gazelle, (Note: A metaphor for the land of Israel; compare Ezekiel 20:15, which says: "…She is the gazelle of all lands," but which has been improperly translated in some English editions as, "glory of all lands.")
[Nay], I shall ever covet her!” (Note: Written by Mori Shalom Shabazi in the 17th century. These stanzas were taken from the song, אהבת צבי ברח.)

זאת הישיבה. המה באוזל מטיבה. שוהם וספיר ואחלמה

“This seat [of Jewish learning]; They are in Uzal, working good; The onyx, (Note: The Hebrew word used here is שוהם, which Rabbi Saadia Gaon in his Judeo-Arabic translation of the Pentateuch translates as בלור, meaning the precious stone, "chrysoberyl," which is also called "cat's eye." It was the stone traditionally associated with Joseph. These precious and semi-precious stones allude to the tribes of Israel, namely, the tribe of Joseph, of Issachar and of Naphtali, respectively. Cf. Numbers Rabba 2:7.) sapphire and garnet.” (Note: From the song, יא טאיר אלבאן.)

שמעתי חכמת בני אוזל
ואני בין אויבי נגזל
יקר כספי חשך ונתפרזל

“I have heard the wisdom of the sons of Uzal.
Yet, I am taken away by force amongst mine enemies.
My precious silver has turned dim, [nay], has become like unto iron!” (Note: Taken from the song, אהבת דוד עזי.)

יא משתּאק לאלעלם ואלחכּמה
זור צנעא. חית' פאצ'ת אלנעמה
פיהא אֲחבאר. תּפתּיךּ בכֻּל כּלמה

“O, he who would long for knowledge and wisdom, go visit San'a, for there [you will find] an endowment of happiness. Therein are wise men capable of answering your every question.” (Note: Mori Shalom Shabazi. Taken from the song, אהבת דוד חפצי.)
