= Shaday =

Studio album by Ofra Haza
- Released: July 18th, 1988 (Germany); August 1988 (Israel, Europe); November 1988 (US, Japan)
- Recorded: 1987–1988
- Genre: Synth-pop; mizrahi; world
- Length: 42:40
- Language: Hebrew, Arabic, English
- Label: Sire/Warner Bros. Records; 25816; Hed Arzi (Israel); Teldec/WEA Records (international)
- Producer: Izhar Ashdot; Wally Brill

Ofra Haza chronology
| Shirey Moledet 3 • Homeland Songs 3 (1987) | Shaday (1988) | Desert Wind (1989) |

Professional ratings
Review scores
| Source | Rating |
|---|---|
| AllMusic | 4.5/5 stars |
| The Rolling Stone Album Guide | 3/5 stars |

Shaday is an album by Israeli singer Ofra Haza, released in 1988. Shaday, recorded in both Tel Aviv and England, became Haza's international breakthrough album and includes the Hebrew-English language remix singles "Im Nin'alu" and "Galbi," as well as "Shaday" and "Da'Ale Da'Ale," also released as remix singles.

== Background ==
Shaday was released after the international chart success of the single "Im Nin'alu (English Mix)". Like the follow-up single "Galbi", the original version of "Im Nin'alu" was included on the 1984 album Yemenite Songs, which consisted of traditional folk songs with lyrics coming from the poetry of 16th century Rabbi Shalom Shabazi. Both tracks were released in a wide array of dance remixes both in Israel and internationally, following Eric B. & Rakim, Coldcut, M/A/R/R/S, and a number of other hip-hop and dance acts sampling Haza's voice.

The hit single "Im Nin' Alu" was preceded by a 12" remix of "Galbi" named Special Mix (Long Version and Short Version) released by the record label Globe Style. It was an underground club hit in Israel, Europe and the United States in 1985 and 1986. For the Shaday album, the track was again remixed with an arrangement similar to that of "Im Nin' Alu" and also partly re-recorded with English language lyrics and subsequently re-issued as the follow-up single in both Europe and the United States in 1988.

"Love Song," an a cappella with lyrics from the Old Testament's "Song of Songs" (8:6-7), first recorded under the Hebrew title "Azah Ka'Mavet Ahavah" (Love As Strong As Death) on the 1978 album Shir HaShirim BeSha'ashu'im (The Song Of Songs (With Fun)), has, just like the original 1984 version of "Im Nin' Alu," been sampled and remixed frequently through the 1990s and 2000s.

Two further songs on the Shaday album were English-language versions of tracks previously recorded in Hebrew: "My Aching Heart" (as "Hake'ev Haze") and "Take Me to Paradise" ("Bo Venagen Otti"), both released on the Israeli pop album Yamim Nishbarim (Broken Days) in 1986.

The US Sire Records CD release of Shaday adds the 1988 12" Sehoog Mix of "Galbi" bonus track.

== Track listing ==
1. "Im Nin'Alu" (English Mix) (Aloni, Ashdot, Shabazi) – 3:29
2. "Eshal" (Aloni, Haza) – 3:57
3. "Da'ale Da'ale" (Aloni, Haza) – 3:23
4. "My Aching Heart" (Ashdot, Barak, Haza) – 5:47
5. "Love Song" (Aloni, traditional) – 2:27
6. "Galbi" (Aloni, Amram) – 3:13
7. "Face To Face" (Aloni, Haza) – 4:52
8. "Take Me To Paradise" (Barak, Haza) – 4:48
9. "Shaday" (Aloni, Haza) – 5:40
10. "Galbi" (The Sehoog Mix) (Aloni, Haza) – 5:04

== Personnel ==
- Ofra Haza — lead vocals
- Izhar Ashdot — all instruments tracks 1 & 6, drums, bass guitar, guitar, keyboards track 2, 3, & 9, additional percussion and keyboards track 4
- Iki Levy — percussion tracks 2, 3, & 9 drums & percussion track 4
- Alon Oleartchik — strings, accordion track 2
- Ruby St James — backing vocals track 3
- Sylvia Mason-James — backing vocals track 3
- Charles Jones — bass tracks 7 & 8
- Steve Greetham — bass tracks 7 & 8
- Nick Brown — drum programming tracks 7 & 8
- Steve Goulding — drum programming tracks 7 & 8
- Chris Jarret — guitar tracks 7 & 8
- Dani Ali — keyboard programming tracks 7 & 8
- Robin Langridge — keyboard programming tracks 7 & 8
- Scott Davidson — keyboard programming tracks 7 & 8
- Jamie Talbot — saxophone tracks 7 & 8
- Gilad Atzmon — saxophone, flute, clarinet

== Production ==
- Izhar Ashdot —producer tracks 1, 2, 3, 6, 9 musical arranger tracks 2, 3, 4, 9
- Yair Nitzani—executive producer track 1
- Wally Brill—producer, engineer track 4, producer track 5, producer, engineer & sound mix tracks 7 & 8
- Bezalel Aloni—executive production and management
- Benny Nagari—arranger track 1, 6
- Bob Kraushaar—mixing track 1, 2, 3, 9
- Gil Toren—engineer track 1, 2, 3, 4, 6, 9
- Paul Wright—assistant engineer track 1
- Jeff Ward—engineer track 2, 3, 4, 9
- Gili Uriel—assistant engineer track 2, 4, 9
- Pete Frith—assistant engineer track 2, 4, 9
- Jean Christophe Vareille—assistant engineer tracks 5, 7
- Pete Schwier—engineer track 6
- Ren—assistant engineer track 6
- Mainartery London—artwork & design
- Tracks 1–3 recorded at DB Studios, Tel Aviv, Israel. Mixed at Sarm West, London, England, UK.
- Track 4 recorded at DB Studios, Tel Aviv and the Justice Room, Somerset, England. Mixed at Sarm West, London, England, UK.
- Track 5 recorded at the Justice Room, Somerset, England, UK.
- Track 6 mixed at Sarm West, London, England, UK.
- Tracks 7 & 8 recorded at the Justice Room, Somerset, England, UK.
- Track 9 recorded at DB Studios, Tel Aviv, Israel. Mixed at Sarm West, London, England, UK.

== Charts ==
| Chart (1988) | Peak position |
|---|---|
| Italy (FIMI) | 14 |
| US Billboard 200 | 130 |
| West Germany (Offizielle Deutsche Charts) | 6 |

== Certifications and sales ==
| Region | Certification | Certified units/sales |
|---|---|---|
| Italy (FIMI) | Gold | |
| Spain (Promusicae) | Platinum | 100,000^{^} |
| Switzerland (IFPI Switzerland) | Gold | 25,000^{^} |
| United States | — | 100,000 |
Summaries
| Worldwide | — | 1,000,000 |
^{^} Shipments figures based on certification alone.
