= Ofra Haza =

Israeli singer (1957–2000)

- עפרה חזה
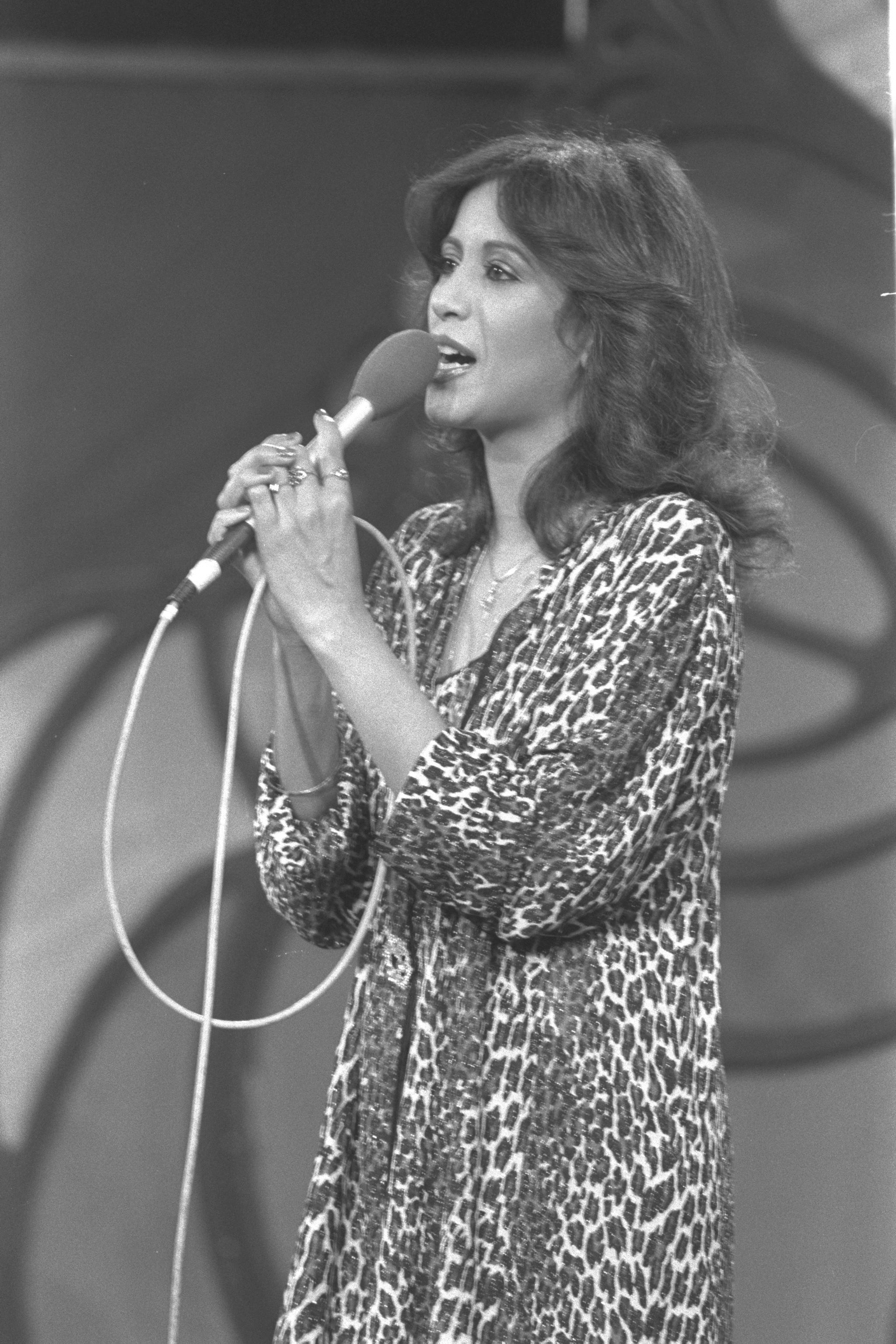
- Haza in 1981
- Born: Bat-Sheva Haza; 19 November 1957; Hatikva, Tel Aviv, Israel
- Died: 23 February 2000 (aged 42); Ramat Gan, Israel
- Cause of death: Complications from AIDS
- Resting place: Yarkon Cemetery
- Occupations: Singer; songwriter; actress
- Years active: 1969–2000
- Spouse: Doron Ashkenazi (m. 1997)
- Musical career
- Genres: World; ethnic electronica; synth-pop; soft rock; Mizrahi; Middle Eastern
- Instruments: Vocals; piano
- Labels: Hed Arzi; EastWest; Shanachie; BMG Ariola; Ausfahrt; Sire; Warner Bros
- Website: haza.co.il

Ofra Haza (Hebrew: עפרה חזה; 19 November 1957 – 23 February 2000) was an Israeli singer, songwriter, and actress, commonly known in the Western world as "the Madonna of the East", or "the Israeli Madonna". Her voice has been described as a "tender" mezzo-soprano. In 2023, Rolling Stone ranked her at number 186 on its list of the 200 Greatest Singers of All Time.

Of Yemenite-Mizrahi descent, Haza performed music known as a mixture of traditional Middle Eastern and commercial singing styles, fusing elements of Eastern and Western instrumentation, orchestration and dance-beat, as well as lyrics from Mizrahi and Jewish folk tales and poetry. By the late 1980s, Haza was an internationally successful artist, achieving large success in Europe and the Americas and appearing regularly on MTV. During her singing career, she earned many platinum and gold discs and her music proved highly popular in the club scene. By the 1990s, at the peak of her career, she was regularly featured in movie soundtracks, such as that of Dick Tracy (1990) and famously in The Prince of Egypt (1998), and her vocals were popularly sampled in hip-hop. Her death in 2000 from an AIDS-related illness shocked Israeli society.

Haza was a highly influential cultural figure in Israel, and is considered one of the country's biggest cultural icons, who helped popularize Mizrahi culture.

== Early life ==
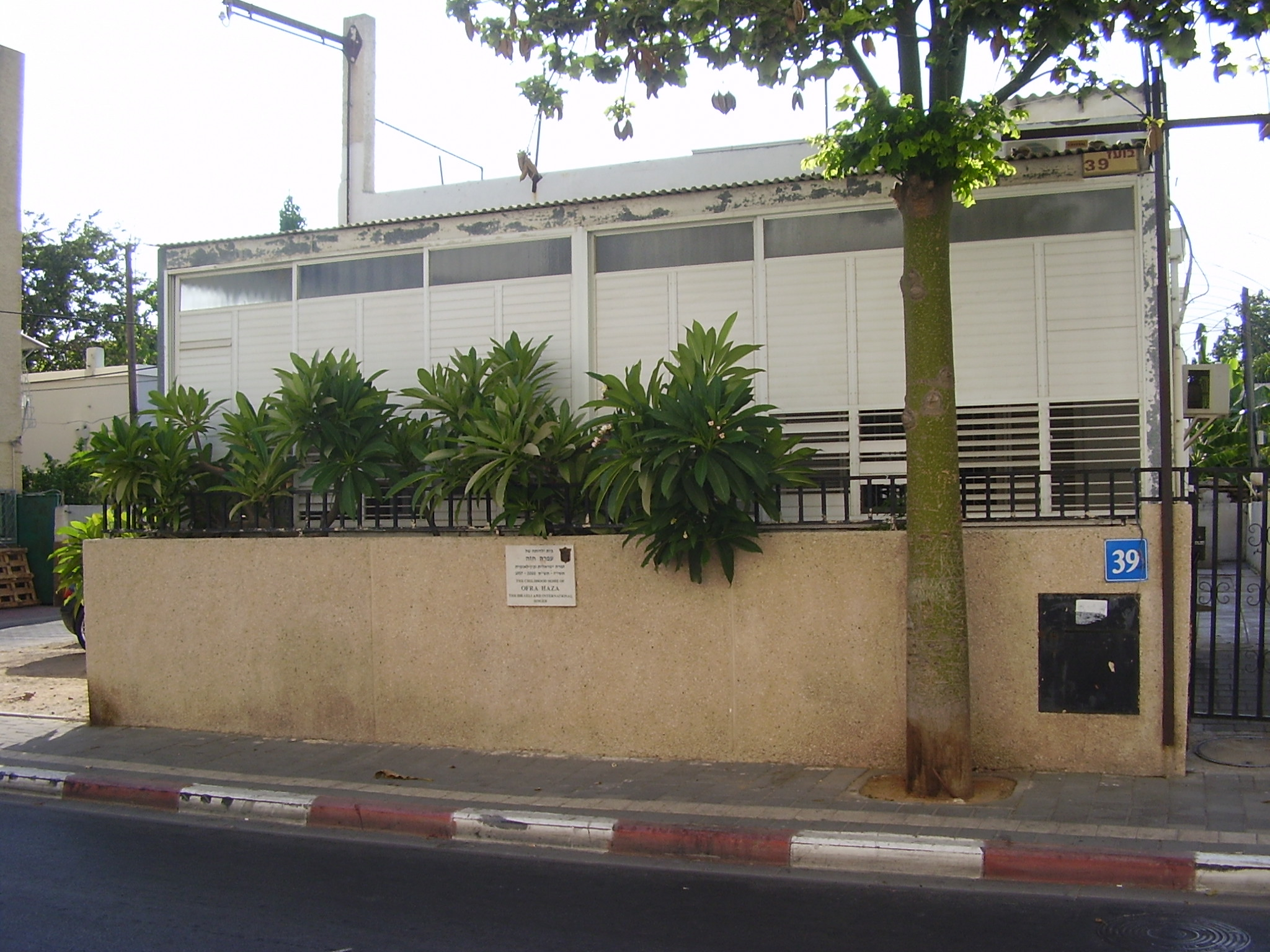
Ofra Haza's birth house in Tel Aviv

Bat-Sheva Ofra Haza was born on 19 November 1957 in Tel Aviv, Israel, to Mizrahi Jewish parents from Yemen who had emigrated to Israel in 1949 with eight children. She was the youngest of nine children (six sisters and two brothers) born to Yefet and Shoshana Haza. They were raised in a Masorti household in the Hatikva Quarter, then an impoverished, working-class area of Tel Aviv. Although named Bat-Sheva by her parents, her sisters disliked the name, and preferred to call her by her middle name, Ofra, instead.

Haza's earliest musical influences included her learning traditional Yemenite songs from her parents; Haza's mother in particular, Shoshana, proved a major influence on her musical direction. Shoshana had been a professional singer in Yemen and often performed at family celebrations, with Haza also recalling her mother singing to her children from an early age. Additionally early influences in her music came from Israeli folk songs, the Beatles, and Elvis Presley.

Haza herself began to exhibit a similar musical inclination to that of her mother, and began singing at an early age, including at local weddings and as a soloist in her school choir. At the age of 12, Haza joined a local protest theatre troupe, named “Hatikva” (The Hope) which had been recently founded by a neighbour of hers, Bezalel Aloni. Haza soon emerged as one of the most gifted performers in the troupe, and manager Bezalel Aloni soon noticed her singing talent. He featured her at the front of stage in many of his productions, and later became her manager and mentor. At the age of 19, she was Israel's foremost pop star, and news articles have retrospectively described her as "the Madonna of the East".

Haza served two years in the Israel Defense Forces (IDF).

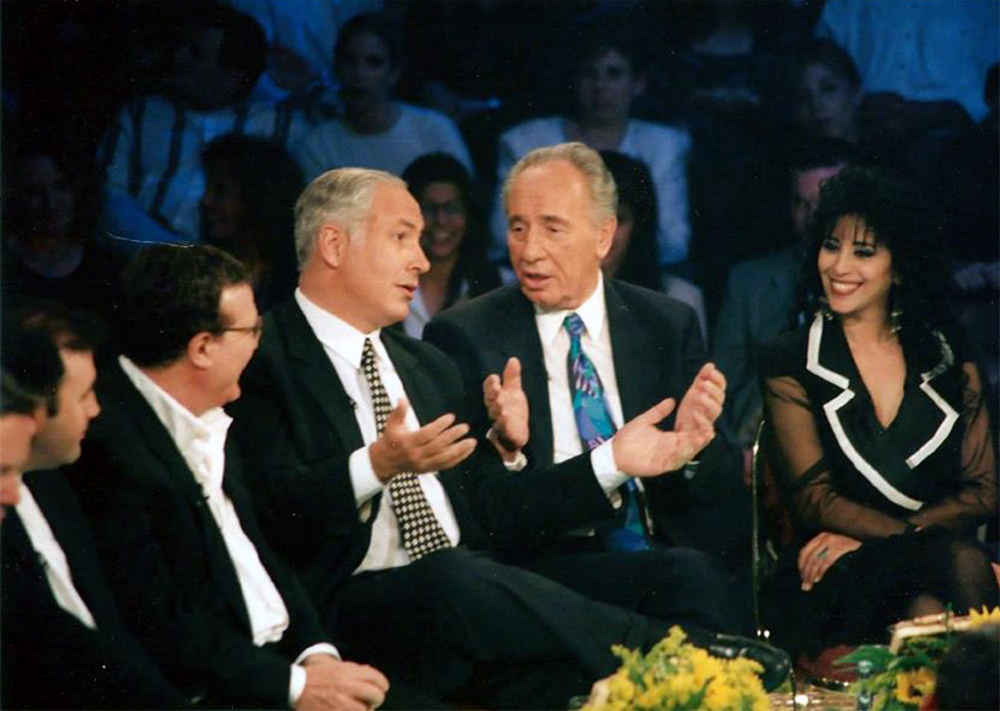
Ofra Haza on Dan Shilon's show, with Shimon Peres, Benjamin Netanyahu and Yehoram Gaon, 1995

== International artist ==
She represented Israel in the Eurovision Song Contest 1983, with the song "Chai", finishing second with 136 points. Her major international breakthrough came in the wake of the album Shirei Teiman ("Yemenite songs"), which she recorded in 1984. The album consisted of songs that Haza had heard in childhood, using arrangements that combined authentic Middle Eastern percussion with classical instruments. Further recognition came with the single "Im Nin'alu", taken from the album Shaday (1988), which won the New Music Award for Best International Album of the Year. The song topped the Eurochart for two weeks in June that year and was on heavy rotation on MTV channels across the continent. In the annals of classical hip-hop this song would be extensively re-released, re-mixed and sampled, for example on Coldcut's remix of Eric B. & Rakim's "Paid in Full". The single reached the UK top twenty and became a dance floor favorite across Europe and the US, topping the German charts for nine weeks. Subsequent singles were also given the dance-beat / MTV-style video treatment, most notably, Galbi, Daw Da Hiya and Mata Hari, but none quite matched the runaway success of her first hit. In May 1990, Haza performed at the World Music Awards in Monaco, where she received an award for World's Best-Selling Israeli Artist. Im Nin'alu would go on to be featured on an in-game radio playlist of the video game Grand Theft Auto: Liberty City Stories, released in 2005 and featured on Panjabi MC's album "Indian Timing" in 2009.

Haza also received critical acclaim for the albums Fifty Gates of Wisdom (1984), Desert Wind (1989), Kirya (1992) and Ofra Haza (1997).

In 1992, Kirya (co-produced by Don Was) received a Grammy nomination.

In 1994, Haza released her first Hebrew album in seven years, Kol Haneshama ("The Whole Soul"). Though not an initial chart success, the album produced one of her biggest hits to date, Le'orech Hayam ("Along The Sea"), written by Ayala Asherov. The song did not have any substantial chart success upon its release to radio but became an anthem after Haza performed it on the assembly in memorial to deceased Prime Minister Yitzhak Rabin, a week after he was assassinated. Radio stations around the country began to play it. Its lyrics became even more symbolic following Haza's own death in 2000.

== Collaborations and performances ==
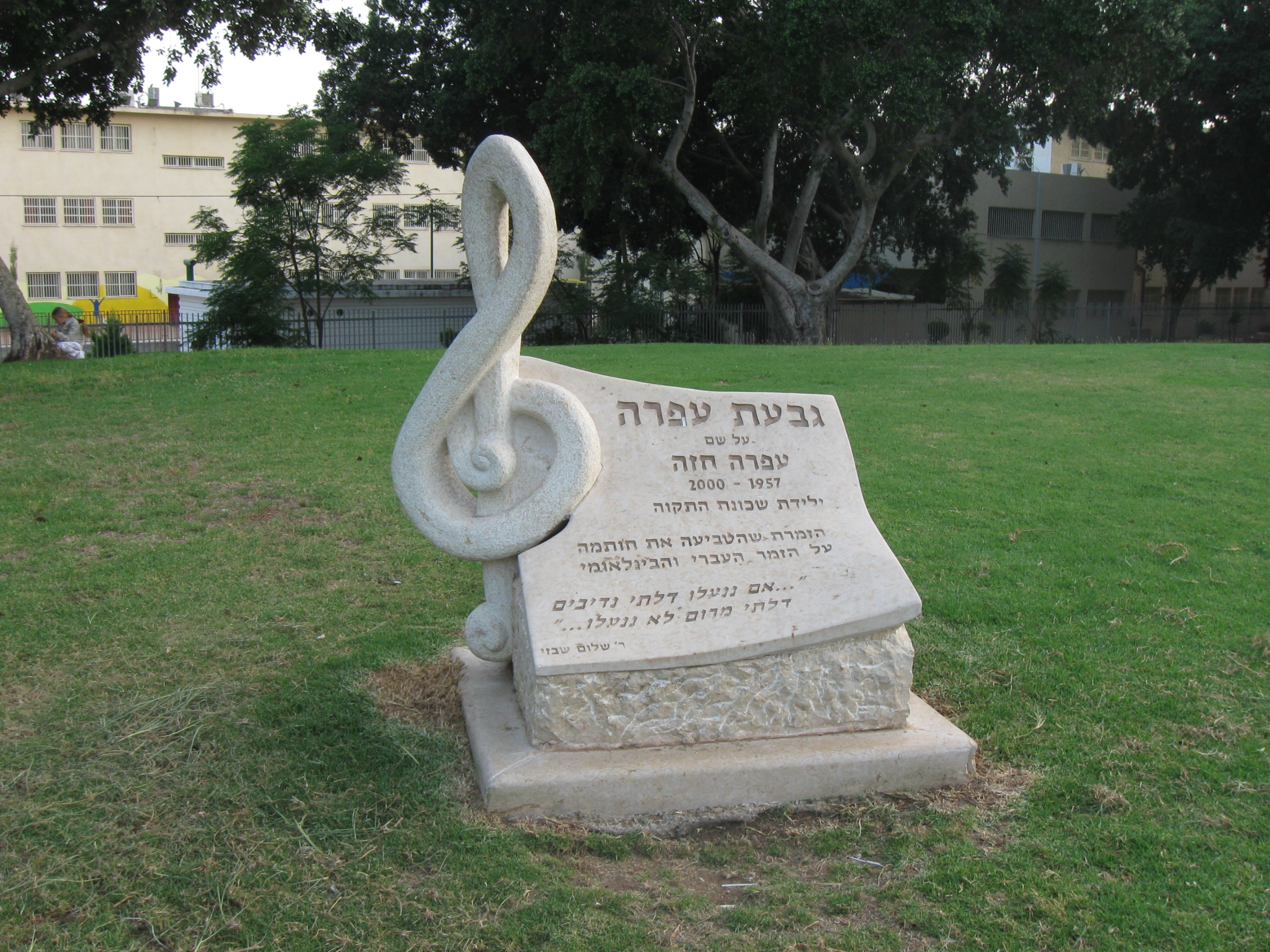
A memorial to Ofra Haza in the Hatikva Quarter garden, Tel Aviv

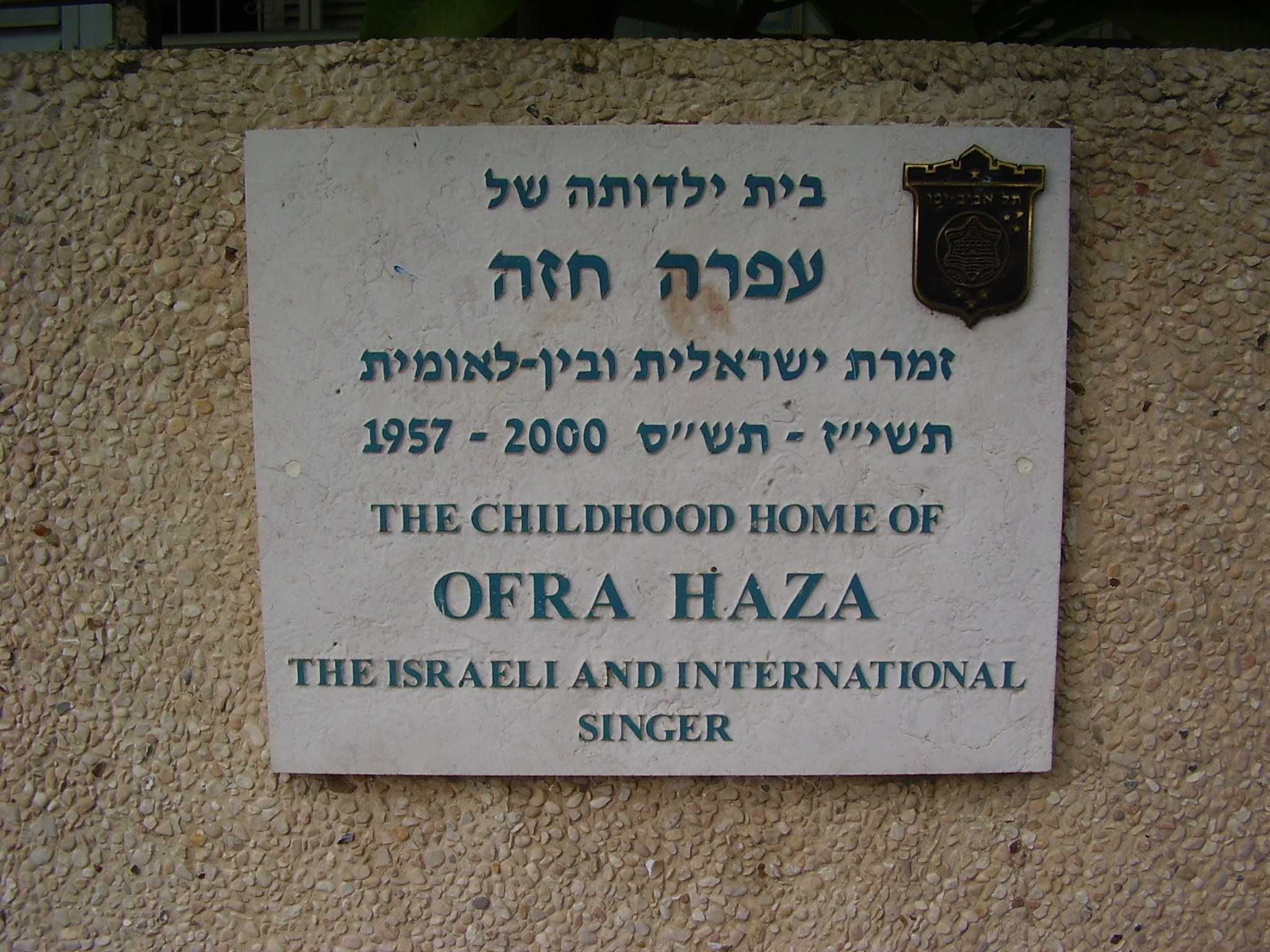
Memorial plaque in memory of Ofra Haza at her childhood home in 39 Boaz Street, Tel Aviv.

Her collaborative work with internationally established acts included the single "Temple of Love (Touched by the Hand of Ofra Haza)", recorded with The Sisters of Mercy in 1992. Thomas Dolby co-produced Yemenite Songs and Desert Wind, on which he was also a guest musician. Haza guested on Dolby's album Astronauts And Heretics (1992), singing on the track "That's Why People Fall in Love". She recorded "My Love Is for Real" with Paula Abdul in 1995 and on Sarah Brightman's album Harem, Haza's vocals were included on "Mysterious Days", thanks to an idea by Brightman's partner Frank Peterson (ex-Enigma), who produced both Harem (2003) and the album Ofra Haza (1997). Haza also sang backing vocals on the song "Friend of Stars" by the German electro-pop band And One, from the Spot (1993) album.

For the Kirya album, Iggy Pop, a friend of Don Was, performed the narration on "Daw Da Hiya" and Haza joined him and a host of other stars for the video and single release "Give Peace A Chance" in 1991. She also sang on the soundtracks of Colors (1988), Dick Tracy (1990), Wild Orchid (1990), Queen Margot (1994) and The Prince of Egypt (1998). For Dick Tracy, it was Madonna, who also participated in the movie, that wanted Ofra Haza to record for the movie's soundtrack and encouraged her to do so. Madonna would go on to sample Haza's 1988 hit, Im Nin'alu, in her song Isaac from the album Confessions on a Dance Floor (2005).

Haza in 1997

In The Prince of Egypt, she voiced the character Yocheved, singing "Deliver Us". When composer Hans Zimmer, who was working with Haza on the music for The Prince of Egypt, introduced her to the film's character designers and animators, they thought she was so beautiful that they drew Yocheved to look like the singer. For the film's soundtrack, Haza sang the song "Deliver Us" in 19 languages, about half of which were sung phonetically, including:

- Czech — "Tak vyveď nás"
- Dutch — "Verlos ons, Heer"
- English — "Deliver Us"
- Finnish — "Johdata"
- French — "Délivre nous"
- German — "Erlöse uns"
- Greek — "Eleftheri"
- Hebrew — "Hoshia Na"
- Hungarian — "Szabadíts"
- Italian — "Ascoltaci"
- Norwegian — "Befri Oss"
- Polish — "Uwolnij nas"
- Portuguese — "Liberte-nos"
- Romanian — "Izbăvește-ne"
- Slovak — "Vysloboď nás"
- Spanish — "Libéranos"
- Swedish — "Befria Oss"

On the soundtrack of The Governess (1998), Haza is the featured singer on seven of the twelve tracks and worked closely with film music composer Edward Shearmur. In 1999, she performed (together with late Pakistani artist Nusrat Fateh Ali Khan) the track "Forgiveness", on the contemporary symphony album The Prayer Cycle by Jonathan Elias. As a featured background vocalist, Haza's voice has been recorded, re-mixed or sampled for Black Dog's "Babylon" single, Eric B and Rakim's "Paid in Full (Coldcut Remix)", "Temple of Love (1992)" by The Sisters of Mercy, and for the M/A/R/R/S hit "Pump Up The Volume". The single "Love Song" has been re-mixed by DJs many times, its powerful vocal performance and comparatively sparse musical arrangement making it the perfect vehicle for a dance-rhythm accompaniment.

Covers of songs by other artists included the Carole King/James Taylor song "You've Got a Friend", Madonna's "Open Your Heart", Gary Moore's "Separate Ways", and Led Zeppelin's "Kashmir".

There were many live performances and Haza spoke with fond memories of her visits to Japan and Turkey. She performed at the 1994 Nobel Peace Prize ceremony in Oslo, where she appeared alongside Irish singer Sinéad O'Connor. "Paint Box" was written specially for the event. Her 1990 live recording, Ofra Haza at Montreux Jazz Festival was released in 1998.

Haza shared duets and concert performances with Glykeria, Yehudit Ravitz, Paul Anka, Paula Abdul, Michael Jackson, Iggy Pop, Hoite, Buddha Bar, Ishtar, Gidi Gov, Whitney Houston, Tzvika Pick, Khaled, Prachim Yerushalaim, The Sisters of Mercy, Thomas Dolby, Stefan Waggershausen, Eric B and Rakim, Gila Miniha, Hans Zimmer, Hagashash Hachiver, Yaffa Yarkoni, Dana International, Shoshana Damari and posthumously with Sarah Brightman.

In late 1999, Haza recorded new material for a new album that she worked on with Ron Aviv, a music producer from Petah Tikva. At the time, she also worked with the Finnish violinist Linda Brava, who released a previously unreleased track called Tarab on her MySpace page on 14 May 2010. On the track, Haza sings in English, Arabic and Hebrew, while Brava plays the electric violin. The track is possibly Haza's last recording.

In 2023, Israeli producers teamed up in creating a collaboration between Haza and Zohar Argov, another famous deceased Israeli singer known as "The king of Mizrahi music". The song "Kan Le Olam" ("Here Forever") was created through artificial intelligence. The song was released on 13 April 2023 and, according to the Israeli Broadcasting Corporation, is "the first song in the Hebrew language whose voices have been reproduced using artificial intelligence technology. The song was produced in honor of the 75th Independence Day of the State of Israel at the initiative of the Israel Broadcasting Corporation here by the Session 42 company."

== Marriage ==
On 15 July 1997, Haza married businessman Doron Ashkenazi. The couple had no children, but Ashkenazi had an adopted son, Shai, and a biological daughter from his first marriage.

== Death ==
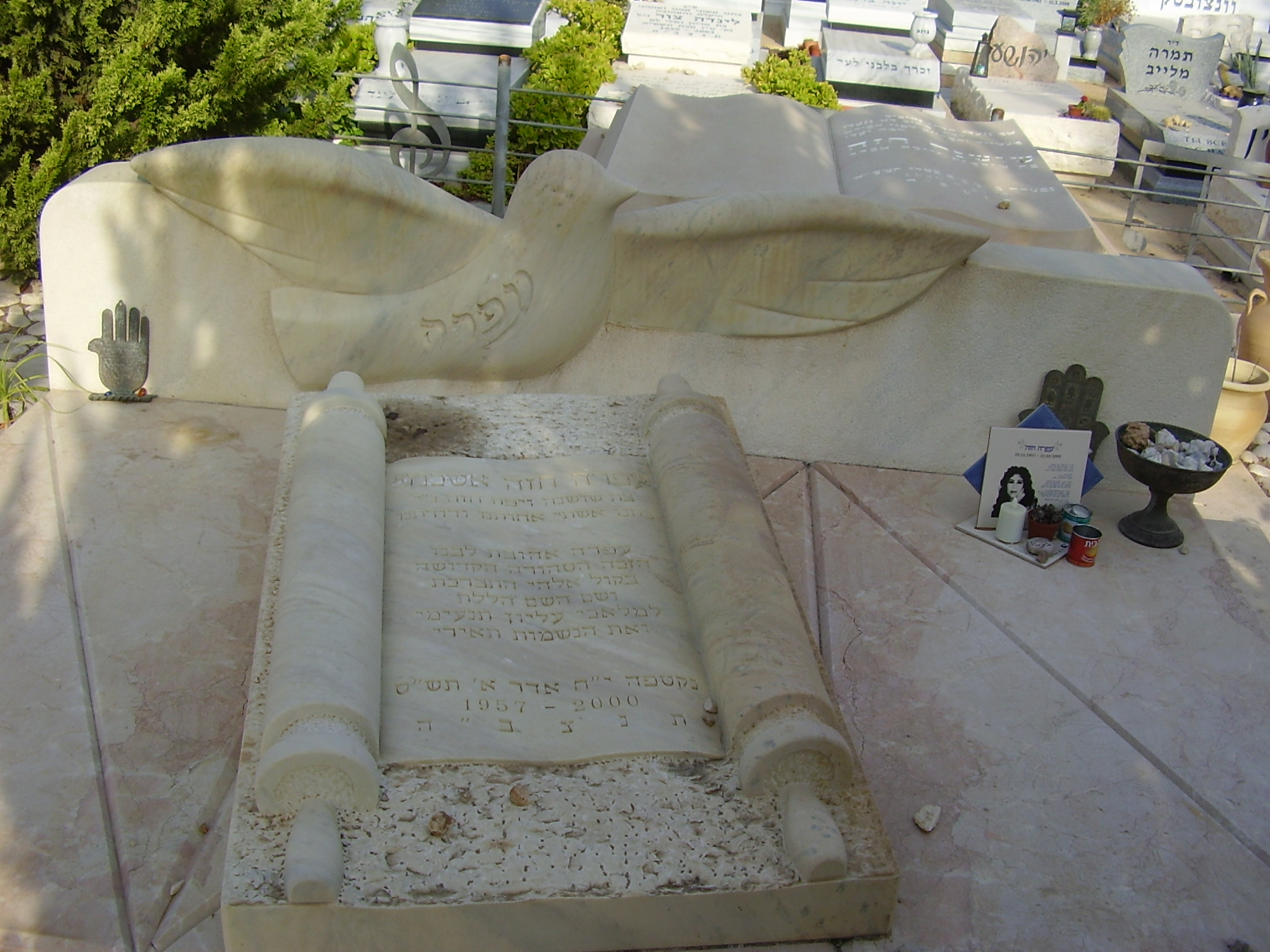
Ofra Haza's grave in Yarkon Cemetery

Ofra Haza died on 23 February 2000, at the age of 42, of AIDS-related complications. Her HIV-positive diagnosis is now generally known, but the decision by the Israeli newspaper Haaretz to report it shortly after her death was controversial in Israel.

After Haza's death was announced, Israeli radio stations played non-stop retrospectives of her music. Then-Prime Minister Ehud Barak praised her work as a cultural emissary, commenting that she also represented the Israeli success story — "Ofra emerged from the Hatikvah slums to reach the peak of Israeli culture. She has left a mark on us all."

Haza's death from an AIDS-related illness added another layer to the public mourning, bringing the disease into the spotlight. The revelation of Haza's illness caused much surprise among fans, along with debate about whether the media invaded her privacy by reporting it; Haza had hidden the disease even from the Tel Aviv hospital workers who first treated her in an emergency room two weeks prior. The managing director of Haaretz, Yoel Esteron, commented at the time:

There is hardly a house in Israel in which the word AIDS did not get spoken in recent days [...] And in these circumstances to continue not to publish is to publish something that is not true. Ofra Haza was a public figure, and to a certain extent public property in her life. In her death it is impossible to leave this chapter in darkness. We are talking about a human disease like any other, and there is no reason to demonize it.

The Health Minister spokesman Yoram Malca said:

There was a consensus to keep silent, even after her death. I think today Haaretz broke all the norms and ethical and moral standards that we still have in this country. I think that it's a person's right to guard his privacy. What do we have left in life, or after our deaths, if not that little bit of knowledge that we can live and die with dignity?

There was also speculation about how she had acquired the virus. Immediately after her death, the media placed blame on her husband, Tel Aviv businessman Doron Ashkenazi, for infecting her with the disease. Haza's manager Bezalel Aloni supported this belief, writing in his book that Haza acquired AIDS through sex with her husband. Later, it was alleged that her husband claimed that Haza became infected because of a blood transfusion she received in a Turkish hospital following a miscarriage. Ashkenazi himself died of a drug overdose roughly one year later on 7 April 2001, leaving a daughter from a prior marriage and a 14-year-old adopted son, Shai Ashkenazi.

Doctors who treated AIDS patients were reportedly "horrified" after learning of Haza's decision to hide her illness. Zvi Bentwich, head of the AIDS Center at the Kaplan Medical Center in Rehovot, commented:

It brings us back to the beginning of the epidemic with the near-demonization and stigmatization of a disease that actually we are dealing with much better. [...] And in this unfortunate case, without having all the details, it appears that Ofra Haza almost died of the embarrassment, from the terrible fear to reveal her illness.

Haza is buried in the Artists section of Yarkon Cemetery in Petah Tikva.

== Legacy and commemoration ==
Bezalel Aloni, Haza's manager and producer of 28 years, published a book Michtavim L'Ofra (Letters to Ofra) in 2007. The book is partly Aloni's autobiography and partly a biography of Haza, and includes letters written by Aloni.

On 22 March 2007, on the seventh anniversary of her death, the Tel Aviv-Yafo Municipality and the Tel Aviv Development Fund renamed part of the public park in the Hatikva Quarter Gan Ofra (Ofra's Park) in her honor. The park is placed at the end of Bo'az street, in which Haza's childhood home stood. The park features a children's playground, symbolizing her love for children and the old quarter she grew up in and always came back to.

On 22 April 2009, the Israeli Stamp Service issued a series of 12 postal stamps on the subject of Israeli music. One of the stamps in this collection was dedicated in memory of Haza. The stamp, with a portrait of Haza, was designed by the artist Miri Nestor Sofer. The stamp's tab included a line from Haza's hit song "Tfila" (Prayer) - "Give as light and joy of youth".

On 19 November 2014, Google celebrated what would have been her 57th birthday with a Google Doodle. Pakistani blogger Sarmad Iqbal who is known for his pro-peace stance, praised Ofra Haza enthusiastically in his blog post titled A Pakistani's love letter to Israeli pop music and cinema for The Times of Israel in 2017. Sarmad wrote "She was more than just a cultural icon of Israel as she also tried to bridge the wide gap between Israel and her Arab neighbors as her songs spread to a wider Middle-Eastern audience defying all the barriers to peace and friendship between Arabs and Israel."

In the 2005 video game Grand Theft Auto: Liberty City Stories, her track "Im Nin'Alu" is featured in a fictional radio station which plays Middle Eastern and Indian music.

Tributes

- Touched By the Hand of Ofra Haza Fanzine (2008–09) was a tribute fanzine.
- Sharim Ofra (Singing Ofra) 2002 – A tribute concert to commemorate the life of Ofra Haza where Israeli singers sang Haza's songs.
- Fulfilled Wish is a digital EP by Russian ambient- and downtempo duo Koan, released in 2007.

Documentaries

- Life & Death of Ofra Haza (2002) – Aired on the Israeli channel 2, 29 January 2002. This documentary in Hebrew focuses on Haza's entire life and career until her death.
- Sodot (Secrets) (2005) – Aired on Israeli channel YES, this documentary in Hebrew and partly English is about Haza's life and attempts to answer questions surrounding her death.
- Dokoceleb Ofra Haza (2007) – Aired on the Israeli entertainment station HOT, 22 February 2007. This documentary in Hebrew focuses on Haza's career, achievements and marriage.
- Lost Treasure of Ofra Haza (2010) – Aired on the Israeli channel 10, 22 February 2010. This documentary in Hebrew and partly English focuses on Haza's legacy.

== Discography ==
=== Albums ===
Studio albums

- 1974: Ahava Rishona • First Love (with Shechunat Hatikvah Workshop Theatre)
- 1976: Vehutz Mizeh Hakol Beseder • Apart from that All Is OK (with Shechunat Hatikvah Workshop Theatre)
- 1977: Atik Noshan • Ancient Old (with Shechunat Hatikvah Workshop Theatre)
- 1977: BeShir HaShirim Besha'ashu'im • The Song of Songs (with Fun)
- 1980: Al Ahavot Shelanu • About Our Loves
- 1981: Bo Nedaber • Let's Talk
- 1982: Pituyim • Temptations
- 1982: Li-yeladim • Songs for Children (children's album)
- 1983: Hai • Alive
- 1983: Shirey Moledet • Homeland Songs
- 1984: Bayt Ham • A Place for Me
- 1984: Yemenite Songs • Shiri Teyman (aka Fifty Gates of Wisdom)
- 1985: Adamah • Earth
- 1985: Shirey Moledet 2 • Homeland Songs 2
- 1986: Yamim Nishbarim • Broken Days
- 1987: Shirey Moledet 3 • Homeland Songs 3
- 1988: Shaday
- 1989: Desert Wind
- 1992: Kirya
- 1994: Kol Haneshama • My Soul
- 1995: Queen in Exile
- 1997: Ofra Haza

Live albums

- 1998: Ofra Haza at Montreux Jazz Festival

Compilations

- 1983: Selected Hits (with Shechunat Hatikvah Workshop Theatre)
- 1986: Album HaZahav • Golden Album
- 2000: Manginat Halev Vol. 1 • Melody of the Heart Vol. 1
- 2004: Manginat Halev Vol. 2 • Melody of the Heart Vol. 2
- 2008: Forever Ofra Haza (remix album)

=== Singles ===
Year	Single	Peak positions												Album
Year	Single	UK	IRE	NED	BEL (FLA)	FRA	ITA	GER	AUT	SWI	SWE	NOR	US Dance	Album
1981	"Tfila"	—	—	—	—	—	—	—	—	—	—	—	—	Bo nedaber
1988	"Galbi"	—	—	—	—	—	—	—	—	—	—	—	—	Shaday
1988	"Im Nin'alu"	15	16	29	14	6	23	1	2	1	2	1	15	Shaday
1988	"Galbi" (reissue)	—	—	—	—	—	8	20	19	21	—	—	15	Shaday
1988	"Shaday"	—	—	—	—	—	—	—	—	—	—	—	—	Shaday
1989	"Eshal" (ITA only)	—	—	—	—	—	43	—	—	—	—	—	—	Shaday
1989	"Wish Me Luck"	—	—	—	—	—	22	—	—	—	—	—	—	Desert Wind
1989	"I Want to Fly" (JAP only)	—	—	—	—	—	—	—	—	—	—	—	—	Desert Wind
1990	"Ya Ba Ye"	—	—	—	—	—	—	—	—	—	—	—	20	Desert Wind
1990	"Fatamorgana"	—	—	—	—	—	—	—	—	—	—	—	—	Desert Wind
1991	"Today I'll Pray (Oggi Un Dio Non Ho)" (from Sanremo – ITA only)	—	—	—	—	—	—	—	—	—	—	—	—	single only
1992	"Daw Da Hiya"	—	—	—	—	—	—	—	—	—	—	—	—	Kirya
1992	"Innocent – A Requiem for Refugees"	—	—	—	—	—	—	—	—	—	—	—	—	Kirya
1994	"Elo Hi"	—	—	—	—	—	—	—	—	—	—	—	—	La Reine Margot OST
1995	"Mata Hari"	—	—	—	—	—	—	—	—	—	—	—	—	singles only
1996	"Love Song"	—	—	—	—	—	—	—	—	—	—	—	—	singles only
1997	"Show Me"	—	—	—	—	—	—	—	—	—	—	—	—	Ofra Haza
1998	"Give Me a Sign"	—	—	—	—	—	—	—	—	—	—	—	—	Ofra Haza
"—" denotes releases that did not chart or were not released.

=== Soundtracks ===
- 1988: Colors
- 1990: Wild Orchid
- 1994: La Reine Margot (Queen Margot)
- 1998: The Prince of Egypt
- 1998: The Governess
- 1999: The King And I (Hebrew version)
- 2000: American Psycho: Music from the Controversial Motion Picture

== See also ==
- List of Israeli musical artists
- List of mezzo-sopranos in non-classical music
- Honorific nicknames in popular music

Awards and achievements
Preceded by Avi Toledano with Hora	Israel in the Eurovision Song Contest; 1983	Succeeded by Izhar Cohen with Olé, Olé
