= List of wineries in Virginia =

Following is an incomplete list of wineries and vineyards in Virginia, United States. As of 2019 there are over 250 registered vineyards and wineries in the state.

== Wineries and vineyards ==
Following is an incomplete list of wineries and vineyards in Virginia.

Name	Established	Location	County	American Viticultural Area	References
2 Witches Winery and Brewing Co	2014	Danville	Independent city		
7 Lady Vineyards	2019	Manakin Sabot	Goochland		
8 Chains North Winery		Waterford	Loudoun	Middleburg Virginia AVA	
12 Ridges Vineyard	2019	Vesuvius	Rockbridge		
50 West Vineyards		Middleburg	Loudoun	Middleburg Virginia AVA	
868 Estate Vineyards	2012	Hillsboro	Loudoun	Middleburg Virginia AVA	
Abingdon Vineyards		Abingdon	Washington		
Above Ground Winery	2010	Middlebrook	Augusta	Shenandoah Valley AVA	
Afton Mountain Vineyards	1978	Afton	Albemarle, Nelson		
Altillo Vineyards and Winery		Hurt	Pittsylvania		(Note: Formerly Altillo Vineyards and Winery.)
American Way Country Wines	1979	Chase City	Mecklenburg		
Ankida Ridge Vineyards	2010	Amherst	Amherst		
Arterra Wines	2015	Delaplane	Fauquier		
Aspen Dale Winery at the Barn	2009	Delaplane	Fauquier		
Ashton Creek Vineyard	2016	Chester	Chesterfield		
Bacchus Winery		Fredericksburg	Independent city	Northern Neck George Washington Birthplace AVA	
Backporch Vineyard	2019	King George	King George	Northern Neck George Washington Birthplace AVA	
Barboursville Vineyards	1976	Barboursville	Orange	Monticello AVA	
Barn at 678		Barboursville	Orange	Monticello AVA	
Barrel Oak Winery	2006	Delaplane	Fauquier		
Barren Ridge Vineyards		Fishersvile	Augusta	Shenandoah Valley AVA	
Beliveau Farm Winery		Blacksburg	Montgomery	North Fork of Roanoke AVA	
Black Heath Meadery		Richmond	Independent city	Northern Neck George Washington Birthplace AVA	
Blacksnake Meadery		Dugspur	Carroll		
Blenheim Vineyards	2000	Charlottesville	Albemarle	Monticello AVA	
Bloxom Vineyard	2020	Bloxom	Accomack	Virginia's Eastern Shore AVA	
Blue Quartz Winery		Etlan	Madison		
Blue Ridge Vineyard		Eagle Rock	Botetourt	Shenandoah Valley AVA	
Blue Valley Vineyard and Winery	2015	Delaplane	Fauquier	Shenandoah Valley AVA	
Bluestone Vineyard		Bridgewater	Rockingham	Shenandoah Valley AVA	
Bluemont Vineyard	2007	Bluemont	Loudoun	Middleburg Virginia AVA	
Bluestone Vineyard	2003	Bridgewater	Rockingham	Shenandoah Valley AVA	
Bogati Winery	2000	Round Hill	Loudoun	Middleburg Virginia AVA	
Boxwood Estate Winery		Middleburg	Loudoun	Middleburg Virginia AVA	
Bozzo Family Vineyards		Purcellville	Loudoun	Middleburg Virginia AVA	
Breaux Vineyards	1997	Purcellville	Loudoun	Middleburg Virginia AVA	
Breezy Hill Meadworks	2019	Smithfield	Isle of Wight		
Brent Manor Vineyards		Faber	Nelson	Monticello AVA	
Briede Vineyards	2013	Winchester	Independent city	Shenandoah Valley AVA	
Bright Meadows Farm		Nathalie	Halifax		
Brix & Columns Vineyards		McGaheysville	Rockingham	Shenandoah Valley AVA	
Brooks Mill Winery		Wirtz	Franklin		
Burnbrae Vineyards		Forest	Bedford		
Burnley Vineyards		Barboursville	Orange	Monticello AVA	
Byrd Cellars	2005	Goochland	Goochland		
Cana Vineyards and Winery of Middleburg		Middleburg	Loudoun	Middleburg Virginia AVA	
Capitol Vineyards		Delaplane	Fauquier		
Capstone Vineyards		Linden	Fauquier, Warren		
Cardinal Point Vineyard & Winery		Afton	Nelson	Montecello AVA	
Caret Cellars	2014	Caret	Essex		
Carriage House Wineworks	2020	Waterford	Loudoun	Middleburg Virginia AVA	
Casanel Vineyards & Winery	2008	Leesburg	Loudoun	Middleburg Virginia AVA	
Castle Glen Winery		Doswell	Hanover		
Castle Gruen Vineyards and Winery	2008	Locust Dale	Madison		
Cave Ridge Vineyard		Mount Jackson	Shenandoah	Shenandoah Valley AVA	
Chapelle Charlemagne Vineyards	1995	Flint Hill	Rappahannock		
Chateau MerrillAnne		Orange	Orange	Monticello AVA	
Chateau Morrisette Winery	1980	Floyd	Floyd	Rocky Knob AVA	
Chateau O'Brien at Northpoint		Markham	Fauquier		
Chatham Vineyards on Church Creek		Machipongo	Northampton	Virginia's Eastern Shore AVA	
Chester Gap Cellars		Front Royal	Rappahannock		
Chestnut Oak Vineyard		Barboursville	Orange	Monticello AVA	
Chisholm Vineyards at Adventure Farm		Earlysville	Albemarle	Monticello AVA	
Chiswell Farm and Winery		Greenwood	Albemarle	Monticello AVA	
Chrysalis Vineyards at The Ag District		Middleburg	Loudoun	Middleburg Virginia AVA	
Cobbler Mountain Cellars		Delaplane	Fauquier		
Cooper Vineyards	1999-2005	Louisa	Louisa		(Note: The business was registered as 53rd Farm Winery and did business as Cooper Vineyards from July 1999 to July 2015, when it was sold and became Fifty-Third Winery and Vineyard.)
Corcoran Vineyards & Cider	2004	Waterford	Loudoun	Middleburg Virginia AVA	
Creek's Edge Winery		Lovettsville	Loudoun	Middleburg Virginia AVA	
CrossKeys Vineyards	2008	Mount Crawford	Rockingham	Shenandoah Valley AVA	
Crushed Cellars		Purcellville	Loudoun	Middleburg Virginia AVA	
Cunningham Creek Winery		Palmyra	Fluvanna	Monticello AVA	
Delaplane Cellars		Delaplane	Fauquier		
Daring Wine & Cider Company		Rural Retreat	Wythe		
Delaplane Cellars		Delaplane	Fauquier		
DeVault Family Vineyards		Concord	Campbell		
Domaine Fortier Vineyards		Lovettsville	Loudoun	Middleburg Virginia AVA	
Doukénie Winery	1983	Hillsboro	Loudoun	Middleburg Virginia AVA	
Dry Mill Vineyards & Winery		Leesburg	Loudoun	Middleburg Virginia AVA	
DuCard Vineyards		Etlan	Madison		
Eagletree Farm Vineyards		Leesburg	Loudoun	Middleburg Virginia AVA	
Early Mountain Vineyards		Madison	Madison		
Eastwood Farm and Winery		Charlottesville	Albemarle	Monticello AVA	
Ecco Adesso Vineyards		Fairfield	Rockbridge	Shenandoah Valley AVA	
Eden Try Estate and Winery		Fredericksburg			
Effingham Manor & Winery		Nokesville	Prince William		
Elk Island Winery		Goochland	Goochland		
Endhardt Vineyards		Purcellville	Loudoun	Middleburg Virginia AVA	
Fabbioli Cellars		Leesburg	Loudoun	Middleburg Virginia AVA	
Fables & Feathers Winery	2021	Goodview	Bedford		
Fifty-Third Winery and Vineyard	1999	Louisa	Louisa		(Note: The business was registered as 53rd Farm Winery and did business as Cooper Vineyards from July 1999 to July 2015, when it was purchased by its current owners.)
Firefly Cellars		Hamilton	Loudoun	Middleburg Virginia AVA	
Fleetwood Farm Winery		Leesburg	Loudoun	Middleburg Virginia AVA	
Flying Fox Vineyard		Afton	Albemarle, Nelson		
Fox Meadow Vineyards & Winery		Linden	Fauquier, Warren		
Gabriele Rausse Winery		Charlottesville	Albemarle	Monticello AVA	
Gadino Cellars		Washington	Rappahannock		
Garden Grove Brewing & Urban Winery		Richmond	Independent city		
Gauthier Vineyard		Barhamsville	New Kent	Virginia Peninsula AVA	
General's Ridge Vineyard		Hague	Westmoreland	Northern Neck George Washington Birthplace AVA	
Glass House Winery		Free Union	Albemarle	Monticello AVA	
Glen Manor Vineyards		Front Royal	Warren		
Good Luck Cellars		Kilmarnock	Lancaster	Northern Neck George Washington Birthplace AVA	
Good Spirit Farm		Round Hill	Loudoun	Middleburg Virginia AVA	
Grace Estate Winery		Crozet, Virginia	Albemarle	Monticello AVA	
Graham Ordinary Lodge and Meadery		Bedford	Bedford		
Granite Heights Winery		Warrenton	Fauquier		
Gray Ghost Vineyards		Amissville	Rappahannock		
Grayhaven Winery		Gum Spring	Louisa		
Great Valley Farm Winery	2016	Natural Bridge	Rockbridge		
Greenhill Vineyards	2013	Middleburg	Loudoun	Middleburg Virginia AVA	
Hamlet Vineyards	2010	Bassett	Henry		
Hampton Roads Winery	2008	Elberon	Surry		
Hardware Hills Vineyard	2021	Scottsville	Fluvanna		
Hark Vineyards	2019	Earlysville	Albemarle	Monticello AVA	
Haunted Vineyards Winery		Jetersville	Amelia		
Hazy Mountain Vineyards & Brewery	2019	Afton	Nelson	Monticello AVA	
Hickory Hill Vineyards	1984	Moneta	Bedford		
Hidden Brook Winery	1998	Leesburg	Loudoun	Middleburg Virginia AVA	
Hiddencroft Vineyards		Lovettsville	Loudoun	Middleburg Virginia AVA	
Hill Top Winery & Meadery	1998	Nellysford	Nelson	Monticello AVA	
Hillsborough Winery, Brewery & Vineyard		Hillsboro	Loudoun	Middleburg Virginia AVA	
Honah Lee Vineyard	1992	Gordonsville	Orange	Montecello AVA	
Horton Vineyards	1983	Gordonsville	Orange	Montecello AVA	
Hunting Creek Vineyards	2002	Clover	Halifax		
Hunt's Vineyard	2009	Stuarts Draft	Augusta	Shenandoah Valley AVA	
Ingleside Vineyards	1980	Oak Grove	Westmoreland	Northern Neck George Washington Birthplace AVA	
Iron Heart Winery	2016	Allisonia	Pulaski		
Jacey Vineyards		Wicomico Church	Northumberland		
James Charles Winery & Vineyard	2015	Winchester		Shenandoah Valley AVA	
James River Cellars Winery	2001	Glen Allen	Henrico		
JBR Vineyards & Winery	2014	Pearisburg	Giles		
Jefferson Vineyards	1984	Charlottesville	Albemarle	Monticello AVA	
Jolene Family Winery		Quinton	New Kent	Virginia Peninsula AVA	
Jump Mountain Vineyard	2012	Rockbridge Baths	Rockbridge	Shenandoah Valley AVA	
Kalero Vineyard	2015	Purcellville	Loudoun	Middleburg Virginia AVA	
Keswick Vineyards	2000	Keswick	Albemarle	Monticello AVA	
Kilaurwen Winery	2009–2021	Stanardsville	Greene		
King Family Vineyards	1998	Crozet	Albemarle	Monticello AVA	
Kluge Estate Winery and Vineyard	1999–2011	Charlottesville	Albemarle	Monticello AVA	(Note: The Kluge Estate Winery and Vineyard was purchased by Donald Trump in 2011 and is now Trump Winery.)
Knight's Gambit Vineyard	2003	Charlottesville	Albemarle	Monticello AVA	
Lake Anna Winery	1989	Spotsylvania	Spotsylvania		
Lazy Days Winery	2007	Amherst	Amherst		
Leo Grande Vineyards & Winery	1997–2024	Goode	Bedford		
Lexington Valley Vineyard	1999	Rockbridge Baths	Rockbridge	Shenandoah Valley AVA	
Lightwell Survey	2015	Waynesboro	Augusta	Shenandoah Valley AVA	
Linden Vineyards	1987	Linden	Fauquier		
Little Washington Winery and Skyline Brewing		Washington	Rappahannock		
Loving Cup Vineyard & Winery		North Garden	Albemarle	Monticello AVA	
Lovingston Winery	2003	Lovingston	Nelson	Monticello AVA	
Marceline Vineyards				Shenandoah Valley AVA	
Meredyth Vineyards	1972	Middlesburg	Loudoun	Middleburg Virginia AVA	
Miracle Valley Vineyard		Delaplane	Fauquier		
Monticello Wine Company	1873–1916	Charlottesville	Albemarle	Monticello AVA	
Morais Vineyards & Winery	2011	Bealeton	Fauquier		
Muse Vineyards				Shenandoah Valley AVA	
North Mountain Vineyard & Winery				Shenandoah Valley AVA	
Old Hill Cidery				Shenandoah Valley AVA	
Ox-Eye Vineyards				Shenandoah Valley AVA	
Potomac Point Winery					
RdV Vineyards		Delaplane	Fauquier		
Rockbridge Vineyard				Shenandoah Valley AVA	
Shenandoah Vineyards				Shenandoah Valley AVA	
Third Hill Winery at DeMello Vineyards		Quicksburg	Shenandoah	Shenandoah Valley AVA	
Three Fox Vineyards		Delaplane	Fauquier		
Trump Winery	2011	Charlottesville	Albemarle	Monticello AVA	
Valerie Hill Vineyard & Winery					
Valhalla Vineyards	1994	Roanoke	Roanoke	North Fork of Roanoke AVA	
Veramar Vineyard				Shenandoah Valley AVA	
Veritas Vineyard and Winery		Afton		Montecello AVA	
Williamsburg Winery	1985	Williamsburg			
Windy Meadow Vineyard		Free Union			
Winery at Kindred Pointe,				Shenandoah Valley AVA	
Wisteria Farm & Vineyard				Shenandoah Valley AVA	
Wolf Gap Vineyard				Shenandoah Valley AVA	

== See also ==
- Virginia wine
