= Culture of Virginia =

Human culture

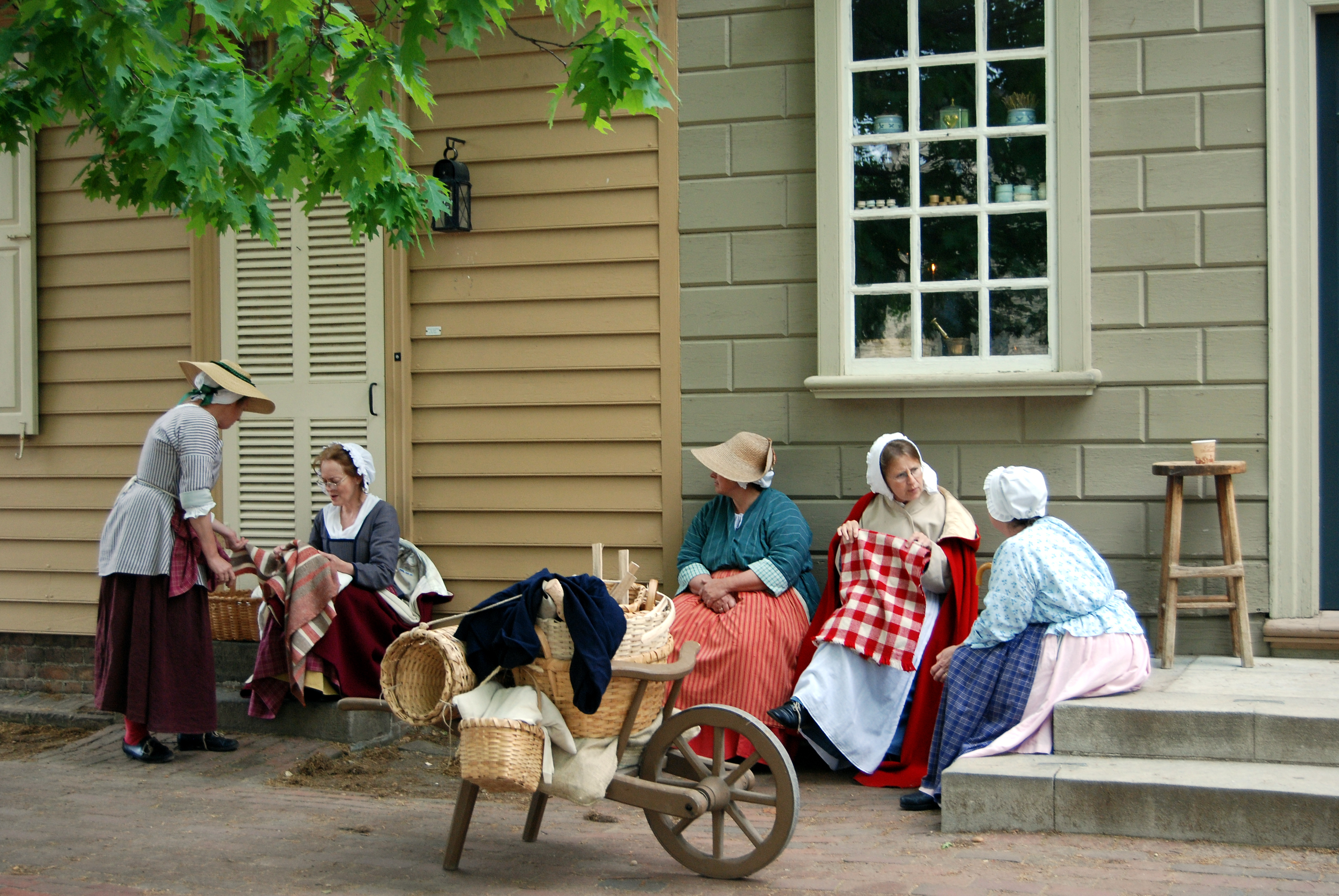
Colonial Virginian culture, language, and style is reenacted in Williamsburg.

The Culture of Virginia refers to the distinct human activities and values that take place in or originate from the Commonwealth of Virginia. Virginia's historic culture was popularized and spread across America by Washington, Jefferson, and Madison, and their homes represent Virginia as the birthplace of America. Modern Virginia culture is largely part of the culture of the Southern United States, however, Northern Virginia has become increasingly similar in culture to the Northeastern United States within the past few decades. Virginia is influenced by Native American culture.

== Regional aspects ==
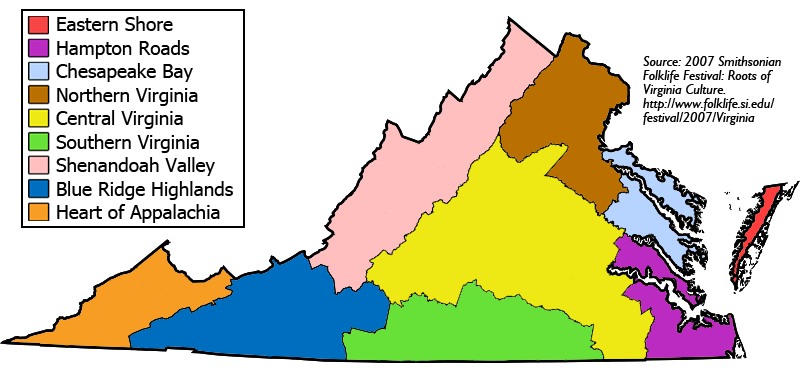
Map of nine Virginia cultural regions

The Smithsonian Institution divides Virginia into nine cultural regions.

- Eastern Shore
- Hampton Roads
- Chesapeake Bay
- Northern Virginia
- Central Virginia
- Southern Virginia
- Shenandoah Valley
- Blue Ridge Highlands
- Heart of Appalachia

== Language ==
English was passed as the commonwealth's official language by statutes in 1981 and again in 1996, though the status is not mandated by the Constitution of Virginia. English is the only language spoken by 6,245,517 (86.7%) Virginians, though it is spoken very well by an additional 570,638 (7.9%) for a total of 94.6% of the Commonwealth which speaks English. Spanish has the most speakers of other languages, with 424,381 (5.9%). 226,911 (3.2%) speak Asian and Pacific Islander languages, including Vietnamese and Filipino.

The Piedmont region is one of the most famous for its dialect's strong influence on Southern American English. Various accents are also present including the Tidewater accent and the anachronistic Elizabethan of Tangier Island, as well as a more homogenized American English in urban areas with a great deal of transplants.

== Cuisine ==
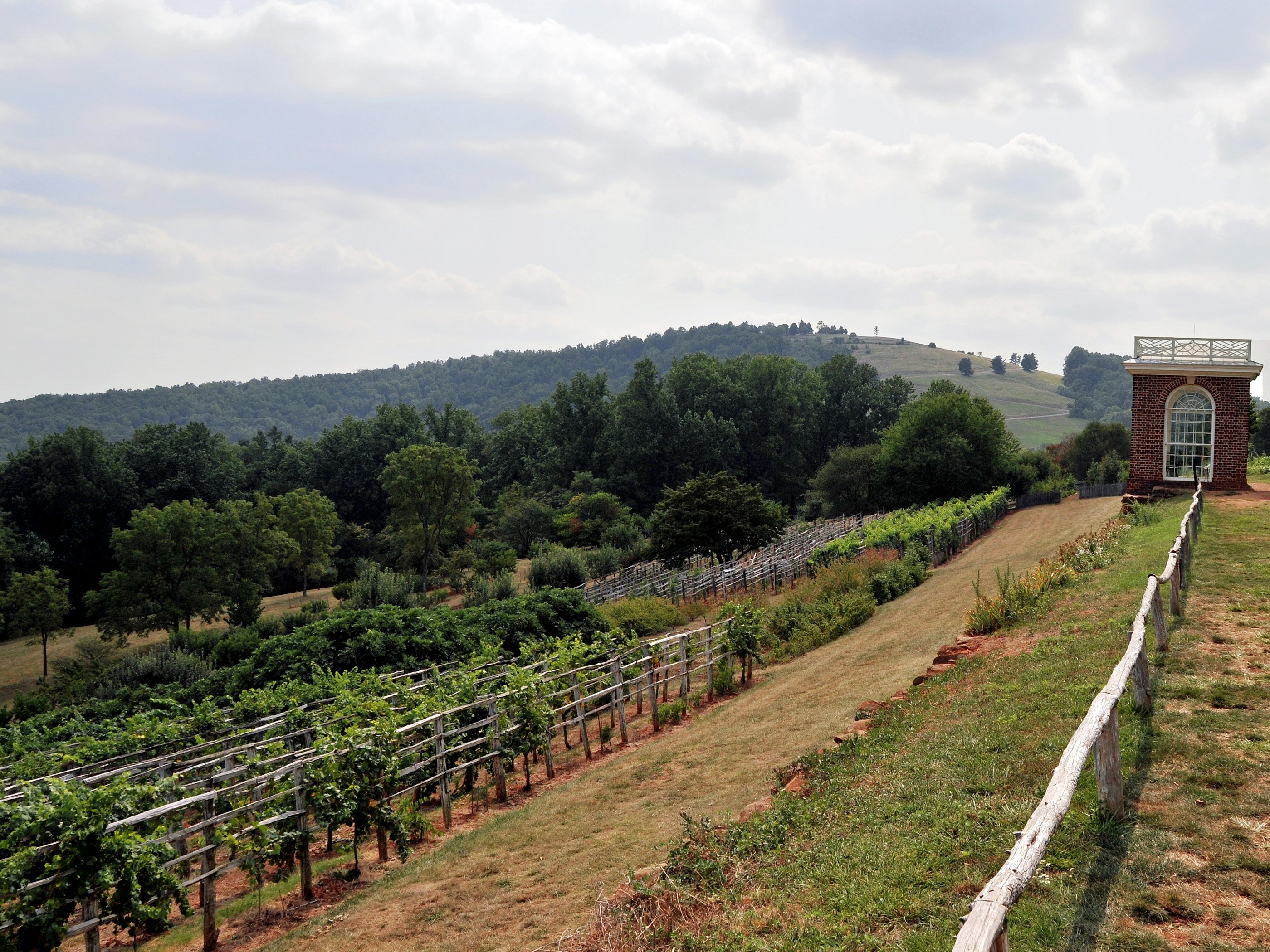
The vineyard at Thomas Jefferson's Monticello home did not produce wine until the late 20th century.

Besides the general cuisine of the Southern United States, Virginia maintains its own particular traditions. Smithfield ham, sometimes called Virginia ham, is a type of country ham which is protected by state law, and can only be produced in the town of Smithfield.

Barbecue in Virginia is similar to barbecue in North Carolina. It is mostly pork with a vinegar-based sauce, ranging from almost all vinegar in the east spiced with red pepper flakes, to a vinegar-based sauce that has some tomato and a bit of sweetness to it the further west one goes.

Marble cake originated in Rockingham County, Virginia from a Mennonite community. Shoofly pie is popular in the Shenandoah Valley and was brought to that area from the Pennsylvania Dutch. Fried peaches, cut in half and simmered in butter with brown sugar melted in their hollows, and served with vanilla ice cream, is a more upscale dessert found in Virginia.

Sausage, both link and patties, and usually flavored with sage, constitutes an important aspect to a traditional Virginian breakfast. Virginia is also well known for its peanuts which are prepared by either roasting or boiling them. A traditional Virginian dish is peanut soup which has been present in the cuisine since the colonial era. Historically, Greengage plums were common in Virginian cuisine, but their cultivation has been in decline since the eighteenth century, although it can still be found in Virginia occasionally. Instead Damson plums are more often found in Virginian cuisine. It is often used in jams, jellies, preserves, and desserts.

Brunswick stew is a traditional and common dish in Virginia, a type of thick vegetable stew with meat. The traditional meat was the Appalachian flying squirrel, but this has since become endangered and chicken and rabbit are often used in current times. Virginians insist that this stew, common in most parts of the south, was invented in Brunswick County, Virginia, whereas Georgians insist it was Brunswick, Georgia.

In the Western half, apples are important to the local cuisine, especially for apple butter and cider. Winesap apples are commonly grown and used in Virginia, whereas in most other American locales they have fallen out of favor. Seafood is important to the coastal areas, such as oysters, blue crabs, bay clams, blue fish, bay scallops, haddock, shad, and shad roe in the Spring. Blue crabs are prepared in many ways such as crab cakes, crab imperial, soft-shelled in season, or simply plain crab meat that is picked from its shell and dipped in melted butter. Oyster and spinach soup is a traditional New Year's Eve dish in Virginia, although currently in decline. A common seasoning for seafood is Old Bay spice mix, which is based on traditional spices historically used in the Chesapeake region. Black walnuts also have a place in the traditional cuisine, often used in desserts.

Virginia wine is made in many parts of the state. As of 2007, the state has 2,400 acres (9.7 km^{2}) under cultivation, an increase of 14% over the prior year. 5,600 tons were harvested in 2007, a 10% decline from 2006, the majority of which was Vinifera. The entire year's crop was valued at $7,800,000. The state ranks eighth in the nation for both bearing acreage and grape production. There are six subregions in Virginia: Monticello AVA, North Fork of Roanoke AVA, Northern Neck George Washington Birthplace AVA, Rocky Knob AVA, Shenandoah Valley AVA, Virginia's Eastern Shore AVA.

== Arts ==
=== Fine arts ===
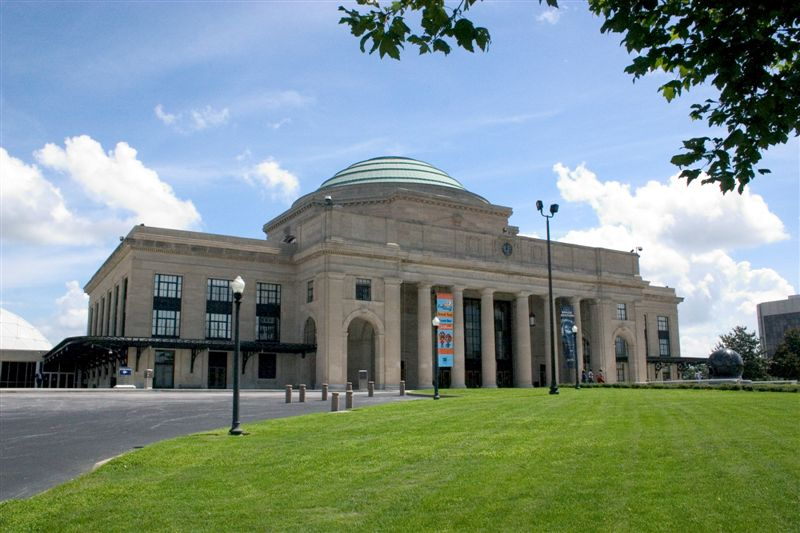
The Science Museum of Virginia is one of the popular museums in Richmond, Virginia.

The Virginia Foundation for the Humanities works to improve commonwealth's civic, cultural, and intellectual life, while the Virginia Commission for the Arts administers fine arts grants and maintains rosters of touring and visiting artists who can be booked for arts programming. The Virginia Museum of Fine Arts is a state-funded museum with the largest collection of Fabergé eggs outside of Russia. The Chrysler Museum of Art is home to many pieces, stemming from the Chrysler family collection, including the final sculpture of Gian Lorenzo Bernini. There are regional museums as well, such as the southwestern Virginia Piedmont Arts Association of the visual and performing arts in Martinsville, Virginia, and the Taubman Museum of Art in Roanoke, Virginia, both of which also support local art history and artists. Other museums include the popular Science Museum of Virginia, the Steven F. Udvar-Hazy Center, the National Museum of the Marine Corps, the Frontier Culture Museum, the Virginia Museum of Natural History and the Mariners' Museum. Virginia Commonwealth University is the number one public art school in the United States.

Besides these sites, many open-air museums and battlefields are located in the state, such as Historic Jamestowne, Colonial Williamsburg, Richmond National Battlefield, Manassas National Battlefield Park, Appomattox Court House National Historical Park and Fredericksburg and Spotsylvania National Military Park.

=== Music and performance art ===
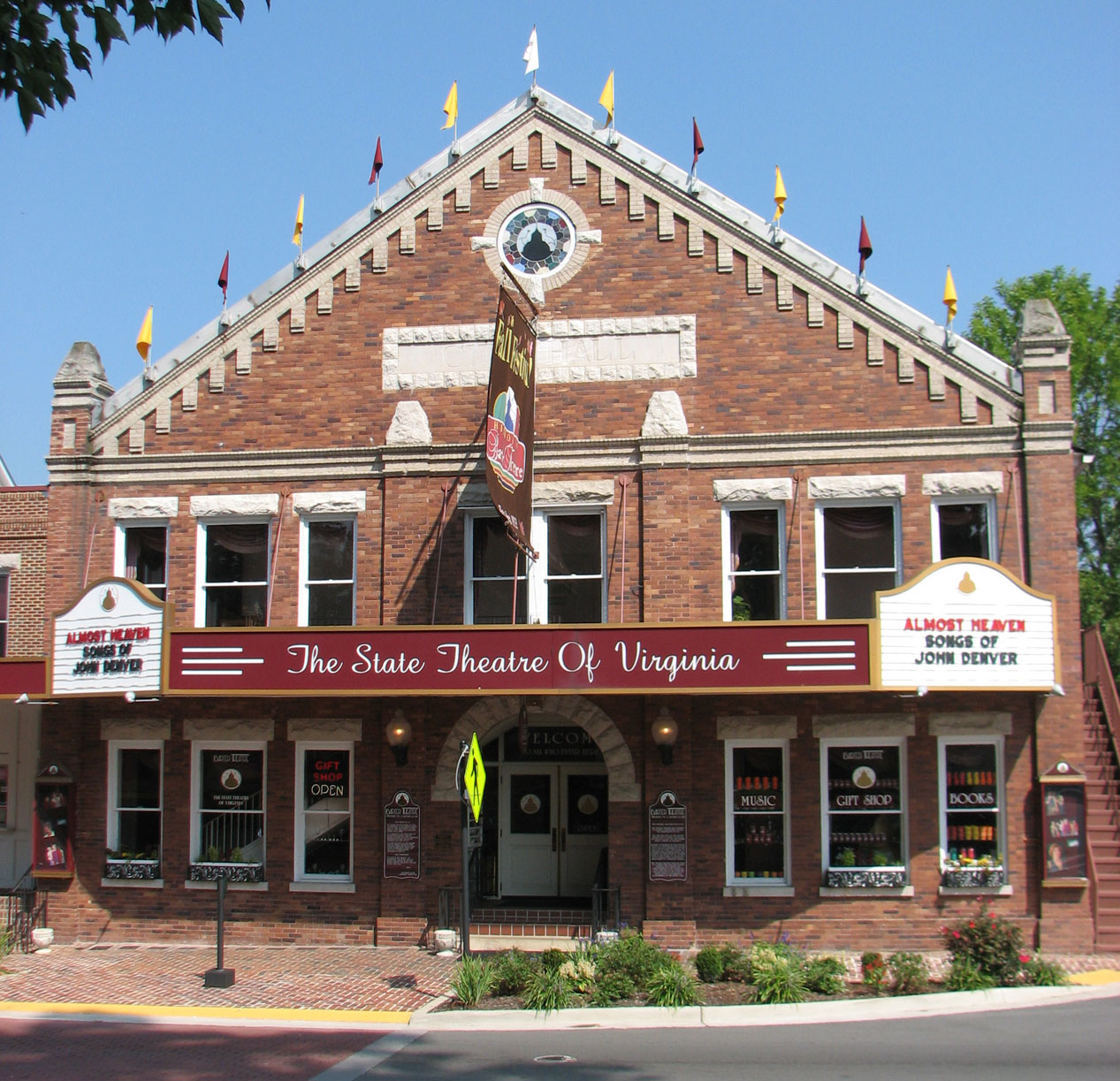
The Barter Theatre in Abingdon, Virginia, opened in 1933.

Virginia has launched many award-winning traditional music artists as well as internationally successful popular music acts. Ralph Stanley, Patsy Cline, the Statler Brothers and the Carter Family are award-winning bluegrass and country musicians from Virginia, and Ella Fitzgerald and Pearl Bailey were both from Newport News. Hip hop and rhythm and blues acts like Missy Elliott, Timbaland, The Neptunes, Chris Brown, and Clipse hail from the commonwealth. The Neptunes produced 43% of all songs on American radio in 2003. Singer-songwriters from Virginia include Jason Mraz and jam bands like Bruce Hornsby, Keller Williams, and Dave Matthews Band, who continue their strong charitable connection to Charlottesville, Virginia. Influential stage-rock group Gwar also began at Virginia Commonwealth University.

Notable performance venues include the Birchmere, Jiffy Lube Live, the Norva Theatre, the Patriot Center, and the Verizon Wireless Virginia Beach Amphitheater. Wolf Trap National Park for the Performing Arts is located in Vienna and is the only national park intended for use as a performing arts center. Wolf Trap hosts the Wolf Trap Opera Company, which produces an opera festival every summer. The Harrison Opera House in Norfolk is home to the official Virginia Opera. The Virginia Symphony Orchestra is based in Hampton Roads.

The American Shakespeare Center is located in Staunton, and home to resident and touring theater troupes. Other notable theaters include the Ferguson Center for the Arts, the Barter Theatre, and the Landmark Theater. Richmond's Theatre IV, The Children's Theatre of Virginia, ranks as the second largest children's theatre in the nation. The company tours to elementary schools around the country while producing lavish main stage productions at the historic Empire Theatre. Virginia is also home to Barksdale Theatre, the nation's first dinner theatre. Barksdale still operates both at The Shops at Willow Lawn in Richmond, as well as the historic Hanover Tavern in Hanover.

Academy Award winners Warren Beatty, Sandra Bullock, Shirley MacLaine, and George C. Scott hail from the state, as does Wanda Sykes.

In August 2023, singer Oliver Anthony released to the internet a song called "Rich Men North of Richmond" which became an overnight viral success. The song prominently featured Richmond, VA in its lyrics, and was both praised, as well as criticized, by critics from both the political right and left.

=== Literature ===
Literature in Virginia often deals with the state's extensive, and sometimes troubled, past. The works of Pulitzer Prize winner Ellen Glasgow often dealt with social inequalities and the role of women in her culture. Glasgow's peer and close friend James Branch Cabell wrote extensively about the changing position of gentry in the Reconstruction era, and challenged its moral code with Jurgen, A Comedy of Justice. William Styron approached history in works such as The Confessions of Nat Turner and Sophie's Choice. Tom Wolfe has occasionally dealt with his southern heritage in bestsellers like I Am Charlotte Simmons. Mount Vernon native Matt Bondurant received critical acclaim for his historic novel The Wettest County in the World about moonshiners in Franklin County during prohibition. Virginia also names a state Poet Laureate, currently Ron Smith, whose term began on July 1, 2014.

=== Architecture ===
Virginia furniture and architecture are typical of American colonial architecture. Thomas Jefferson and many of the state's early leaders favored the Neoclassical architecture style, leading to its use for important state buildings. The Pennsylvania Dutch and their style can also be found in parts of the state.

== Festivals ==
Celebrate Fairfax! is one of many county sponsored events across Virginia.

Many counties and localities host county fairs and festivals. The State Fair of Virginia was held at the Richmond International Raceway every September until the 2008. The fair is now held at the Meadow Event Park in Doswell, Virginia. The September Neptune Festival in Virginia Beach celebrates the city, the waterfront, and regional artists. Norfolk's Harborfest, in June, features boat racing and air shows. Fairfax County also sponsors Celebrate Fairfax! with popular and traditional music performances. The Virginia Lake Festival is held during the third weekend in July in Clarksville. In Amherst they celebrate Uncle Billy's Day . Other food festivals are held around the state.

On the Eastern Shore island of Chincoteague the annual Pony Swim & Auction of feral Chincoteague ponies at the end of July is a unique local tradition expanded into a week-long carnival. The Shenandoah Apple Blossom Festival is a six-day festival held annually in Winchester that includes parades and bluegrass concerts. From 2005 to 2007, Richmond was host of the National Folk Festival. The Northern Virginia Fine Arts Festival is held on a May weekend in Reston.

Two important film festivals, the Virginia Film Festival and the VCU French Film Festival, are held annually in Charlottesville and Richmond, respectively. Annual fan conventions in the commonwealth include Anime USA, the national anime convention held in Crystal City, Anime Mid-Atlantic held in various cities, and Magfest music and gaming festival. The Old Time Fiddlers' Convention in Galax, begun in 1935, is one of the oldest and largest such events worldwide.
