= Virginia Peninsula AVA =

American Viticultural Area in Virginia

Coordinates: 37°28′18″N 76°49′42″W

Virginia Peninsula
- Wine region
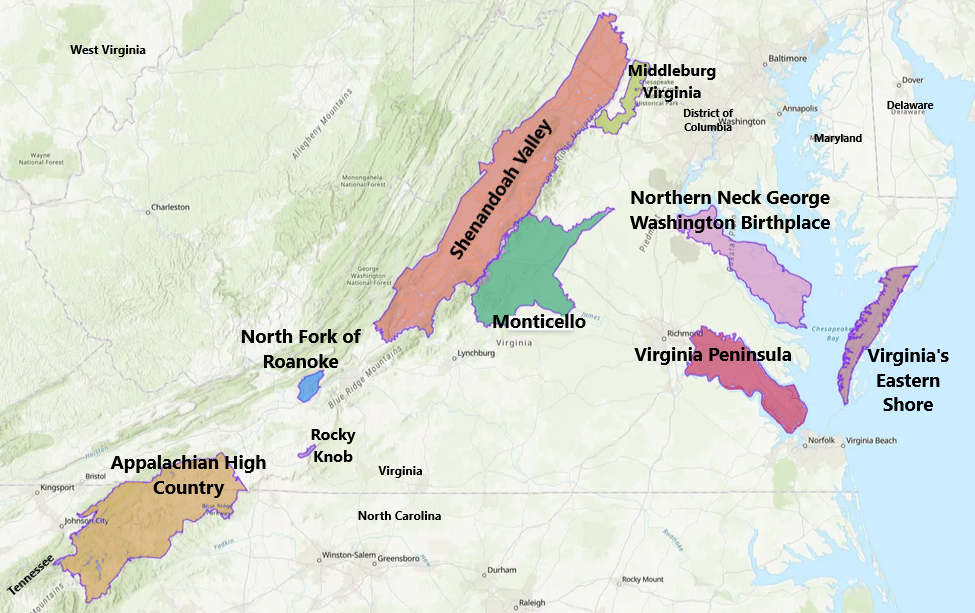
- Type: American Viticultural Area
- Year established: 2021
- Country: United States
- Part of: Virginia
- Other regions in Virginia: Appalachian High Country AVA, Middleburg Virginia AVA, Monticello AVA, North Fork of Roanoke AVA, Northern Neck George Washington Birthplace AVA, Rocky Knob AVA, Shenandoah Valley AVA, Virginia's Eastern Shore AVA
- Growing season: 193–213 days
- Climate region: Region I-II
- Heat units: 2,063-2,884 GDD units
- Precipitation (annual average): 40.4 in (1,030 mm)
- Soil conditions: Sedimentary in nature with igneous or metamorphic rock base
- Total area: 673,059 acres (1,052 sq mi)
- Size of planted vineyards: 112 acres (45 ha)
- No. of vineyards: 6
- Grapes produced: Cabernet Franc, Chambourcin, Chardonnay, Merlot, Norton, Petite Verdot, Petit Manseng, Riesling, Tannat, Vidal Blanc and Viognier
- No. of wineries: 6

Virginia Peninsula is an American Viticultural Area (AVA) located in southeast Virginia encompassing James City, York, New Kent and Charles City Counties including the cities of Poquoson, Hampton, Newport News and Williamsburg. It was established as the nation's 258^{th} and the state's ninth appellation on August 25, 2021, by the Alcohol and Tobacco Tax and Trade Bureau (TTB), Treasury after reviewing the petition submitted by The Williamsburg Winery, proposing a viticultural area named "Virginia Peninsula."

The AVA identifies from its location on the natural landform known as the Virginia Peninsula, outlined by the York River, James River, Hampton Roads and Chesapeake Bay. It is sometimes known as the Lower Peninsula to distinguish it from two other peninsulas to the north, the Middle Peninsula and the Northern Neck.

The petition noted land coverage as 673,059 acres (1,052 sq mi) with five commercial vineyards cultivating approximately 112 acres (45 ha). Future plans included an additional 61 acres (25 ha) of vineyards. The petition identified the distinguishing features of the Virginia Peninsula AVA as its geology and climate.

== History ==
Virginia has a history of commercial wine making that dates back to its earliest settlers. Indigenous tribes and early European settlers harvested the native fox grapes from the local frontier. The Virginia Peninsula region is the site of historic Jamestown, founded in 1607, the first English settlement in North America, and historic Williamsburg, an influential colonial town where wine has a long history gracing the tables of many early Virginian colonists. Many of the wines were imported from France, but in an effort to support a buy-local movement of the time, the Williamsburg House of Burgesses decreed "Twelfth Acte" requiring all households to plant vineyards in 1619. Nearby, on College Creek, Jockey's Neck was used for planting grapes by John Johnson (or Johnston). In 1760, proposals were made to the General Assembly for the encouragement of this useful undertaking. It stipulated to "stimulate the cultivation of the vineyard proposing that £500 be given as a premium to any persons producing the best wine in a quantity no less than 10 hogshead." Around 1807, Thomas Jefferson, considered one of the greatest patrons of wine in the United States, had established two vineyards in his south orchard. His goal to make wine from his Virginia Monticello estate was met with the unsuccessful cultivation of the classic European grape varieties due to the inability to control black rot and the destructive aphid-like root louse called phylloxera.

Wine production was nationally acknowledged as early in the 1840 national census. By 1889, the area's principal wine grapes were Concord, Virginia Norton and Martha. In the early 1900s, Charlottesville's Monticello Wine Company and its Virginia Claret Wine were so well-regarded that the city declared itself to be "the Capital of the Wine Belt in Virginia." Grape production increased until 1925 at which time there was a major reduction in vine and wine production throughout Virginia coupled with the onset of Prohibition. However, grape hybridization and experimentation continued at Virginia Tech's horticultural farm on the North Fork throughout the 1920s right up to present times. Numerous crosses were made and five varieties released from 1949 through 1969. Today, Virginia Tech operates its experimental vineyard in the Valley of the North Fork, including varietals trials of advanced breeding lines from other states. Other vineyards are emerging with wine producing cultivars of vitis vinifera and European hybrids replacing American varieties.

== Terroir ==
=== Geology ===
The geology of the AVA serves to distinguish it from the region to the west. The Virginia Peninsula AVA, along with the regions to the north and south, is located on the Atlantic Coastal Plain, a region of low topographic relief with elevations ranging from sea level to approximately 250 feet (76 m). The Atlantic Coastal Plain is underlain by Cenozoic-era sand, mud, and gravel which were deposited during periods of higher sea levels. These sediments are geologically young, ranging from 4 to 5 million years in age to less than 100,000 years. As a result, very few fault lines are found within the Atlantic Coastal Plain. According to the petition, the geological formations of the AVA are ideal for viticulture, as the bedrock tends to be fractured, allowing for greater root depth and greater rainfall permeability. To the west of the Virginia Peninsula AVA are the Hopewell fault and the Atlantic Seaboard Fall Line, which mark the beginning of the Piedmont and Blue Ridge regions of Virginia. The geology of these regions consists of igneous and metamorphic rock, including granite and gneiss. The bedrock is older than that of the AVA, dating back approximately 700 million years to the Precambrian age. The bedrock is less porous and less fractured than the bedrock of the AVA. As a result, neither grapevine roots nor rain can penetrate as deeply as within the more fractured bedrock of the AVA.

=== Topography ===
Virginia Peninsula AVA is located on the natural feature known as the Virginia Peninsula in southeastern Virginia. The northern, eastern, and southern boundaries of the AVA follow the natural features that delineate the peninsula. The York River forms the northern boundary of both the peninsula and the AVA, while the James River forms the southern boundary. The eastern boundary of the AVA is formed by Hampton Roads and the Chesapeake Bay. According to the petition, the western boundary of the peninsula is less precisely defined and is marked by a change in elevation and soil type. In order to approximate this change in elevation and soil, the petition places the western boundary of the AVA east of the city of Richmond, along the western boundary of New Kent County and Charles City County.

=== Climate ===
The Virginia Peninsula AVA is characterized by a humid subtropical climate, with long, humid summers and moderate to mild winters. The petition included on the average growing season high and low temperatures, growing season maximum high and minimum low temperatures, and the annual number of days during the growing season with temperatures over 90 and 100 °F (32–38 °C) for locations within the AVA, to the north, and to the south. Additionally, the petition included data on the average annual and harvest period rainfall amounts for the same locations. Data was not provided for the region to the west. The climate data suggests that the Virginia Peninsula AVA has temperatures that are warmer than the regions to the north and south. Rainfall amounts in the AVA are generally greater than in the region to the north and lower than in the region to the south. According to the petition, temperatures above 90 °F (32 °C) reduce photosynthesis in grapevines. Because photosynthesis is the process which produces sugar, reduced photosynthesis rates would require fruit to hang longer to achieve optimal sugar levels. The longer hang time increases the risk of disease or animals destroying a crop before it can be harvested. The petition states that, on average, almost 30 percent of the growing season days within the AVA have temperatures above 90 °F (32 °C). Additionally, frequent rains during the harvest period, particularly rainfall amounts over 1/2 inch (13 mm), can cause ripening fruit to swell or split and can dilute flavors. The high growing season temperatures combined with frequent rainfall during the typical harvest season mean that vineyard managers frequently face the decision whether to pick grapes before they've reached peak ripeness, or to let the fruit continue to ripen but potentially spoil. The USDA plant hardiness zones range from 7b to 8b.

== Viticulture ==
In August 2012, there were just over 112 acres (45 ha) planted to commercial vineyards. There are currently at least six commercial vineyards and six bonded wineries operating within the Virginia Peninsula AVA including the Williamsburg Winery, Jolene Family Winery, Gauthier Vineyards, New Kent Winery, Saudé Creek Vineyards and Upper Shirley Vineyards.

Kirsten M. Duffeler and Amanda Shortt of The Williamsburg Winery were the petitioners for the Virginia Peninsula AVA that has unique climatological and geological conditions for growing grapes. Now a total of six successful wineries are located on the Peninsula and the formalization of the AVA is recognition that they are in a distinct wine producing region with some special characteristics.

A wide range of wine types and styles are produced within the Virginia Peninsula AVA. Classic vinifera grapes including Cabernet Franc, Merlot, Chardonnay, Riesling, and Viognier, as relatively obscure vinifera grapes Tannat, Petite Verdot, and Petit Manseng are processed. Hybrid varieties including Norton, Chambourcin, and Vidal Blanc are also grown in the region as well.

As Virginia's newest AVA, Virginia Peninsula produces some of the best wine in the Commonwealth achieving national and international acclaim. Consequently, the Virginia Peninsula Wine Trail boasts a successful enotourism industry providing visitors a scenic hospitality to sample the terroir-driven vintages reminiscent of other prestigious wine-growing regions in Europe and pay homage to the early settlers who planted the first regional vineyards.

== See also ==
- Virginia Wine
- List of wineries in Virginia
