= Middleburg Virginia AVA =

American Viticultural Area in Virginia

Coordinates: 38°57′37″N 77°44′46″W

Middleburg Virginia
- Wine region
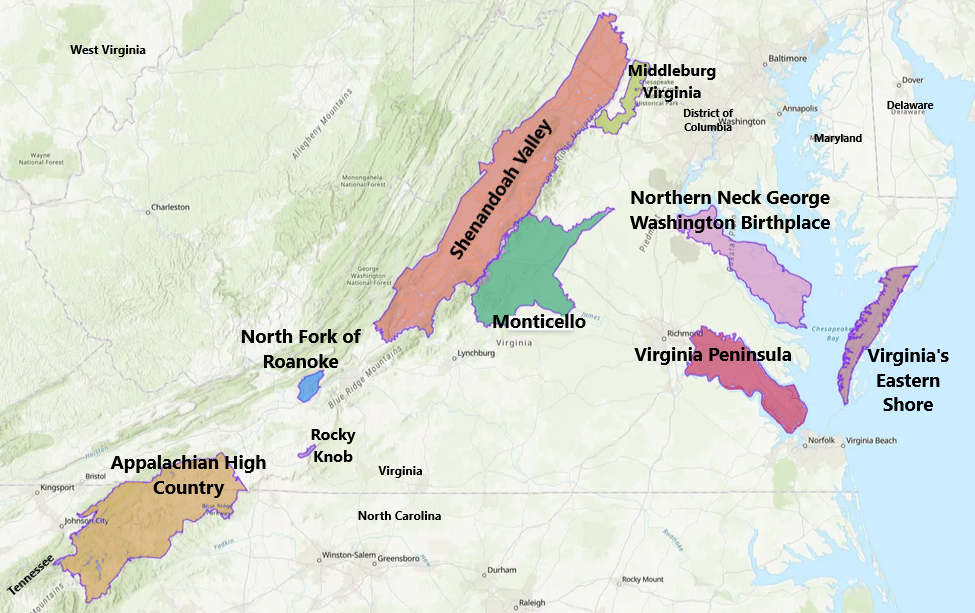
- Type: American Viticultural Area
- Year established: 2012
- Years of wine industry: 54
- Country: United States
- Part of: Virginia
- Other regions in Virginia: Appalachian High Country AVA, Monticello AVA, North Fork of Roanoke AVA, Northern Neck George Washington Birthplace AVA, Rocky Knob AVA, Shenandoah Valley AVA, Virginia's Eastern Shore AVA, Virginia Peninsula AVA
- Growing season: 177 days
- Climate region: Region IV
- Heat units: 3,568 GDD
- Precipitation (annual average): 25.55 in (649 mm)
- Soil conditions: Purcellville-Tankerville-Middleburg and Tankerville-Philomont soil associations upon bedrock of granite and gneiss
- Total area: 123,520 acres (193 sq mi)
- Size of planted vineyards: 251 acres (102 ha)
- No. of vineyards: 12
- Grapes produced: Merlot, Chardonnay, Cabernet Franc, Nebbiolo, Cabernet Sauvignon, Riesling
- No. of wineries: 24

Middleburg Virginia is an American Viticultural Area (AVA) in the northern Piedmont region of Virginia within Fauquier and Loudoun Counties about 50 miles (80 km) west of Washington, D.C. It is named for the town of Middleburg, Virginia centered in the viticultural area outlined by the Potomac River to the north and mountainous landforms, specifically, the Catoctin and Bull Run Mountains to the east, Watery, Swains, Little Cobbler, and Hardscrabble Mountains to the south, and the Blue Ridge Mountains to the west. It was established as the nation's 206^{th} and the state's seventh appellation on September 13, 2012 by the Alcohol and Tobacco Tax and Trade Bureau (TTB), Treasury after reviewing the petition submitted by Rachel E. Martin, executive vice president of Boxwood Winery in Middleburg, on behalf of herself and local vintners, proposing the viticultural area to be known as "Middleburg Virginia." The distinguishing features of the Middleburg Virginia viticultural area are its climate, topography, geology, and soils.

== History ==
The founding of Virginia in 1607 in establishing Jamestown marked the founding of winemaking here as well. A primary aim of the Virginia Company was to start a successful wine industry in the New World. The passage of Acte 12 by the Virginia House of Burgesses in 1619 ordered household heads in Jamestown to cultivate 20 grapevines each; failure to do so carried a heavy penalty. Unfortunately, native pests and diseases prevented success.

In the eighteenth century, Thomas Jefferson, the third president, continued attempts to cultivate European grapevines at his Monticello estate. He was unsuccessful for the same reason that the Jamestown settlers could not cultivate European grapes: native pests that attack the roots of the grapevines.

Wine industries grew and flourished during the nineteenth century with Norton and other native grapes. It ended during Prohibition and the industry did not reestablish itself again until the 1970s when Virginia wine pioneers establish six wineries. In 1972, owners of Meredyth Vineyards in Middleburg planted 2,300 vines and went on to expand to 60 acres (24 ha). The oldest winery within the Middleburg Virginia AVA is Swedenberg Estate Vineyuard, established in 1987 and later becoming Greenhill Winery & Vineyards in 2013. The number of vineyards increased over the years as Rachel Martin, Executive Vice President of Boxwood Winery, began petitioning the TTB in 2008 proposing Middleburg Virginia as a unique viticultural area.

== Terroir ==
=== Topography ===
The terrain of the Middleburg Virginia viticultural area generally contains rolling hills, woods, and many creeks. It is located within the Blue Ridge Anticlinorium, between the Blue Ridge Mountains to the west and the Catoctin and Bull Run Mountains to the east. As shown on the USGS maps, elevations within the viticultural area range from 220 feet (67 m) (along the Potomac River shoreline, which forms the northern portion of the boundary line) to 1,470 feet (450 m) (at the peak of Naked Mountain in the southwest corner of the viticultural area). According to the USGS maps, the southern portion of the viticultural area trends southeast to southwest toward the foothills of the Blue Ridge Mountains and gradually gains in elevation. The steep slopes of the 600-to-890-foot (180–270 m) Catoctin Mountain ridge are located to the east of the boundary line of the Middleburg Virginia viticultural area. The 700-to-1,370-foot (210–420 m) Bull Run Mountains are located to the southeast, which contrast with the 450-to-550-foot (140–170 m) gently mounded hills, rolling terrain, and spring-fed ponds and lakes within the viticultural area, according to the USGS maps. The USGS maps also show that the 900-to-1,340-foot (270–410 m) Watery Mountains are located to the south of the boundary line of the viticultural area. By contrast, the land formations within the southern portion of the viticultural area are less undulating, a feature that is important for a vineyard site, according to Alex Blackburn, the certified soil scientist who compiled the soils data for the petition, The Little Cobbler, Red Oak, and Hardscrapple Mountains, which are heavily wooded with steep slopes ranging in elevation from 800 to 1,300 feet (240–400 m), are located to the southwest of the viticultural area. This area is not recommended for grape growing because of erosion hazards and the difficulty of cultivation along the sleep slopes of the region, according to Mr. Blackburn. According to the USGS maps, the steep terrain and ridgelines of the 1,200-to-1,800-foot (370–550 m) Blue Ridge Mountains are located to the west of the boundary line. The higher elevations and mountainous terrain of the Blue Ridge Mountains contrast with the lower elevation, rolling terrain within the viticultural area, as shown on the USGS maps. The Potomac River is immediately to the north of the northern portion of the boundary line, flowing eastward into the Chesapeake Bay, as indicated on the USGS maps. North of the Potomac River, the terrain in Maryland is similar to that of the viticultural area.

=== Climate ===
The geographical location and terrain of the Middleburg Virginia viticultural area result in a unique microclimate within the larger northern Virginia region. Climatic data for the 2005 and 2006 average growing seasons (April 1 to October 31) for the viticultural area distinguish it from the surrounding regions The Middleburg Virginia viticultural area has both cooler highs and warmer lows than the surrounding regions during the growing season. As a result, the viticultural area has a more moderated growing season climate than the surrounding areas. TTB notes that the moderated growing season temperatures contribute to developing consistent grape growth and achieving maturity for harvest before the onset of freezing temperatures. The Middleburg Virginia viticultural area is generally cooler than the surrounding areas in Virginia as evidenced by its lower number of growing degree days. The average total precipitation for the Middleburg Virginia viticultural area growing season is 25.55 in (649 mm), which is greater than the growing season precipitation totals for the surrounding Hagerstown, Winchester, Culpeper, Leesburg, Dulles, and Manassas areas, at 16.60 in (422 mm), 19.92 in (506 mm), 21.03 in (534 mm), 18.78 in (477 mm), 30.38 in (772 mm), and 17.36 in (441 mm), respectively. The Middleburg Virginia viticultural area receives significantly more growing season precipitation than the surrounding areas except for the Dulles area the east, which receives almost 5 inches (127 mm) more precipitation during the growing season. The wind speed average for the Middleburg Virginia viticultural area is 2.25 miles per hour (mph) 4 km/h, which is significantly less than the wind speed averages for the surrounding Hagerstown, Winchester, Leesburg, Dulles, and Manassas areas, at 6.5 in (165 mm), 3.5 in (89 mm), 3.0 in (76 mm), 6.0 in (152 mm), and 2.6 in (66 mm), respectively (although it is greater than the wind speed average for the Culpeper area to the south, at 1.5 in (38 mm)). The moderate winds in the viticultural area, which consist of gentle western breezes from the Ashby Gap in the Blue Ridge Mountains, dissipate the morning fog, lessen the effect of frost, and reduce mildew during the growing season. The USDA plant hardiness zones range from 7a to 7b.

=== Geology ===
A geology map submitted with the petition shows that the Middleburg Virginia viticultural area is underlain predominantly by fractured granite and gneiss bedrock with scattered, small greenstone dykes. According to the Mr. Blackburn, the granite and gneiss bedrock underlying the Middleburg Virginia viticultural area produce soils that are generally lower in natural fertility and water availability, which reduces problems related to vine vigor and produces better fruit quality. The boundary line of the Middleburg Virginia viticultural area largely follows the distinctive geology of the area, which contrasts to the geology of the surrounding regions. The Potomac River and Maryland are located to the north of the Middleburg Virginia viticultural area. In Maryland, the intrusions of greenstone resembling Catoctin greenstone are more numerous than those in the granites and gneisses in the viticultural area. The greenstone intrusions to the north are so numerous that they more closely resemble the Catoctin greenstone formation that is located to the east, southeast, and west of the viticultural area. The regions to the east of the Middleburg Virginia viticultural area are dominated by the Catoctin Formation, which consists of mostly greenstone and charnokytes, and also some acidic quartzite. The Catoctin Formation continues to the Antietam Formation, which underlies the Bull Run Mountains. To the southeast of the viticultural area, the bedrock consists of schist and phyllites. An area of the same granite and gneiss bedrock formations as those within the viticultural area lies to the southwest of the boundary line, although those areas are at higher elevations and are not well-suited for grape growing. To the west of the Middleburg Virginia viticultural area, granites and gneisses continue to units of the Catoctin Formation, both of which form the Blue Ridge Mountains. The Ridge and Valley province, consisting of folded sedimentary rocks, begins on the western side of the Blue Ridge Mountains.

=== Soils ===
The soils evidence in the petition was documented by Mr. Blackburn, with contributions from Jim Sawyer, Head Soil Specialist, Fauquier County, Virginia, and Frederick M. Garst, GIS Specialist, USDA–NRCS, Harrisonburg, Virginia. The Purcellville-Tankerville-Middleburg and the Tankerville-Philomont soil associations are the dominant soil associations in the viticultural area. These soils formed in the granite and gneiss bedrock of the viticultural area, with some occasional greenstone dike. Messrs. Sawyer and Garst noted that the dominant soil characteristics and prevalent geological properties distinguish the Middleburg Virginia viticultural area from the surrounding areas. The Purcellville soils are very deep and well-drained, with moderate available water capacity, or water available to plants. Tankerville soils are moderately deep and well-drained to excessively drained, with a lower available water capacity than Purcellville soils. Philomont soils, formed in relatively coarser granite than that in which Purcellville and Tankerville soils formed, are very deep and well-drained, with low available water capacity. Compared to the surrounding areas, the soils in the viticultural area are generally lower in natural fertility and in available water capacity. According to Mr. Blackburn, these four soils are among the best in the Blue Ridge Physiographic Province for fruit production, and grapevines grown in these soils have better quality fruit with few vigor problems. However, vineyard blocks containing these soils must be sited on specific landforms with good natural drainage that are not easily erodible or susceptible to frost. The soils of lesser extent in the Middleburg Virginia viticultural area include Mongle, Codorus, and Hatboro soils (13 percent of the total land area); Swampoodle and Purcellville soils (11 percent); and Eubanks soils (6.5 percent). The Mongle, Codorus, Hatboro, and Swampoodle soils are moderately well-drained to very poorly drained and are located in flood plains or other low-lying areas that are generally unsuited to grape production. The Eubanks soils are very deep and well-drained, with moderate available water capacity. Most of the soils outside of the viticultural area are different because they formed in rocks that are different from those in the Middleburg Virginia viticultural area. To the north, in Maryland, the soils formed in bedrock with increased greenstone intrusions. The greenstone intrusions affect soil fertility and available water capacity, which, in turn, affects vineyard management, vine growth, and fruit quality. To the south, toward and through Culpepper County, the soils formed in granite and gneisses, with fewer greenstone intrusions than in the viticultural area. The soils in that region more closely resemble Philomont soils than the Purcellville, Tankerville, and Swampoodle soils in the viticultural area. To the east, the dominant Airmont, Weverton, and Stumptown soils formed in the mainly quartzite Antietam Formation, which is a continuation of the Catoctin Formation. To the west, the soils formed in granite and gneiss, which continue as units of the Catoctin Formation. Thus, as compared to the soils in the viticultural area, the soils in the surrounding areas would require different vineyard management, produce different yields, and result in different vine growth and fruit quality.

== See also ==
- Virginia Wine
- List of wineries in Virginia
