= Foodbank of Southeastern Virginia and the Eastern Shore =

Food bank in Norfolk, Virginia, U.S.

The Foodbank of Southeastern Virginia and the Eastern Shore (Foodbank SEVA) is a 501(c)(3) hunger-relief organization headquartered in Norfolk, Virginia. It was incorporated in 1981 and serves communities in South Hampton Roads and on Virginia's Eastern Shore. Foodbank SEVA is a member of the Feeding America network and the Federation of Virginia Food Banks.

== History ==
The Foodbank of Southeastern Virginia and the Eastern Shore was launched in September 1980 as a project of the STOP organization, with a $5,000 Community Services Administration grant. It initially operated "hand-to-mouth", from a location at 141 Dorset Avenue, Virginia Beach. By February 1981, 48,486 lb of food had been received, with 12,564 pounds distributed. Shared-maintenance fees collected $1,385.10 and there were 71 partner agencies on the food bank's roster. In May 1981, after being denied a $75,000 federal grant, local business leaders raised $25,000, and the United Way endorsed the fledgling food bank. By 1985 after $650,000 capital campaign had been raised, with United Way support, the foodbank purchased and renovated a new operating base in 2308 Granby Street, Norfolk.

The Norfolk Free Clinic transferred its remaining $60,000 and the funds from the Ghent/Stockley Garden Art Show fundraiser to the Foodbank upon its dissolution. SHARE Mid-Atlantic merged with Foodbank SEVA (with the corporate entity unchanged), with the food bank's self-help model was regarded as complementing traditional charitable endeavours. A professional direct-mail campaign was tested, with the $2–3 return per dollar deemed inadequate. A list of 14,000 donors was captured for future targeted appeals, and financing purchase of a permanent Eastern Shore building in Tasley; The organisation's thrift store became a profit centre.

In July 2025, the Foodbank proposed a new 103,000-square-foot regional warehouse and distribution hub on Dam Neck Road in Virginia Beach. The Planning Commission unanimously backed the rezoning request, highlighting the project's ability to double dry-goods storage and triple perishable capacity. Plans also included raised gardens, on-site farming areas, and preserved tree buffers to ease community concerns. In August 2025, the Virginia Beach City Council unanimously approved the rezoning, giving the project its official green light. Backed by the $25 million "Setting the Table" capital campaign—with $9.5 million already raised—the Foodbank announced a two-to-three-year construction timeline. The new hub is designed to become the region's largest hunger-relief distribution center, supporting more than 200 partner agencies across Southeastern Virginia and the Eastern Shore.

== Programs and services ==
=== Kids' Cafe ===
Launched in April 1999 at the Colonial and Diggs Town Boys & Girls Clubs, Kids Cafe provides evening meals to children in safe afterschool environments. The program is supported by the Howard and Alma Laderberg Endowment through the Tidewater Jewish Foundation.

=== Backpack program ===
Initiated in 2009, the BackPack Program provides food for children over weekends. Backpacks contain shelf-stable food discreetly distributed to students identified by school personnel as food insecure. In the 2023–24 academic year, 68,870 bags were distributed across 64 schools.

=== Fill It Forward ===
Fill It Forward is a food donation program that provides opportunities for community members to donate non-perishable food items at partner locations. The program supports the Foodbank's food collection efforts by making it easier for individuals and organizations to contribute needed items for hunger-relief programs.

=== Izzie's Field – farm to foodbank ===
Izzie's Field is an initiative that partners with local agricultural organizations to supply produce for Foodbank clients. Supported by Kroger, New Life Church, Pop Son Farm, and Hubbard Peanut Company, the program incorporates locally grown food into distribution efforts.

== Volunteerism ==
In 2015, the Foodbank completed an 8-week Service Enterprise certification program through Volunteer Hampton Roads and Points of Light, as a recognition for high-level volunteer engagement and management. This certification was renewed in 2018 and 2022.

== Leadership ==
Executive Director	Tenure
Cindy Creed	1981–2001
Joanne Rovner	2002–2015
Dr. Ruth Jones Nichols	2016–2022
Christopher Tan	2022–present

== Partners and supporters ==
The Foodbank of Southeastern Virginia and the Eastern Shore is a member of Feeding America and the Federation of Virginia Food Banks.

By 2014, it was distributing more than 15 million meals annually across Southeastern Virginia and Isle of Wight County. Food was sorted and inspected with volunteer assistance and distributed through a network of more than 400 partner agencies, including shelters and churches.

In 2021, PRA Group donated $100,000 to the Foodbank's BackPack Program, which supplies food for children on weekends and holidays. PRA Group has since expanded its support through additional contributions and volunteer participation. Perdue Farms has also supported the BackPack Program through grants and food donations on the Eastern Shore. In 2022, the Foodbank opened a 17,000-square-foot branch in Franklin, serving the Western Tidewater region. The facility was funded by the Virginia Department of Housing and Community Development, the Obici Healthcare Foundation, Hubbard Peanut Company, and other local partners. In 2023, the Foodbank partnered with the Children's Hospital of The King's Daughters and Rite Aid Healthy Futures to distribute food to families through pediatric care sites.
