= Northern Neck George Washington Birthplace AVA =

American Viticultural Area in Virginia

Coordinates: 37°58′00″N 76°38′00″W

Northern Neck George Washington Birthplace
- Wine region
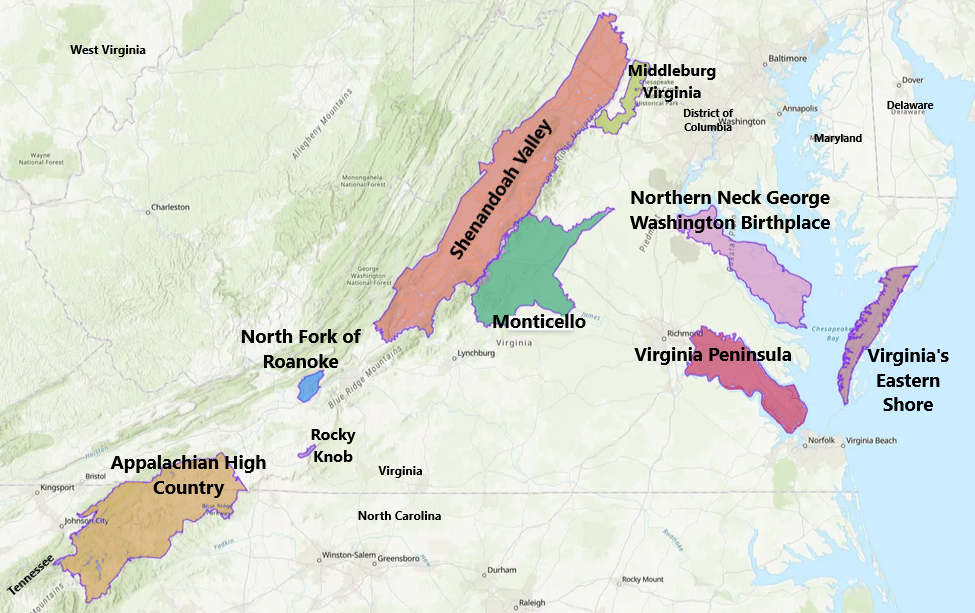
- Type: American Viticultural Area
- Year established: 1987
- Country: United States
- Part of: Virginia
- Other regions in Virginia: Appalachian High Country AVA, Middleburg Virginia AVA, Monticello AVA, North Fork of Roanoke AVA, Rocky Knob AVA, Shenandoah Valley AVA, Virginia's Eastern Shore AVA, Virginia Peninsula AVA
- Growing season: 210 days
- Precipitation (annual average): 40 inches (1,016 mm) snow: 4 in (102 mm)
- Soil conditions: Sandy flatlands along rivers and sandy clay loam along higher elevations
- Total area: 590,080 acres (922 sq mi)
- Size of planted vineyards: 92.5 acres (37 ha)
- No. of vineyards: 16
- Grapes produced: Cabernet Franc, Cabernet Sauvignon, Chambourcin, Chardonnay, Merlot, Petit Verdot, Seyval blanc, Vidal Blanc, Viognier
- No. of wineries: 6

Northern Neck George Washington Birthplace is an American Viticultural Area (AVA) located in the eastern portion of the state of Virginia entirely encompassing five counties of Westmoreland, King George, Northumberland, Lancaster, and Richmond, on the peninsula landform between the Potomac and Rappahannock Rivers in the Tidewater region known as the Northern Neck. It was established as the nation's 91^{st} and the state's fifth wine appellation on April 21, 1987 by the Bureau of Alcohol, Tobacco and Firearms (ATF), Treasury after reviewing the petition submitted by Carl F. Flemer Jr., owner of Ingleside Plantation Vineyards, a bonded winery located in Oak Grove, Westmoreland County, Virginia, on behalf of local growers and vintners proposing the viticultural area in the Northern Neck of Virginia known as "George Washington Birthplace Viticultural Area.”

The 590,080-acre (922 sq mi) appellation, at the outset, contained sixteen established vineyards cultivating 92.5 acres (37 ha) under vine and one winery. The petitioner owned the bonded winery located within a few miles of the historic National Park Service landmark known as George Washington Birthplace National Monument. The monument, which consists of a park facility and memorial home (the original home of George Washington was destroyed by fire), is located on 538 acres (2 km^{2}) of land.

== Name Evidence ==
The petitioner stated that the name "George Washington Birthplace" is the one name nationally associated with the Northern Neck. Although the petitioner acknowledged that the petitioned area is locally known as the "Northern Neck", he claimed that the name "Northern Neck" is not very well known throughout the rest of the State of Virginia and is almost unknown regionally or nationally.
ATF initially had reservations about the use of the petitioned name "George Washington Birthplace" for the entire five-county peninsula because of insufficient evidence to substantiate its use in describing this area. The petitioner maintained that the name "George Washington Birthplace" was the most appropriate name for the viticultural area. The evidence submitted by the petitioner did not establish that the name "George Washington Birthplace" was predominantly associated with the five-county area. On the other hand, the name "Northern Neck" has been well documented for over three centuries and is still used today in maps and other commonly used reference sources to describe the five-county peninsula. Evidence gathered during the rulemaking process from sources such as the University of Virginia, The College of William and Mary, George Mason University, Rappahannock Community College, and the Commonwealth of Virginia, indicated that both names, "George Washington Birthplace" and "Northern Neck", were used to identify the area. The names are often used together to identify and describe the area because of the unique history of the five-county area and the important link our first president had to it. Therefore, a viticultural area combining the names "Northern Neck" and "George Washington Birthplace" was approved by ATF. The use of these two names on wine labels and advertisements would insure consumer recognition as to the identity and origin of the wine. This combined name is appropriate since the Northern Neck is, in fact, the birthplace of America's first president, George Washington.

== History ==
No more history attaches to any small geographical area in this country than to that peninsula between the Rappahannock and Potomac Rivers known as the Northern Neck of Virginia. It may be truthfully said that this section was the birthplace of the nation. From Northumberland County, Richard Lee founded the famous Lee Family of America; Lancaster County was the home of "King" Robert Carter of "Corotoman", also the Ball family which produced Mary Ball, the Mother of Washington; Richmond County was the home of Landon Carter of "Sabine Hall" and John Taylor of "Mt. Airy"; Westmoreland County the home of Thomas Lee of "Stratford Hall" and the birthplace of Richard Henry Lee, Francis Lightfoot Lee and Robert E. Lee. James Monroe and George Washington were born only a few miles apart in upper Westmoreland; King George produced James Madison. Throughout the Northern Neck these and many other great planter families lived, prospered and held positions of great influence and leadership in the formation of this Republic. For these reasons this region became known as the "Athens of America". John Washington, the immigrant, settled near Pope's Creek in Westmoreland County in 1656. He prospered, became the owner of between four and five thousand acres, was made Colonel in the Militia, was elected vestryman, justice and a member of the House of Burgesses. From this beginning the Washington family grew in prominence throughout the area for the next several hundred years. John Washington's great grandson, George, was born on the Pope's Creek farm on February 22, 1732, over 75 years after John's arrival in the Northern Neck. George Washington Birthplace National Monument encompassing a portion of the original Pope's Creek farm, as well as the birthplace site, has been since 1932 open to the public and maintained by the park service under the supervision of the U.S. Department of the Interior. This land of the Northern Neck of Virginia as epitomized by this National Monument is widely and properly known and recognized as "The Birthplace of George Washington."

== Terroir ==
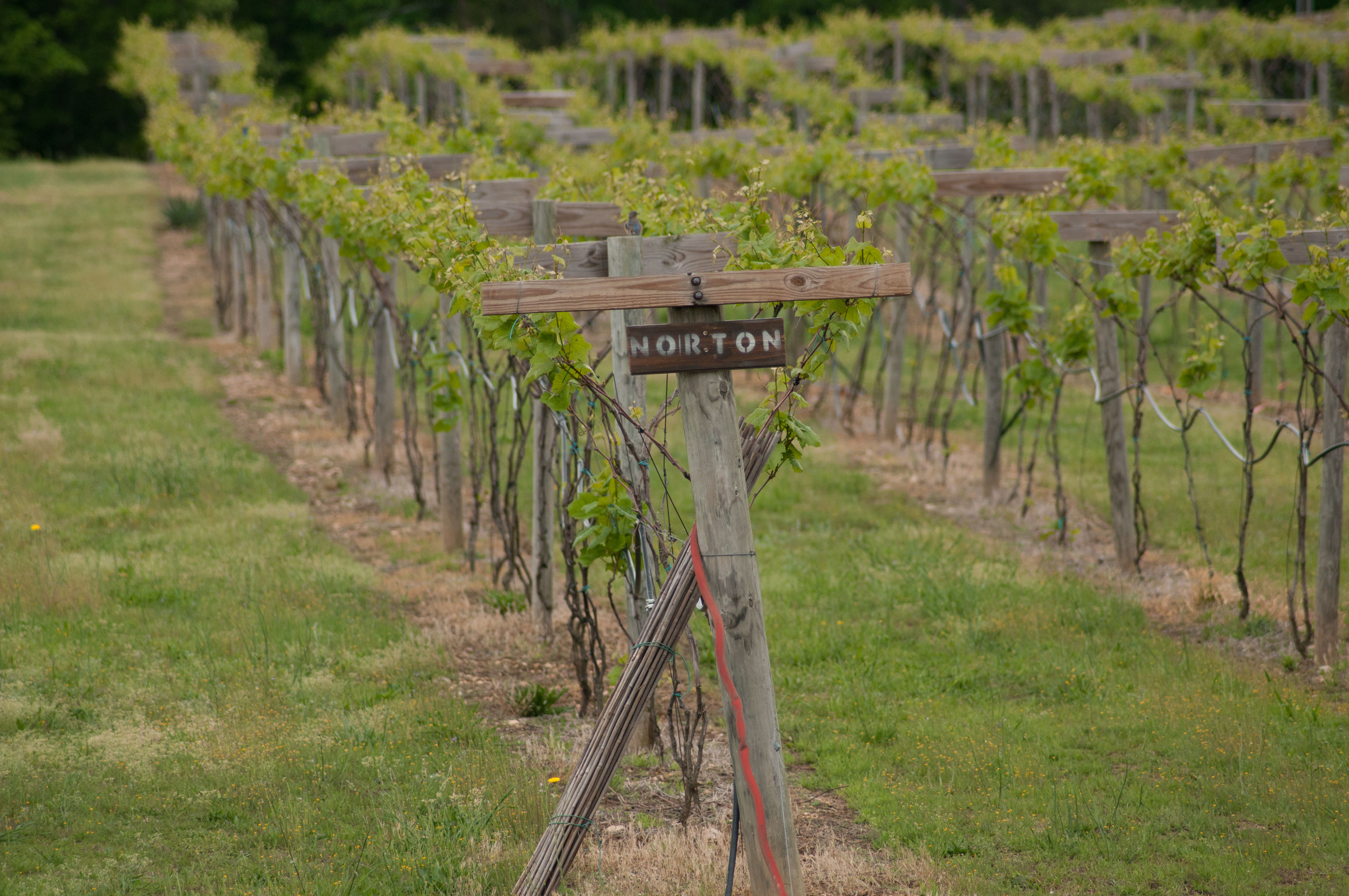

=== Climate ===
The Northern Neck George Washington Birthplace viticultural area extends approximately 100 miles (161 km) from the Chesapeake Bay westward to within a few miles of the City of Fredericksburg, Virginia. The distance on land from north to south between the Potomac and Rappahannock Rivers vanes from 10 to 20 miles (16–32 km), making the area a long narrow neck or peninsula between the two tidal rivers. The tip of the Northern Neck is located at the Chesapeake Bay.
The climate begins to change throughout the viticultural area, from the gentle influence of the Chesapeake Bay and the Potomac and Rappahannock Rivers to the more harsh influences of Piedmont Virginia in the interior land areas. This provides a climate which features more frost free days than the rest of Virginia. Historical evidence of favorable grape-growing conditions within the viticultural area was documented in Notice No. 570. The climate of the Northern Neck George Washington Birthplace viticultural area is greatly influenced by the Chesapeake Bay, the Potomac and Rappahannock Rivers. The viticultural area is almost surrounded by these bodies of water. The fanning effect from these waters tend to moderate the climate, and this is the chief reason native stands of longleaf pine (pinus taeda), southern bayberry (myrica cerifera) and other plants are found growing from King George County eastward to the Chesapeake Bay. These varieties of native stands are not found in any substantial degree to the west of King George County in Stafford County. By contrast there are native stands of hemlock (tsuga canadensis) in Stafford County which are not found anywhere on the Northern Neck. These climate features are the main characteristics which distinguish the Northern Neck George Washington Birthplace from the surrounding areas, and support its designation as a distinguishable viticultural area. The USDA plant hardiness zones are 7b and 8a.

=== Soils ===
The Northern Neck George Washington Birthplace viticultural area is entirely within the Northern Coastal Plain with topography running into two general agricultural types called neckland and upland. Neckland, located along the river flats, is nearly level with a gently sloping plateau along the center of the Northern Neck with elevations beginning at 50 feet (15 m) above sea level and reaching 190 feet (58 m) above sea level in the western areas of Westmoreland and King George Counties. The soils of the Northern Neck have been formed from material that has been transported by marine and steam action. The soils are also varied in age; the upland ridges are older and well drained while soils of the necklands are considered younger soils. Sandy clay and other well-drained soil types are found on the ridge which extends generally through the center of King George County and eastward through Westmoreland County. Other agricultural soils are found along each of the rivers, in what is generally called the river flats, with excellent air drainage and a moderating climate influenced by the huge bodies of surrounding water.

== See also ==
- Ingleside Vineyards
- George Washington
- Virginia Wine
- List of wineries in Virginia
