= Blenheim Vineyards =

Winery in Albemarle, Virginia, US

Coordinates: 37.9317°N 78.4992°W

- Location: Charlottesville, Virginia, USA
- Appellation: Monticello AVA
- Founded: 2000
- Key people: Dave Matthews, owner Kirsty Harmon, winemaker Justin Bennett, TR Manager; Ryan Bennett, Club Manager; Scott Wilcox, Operations Manager
- Cases/yr: 5,500
- Known for: Petit Verdot
- Varietals: Chardonnay, Cabernet Sauvignon, Merlot, Viognier, Petit Verdot
- Tasting: Open to the Public, small fee required
- Website: www.blenheimvineyards.com

Blenheim Vineyards is a winery located in the Piedmont region of the Commonwealth of Virginia in the county of Albemarle. It is located within both the Virginia and Monticello viticultural areas and is among the 23 wineries located on the "Monticello Wine Trail".

== History ==
Blenheim Vineyards is located on the historic Virginia farm claimed in 1730 by Secretary of the Virginia Colony John Carter who had a grant for 9,350 acres of land in Albemarle County, Virginia just south of Monticello near what is now known as Carter's Mountain. Carter maintained a mill there and his son Colonel Edward Carter built the first house there at Blenheim. The British Commander Major General William Philips resided at Blenheim while a prisoner during the Revolutionary War. Both Thomas Jefferson and Martha Jefferson were frequent guests at Blenheim during Phillips' captivity there. The Blenheim house was offered for sale at a public auction in 1840 after the original house had been destroyed by fire.

Blenheim farm was purchased in 1999 by musician Dave Matthews of the Dave Matthews Band. The Matthews family purchased the land to preserve Blenheim's historical significance and to eventually farm the land in some way. The Matthews family made the decision to plant new grape vines on the remnants of an old vineyard that was on the property. Brad McCarthy was one of the original winemakers at Blenheim Vineyards along with Peter Matthews. Dave Matthews is on the growing list of celebrities who own wineries and vineyards.

In 2008 the current Blenheim winemaker Kirsty Harmon joined Blenheim vineyards. Harmon, one of several female winemakers in Virginia, is a graduate of the University of Virginia and studied under Virginia winemaker Gabriele Rausse at the Kluge Estate owned by the deceased billionaire John Kluge's ex-wife Patricia Kluge.

== Production ==
Blenheim Vineyards has 30 acres (12 ha) under vine. The first planting was in 2000 and the second planting was in 2007. The grapes growing on the Blenheim property include Viognier, Chardonnay, Cabernet Franc, Cabernet Sauvignon, and Petit Verdot. Some grapes used in Blenheim wines are also sourced from other Virginia growers. Currently the winery produces 5,500 cases (490 hL).

Blenheim makes their Viogniers by using a mix of both barrel and tank fermented wine. Blenheim also relies on neutral, straightforward yeast strains, and use exclusively screw-cap closures on all of their wines.

== See also ==
- Virginia wine
- Monticello AVA
