= Virginia wine =

Wine originating from Virginia

Virginia
- Wine region
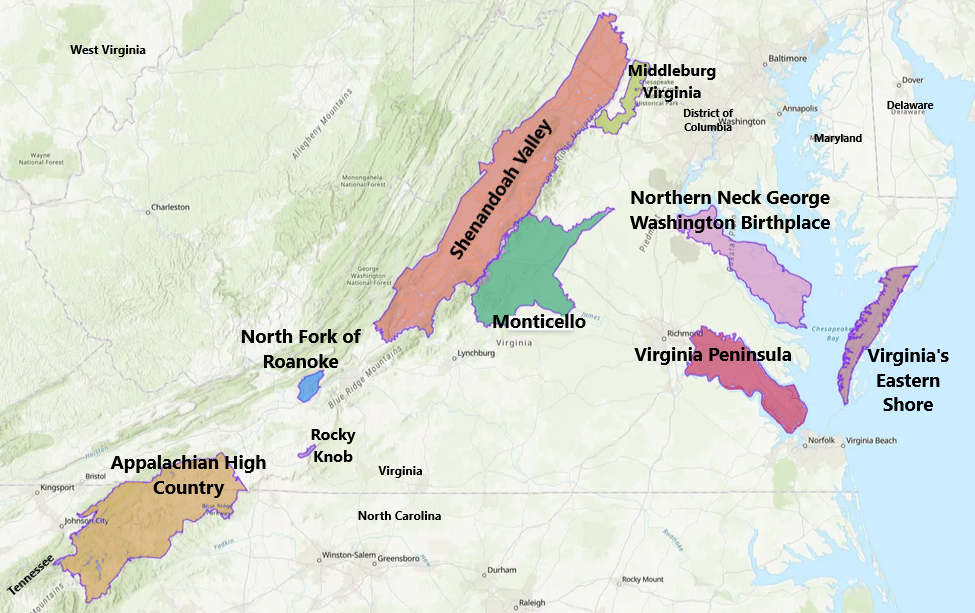
- Virginia's American Viticultural Areas (AVAs)
- Official name: Commonwealth of Virginia
- Type: U.S. State Appellation
- Years of wine industry: 417
- Country: United States
- Sub-regions: Appalachian High Country AVA, Middleburg Virginia AVA, Monticello AVA, North Fork of Roanoke AVA, Northern Neck George Washington Birthplace AVA, Rocky Knob AVA, Shenandoah Valley AVA, Virginia's Eastern Shore AVA. Virginia Peninsula AVA
- Climate region: Humid subtropical with maritime and continental in highland areas
- Total area: 25 million acres (39,490 sq mi)
- Grapes produced: Aglianico, Albariño, Barbera, Black Muscat, Cabernet Franc, Cabernet Sauvignon, Cayuga, Chambourcin, Chancellor, Chardonel, Chardonnay, Colombard, Concord, Corot noir, De Chaunac, Fer, Gewürztraminer, Graciano, Grüner Veltliner, Malbec, Malvasia, Marechal Foch, Merlot, Munson, Muscat Canelli, Muscat Ottonel, Nebbiolo, Niagara, Norton, Petit Manseng, Petit Verdot, Pinot blanc, Pinot gris, Pinot noir, Pinotage, Primitivo, Riesling, Rkatziteli, Roussanne, Ruby Cabernet, Sangiovese, Sauvignon blanc, Scheurebe, Semillon, Seyval blanc, Steuben, Syrah, Tannat, Tempranillo, Tinta Cão, Touriga Nacional, Traminette, Trebbiano, Verdelho, Vidal blanc, Vignoles, Villard blanc, Viognier, Zinfandel
- No. of wineries: 280+

Virginia wine refers to wine made primarily from grapes grown in the commonwealth of Virginia. State names in the United States automatically qualify as legal appellations of origin for wine produced from grapes grown in that state and do not require registration with the Alcohol and Tobacco Tax and Trade Bureau (TTB) of the Treasury Department. TTB was created in January 2003, when the Bureau of Alcohol, Tobacco and Firearms, or ATF, was extensively reorganized under the provisions of the Homeland Security Act of 2002.
Virginia has hot humid summers that can be challenging to viticulture, and only within the last twenty years has the industry developed beyond novelty status. By tonnage, Vitis vinifera varieties represents 75% of total production. French hybrid varieties account for nearly 20% of total wine grape production in the commonwealth, while American varietals make up only about 5% of the total. As of 2012, the top 5 varietals produced are Chardonnay, Cabernet Franc, Merlot, Vidal blanc and Viognier.

As of 2016, the commonwealth has approximately 2,800 acres (1,100 ha) under cultivation, with a total harvest of over 6500 tons. The commonwealth ranks fifth in the nation for both bearing acreage and grape production. The central and northern Virginia counties, in particular those located just east of the Blue Ridge Mountains, account for the significant majority of the commonwealth's production.

== History ==
Virginia has a history of commercial wine making that dates back to its earliest settlers in 1609. Indigenous tribes and early European settlers harvested the native fox grapes from the local frontier. At the first representative assembly in English America in 1619, the burgesses sitting in the Jamestown church passed "Twelfth Acte" which required Virginia colonists to plant vineyards. Near College Creek, Jockey's Neck was used for planting grapes by John Johnson (or Johnston). In 1760, proposals were made to the General Assembly for the encouragement of this useful undertaking. It stipulated to "stimulate the cultivation of the vineyard proposing that £500 be given as a premium to any persons producing the best wine in a quantity no less than 10 hogshead." Around 1807, Thomas Jefferson, considered one of the greatest patrons of wine in the United States, had established two vineyards in his south orchard. His goal to make wine from his Virginia Monticello estate was met with the unsuccessful cultivation of the classic European grape varieties due to the inability to control black rot and the destructive aphid-like root louse called phylloxera.

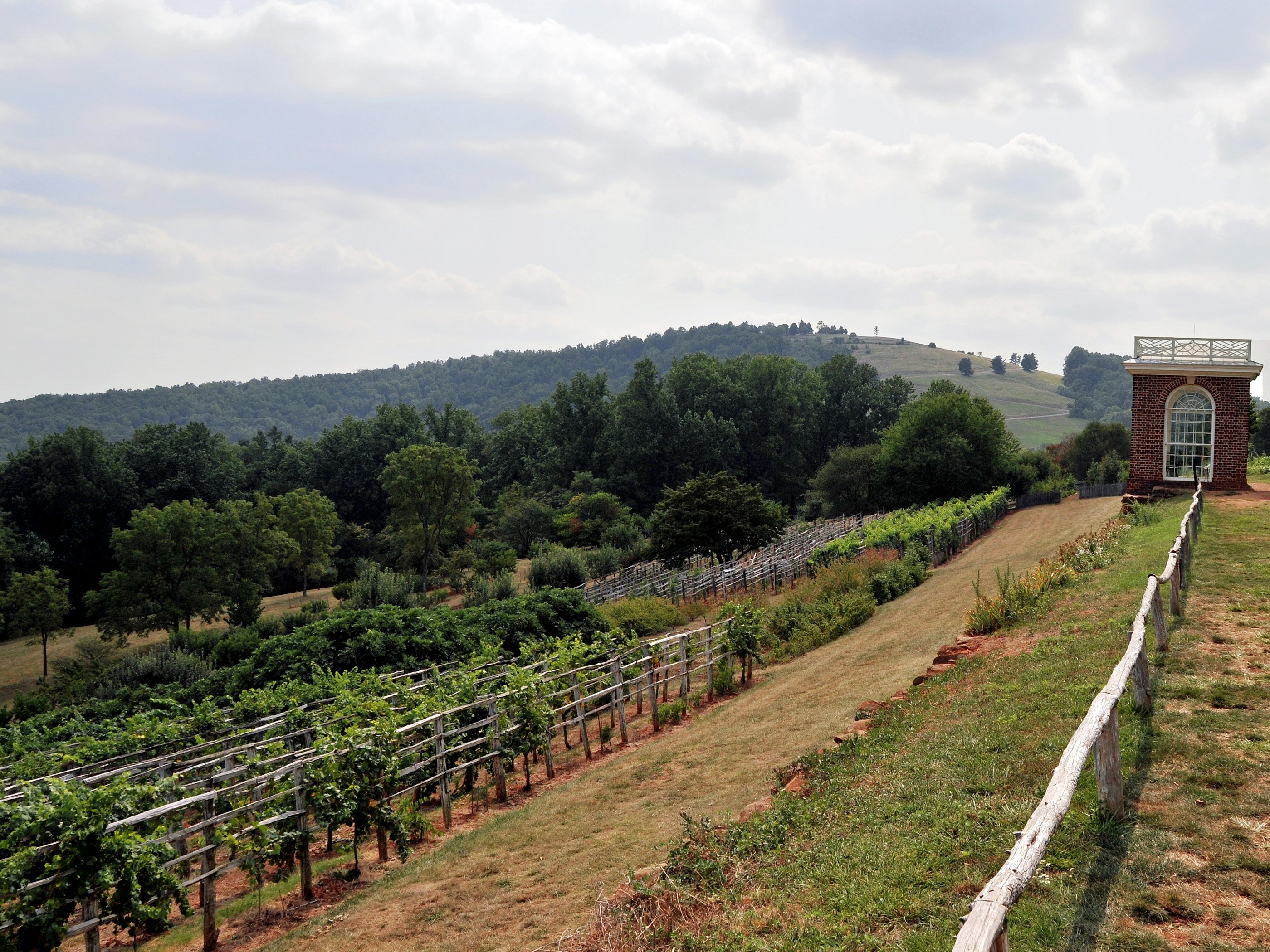
Thomas Jefferson's Monticello vineyard did not produce wine until the late 20th century.

Wine production was nationally acknowledged as early in the 1840 national census. By 1889, the area's principal wine grapes were Concord, Virginia Norton and Martha. In the early 1900s, Charlottesville's Monticello Wine Company and its Virginia Claret Wine were so well-regarded that the city declared itself to be "the Capital of the Wine Belt in Virginia." Grape production increased until 1925 at which time there was a major reduction in vine and wine production throughout Virginia coupled with the onset of Prohibition. However, grape hybridization and experimentation continued at Virginia Tech's horticultural farm on the North Fork throughout the 1920's right up to present times. Numerous crosses were made and five varieties released from 1949 through 1969. Today, Virginia Tech operates its experimental vineyard in the Valley of the North Fork, including varietals trials of advanced breeding lines from other states. Other vineyards are emerging with wine producing cultivars of vitis vinifera and European hybrids replacing American varieties.

== Viticulture ==
The state's viticulture rebirth was led in part by the investment of the Zonin family of Italy in a new vineyard in Barboursville in 1976. Barboursville Vineyards served as a catalyst in the 1970s, alongside the now defunct Oakencroft Vineyards. A growing number of for-profit and non-profit organizations have been established since the 1980s to help promote Virginia wine. Two of the more well known organizations are the Virginia Vineyards Association (VVA) and the Virginia Wineries Association (VWA). The state of Virginia has taken an active role in helping promote the wine industry in the state even to the extent of managing a state wide distributor company for Virginia wineries called Virginia Winery Distribution Company (VWDC) that was established by the Virginia Department of Agriculture and Consumer Services. The intent of the VWDC is to provide wholesale wine distribution services for Virginia farm wineries, many of which are too small to manage on their own. Throughout the 1980s and 1990s, many other vineyards and wineries joined the mix and by 2009, over 163 wineries were operating in Virginia. By 2020 there were over 280 wineries operating in Virginia. Almost all of these are small, family-owned vineyards and wineries, and only the very largest have developed distribution networks. As a result, the wineries rely on wine tourism and direct sales for most of their revenue. To encourage visitors, they often play host to special events with music, food, and other activities.

As Virginia-labeled wines are regulated that the majority percentage of the grapes used in wine production must be grown in Virginia, and since the state does not produce enough grapes to support its wineries, the price of these grapes continues to go up, making Virginia state wines noncompetitive with states like Oregon, Washington or California. Therefore, one Floyd County winery has expanded its operation in a five-year contract to export its wines to China. Chateau Morrisette, with the help of Governor Bob McDonnell's office, will be exporting its Merlot to China, and plans to add other wines later.

As the state's wines have gained recognition, media attention has increased, including articles on key trends and acclaim from Decanter, The New York Times, The Washington Post and Wine Enthusiast. In addition, the Virginia Wineries Association joined the Wine Origins Alliance, signing the Declaration of Place, to protect wine growing place names.

== Grape varieties ==
There are a lot of grape varieties grown in the Virginia wine region. By capacity, Vitis vinifera varieties represent 75% of total production. French hybrid varieties account for nearly 20% of total wine grape production, while American varietals make up only about 5%.

The top 5 grape varietals produced historically were Chardonnay, Cabernet Franc, Merlot, Vidal Blanc, and Viognier. However, though often overlooked, Petit Manseng and Petit Verdot are used to create wines that uniquely showcase Virginia’s terroir and have received significant acclaim from aficionados and critics as particularly well suited to Virginia's terroir.

America’s oldest grape variety was born in Virginia. Some winemakers are still working to revive Norton to its prominence as America’s native grape. This grape became available in 1830 and very shortly after that came to conquer wine production in the eastern and midwestern states like Ohio and Virginia.

In 2016, 2,600 acres were under cultivation, with a total harvest of over 6500 tons. The central and northern Virginia regions account for the substantial majority of the production.

== List of vineyards and wineries ==
The number of vineyards and wineries in Virginia grows each year. As of 2024 there are over 300 registered vineyards and wineries in the state. Some notable vineyard and wineries include Barboursville Vineyards, Blenheim Vineyards, Breaux Vineyards, Chateau Morrisette Winery, Horton Vineyards, Trump Winery, and Williamsburg Winery.
