= Ankida Ridge Vineyards =

Virginia winery

- Location: 37°42'32.20002"N, 79°10'25.67906"W
- Founded: 2008
- First vintage: 2011
- Key people: Christine Vrooman, proprietor
- Website: https://ankidaridge.com/

Ankida Ridge Vineyards is a Virginia winery located in Amherst, Virginia.

Led by Christine Vrooman, Ankida Ridge started with a two acre plot at 1,800 feet above sea level that was planted in 2008 and an additional four acres were added in 2014. The first vintage of wine production was 2011. The soil is predominantly granite, with Pinot Noir and Chardonnay grapes making up the majority of the vineyard holdings. A small plot of Gamay was planted in 2014. Vineyard plantings and decision-making has been led by Lucie Morton.

Accolades have included: VinePair naming the Ankida Pinot Noir 2022 "one of the best 30 red wines for 2026", inclusion in Food & Wine's "Top Virginia Wineries to Visit" list in 2022, and being named "One of the 12 Best Wineries Across America in 2026" by The Daily Meal.

They are one of the few Virginia wineries to be invited to participate in the International Pinot Noir Celebration in McMinnville, Oregon.
