= Chateau Morrisette Winery =

Winery in Floyd, Virginia, US

Coordinates: 36°47′38″N 80°23′44″W

Chateau Morrisette
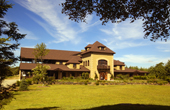
- Location: Floyd, Virginia, USA
- Appellation: Rocky Knob AVA
- Founded: 1980
- Key people: David Morrisette, President; Brian Smyth, Winemaker
- Cases/yr: 60,000
- Varietals: Chardonnay, Viognier, Chambourcin, Merlot, Cabernet Sauvignon, Cabernet Franc, Petit Verdot, Petit Manseng, Vidal blanc
- Distribution: VA, WV, NC, SC, TN, KY, GA, shipping direct to 30+ states
- Website: https://www.thedogs.com/

Chateau Morrisette Winery is a winery located in Floyd, Virginia. It was founded by David Morrisette in 1980, making it among the oldest wineries in Virginia. Containing 13 acres (5.3 ha) of land, the winery production has increased to approximately 60,000 cases per year.

== History ==
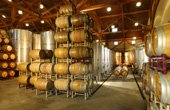
Main Cellar

William Morrisette began experimenting with grape growing in the early 1970s on the advice of the Virginia Tech Fruit and Science Department. After graduating from Mississippi State University's Viticulture and Enology program, David Morrisette returned to Virginia and ripped out the vines that his father planted. In 1978, William, Nancy and David Morrisette planted the first vines, starting the Chateau Morrisette Winery. Chateau Morrisette was one of the six wineries started in Virginia prior to 1980, making it one of the oldest wineries in the state. David Morrisette became Château Morrisette's first official winemaker. In 1982, the first commercial wines were produced, beginning with approximately 1,500 gallons. The winery has 13 acres and wine production is now in excess of 60,000 cases. The Winery underwent an expansion and modernization in 1999, including a new wine production facility and hospitality center. Blue Ridge Timberwrights constructed a building from salvaged timber from the St. Marie River and from a Seattle warehouse to create one of the largest salvaged timber-frame buildings in North America: 32,365 square feet (3,006.8 m^{2}) with over 132,000 board feet of recycled Douglas-fir timbers.

== Production ==
The production building houses over 160,000 gallons of stainless steel tank capacity, 50,000 gallons of capacity in French and American oak barrels, a twenty-two ton press and a bottling line with the capacity of 2,000 cases per shift. Château Morrisette utilizes grape production from its own vineyards and from independent growers. The winery sources many of their grapes from across Virginia. Their varieties include Chardonnay, Vidal blanc, Viognier, Cabernet Franc, Cabernet Sauvignon, Chambourcin, Merlot, Petit Verdot, Pinot noir, and Tannat.
