= Horton Vineyards =

Winery in Orange County, Virginia, US

- Location: Gordonsville, Virginia, USA
- Appellation: Monticello AVA
- Other labels: Montdomaine Cellars
- Founded: 1983
- First vintage: 1991
- Key people: Dennis Horton, founder
- Known for: Viognier
- Varietals: Viognier, Petit Verdot, Tempranillo, Cabernet Franc, Albarino, Norton (grape), Mourvedre, Syrah, Chardonnay
- Distribution: regional
- Tasting: Open to the Public
- Website: http://www.hvwine.com

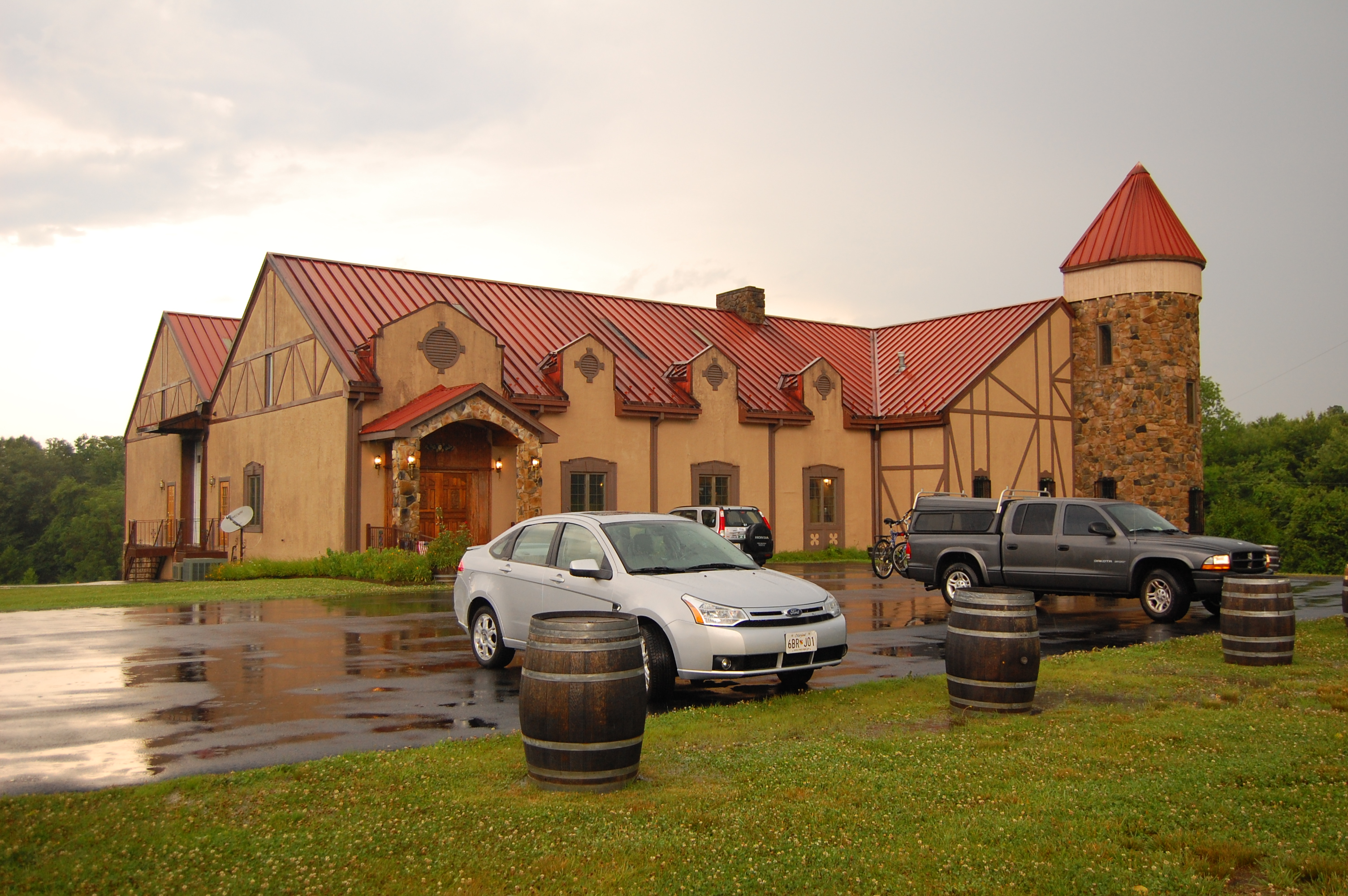
Main building of Horton Vineyards

Horton Vineyards is a winery located near to Gordonsville in Orange County, Virginia and within the Monticello AVA winemaking appellation. The winery was founded in 1983 by Denis Horton.

== History ==
Horton Vineyards was founded by Dennis Horton With his wife Sharon Horton, with a small home vineyard. The small home vineyard has grown; as a result Sharon has to work out in the vineyard, with about twenty other workers where everything is done by hand. The winery's early experimentation with grape varieties led to the conclusion that the humid weather of the Virginia Piedmont region favored grapes with thick skins and loose grape clusters. As a result of this conclusion, Horton has concentrated on varietals from the Rhône River valley in France and, in particular, on Viognier.

== Grapes grown ==
Horton Vineyards makes its wines from among the following varieties of grape:

- Marsanne
- Mourvedre
- Cabernet Franc
- Syrah
- Viognier

== Awards ==
Horton's wines have won awards at competitions both nationally and internationally.
