= Virginia's Eastern Shore AVA =

American Viticultural Area

Coordinates: 37°29′24″N 75°53′53″W

Virginia's Eastern Shore
- Wine region
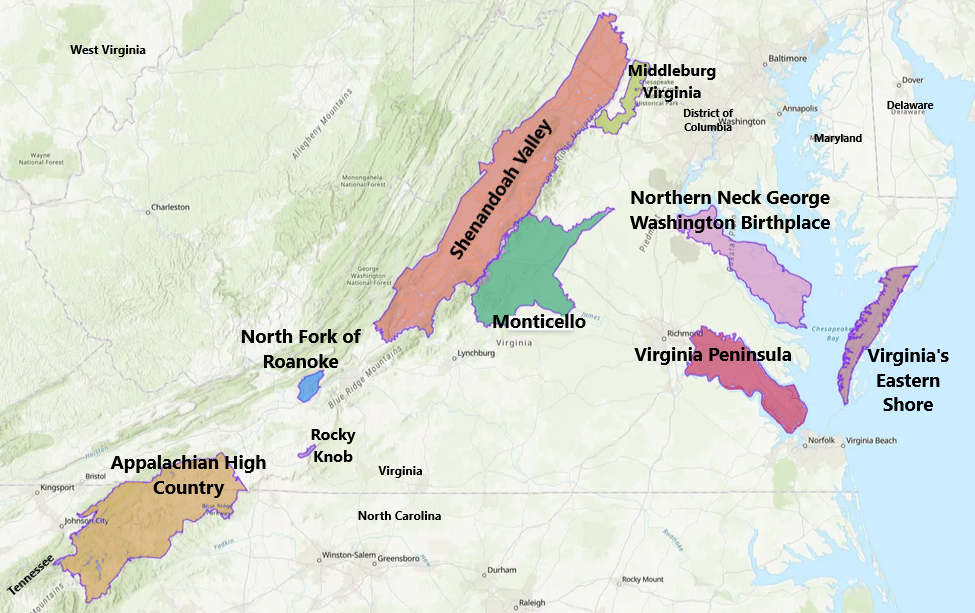
- Virginia's AVAs
- Type: American Viticultural Area
- Year established: 1991
- Country: United States
- Part of: Virginia
- Other regions in Virginia: Appalachian High Country AVA, Middleburg AVA, Monticello AVA, North Fork of Roanoke AVA, Northern Neck George Washington Birthplace AVA, Rocky Knob AVA, Shenandoah Valley AVA, Virginia Peninsula AVA
- Growing season: 233 days
- Climate region: Region II-III
- Heat units: 2,589-3,352 GDD units
- Precipitation (annual average): 37.89 to 39.2 in (962–996 mm)
- Soil conditions: sandy and loamy
- Total area: 436,480 acres (682 sq mi)
- Size of planted vineyards: 70 acres (28 ha)
- No. of vineyards: 3
- Grapes produced: Cabernet Franc, Chardonnay, Merlot, Seyval Blanc
- No. of wineries: 3

Virginia's Eastern Shore is an American Viticultural Area (AVA) located in Accomack and Northampton Counties on the 70-mile long (113 km) Virginia acreage at the southern tip of the 170-mile long (274 km) multi-state Delmarva Peninsula landform. It was established as the nation's 110^{th} and the state's sixth wine appellation on January 2, 1991 by the Bureau of Alcohol, Tobacco and Firearms (ATF), Treasury after reviewing the petition submitted by Mr. James D. Keyes, owner of Accomack Vineyards, at the outset, the sole bonded winery founded in 1987, on behalf of himself and two local growers, proposing a viticultural area to be known as "Virginia's Eastern Shore."

The AVA's climate is characterized by temperate summers and winters, significantly affected by the Chesapeake Bay and the Atlantic Ocean. The soil is deep, sandy loam. As of 2025, three wineries in the AVA, Bloxom Vineyard, Barrel Oak Winery and Chatham Vineyard on Church Creek, produces Cabernet Franc, Chardonnay, Merlot and Seyval Blanc.

== History ==
Accomac County was organized under the provincial Government in the early part of the seventeenth century, and included the present domain of both counties of the area. In 1642 the name of the county was changed to Northampton, and about 1662 the territory was divided, forming the present counties of Accomack and Northampton. The first permanent settler on the Eastern Shore was Thomas Savage, one of the colonists who accompanied Capt. John Smith to Virginia in 1607. In 1619, he settled in what is now known as Savage Neck in Northampton County. The court records at Eastville, the present county seat of Northampton County, date from 1632 without a break, and are said to be the oldest continuous set of court records in the United States.
There is no real history of viticulture on the Eastern Shore until Dr. and Mrs. Geoffrey Gubb planted the first vinifera vines at Onley, Virginia in 1978. Their vineyard now is about 25 acres (10 ha). A year later, James D. and Geraldine R. Keyes planted a test vineyard of 48 vines. They had been told that "it's too hot, too flat and too humid" for vinifera vines so they started cautiously. In 1983, by which time they had satisfied themselves that Virginia's Eastern Shore was indeed a good place for vinifera vines, they planted 1800 vines, mostly Merlot, on two acres (0.81 ha). Subsequently, in 1985, Mr. and Mrs. John W. Wescoat planted about three acres (1.21 ha) each of Cabernet Sauvignon and Chardonnay. Accomack Vineyards, the Shore's first winery, was opened in 1987 by Mr. and Mrs. Keyes.

== Terroir ==
=== Topography ===
The topography is primarily level ranging from 25 to 45 feet (8–14 m) above sea level. No point is higher than 50 feet (15 m), and the terrain is flat or gently sloping. Despite this, the area is fairly well drained by numerous creeks and streamlets, and by the porous material which underlies the soils. By contrast, the Virginia shoreline on the western side of the Chesapeake Bay rises rapidly above 50 feet (15 m) and the terrain is more irregular. The area is located on the southern end of the Delmarva Peninsula.

=== Climate ===
The main factor which influences the climate of the viticultural area is the presence of large bodies of water on both sides of the 6-to-8-mile wide (10–13 km) peninsula. The Atlantic Ocean to the east and Chesapeake Bay to the west provide a moderating influence on temperature within the viticultural area which is not shared by the remainder of Virginia or by the wider portion of the peninsula in Maryland and Delaware to the north. The maximum range of temperature at Wachapreague, within the viticultural area, is 95 °F (35 °C). This may be contrasted with the maximum range of 100 °F (38 °C) at Norfolk, VA, to the southwest of the area, and 105 °F (41 °C). at Pocomoke City, MD, to the north of the area.
The latest spring frost recorded within the viticultural area was on April 11, at Eastville, and the earliest autumn frost was recorded on October 28, in Wachapreague. Just outside the area, Norfolk, VA, has had frosts as late as April 26 in the spring and as early as October 15 in the fall, and Pocomoke City, MD, had its latest spring frost on May 25 and its earliest autumn frost on September 23. The maritime influence is also responsible for breezes which provide air circulation "desirable to minimize fungus problems with the fruit" in the humid summer.
The mean annual rainfall in the area, 39.2 inches (996 mm) at Eastville and 37.89 inches (962 mm) at Wachapreague, is similar to that at Pocomoke City to the north (39.59 inches (1,006 mm)), but substantially less than at Norfolk (49.54 inches (1,258 mm)). The petitioner stated that the months of heaviest rain are July and August. The USDA plant hardiness zones are 8a to 8b.

=== Soils ===
The U.S.D.A. identified two main soil associations in the area, the Bojec-Munden-Molena association, found on the slopes and ridges of the peninsula, and the Nimmo-Munden-Dragston association, round in flatter areas and depressions. Both are mixtures of sandy and loamy soils. The petitioner did not present any evidence concerning the soils to the north in Maryland.

== See also ==
- Virginia Wine
- List of wineries in Virginia
