= Valhalla Vineyards =

Vineyard and winery in Roanoke, Virginia, US

Coordinates: 37°13′27″N 80°03′20″W

- Location: Roanoke, Virginia, USA
- Founded: 1994
- First vintage: 1998
- Key people: Debra Vascik, winemaker Jim Vascik, vineyard manager
- Known for: Gotterdammerung; Valkyrie
- Varietals: Cabernet Franc, Cabernet Sauvignon, Merlot, Norton (grape), Sangiovese, Viognier, Petit Verdot, Syrah, Chardonnay, Malbec
- Tasting: Open to the Public
- Website: www.valhallawines.com

Valhalla Vineyards is a vineyard and winery located in Roanoke County, Virginia, founded by James and Debra Vascik in 1994.

== History ==
The Vasciks paid $1.2 million for the 200-acre (81 ha) property in 1993. Planting of the Valhalla vineyard began in 1994 on 21 acres (8.5 ha) of converted peach orchard. Construction on the winery building and 200-foot (61 m) wine cave began in 1996.

The winery's first vintage was in 1998 and released in 2000. Valhalla was one of two Virginia vineyards to process its grapes underground in 1998. The vineyard uses a "gravity flow" system in which grapes are pressed through holes in the roof of the winery, which is set into the hillside. The goal of this pump-free process is to prevent damage to the grapes.

Valhalla Vineyards has primarily received attention for their red wines, such as the Götterdämmerung Cabernet Franc/Merlot blend. Their 1999 Syrah was praised by Wine Spectator as being the best of its class from Virginia and the US South.
