= Breaux Vineyards =

Winery and vineyard in Purcellville, Virginia, U.S.

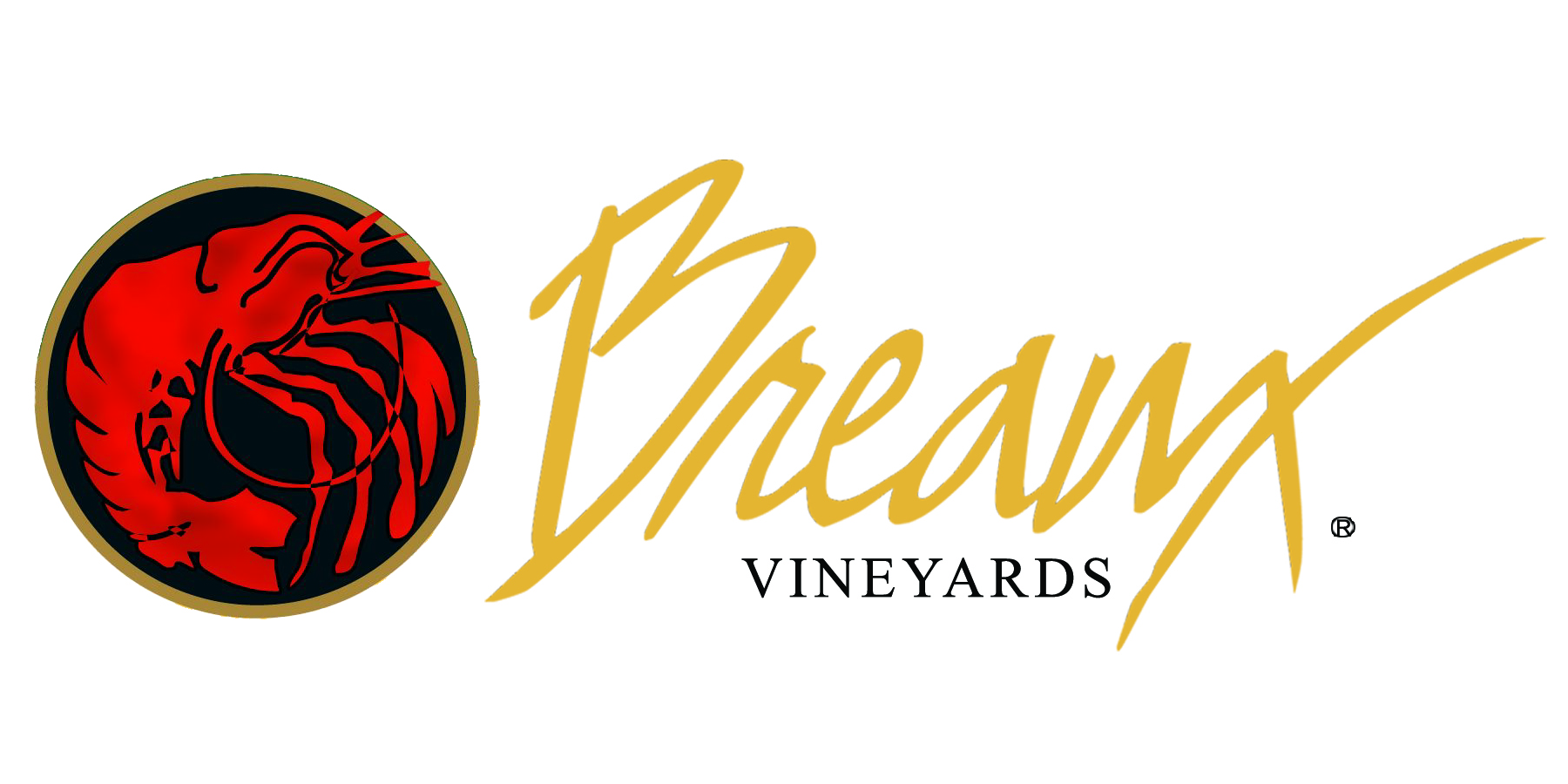
- Location: Loudoun County, Purcellville, Virginia, United States
- Appellation: Virginia wine
- First vintage: 1997
- Key people: E. Paul Breaux, Jr., President & CEO; Jennifer Breaux Blosser, Director of Sales; Christopher Blosser, General Manager
- Cases/yr: 10,000–12,000
- Known for: Breaux Viognier, Breaux Nebbiolo
- Distribution: International
- Tasting: Open to public, 7 days a week
- Website: Breaux Vineyards

Breaux Vineyards is a Cajun owned and operated winery and vineyard located in Purcellville, Loudoun County, Virginia. Founded by E. Paul Breaux, Jr. in 1997, the 100% estate grown winery was one of three United States wineries (and the only Virginia Winery) to be named in the book "250 Best Wines 2012" by Oz Clarke for their Viognier, which landed at #87 in the publication. Breaux Vineyards is one of Virginia's largest grape growers & suppliers of wine grapes, bulk juice, and bulk wine to other East Coast U.S. wineries. The company logo is a red Crawfish, which pays homage to the Breaux family's Cajun heritage because they are often used in the local Cajun cuisine in Louisiana.

== History ==
In 1994 the 404 acre property in Loudoun County, Virginia, known as "Grand Oak Farm" was purchased by E. Paul Breaux, Jr., President and CEO of Sun Realty of Nags Head, Inc. At the time of purchase there were 0.6 acres of Cabernet Sauvignon vines that had been planted in 1985 by David Collins, an independent vineyard consultant and winemaker for Willowcroft Farm Vineyards in Leesburg, Virginia. 2 years later the Breaux family started expanding the vineyard with the assistance of Collins, who would later be hired by Breaux Vineyards to be the head winemaker and vineyard manager. Breaux Vineyards, Ltd. was incorporated in 1997, and the vineyard was expanded from less than 1 acre of cultivated vines in 1996 to 105 acres in 2011. In 2005 E. Paul Breaux, Jr. turned over day-to-day operations to his daughter Jennifer Breaux Blosser and her husband Christopher Blosser, although Breaux maintained the title of CEO for Breaux Vineyards. In the spring of 2011 David Collins left the company to co-found his own project in Rohrersville, Maryland, called "Big Cork Vineyards". He was replaced at Breaux Vineyards by David Pagan Castaño, of Spain.

== Viticulture ==
The vineyard is a single contiguous property of 105 acres of vines under cultivation for the sole purpose of wine grape production. The soil compositions are mostly Eubanks loam with slopes of varying grades that range between 2 and 15% (57% are 2–7% grading, and 31% are 7–15% grading).

Eighteen different grape varieties are planted, including 9 white wine grape varieties, and 9 red wine grape varieties. The largest plantings on the property are dedicated to Cabernet Sauvignon (19.5 acres), Vidal blanc (18 acres), and Merlot (17.5 acres).

A combination of Lyre and VSP (Vertical Shoot Positioning) vine training systems are used on the property. Breaux Vineyards uses an integrated pest and disease management system due to the demanding and difficult grape growing conditions in Northern Virginia. All vines are maintained and harvested by hand, with mechanization being used for vine spraying and canopy management.

== Winemaking ==
The winery is equipped with modern winemaking equipment including: 50,000 gallons of wine capacity within their German-manufactured temperature controlled tanks, a full sized Italian bottling line, a large hydraulic bladder grape press, several grape crusher destemmers, a temperature-controlled grape receiving room/crush pad, and a humidity and temperature-controlled barrel room housing their over 500 wine barrels.

== Grapes and wines ==
Breaux Vineyards produces between 20-26 wines per year for themselves broken into two types of labels, and potentially many more depending on custom crush contracts where they produce wines for other wineries.

The winery currently produces around 12,000 cases (144,000 bottles) per year.

=== Grapes grown ===
1. Barbera
2. Cabernet Franc
3. Cabernet Sauvignon
4. Chambourcin
5. Malbec
6. Merlot
7. Nebbiolo
8. Petit Verdot
9. Syrah
10. Chardonnay
11. Muscat blanc
12. Muscat Giallo
13. Muscat Orange
14. Sauvignon blanc
15. Semillon
16. Seyval blanc
17. Vidal blanc
18. Viognier

== Awards ==
- Breaux Viognier: 1 of only 3 United States wines to be named to Oz Clarke's list of the "250 Best Wines 2012", with a placement of #87 in the top 100 section of the publication.
- Awarded a Silver Medal at the 2013 "Concours Mondial du Sauvignon" (translated to 'World Contest of Sauvignon') with the 2012 Breaux Vineyards Sauvignon Blanc, which was the only wine from North America to win a medal in that competition.
- Voted in 1st place as "Virginia's Favorite Winery" in 2011.
- Voted in 1st place as "Virginia's Favorite Winery" in 2010.
- Voted in 1st place as "Virginia's Favorite Winery" in 2009.
- Voted in 1st place as "Virginia's Favorite Winery" in 2008.
- Named Best Virginia Winery in 2011 by Northern Virginia Magazine.
