= Rocky Knob AVA =

American Viticultural Area in Virginia

Coordinates: 36°47′39″N 80°23′43″W

Rocky Knob
- Wine region
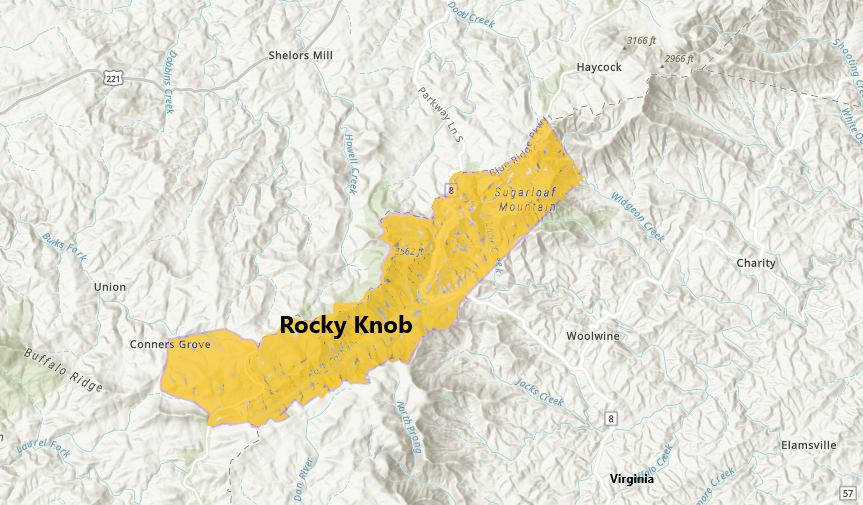
- Type: American Viticultural Area
- Year established: 1983
- Years of wine industry: 50
- Country: United States
- Part of: Virginia
- Other regions in Virginia: Appalachian High Country AVA, Middleburg Virginia AVA, Monticello AVA, North Fork of Roanoke AVA, Northern Neck George Washington Birthplace AVA, Shenandoah Valley AVA, Virginia's Eastern Shore AVA, Virginia Peninsula AVA
- Growing season: 160 days
- Precipitation (annual average): 43.10 in (1,095 mm)
- Soil conditions: silt loam with gravel
- Total area: 9,000 acres (14 sq mi)
- Size of planted vineyards: 15 acres (6 ha)
- No. of vineyards: 3
- Grapes produced: Aglianico, Cabernet Franc, Cabernet Sauvignon, Chambourcin, Chardonnay, Merlot, Riesling, Sangiovese, Seyval Blanc, Vidal Blanc, Viognier
- No. of wineries: 4

Rocky Knob is an American Viticultural Area (AVA) in a mountainous area of southwest Virginia within portions of Floyd and Patrick counties. It is located on the eastern slopes of the Blue Ridge Mountains west and northwest of the towns of Woolwine and Meadows of Dan astride the Blue Ridge Parkway. It was established as the nation's 27^{th} and the state's second appellation on January 12, 1983 by the Bureau of Alcohol, Tobacco and Firearms (ATF), Treasury after reviewing the petition submitted by W.F. Morrisette of Woolwine Winery on behalf of itself and local vintners proposing a viticultural area known as "Rocky Knob."

The viticultural area encompasses 9,000 acres (14 sq mi) and, at the outset, had 15 acres (6 ha) of cultviation under vine. The elevations in Rocky Knob AVA range from 1,600 to 3,574 feet (488–1,089 m) above sea level. Strong winds at these elevations help protect grapes from fungus and mildew conditions. The average rainfall is 43.10 inches (1,095 mm) per year. The soil is primarily well-drained silt loam and gravel. The vineyards are located in hardiness zones 7a and 7b.
The name Rocky Knob is taken from the mountainous recreational area within the viticultural area boundary. Rocky Knob Recreation Area appears on State maps on both sides of the Blue Ridge Parkway, which is the main highway through the scenic Blue Ridge Mountains. The community of Tuggle Gap is located at the north boundary and Rock Castle Gap at the southern boundary of the viticultural area. The petition states that the name Rocky Knob has been in existence since prior to 1770 and is a topographical description of the area.

== Terroir ==
=== Topography ===
The petitioner submitted data to establish a geographically significant viticultural area by reducing the previously proposed 15,000 acres (6,100 ha) area to about 9,000 acres (3,600 ha). The new boundary is generally the mountainous area east of the Blue Ridge Parkway. The elevation varies from 1,600 feet (490 m) at the north boundary in the vicinity of Widgeon Creek to 3,574 feet (1,089 m) at the southern boundary in the vicinity of Hog Mountain. The Rocky Knob viticultural area has a steep drop in elevation to the southeast in the vicinity of Rock Castle Gorge.

=== Climate ===
This area is colder in the spring which forces a later bloom set and causes a growing season about one week later than the surrounding area. This later bloom set allows vines to survive the erratic early spring cold. Also, there is more wind in the area which reduces the chance of a severe frost accumulation. The average rainfall is 43.10 inches (1,095 mm) per year and the average temperature for the growing season, which lasts 160 days, is May 61.2 °F (16.2 °C), June 67.9 °F (19.9 °C), July 71.1 °F (21.7 °C), August 70.0 °F (21.1 °C), September 63.9 °F (17.7 °C), and October 54.3 °F (12.4 °C). Warm days with cool nights are typical during the growing season in the area and provide excellent growing conditions. High winds afford good soil drying conditions which minimize grape diseases.

=== Soils ===
The soil in the area is mostly silt loam combined with gravel which provides the drainage necessary for good grape production. The soils in the area east of the revised boundary is mostly clay which does not provide drainage.

== Viticulture ==
The petitioner states that to the west there are intermittent plateaus of deep loam soil, comprising 4,000 acres (1,600 ha), suitable for viticultural purposes. Two acres (0.81 ha) of grapes were planted in 1976 on top of Sugarloaf Mountain, which is in the Rocky Knob area. This first commercial-planting of wine grapes was experimental and the results were positive.

== See also ==
- Virginia Wine
- List of wineries in Virginia
