= Martha (grape) =

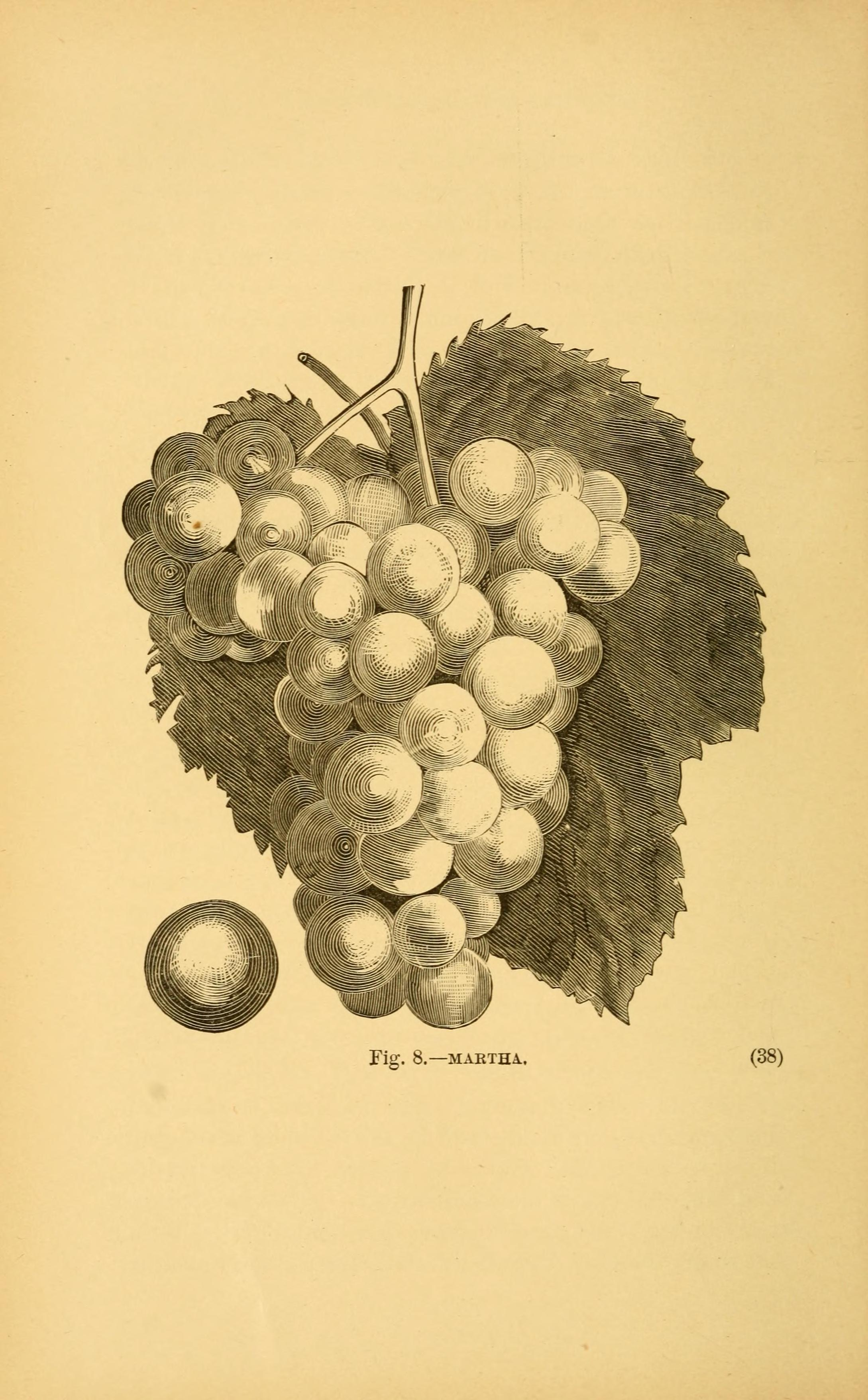

Martha was the most popular white grape variety in the United States at one point in the second half of the 19th century.

== History ==
This “Miller Hybrid” was bred by a Samuel Miller in Calmdale, Lebanon County, Pennsylvania before he moved to Bluffton in 1867, from a Concord seed he had obtained from E. W. Bull. It was released around 1868 by J. Knox of Pittsburgh, Pennsylvania. Valued characteristics at the time were its vigor, hardiness, and resistance, as well as the early ripening time, and good fruit quality. From 1869 through 1899, the American Pomological Society had recommended its cultivation. By the beginning of the 20th century, it had largely disappeared from cultivation. In southern states it persisted somewhat longer. Reasons given for the decline in interest were its poor transportability and shelf life. Its most notable descendant is probably Elvira, whose descendants include popular Japanese table grapes and which was also used as breeding stock by Albert Seibel.

== Description ==
Compared to its mother, the plant is less robust, flowers and fruits earlier, and the berries taste less foxy. It is overall quite robust, but can be somewhat susceptible to mildew under unfavorable conditions. The leaves are light green on top and heavily pubescent on the underside. The hermaphrodite flowers bloom at mid-season. Productivity is moderate. The berries appear in medium-sized, single-shouldered clusters that are slightly smaller than those of Concord. They have a thin light green skin with a yellow tinge that is covered with a thin gray wax bloom. The translucent yellowish-green flesh is juicy, sweet, and slightly tarter deeper inside.

== Literature ==
- Ulysses Prentiss Hedrick, Nathaniel Ogden Booth: The grapes of New York, pages 341–2
- Bush & Son & Meissner: Illustrated descriptive catalogue of American grape vines. A grape growers' manual, 1895, pages 152–3
