= Monticello Wine Company =

Winery in Charlottesville, Virginia, US

Coordinates: 38.0358°N 78.4782°W

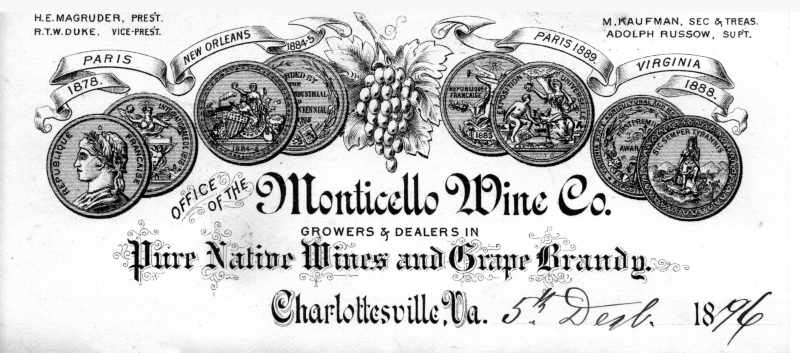
- Location: Charlottesville, Virginia, USA
- Founded: 1873
- Key people: Adolph Russow
- Known for: Virginia Claret
- Varietals: Norton, Catawba, Delaware
- Other products: Virginia grape brandy

The Monticello Wine Company was a Charlottesville, Virginia cooperative founded in 1873 by local grape growers, led by a German, Oscar Reierson. Its four-story winery had a capacity of 200,000 gallons, and was located at the end of Wine Street, near Hedge Street. It was the largest winery in the South. It shut down with the onset of Prohibition in Virginia, which took effect on November 1, 1916.

The Monticello Wine Company building.

The success of Monticello Wine Company brought Charlottesville to declare itself "the Capital of the Wine Belt in Virginia." The company was best known for its Virginia Claret Wine, produced with Norton grapes—it "won a major international award in 1873 at the Vienna Exposition." It was located in what is now the Monticello American Viticultural Area.
