= Monticello AVA =

American Viticultural Area in Virginia

Coordinates: 37°57′17″N 78°30′20″W

Monticello
- Wine region
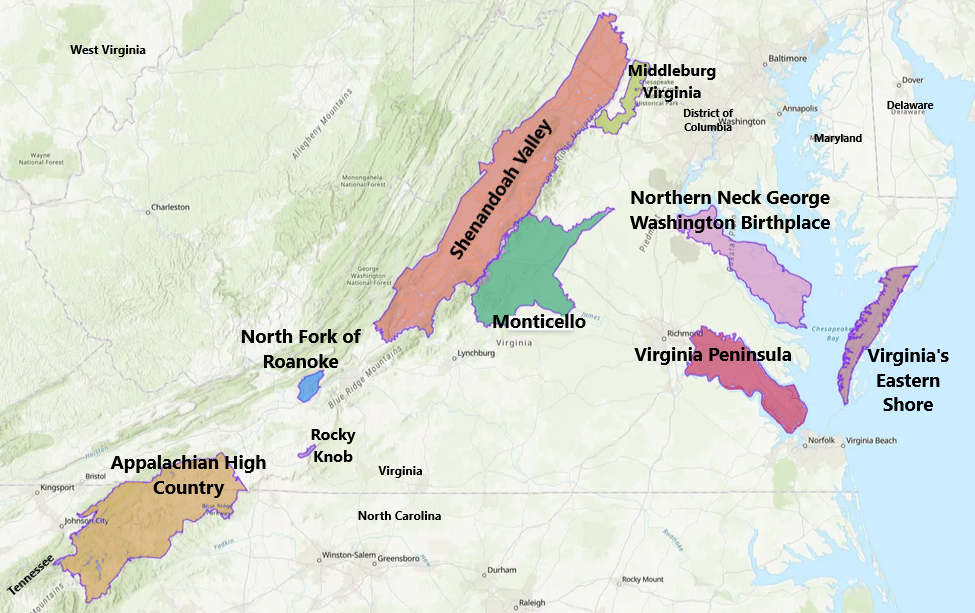
- Type: American Viticultural Area
- Year established: 1984; 1987 Amend; 2019 Amend
- Years of wine industry: 252
- Country: United States
- Part of: Virginia
- Other regions in Virginia: Appalachian High Country AVA, Middleburg Virginia AVA, North Fork of Roanoke AVA, Northern Neck George Washington Birthplace AVA, Rocky Knob AVA, Shenandoah Valley AVA, Virginia's Eastern Shore AVA, Virginia Peninsula AVA
- Growing season: 220–250 days
- Precipitation (annual average): 39.4–44.0 inches (1,001–1,118 mm)
- Soil conditions: Granite-based clay loam
- Total area: 800,000 acres (1,250 sq mi); 2019:106,000 added acres (166 sq mi)
- Size of planted vineyards: 450 acres (182 ha)
- No. of vineyards: 28+
- Grapes produced: Cabernet Franc, Cabernet Sauvignon, Chambourcin, Chardonnay, Gewurztraminer, Malbec, Merlot, Muscat Canelli, Muscat of Alexandria, Norton, Orange Muscat, Petit Manseng, Petit Verdot, Pinot gris, Pinot noir, Riesling, Rkatsiteli, Sauvignon blanc, Seyval blanc, Syrah, Tannat, Touriga Nacional, Traminette, Vidal blanc, Viognier, Zinfandel
- No. of wineries: 30+

Monticello is an American Viticultural Area (AVA) located in the central Piedmont region of the Commonwealth of Virginia. It was established as the nation's 58^{th} and the state's fourth wine appellation on January 23, 1984 by the Bureau of Alcohol, Tobacco and Firearms (ATF) after reviewing the petition submitted by six wine grape growers in the Charlottesville area proposing a viticultural area to be known as "Monticello."

The name "Monticello" (//mɑntɪˈtʃɛloʊ// mon-tuh-CHEL-oh) is known nationally and locally as the historic home of Thomas Jefferson, located near the center of the area. Monticello AVA includes most of Albemarle, Fluvanna, Greene, Orange, and Nelson counties. The area is nestled along the eastern slopes of the Blue Ridge Mountains and encompasses the small ridge known as the Southwest Mountains. There are approximately 30 varieties of grapes grown in the Monticello AVA. However, the most notable grapes grown in the area include Cabernet Franc, Chardonnay and Viognier. In 2019, the Alcohol and Tobacco Tax and Trade Bureau (TTB) granted a petition to expand the AVA by approximately 106,240 acres (166 sq mi) into Fluvanna County.

== History ==
The earliest recorded attempts at winemaking in the area occurred in the 1770s, when Thomas Jefferson provided financial support to Italian winemaker, Filippo Mazzei, who made a small quantity of wine from the native grapes, but without much success. Jefferson gave Mazzei significant acreage less than 1 mile (1.6 km) south of Monticello for the purpose of growing grapes. The area was planted in 1774. In 1776, with the advent of the Revolutionary war, Jefferson and George Washington dispatched Mazzei back to Italy to solicit war funding from the Duke of Tuscany. As was the practice at that time, Mazzei rented his home, in this instance to the Hessian cavalry officer Friedrich Adolf Riedesel, a prisoner of war who had been captured at Saratoga and was imprisoned in the Charlottesville barracks. Riedesel moved his entire staff up to Mazzei's home and turned their horses out to pasture in the infant vineyards. The vineyards were destroyed.

== Terroir ==
The geographical features of gaps in the Blue Ridge Mountains to the east causes "rivers of cold air" to flow through corridors that converge east of the Monticello AVA. It is manifested by the tendency of the cool air to sink along the surrounding topography and drain to the surface of the valley floors. This atmospheric phenomenon draws warmer air closer to the ground and reduces the incidence of frost damage. As a result, the climate is favorable to viticulture in Monticello AVA where temperatures are 4 to 5 °F (2 to 3 °C) warmer than the surrounding areas. The warmer weather produces a longer growing season and protection from vine-freeze which can be fatal to ripening grapes. The season is a minimum of 190–200 day average in the AVA compared to areas further east and south that average 150 days and less. To maximize vine protection, vignerons selected sites with sunny, south-easterly exposure at 800 feet (244 m) and above between the mountain slopes. The USDA plant hardiness zones range from 6a to 7b.

== See also ==
- Virginia Wine
- List of wineries in Virginia
