= Piedmont region of Virginia =

Region of Virginia, US

Coordinates: 38°24′28.9″N 77°43′6.5″W

The Piedmont region of Virginia is a part of the greater Piedmont physiographic region, which stretches from the falls of the Potomac, Rappahannock, and James Rivers to the Blue Ridge Mountains. The region runs across the middle of the state from north to south, expanding outward to a width of nearly 190 miles at the border with North Carolina. To the north, the region continues from Virginia into central Maryland and southeastern Pennsylvania.

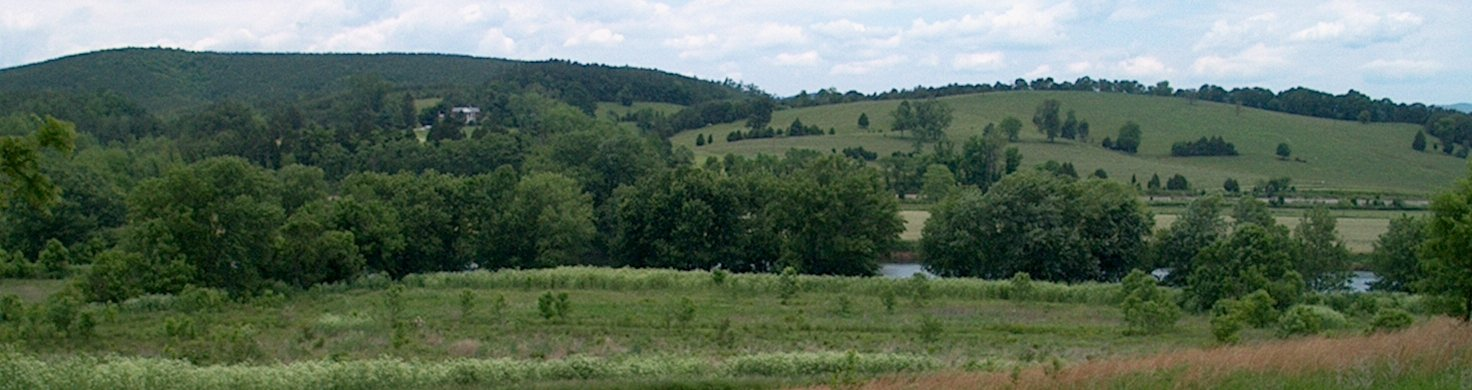
The James River winds its way among the rolling hills of the Piedmont region.

== Counties in the region ==
The following counties are located within the Piedmont region of the state. There are 32 counties.

- Albemarle
- Amelia
- Amherst
- Appomattox
- Bedford
- Buckingham
- Brunswick
- Campbell
- Charlotte
- Culpeper
- Cumberland
- Fauquier
- Fluvanna
- Franklin
- Goochland
- Greene
- Halifax
- Henry
- Loudoun
- Louisa
- Lunenburg
- Madison
- Mecklenburg
- Nelson
- Nottoway
- Orange
- Patrick
- Pittsylvania
- Powhatan
- Prince Edward
- Rappahannock
- Spotsylvania

== Overview ==
The Virginia Piedmont is largely characterized by rolling hills and numerous ridges near the boundary with the Blue Ridge Mountains. Lying between the mountain and coastal plain regions, the Piedmont region is a naturally diverse landscape. The bedrock consists mostly of gneiss, schist, and granite rocks at a typical depth of between 2 and 10 feet. Soils developed from these rocks and minerals form acid, infertile soils, with sandy loam surfaces. Many of the clayey subsoils are red or yellowish red due to the oxidized iron weathered from the primary minerals. Natural fertility is low; nonetheless, these soils respond well to liming and fertilization. Historically, much of the Piedmont region was cleared and farmed intensively, causing extreme erosion over much of the region. Before modern soil fertility and managerial practices were adapted to these soils, agricultural production diminished and most farms reverted to forests. Over two thirds of this region is wooded today. The best soils are still agriculturally productive through well managed soil fertility and erosion control plans. The region contains several areas and stretches of land that are of relatively high agricultural value.

== See also ==
- Piedmont (United States)
