= Shenandoah Valley AVA =

American Viticultural Area in Virginia and West Virginia

Coordinates: 38°24′22″N 78°59′55″W

Shenandoah Valley
- Wine region
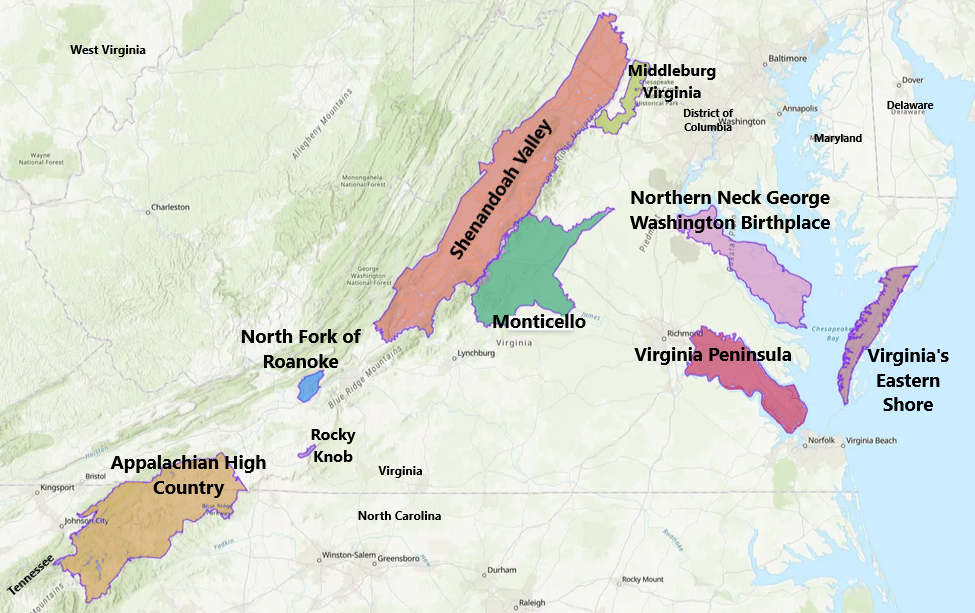
- Type: American Viticultural Area
- Year established: 1982
- Years of wine industry: 50
- Country: United States
- Part of: Virginia (VA), West Virginia (WV)
- Climate region: Region V
- Heat units: 4,344 to 4,866 GDD units
- Precipitation (annual average): 33.8 to 37.7 in (860–960 mm)
- Total area: 2.4 million acres (3,750 sq mi)
- Size of planted vineyards: VA: 216 acres (87 ha); WV: 30 acres (12 ha)
- No. of vineyards: 22
- Grapes produced: Cabernet Franc, Chambourcin, Chardonnay, Gewurztraminer, Riesling, Traminette, Viognier, Norton, Cabernet Sauvignon, Merlot
- No. of wineries: 11

Shenandoah Valley is an American Viticultural Area (AVA) located in the Shenandoah Valley of Virginia and West Virginia. The valley is bounded by the Blue Ridge Mountains to the east and the Appalachian and Allegheny Plateaus to the west. It was established as the nation's 25^{th} and Virginia's initial appellation on December 28, 1982 by the Bureau of Alcohol, Tobacco and Firearms (ATF), Treasury after reviewing the petition submitted in August 1981 by the Shenandoah Vineyards in Edinburg, Virginia, on behalf of themselves and local vintners, proposing a viticultural area in the countries of Frederick, Clarke, Warren, Shenandoah, Page, Rockingham, Augusta, Rockbridge, Botetourt and Amherst in Virginia, and the counties of Berkeley and Jefferson in West Virginia, to be named "Shenandoah Valley."

Most of the 2.4-million-acre (3,750 sq mi) appellation lies in Virginia with a small portion in the Eastern Panhandle of West Virginia. At the outset, there were approximately 116 acres (47 ha) of cultivation with 100 additional acres (40 ha) planned for 1982 in the Virginia portion of the area and approximately 13 acres (5.3 ha) with 17 additional acres (6.9 ha) for 1982 in the West Virginia portion. Within the AVA, there was also 7 commercial vineyards and 3 wineries in Virginia and 9 vineyards and 3 wineries in the West Virginia portion.

Similarly, the majority of vineyard acreage is located in Virginia and grow a wide variety of Vitis vinifera, Vitis labrusca, and French hybrid grapes. The USDA plant hardiness zones range from 6a to 7b where the area is mainly 7a. Limestone soil, which is common to the Valley, has been long associated with great wine growing regions in Europe. The AVA's climate allows grapes to attain higher acidity, generally regarded as good in wine. The cooler, relatively dry climate, soil composition and position between two mountain chains makes the Shenandoah Valley more ideal for viticulture than any of the state's other regions. The Shenandoah Valley is relatively dry, a "rain shadow" between the Blue Ridge and Allegheny Mountains; the annual rainfall in the Valley is one half that of the Virginia average. The growing season in the valley is distinctly warmer and drier than in neighboring Virginia regions, which don't have the natural rain barrier from the nearby mountains and where, east of the Blue Ridge, vineyard soils are primarily clay and loam. The conditions in the Shenandoah Valley AVA are thus more hospitable than those east of the mountains for Cabernet Franc, Chambourcin, Cabernet Sauvignon, Lemberger, Petit Manseng, Petit Verdot, Pinot Noir, and Riesling.

== Wineries and vineyards ==
Wine producers in the AVA include: (from north to south)

- Veramar Vineyard
- James Charles Winery & Vineyard
- Valerie Hill Vineyard & Winery
- North Mountain Vineyard & Winery
- Muse Vineyards
- Shenandoah Vineyards
- Wolf Gap Vineyard
- Cave Ridge Vineyard,
- The Winery at Kindred Pointe
- DeMello Vineyards
- Old Hill Cidery
- Wisteria Farm & Vineyard
- CrossKeys Vineyards
- Bluestone Vineyard
- Marceline Vineyards
- Barren Ridge Vineyards
- Ox-Eye Vineyards
- Above Ground Winery
- Hunt's Vineyard,
- Rockbridge Vineyard,
- Jump Mountain Vineyard,
- Lexington Valley Vineyard
- Blue Ridge Vineyard.
- Briedé Family Vineyards

== See also ==
- Virginia Wine
- List of wineries in Virginia
