= John Redd Hutcheson =

American politician

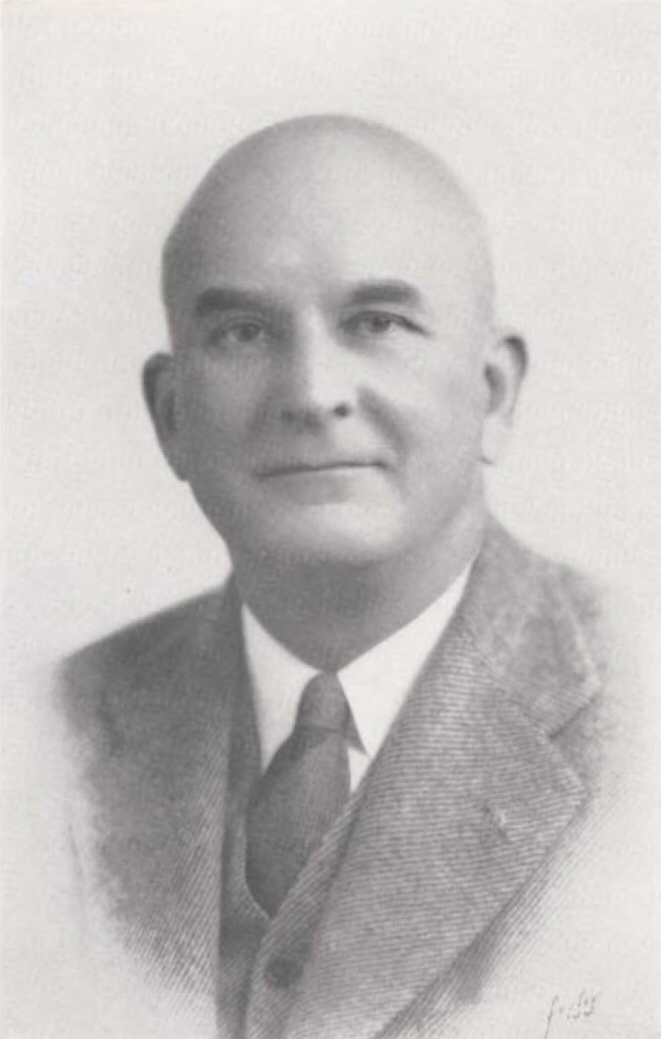

9th President of Virginia Polytechnic Institute
- In office 1945–1947
- Preceded by: Julian Ashby Burruss
- Succeeded by: Walter Stephenson Newman

Personal details
- Born: January 13, 1886 Charlotte Court House, Virginia
- Died: January 23, 1962 (aged 76) Blacksburg, Virginia

John Redd Hutcheson (January 13, 1886 – January 23, 1962) was the ninth president of Virginia Tech.

== Early life and education ==
Hutcheson was born to Robert Francis Hutcheson and Mary Claiborne Barksdale on January 13, 1886, near Charlotte Courthouse, Virginia. He earned a B.S. in 1907 and M.S. in 1909, both from Virginia Agricultural and Mechanical College and Polytechnic Institute (VPI; later Virginia Tech). He also received an honorary D.Sci degree from Clemson College in 1937 and D.Agric. from North Carolina State College in 1947. Hutcheson also attended field artillery officer training school during World War I.

== Career ==
Hutcheson taught and served as principal in schools in Virginia and Mississippi and taught at the University of Virginia before joining VPI at the Virginia Agricultural Extension Service as a livestock specialist in 1914. He became its director in 1919, serving until his appointment as executive assistant to President Burruss in 1945.

After Burruss became ill, Hutcheson began acting on his behalf, until being officially appointed president on August 14, 1945. Shortly after he took over the presidency, Japan surrendered to end World War II, and a two-day celebration ensued. When the fall quarter began soon thereafter, enrollment nearly doubled that of the previous quarter. The veterans generally had no interest in joining the corps of cadets, and for the first time, during winter quarter 1946, civilians outnumbered cadets on campus.

With this increase in the student population came a need for additional student housing. The college installed a trailer court for married students that they called "Vetsville" surrounding the historic Solitude farm house, which was converted into a community center for the residents. Two additional trailer courts that students called Cassell Heights after financial and business manager Stuart K. Cassell followed in the area east of present-day Cassell Coliseum. The college also rented space in the barracks at the Radford Arsenal to house other students and converted several buildings there into classrooms with the new location called "Rad-Tech."

In 1946, the Board of Visitors created a vice president position, filled by Walter S. Newman, to develop the curriculum. Hutcheson created an office of admissions to assist C. P. “Sally” Miles, dean of the college, with the thousands of applications for admission that poured into the school.

During Hutcheson's tenure, VPI added a Master of Science in applied mechanics, resumed activities including football and student organizations that had been dropped during World War II, and created an office of student affairs. The Board of Visitors approved the final plans for the alumni war memorial and mall leading to the memorial, now the iconic War Memorial Chapel and Alumni Mall. The school received the first invitation ever issued to a Virginia college team to play in a bowl game, the Sun Bowl on New Year's Day in 1947.

In December 1946, Hutcheson became ill, and in May 1947 Newman was named acting president. Although Hutcheson recovered, the Board voted on August 12 to relieve him of his presidential duties, appointed him as the first university chancellor, and named Newman president, effective September 1, 1947.

In 1948 Hutcheson became president of the newly established VPI Educational Foundation. He retired as chancellor in 1956 to devote full attention to the foundation, which he served until his death on January 23, 1962.

== Personal life ==
Hutcheson married Eleanor Parrott in 1917, and they had three children: Eleanor Barksdale, John Redd Jr., and Robert Parrott Hutcheson. Robert died in World War II, and Eleanor married Charles Catlett, III.

John Redd Hutcheson and his brother Thomas Barksdale Hutcheson inherited the Barksdale family's farm, Edgemont Farm. John supervised the farm, along with other family members, from 1950 until 1962, when full supervision was turned over to T. B. Hutcheson Jr.

== Honors ==
Hutcheson Hall, an academic building on the Virginia Tech Campus is named in honor of Hutcheson and his brother Thomas B. Hutcheson.
