= Joseph Dupuy Eggleston =

American university president (1867–1953)

Joseph Dupuy Eggleston II
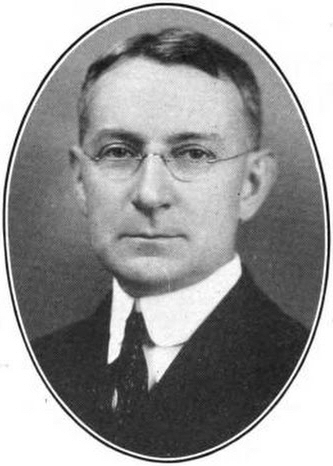

14th President of Hampden-Sydney College
- In office 1919–1939

7th President of Virginia Agricultural and Mechanical College and Polytechnic Institute
- In office July 1, 1913 – July 1, 1919
- Preceded by: Paul Brandon Barringer
- Succeeded by: Julian Ashby Burruss

Personal details
- Born: November 13, 1867 Prince Edward County, Virginia, US
- Died: March 13, 1953 (aged 85) Hampden-Sydney, Virginia, US
- Spouse: Julia Johnson
- Education: Hampden-Sydney College

Joseph Dupuy Eggleston II (November 13, 1867 – March 15, 1953) was an American educator, the seventh president of Virginia Agricultural and Mechanical College and Polytechnic Institute (now Virginia Tech), and the 14th president of Hampden-Sydney College. Eggleston also served as a public school teacher and administrator and as the chief of the Division of Rural Education for the United States Bureau of Education.

== Early life ==
Eggleston was born to Dr. Joseph Eggleston and Ann Carrington on November 13, 1867, in Prince Edward County, Virginia. He attended Prince Edward Academy and then Hampden-Sydney College in Hampden-Sydney, Virginia, where he received a Bachelor of Arts degree in 1886 and later a Master's Degree.

== Career ==
=== Public school career ===
From 1886 until 1889, Eggleston served as a public school teacher in Virginia, Georgia, and North Carolina. He taught high school in Asheville, North Carolina, until 1893 when he became superintendent of the public schools in Asheville. He continued in this position until 1900. Two years later Eggleston was appointed as the editor and secretary of the Bureau of Information and Publicity of the Southern Education Board at the University of Tennessee. In this position, he was "charged with studying education conditions with the goal of improving social, economic, and cultural circumstances in the South by improving the quality of education throughout the region." In 1903, Eggleston returned to Prince Edward County to serve as the superintendent of schools until he became the first elected State Superintendent of Virginia public schools, a position he held from 1906 until 1912. Eggleston then briefly served as chief of the Division of Rural Education in the U.S. Bureau of Education from January to July 1913 before accepting the presidency of Virginia Agricultural and Mechanical College and Polytechnic Institute.

==== The Work of the Rural School ====
In 1913, Eggleston published The Work of the Rural School. The book is an in-depth study (with images) of rural schools in the United States. Eggleston, throughout the book, discusses what rural schools were like at the time, as well as proposed changes needed. Eggleston used many of his own experiences as a guide in writing the book; for example, Chapter XIV is entitled, "The State Superintendent of Public Instruction," and is an in depth study into the position and how it operates (pulling from his own experiences as state superintendent of Virginia).

=== President of Virginia Agricultural and Mechanical College and Polytechnic Institute ===
Eggleston served as president of Virginia Agricultural and Mechanical College and Polytechnic Institute (now known as Virginia Tech) from 1913 until his resignation in 1919. He served as president during World War I when a Reserve Officer Training Corps (ROTC) unit was established at the school, and the school "became a national training center for war." In an attempt to help the war effort, Eggleston "offered the services of the university's extension service to the Federal Food Commission, to promote food production and conservation."

=== President of Hampden-Sydney College ===
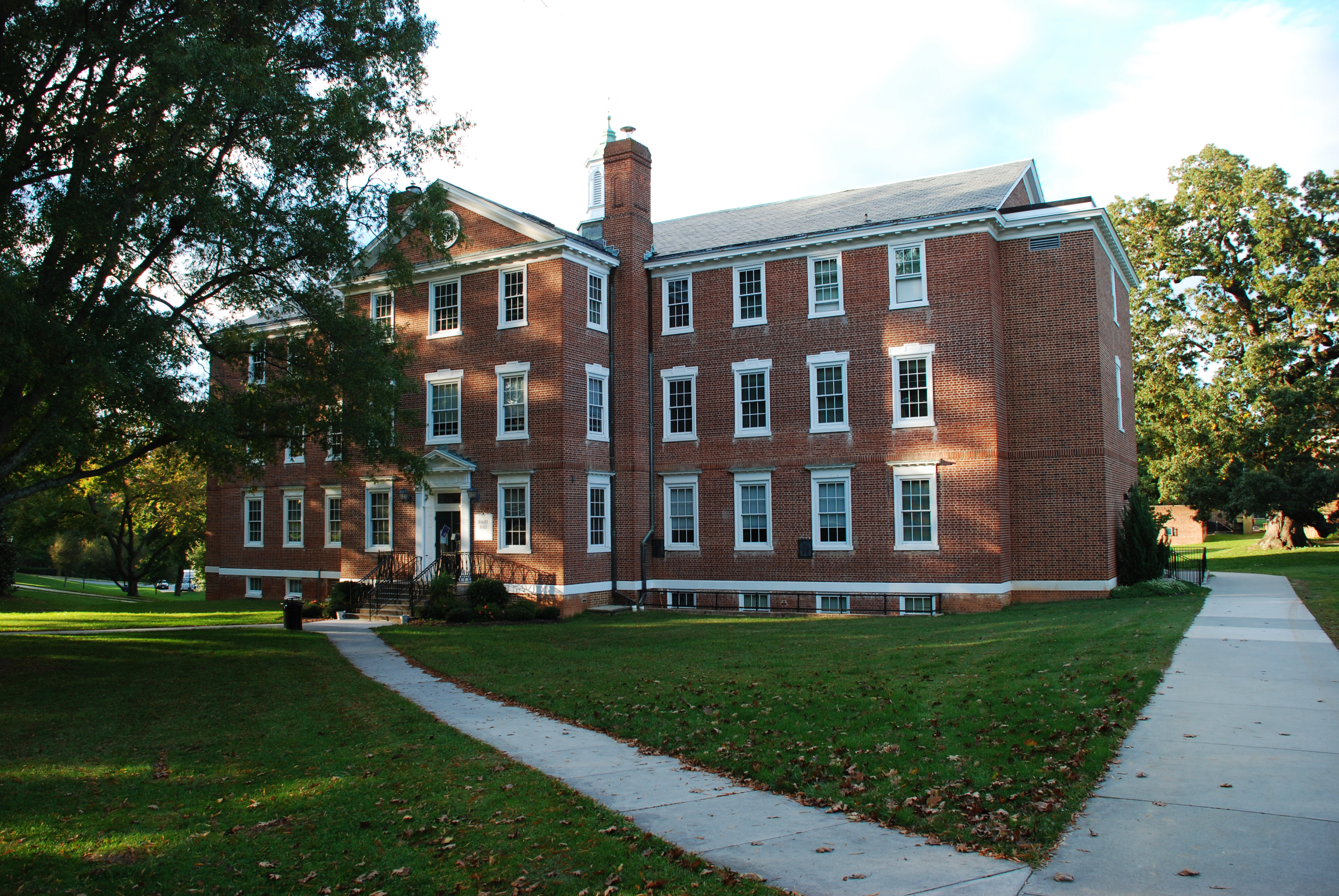
Bagby Hall — built under Eggleston's tutelage

Eggleston served as president of Hampden-Sydney College from 1919 until 1939. During his 20-year term as president of the college, Eggleston brought various innovations to the administration of the school. For example, he hired a full-time business manager, instituted an annual budget, and had a dean deal with student issues. Under Eggleston's leadership the school saw a new "building entirely for the sciences Bagby Hall) . . . . [Eggleston also] persuaded a descendant of one of the founding Trustees to give a building (Morton Hall) in memory of his ancestor - the most generous gift the College ever received." While Eggleston was president of Hampden-Sydney, Virginia Tech invited him to be the commencement speaker in 1939. He retired as president in 1935, staying on four years until a successor was found.

== Personal life ==
Eggleston married Julia Johnson in Farmville, Virginia, on December 18, 1895, and the couple had two children: Elizabeth Carrington Eggleston and Joseph DuPuy Eggleston, III.

Dr. Eggleston became an enthusiast of Prince Edward County history and family genealogy. His collection of notes and research on many Southside Virginia families can be viewed at the library of the Virginia Museum of History and Culture, previously the Virginia Historical Society (VHS). Eggleston was the president of VHS from 1938-1943.

Eggleston served as State President of the Virginia Society of the Sons of the American Revolution from 1930 to 1931.

== Death ==
After retirement, Eggleston continued to live on campus at Hampden-Sydney College. He died March 13, 1953.

== Legacy ==
Eggleston dedicated his entire life to education. In fact, volume 24, issue seven of American Education, which hosts a picture of Eggleston along with his name and position as president of Hampden-Sydney on its cover, notes that, "[e]ducation as a life work strongly appealed to Dr. Eggleston even in his youth." Only two years into his presidency at Hampden-Sydney College, it was noted that he was, "widely and favorably known as an expert in school affairs, and his services [were] constantly in demand in educational gatherings." While Eggleston was state superintendent of public education in Virginia, he revolutionized the state education system, making it an organized system. In fact, Eggleston left the public school system in Virginia "thoroughly co-ordinated, with better school buildings, longer terms, more efficient teachers, increased salaries, more school libraries, with abundant high schools in every section . . . . [T]he result he left [was] a thoroughly developed school system." This theme of innovation in education continued through his terms as president of Virginia Tech and of Hampden-Sydney. Eggleston's life was one devoted to education and the improvement of its instruction.

== Honors ==
In 1952, a three-winged residence hall constructed by the Federal Works Agency between 1935 and 1940 at Virginia Tech was named for Eggleston.

== See also ==
- List of Hampden-Sydney College alumni

Preceded by Paul Brandon Barringer; 1907–1913	Virginia Tech president 1913 – 1919	Succeeded by Julian Burruss; 1919–1945
Preceded by Henry Tucker Graham; 1909–1917	Hampden-Sydney College president 1919 – 1939	Succeeded by Edward Graham Gammon; 1939–1955
