= Virginia Tech Institute for Policy and Governance =

Research center in Blacksburg, Virginia, US

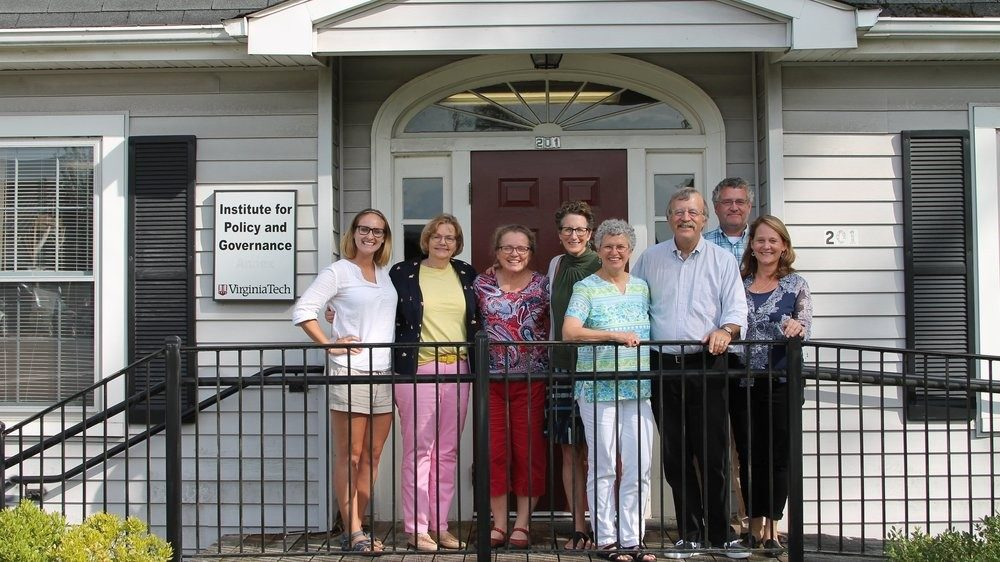
- Motto: Ut Prosim (Latin)
- Motto in English: That I May Serve
- Established: 2006
- Affiliations: Virginia Tech
- Director: Max Stephenson, Jr.
- Location: Blacksburg, Alexandria, in Virginia, United States
- Website: www.ipg.vt.edu

The Virginia Tech Institute for Policy and Governance (VTIPG) is a major research center that serves federal government agencies, the Commonwealth of Virginia and local governments as well as nonprofit/civil society organizations, domestically and internationally.

== Introduction ==
The Institute seeks to improve the response of governments and nonprofit institutions to an array of policy concerns including those linked to healthcare, human services, workforce and community change. To address these goals, VTIPG engages in an active program of policy research, capacity building and technical assistance involving faculty and graduate students. The Institute engages with federal and state agencies, foundations, nonprofit organizations, local governments, and the general public by sharing its research findings in a variety of ways and involving these entities in its work where appropriate.

== See also ==
- Virginia Tech
- College of Architecture and Urban Studies
- Virginia Tech School of Public and International Affairs
