= Julian Ashby Burruss =

First president of James Madison University

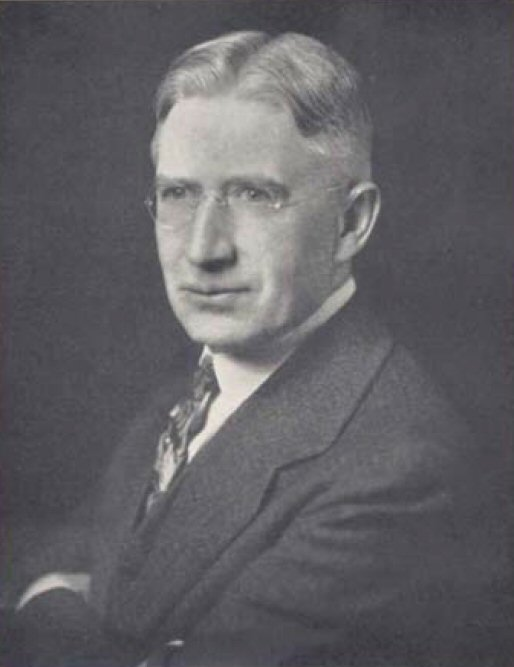

8th President of Virginia Polytechnic Institute and State University
- In office 1919–1945
- Preceded by: Joseph Dupuy Eggleston
- Succeeded by: John Redd Hutcheson

1st President of James Madison University
- In office 1908–1919
- Succeeded by: Samuel Page Duke

Personal details
- Born: August 16, 1876 Richmond, Virginia, U.S.
- Died: January 4, 1947 (aged 70) Staunton, Virginia, U.S.
- Spouse: Rachel Cleveland Ebbert
- Children: 2
- Education: Virginia Tech

Julian Ashby Burruss (August 16, 1876 – January 4, 1947) was the first President of James Madison University, although at the time of his service the university was the State Normal and Industrial School for Women. His service began in 1908 and ended in 1919 when he left JMU to become the eighth President of Virginia Polytechnic Institute and State University. His tenure at Virginia Tech lasted from September 1, 1919 to July 1, 1945. Burruss was responsible for the full admittance of women as students. He also fully implemented the neogothic style of architecture at Virginia Tech. Shortly before he assumed the presidency the Old McBryde Hall had been the first building on the Virginia Tech campus to be constructed in the neogothic style using locally quarried native limestone. It had originally been planned as a red brick building but native limestone was substituted when brick became unavailable due a shortage caused by military construction during World War I. Burruss adopted the Collegiate Gothic style using the native limestone now known as Hokie Stone for the many subsequent buildings constructed during his tenure giving the Virginia Tech campus the appearance seen today.

== Honors ==
Burruss Hall, the administration building at Virginia Tech, is named for Burruss. JMU also has a building named in Burruss' honor.

Preceded by None	James Madison University President; 1908–1919	Succeeded by Samuel Page Duke
Preceded by Joseph Dupuy Eggleston; 1913 – 1919	Virginia Tech President; 1919 – 1945	Succeeded by John Redd Hutcheson; 1945 – 1947
