= Virginia Tech =

Public university in Blacksburg, Virginia, US

Virginia Polytechnic Institute and State University
- Former names: Virginia Agricultural and Mechanical College (1872–1896); Virginia Agricultural and Mechanical College and Polytechnic Institute (1896–1944); Virginia Polytechnic Institute (1944–1970)
- Motto: Ut Prosim (Latin)
- Motto in English: "That I May Serve"
- Type: Public land-grant research senior military university
- Established: June 20, 1872; 154 years ago
- Accreditation: SACS
- Academic affiliations: ORAU; SCHEV; URA; CUWMA; Sea-grant; Space-grant
- Endowment: $2.09 billion (2025)
- President: Timothy Sands
- Provost: Julie Ross
- Faculty: 2,976 full-time, 261 part-time (fall 2023)
- Students: 38,294 (fall 2023)
- Undergraduates: 30,504 (fall 2023)
- Postgraduates: 7,790 (fall 2023)
- Location: Blacksburg, Virginia, United States; 37°13.5′N 80°25.5′W
- Campus: 2,600 acres (11 km^{2}; 4.1 sq mi); Small city
- Other campuses: Abingdon; Hampton Roads; Northern Virginia; Richmond; Roanoke; Riva San Vitale; Punta Cana
- Newspaper: Collegiate Times
- Colors: Chicago maroon and burnt orange
- Nickname: Hokies
- Sporting affiliations: NCAA Division I FBS – ACC
- Mascot: HokieBird
- Website: vt.edu

Virginia Polytechnic Institute and State University, commonly referred to as Virginia Tech (VT), is a public land-grant research university with its main campus in Blacksburg, Virginia, United States. It was founded as the Virginia Agricultural and Mechanical College in 1872.

The university also has educational facilities in six regions statewide, a research center in Punta Cana, Dominican Republic, and a study-abroad site in Riva San Vitale, Switzerland. Through its Corps of Cadets ROTC program, Virginia Tech is a senior military college.

Virginia Tech offers 280 undergraduate and graduate degree programs to its over 38,000 students; as of 2016, it was the state's second-largest public university by enrollment. It is classified among "R1: Doctoral Universities – Very high research spending and doctorate production".

The university's athletic teams are the Virginia Tech Hokies and compete in Division I of the NCAA as members of the Atlantic Coast Conference.

== History ==
In 1872, with federal funds provided by the Morrill Act of 1862, the Reconstruction-era Virginia General Assembly purchased the facilities of Preston and Olin Institute, a small Methodist school for boys in Southwest Virginia's rural Montgomery County. That same year, 250 acres (100 ha) of the adjoining Solitude Farm including the house and several farm buildings on the estate were acquired for $21,250 from Robert Taylor Preston, a son of Governor of Virginia, James Patton Preston. The commonwealth incorporated a new institution on the site, a state-supported land-grant military institute named Virginia Agricultural and Mechanical College.

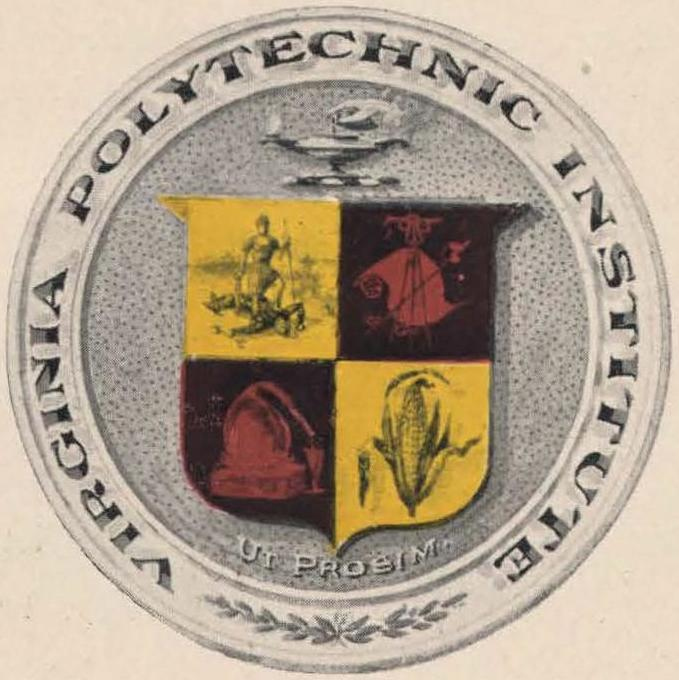
Virginia Polytechnic Institute logo in the 1899 yearbook

Virginia Tech's first student, Addison "Add" Caldwell registered on October 1, 1872, after hiking over 25 miles from his home in Craig County, Virginia. A statue, located in the Upper Quad of campus commemorates Add's journey to enroll. First-year cadets and their training cadre re-enact Addison Caldwell's journey every year in the Caldwell March. They complete the first half of the 26-mile march in the fall and the second half in the spring.

The first five presidents of Virginia Agricultural and Mechanical College served in the Confederate States Army or the Confederate government during the Civil War as did many of its early professors including the first Commandant, James H. Lane, a VMI graduate and former Confederate General who taught civil engineering and commerce at the college and is the namesake of Lane Hall, one of the oldest buildings on campus, built in 1888. Its third president, Thomas Nelson Conrad, was a notorious Confederate spy who ran a covert intelligence gathering operation from a home in the heart of Washington, D.C. Its sixth president, Paul Brandon Barringer, was a son of Confederate General Rufus Barringer and a nephew of Confederate Generals Stonewall Jackson and Daniel Harvey Hill.

In a nod to this southern heritage the Confederate Battle Flag was traditionally waved by cheerleaders at Virginia Tech football games and the Highty-Tighties played Dixie as a fight song when the Hokies scored a touchdown. A large Confederate flag also hung inside Cassell Coliseum where Virginia Tech basketball games are played. Since 1963, "Skipper", a replica of a Civil War cannon has been fired at football games by members of the Corps of Cadets when the team scores. The Confederate Flag was also prominently featured on all Virginia Tech class rings. The display of the Confederate flag at athletic events ended in the late 1960s after Marguerite Harper, a black woman attending Virginia Tech on a Rockefeller Scholarship for culturally disadvantaged students, was elected to the student senate during her sophomore year and made a successful resolution to end the practice. Following the resolution there was a large demonstration in opposition to the removal of the Confederate flag. The campus was covered in Confederate flags and "Dixie" was blasting from dormitory windows. Harper and her white roommate received hate mail and threatening phone calls, but the resolution stood, and the display of the rebel flag ended in 1969. The Confederate flag on Virginia Tech class rings became optional in 1972 and could be omitted at the student's request; it has since been removed from class ring designs entirely.

Under the leadership of seventh president Joseph Dupuy Eggleston, who held the position from 1913 to 1919, the university established a Reserve Officer Training Corps to support national efforts during World War I.

Early on the morning of March 13, 1917, physics professor Charles E. Vawter, Jr. (son of Charles E. Vawter, who had served on the VPI board of visitors from 1886 to 1900), shot Stockton Heth, Jr., a scion of one of Montgomery County's wealthiest families, in his campus home on faculty row. Heth, who lived at Whitethorne, an antebellum mansion on a 1,500-acre estate near Blacksburg, later died of his wounds in a Roanoke hospital. Due to the Heth family's wealth and political connections, Vawter's position as head of the VPI physics department, and the scandalous extramarital affair that led to the shooting, the resulting murder trial was one of the most sensational in Virginia history. Vawter was later acquitted and left the school. Eggleston attempted to suppress news of the affair in the media with considerable success.

=== College reorganizations ===
During Thomas Nelson Conrad's tenure as president, the college switched from semesters to the quarter system, which remained in place until the late 1980s. Under the 1891–1907 presidency of John McLaren McBryde, the school organized its academic programs into a traditional four-year college and a graduate department was founded. The evolution of the school's programs led to a name change in 1896 to Virginia Agricultural and Mechanical College and Polytechnic Institute. However, the "Agricultural and Mechanical College" portion of the name was popularly omitted almost immediately. In practice, the school's name was Virginia Polytechnic Institute (VPI) long before the name was officially shortened in 1944.

VPI admitted its first female students in 1921 as civilian day students; they did not live on campus. In 1923, VPI changed a policy of compulsory participation in the Corps of Cadets from four years to two years. In 1931, VPI began teaching classes at the Norfolk Division of the College of William and Mary (now Old Dominion University). This program eventually developed into a two-year engineering program that allowed students to transfer to VPI for their final two years of degree work.

The first women's dormitory at VPI, Hillcrest Hall, was built in 1940. In 1943, VPI merged with Radford State Teachers College in nearby Radford, which became VPI's women's division; the merger was dissolved in 1964. Today, Radford University is a co-educational research university that enrolls nearly 10,000 students and offers more than 150 undergraduate and graduate programs.

=== Post–World War II ===
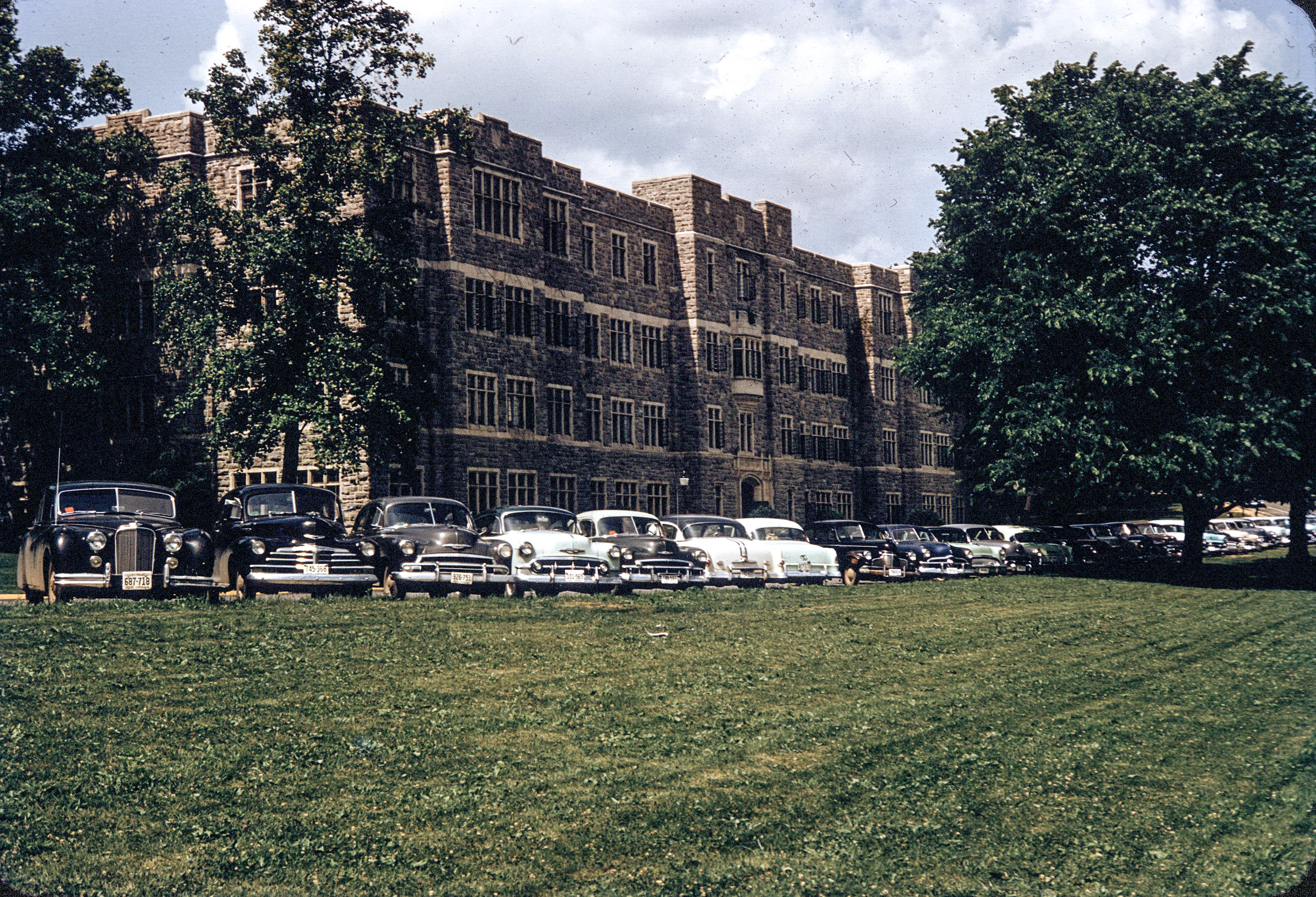
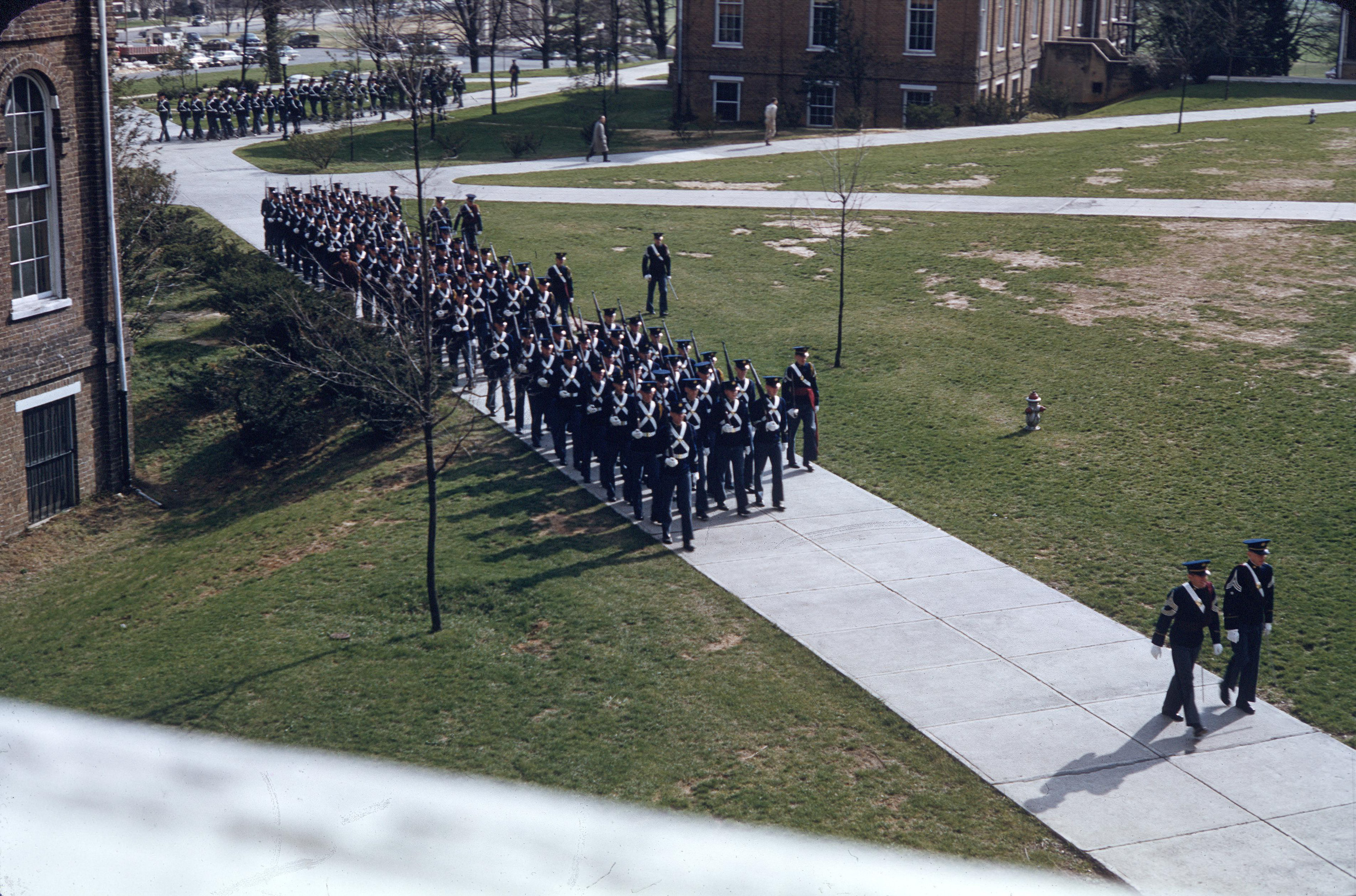
Left: A Jaguar Mark VII (left) and several Chevrolet Deluxe cars parked in front of Patton Hall, c. 1952; right: Corps of Cadets on campus, both images taken c. 1952

In 1953, under the leadership of President Walter Stephenson Newman, VPI became the first historically white, four-year public institution among the 11 states in the former Confederacy to admit a black undergraduate. Three more black students were admitted in 1954. At the time Virginia still enforced Jim Crow laws and largely practiced racial segregation in public and private education, churches, neighborhoods, restaurants, and movie theaters and these first black students at VPI were not allowed to live in residence halls or eat in the dining halls on campus. Instead, they boarded with African American families in Blacksburg. In 1958, Charlie L. Yates made history as the first African American to graduate from VPI. Yates earned a bachelor's degree in mechanical engineering, with honors, and was hailed as the first African American "to be graduated from any major Southern engineering institute," according to news reports at the time.

VPI President T. Marshall Hahn, whose tenure ran from 1962 to 1974, was responsible for many of the programs and policies that transformed VPI from a small, historically white, predominately male, military institute with a primary focus on undergraduate teaching into a major co-educational research university. The student body that had been approximately 5,682 in 1962 increased by roughly 1,000 students each year, new dormitories and academic buildings were constructed, faculty members were added – in 1966, for instance, more than 100 new professors joined the faculty – and research budgets were increased. During Hahn's tenure, not only did the university graduate its first Rhodes Scholar, W.W. Lewis, Class of 1963, the requirement for male students to participate in the Corps of Cadets for two years was dropped in 1964. Beginning in the fall of 1973, women could participate in the Corps, making Virginia Tech among the nation's first senior military colleges to integrate women.

In 1970, the state legislature granted VPI university status under its present legal name, Virginia Polytechnic Institute and State University. In the early 1990s, university administration authorized the official use of "Virginia Tech" as equivalent to the full legal name. In so doing, it officially adopted a nickname dating to the 1910s and which had been accepted as first reference for the school's athletic teams since the 1970s. However, diplomas and transcripts still spell out the formal name. Similarly, the abbreviation "VT" is far more common today than either VPI or VPI&SU.

Since the 1990s, the school has preferred the use of "Virginia Tech" in all but the most formal circumstances.

=== Vietnam War era ===
During the Vietnam War, students on college campuses across the nation protested the draft and U.S. involvement in the conflict. Despite its long history as a military school, Virginia Tech was no exception. Most protests at Virginia Tech were small sit-ins and teach-ins, but In mid-April 1970 a group of anti-war protesters including students and faculty members disrupted a Corps of Cadets drill on campus. The Virginia Tech administration under Hahn took swift action. The students involved were suspended and the faculty members involved were fired from the university and the administration went to court and obtained an injunction to prevent them from repeating the act. This succeeded in calming tensions on campus, but only for a few weeks.

Tensions on campus reached the boiling point several days following the Kent State Shootings when on May 12, 1970, a large mob including students and a number of non-student anti-war protesters enraged by the Kent State incident and angered by the administration's disciplinary actions in response to a number of recent infractions by protesters including; vandalism of university property, a series of potentially dangerous fires set on campus, breaking and entering into a university building, and a sit-in in Cowgill Hill, seized Williams Hall and barricaded themselves inside. The administration responded quickly calling in law enforcement and early the following morning Virginia State Police forced their way into Williams Hall and began rounding up the protesters. Once inside the building, the police discovered materials that could have potentially been used for a firebomb. The first few protesters were dragged out of the building; the rest left peacefully and were arrested and taken to the Montgomery County jail. The students involved in the seizure were suspended from Virginia Tech and given twenty-four hours to remove their belongings from campus after being released from jail.

Several more anti-war protests occurred at Virginia Tech during the early 1970s, but none turned violent.

=== Late 20th century ===
The university continued to expand through the last quarter of the 20th century. In 1975 William E. Lavery, who had joined the Virginia Tech faculty in 1966, took over as president when Hahn left the university to join Georgia-Pacific.

Desperate for additional farmland for the support of teaching, research, and extension programs in the College of Agriculture and Life Sciences, Virginia Tech acquired Kentland Farm on December 31, 1986. Virginia Tech secretly traded about 250 acres of research orchards adjacent to a commercial area that would soon become Christiansburg's main shopping district to a group of developers for the historic but long fallow 1,785-acre Kentland property. The developers on the other end of the swap, one of whom was a former Tech athletics official, quickly sold 40 acres of the former university farmland for $2.7 million. News of the land swap, and especially the fact that it was done behind closed doors, with no input from College of Agriculture faculty sparked outrage.

Also in 1986, Virginia Tech became embroiled in an athletic scandal sparked by allegations of illegal recruiting, the bitter departure of two athletic directors in less than a year and millions of dollars of debt run up by the university's sports program due to mismanagement of financial resources, million dollar coaching contracts, and lavish expense accounts for athletics officials that led to a rebuke from Governor of Virginia, Gerald Baliles in 1987. Baliles, the featured speaker at the Virginia Tech's 115th annual commencement exercises, scolded the Virginia Tech Board of Visitors for the scandal and warned other state-supported institutions in Virginia not to put athletics ahead of academics.

Lavery developed a reorganization plan for the troubled Athletic Department, and Frank Beamer was hired to replace Bill Dooley as head football coach, but with negative publicity continuing to swirl within and around the university, he announced his resignation on October 16, 1987, effective December 31, 1987, to prevent polarization of the campus. He was succeeded as president by James Douglas McComas who served until 1994.

Due to the unpopularity of US involvement in the Vietnam War enrollment in the Virginia Tech Corps of Cadets spiraled downward through the 1960s, 1970s and 1980s. In 1991 through the efforts of Henry Dekker (Class of 1944) The Corps of Cadets Alumni Inc. was created to save the corps, whose numbers had declined to only a few hundred students. In 1992 the alumni organization-initiated Corps Review, a newsletter that was expanded to a magazine in 2004 and targeted corps alumni. In the mid-1990s, the corps alumni organization set a goal of "1000 in 2000" and initiated a major campaign to push the number of cadets to 1,000 by the turn of the century. The goal was not reached, but membership in the corps did increase substantially by the end of the decade.

=== 21st century ===
The early decades of this century have seen expansion across the university's institutions in both physical and population sizes. In 2001, Virginia Tech acquired 326 acres of the Heth Farm adjacent to campus, increasing the College Farm to over 3,000 acres. The Virginia Tech Carilion School of Medicine and Research Institute was created with a strategic partnership with the Carilion Clinic and the governor of Virginia. These years also brought about the rapid development of the university's professional schools of graduate education and business programs. Virginia Tech brought in over $500 million in research expenditures in 2014.

The establishment of scholarships for cadets and a resurgence of national patriotism after the September 11 attacks helped the corps recruit new cadets, increasing the ranks to 1,127 by 2018—the largest corps the university has seen since the mid-1960s. The Virginia Tech Corps of Cadets is poised to increase enrollment to 1,400 in coming years.

==== 2007 mass shooting ====
On April 16, 2007, Virginia Tech student Seung-Hui Cho fatally shot 32 faculty members and students and wounded 17 others in two locations on campus before killing himself. The massacre is the deadliest mass shooting on an American college campus, surpassing the University of Texas tower shooting in 1966. Although it was at the time the deadliest mass shooting committed by a lone gunman in U.S. history, it has since been surpassed by two shootings at an Orlando nightclub and an outdoor music festival on the Las Vegas Strip. It is the second-deadliest school massacre in U.S. history, surpassed only by the Bath School bombing in 1927 that killed 44.

==== Further growth ====
Due to rapid growth of incoming freshmen classes, the university announced in 2019 that it would offer 1,559 incoming, in-state freshmen financial incentives to skip the 2019–20 school year in Blacksburg. Expecting a larger-than-planned class size, the university budgeted $3.3 million for the endeavor. Virginia Tech also waived the requirement that freshmen live on campus for the 2019–20 school year, leased an off-campus Holiday Inn, and converted its on-campus hotel to house students.

== Organization and administration ==
Virginia Tech is a public university and one of Virginia's two land-grant institutions. Its academic programs are administered by nine colleges, the Graduate School, and the Honors College.

College/school founding
College/school	Year founded
Graduate School	1891
College of Engineering	1903
College of Agriculture and Life Sciences	1903
College of Architecture, Art, and Design	1964
College of Liberal Arts and Human Sciences	1964
College of Science	1964
Pamplin College of Business	1965
College of Veterinary Medicine	1978
College of Natural Resources and Environment	1992
Carilion School of Medicine and Research Institute	2007
Honors College	2016

=== Board of Visitors ===
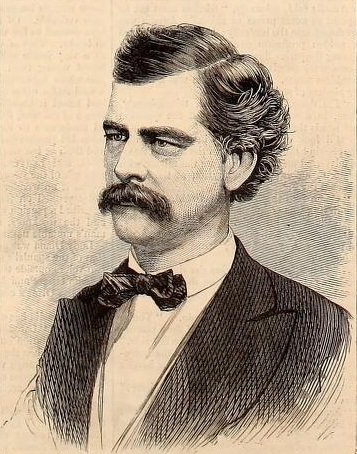
Virginia Governor Gilbert C. Walker

The board of visitors is the university’s primary governing organization responsible for the maintenance of the university, its property, and its students. The first board was established in 1872 by Virginia Governor Gilbert C. Walker. Since Virginia Tech is a public university, 13 of the board's 14 members are appointed by the Governor of Virginia. The fourteenth member, the president of the Virginia Department of Agriculture and Consumer Services, serves ex officio. A minimum of 6 board members are required to be alumni of Virginia Tech and a minimum of 10 board members must be Virginia state residents.

== Academics ==
Virginia Tech offers 116 bachelor's degree programs through its nine undergraduate academic colleges, 160 master's and doctoral degree programs through the Graduate School, and a professional degree from the Virginia–Maryland College of Veterinary Medicine. In addition, the Virginia Tech Carilion School of Medicine and Research Institute is a public-private partnership jointly managed by Virginia Tech and the Carilion Clinic founded on January 3, 2007.

=== Admissions ===
Class of 2022 freshmen
Number of freshman applicants	32,103
Admit rate	73%
Participated in Early Decision Plan	18%
Average GPA of admitted students	4.15
Average SAT scores of admitted students	1310
Middle 50% ACT scores of admitted students	24 to 28

Virginia Tech received a record number of nearly 22,500 applications for the fall 2015 freshman class, an increase of 7.6% from the previous year's 20,897 applications for an overall admissions rate of 65.8%. The typical student offered admission had a high-school grade point average of 4.00, with the middle 50 percent ranging from 3.84 and 4.27. The average cumulative SAT score was 1250 (out of 1600), with a middle range ranging from 1160 to 1340. Of the 5,518 students who accepted the offers of admission (for an admissions yield of 38%), 18 percent accepted under the Early Decision Plan. The Office of Undergraduate Admissions is located within the Visitor and Undergraduate Admissions Center.

Virginia Tech offers a highly selective Honors College, which provides undergraduate students 11 different ways to earn Honors credits towards one of the five Honors degree options. Once admitted, Honors students are required to maintain a 3.6 GPA in order to remain in the program. Roughly one-fourth of the approximately 1,600 University Honors students live in one of the two University Honors residential halls, the Honors Residential College located in East Ambler-Johnston and the Hillcrest Honors Community.

For the 2013–14 academic year, the Graduate School at Virginia Tech enrolled 6,723 graduate students (4,465 full-time; 2,258 part-time) in its masters and doctoral programs.

The Pamplin College of Business received 381 applications for its incoming Evening MBA program and offered admission to 142. The class's average GMAT was 610, and mean undergraduate GPA was 3.4.

The Virginia Tech Carilion School of Medicine in Roanoke, Va., received 4,403 applications for its eighth incoming class, the class of 2021, and offered admission to 42. The class's MCAT scores range was 503–520 (median 512, mean 512), and mean undergraduate GPA was 3.57.

In 2023, Virginia Tech became the second public university to end its use of legacy admissions, after the U.S. Supreme Court decided Students for Fair Admissions v. Harvard, banning affirmative action in college admissions. The university also ended its binding early decision program because it "created unneeded pressure on students [...] particularly those needing financial aid".

== Rankings ==
Academic rankings

National
- Forbes: 82
- U.S. News & World Report: 51
- Washington Monthly: 28
- WSJ/College Pulse: 19

Global
- ARWU: 201–300
- QS: 358 (tie)
- THE: 251–300
- U.S. News & World Report: 281 (tie)

USNWR professional/grad rankings
Biological Sciences	119
Chemistry	67
Clinical Psychology	71
Computer Science	35
Earth Sciences	33
Economics	68
Education	90
Engineering	31
English	80
Mathematics	51
Physics	50
Psychology	71
Public Affairs	56
Public Health	99
Sociology	76
Statistics	37
Veterinary Medicine	18

USNWR Engineering grad rankings
Biological/Agricultural	9
Civil	9
Environmental/ Environmental Health	4
Industrial/Manufacturing/Systems	7

USNWR global ranking
Agricultural Sciences	136
Arts & Humanities	247
Biology & Biochemistry	256
Chemistry	269
Civil Engineering	79
Clinical Medicine	593
Computer Science	58
Economics & Business	198
Electrical & Electronic Engineering	48
Engineering	69
Environment/Ecology	161
Geosciences	158
Materials Science	263
Mathematics	241
Mechanical Engineering	70
Microbiology	130
Molecular Biology & Genetics	378
Physics	389
Plant & Animal Science	87
Social Sciences & Public Health	156
Space Science	225

In U.S. News & World Report's list of "2024 Best Colleges", Virginia Tech tied for 47th overall among national universities, tied for 20th among public ones, tied at 25th for "Most Innovative", ranked 156th in "Best Value Schools", and tied for 207th in "Top Performers on Social Mobility".

The Pamplin College of Business's part-time MBA program was tied for 19th overall by U.S. News & World Report in 2020. The Master of Information Technology program, jointly sponsored by the Pamplin College of Business and the College of Engineering, is ranked No. 4 in U.S. News & World Report's Best Online Graduate Computer Information Technology Programs. This interdisciplinary program is offered entirely online.

Programs in the College of Architecture and Urban Studies (CAUS) include architecture + design, landscape architecture, urban planning, and public administration. In its 2016 "America's Best Architecture & Design Schools" report, DesignIntelligence ranked the undergraduate architecture program 3rd nationally among both public and private universities. The graduate architecture program ranked 9th in the nation. For 2013, DesignIntelligence ranked the university's undergraduate and graduate landscape architecture programs No. 2 in the nation. In addition, DesignIntelligence ranked the university's undergraduate interior design program 6th and undergraduate industrial design program 3rd. The Planetizen 2012 Guide to Graduate Urban Planning Programs ranked Virginia Tech's MURP program as 19th. Virginia Tech's MURP program was also rated among the best programs in Technology, Land Use Planning, Environmental Planning, and Growth Management.

Kiplinger's Personal Finance places Virginia Tech 20th in its 2019 ranking of 174 best value public colleges in the United States.

=== Student affairs rankings ===
Virginia Tech received the following rankings from The Princeton Review in its 2025 Best Colleges Rankings:

Category	Ranking
Best Alumni Network (Public Schools)	2
Their Students Love These Colleges	5
Best Career Placement (Public)	8
Best Student Support and Counseling Services	8
Best Campus Food	10
Best Schools for Making an Impact (Public)	10
Most Engaged in Community Service	14
Best Schools for Internships (Public)	17
Town-Gown Relations are Great	17
Best Value Colleges without Aid (Public)	19
Lots of Greek Life	20
Best Value Colleges (Public)	39

== Research ==
Virginia Tech's research and development expenditures (R&D) were $542 million in fiscal year 2019, which ranked 48th among education institutions in the nation and 2nd in the state of Virginia according to the National Science Foundation. As a result, Virginia Tech marked its 15th consecutive year of research growth, with the university's research portfolio more than doubling from $192.7 million in fiscal year 2000. The only Virginia institution in the top 50 of the NSF's rankings for research expenditures, Virginia Tech is No. 23 among public universities. The university's research expenditures rank it in the top 5 percent of more than 900 research universities and colleges. Each year, the university receives thousands of awards to conduct research from an ever-expanding base of sponsors. Researchers pursue new discoveries in agriculture, biotechnology, information and communication technology, human health, transportation, energy management (including leadership in fuel-cell technology and power electronics), security, sustainability, and a wide range of other engineering, scientific, social science, and creative fields. This research led to 36 patents and 17 license and option agreements in fiscal year 2013.

Research expenditures, fiscal years 2009–2017
2009	$399 million
2011	$450 million
2013	$496 million
2015	$504 million
2017	$522 million

=== Fralin Life Science Institute ===
The Fralin Life Science Institute is an expansion of the Fralin Biotechnology Center, which was established in 1991, and is one of four investment institutes at the university. The expansion was established in 2008. Research at the institute is focused on the areas of vector-borne disease; infectious disease and microbial sciences; plant sciences; obesity; cancer biology; and ecology and organismal biology.

Their research strategic priority areas are research ecosystem, people, research opportunities, and research background. The institute’s main office and laboratory is currently situated in Steger Hall, in Virginia Tech’s Blacksburg campus. Fralin oversees five buildings on Virginia Tech’s Blacksburg Campus in total. Supporting research centers affiliated with the Institute include the Translational Plant Science Center, the Global Change Center, and the Center for Emerging, Zoonotic, and Arthropod-Borne Pathogens.

The institute provides multiple opportunities for undergraduate research, including the First-Year Fralin Undergraduate program, Fralin Undergraduate Research Fellowship, and Fralin Summer Undergraduate Research Fellowship.

=== Virginia Tech Transportation Institute ===
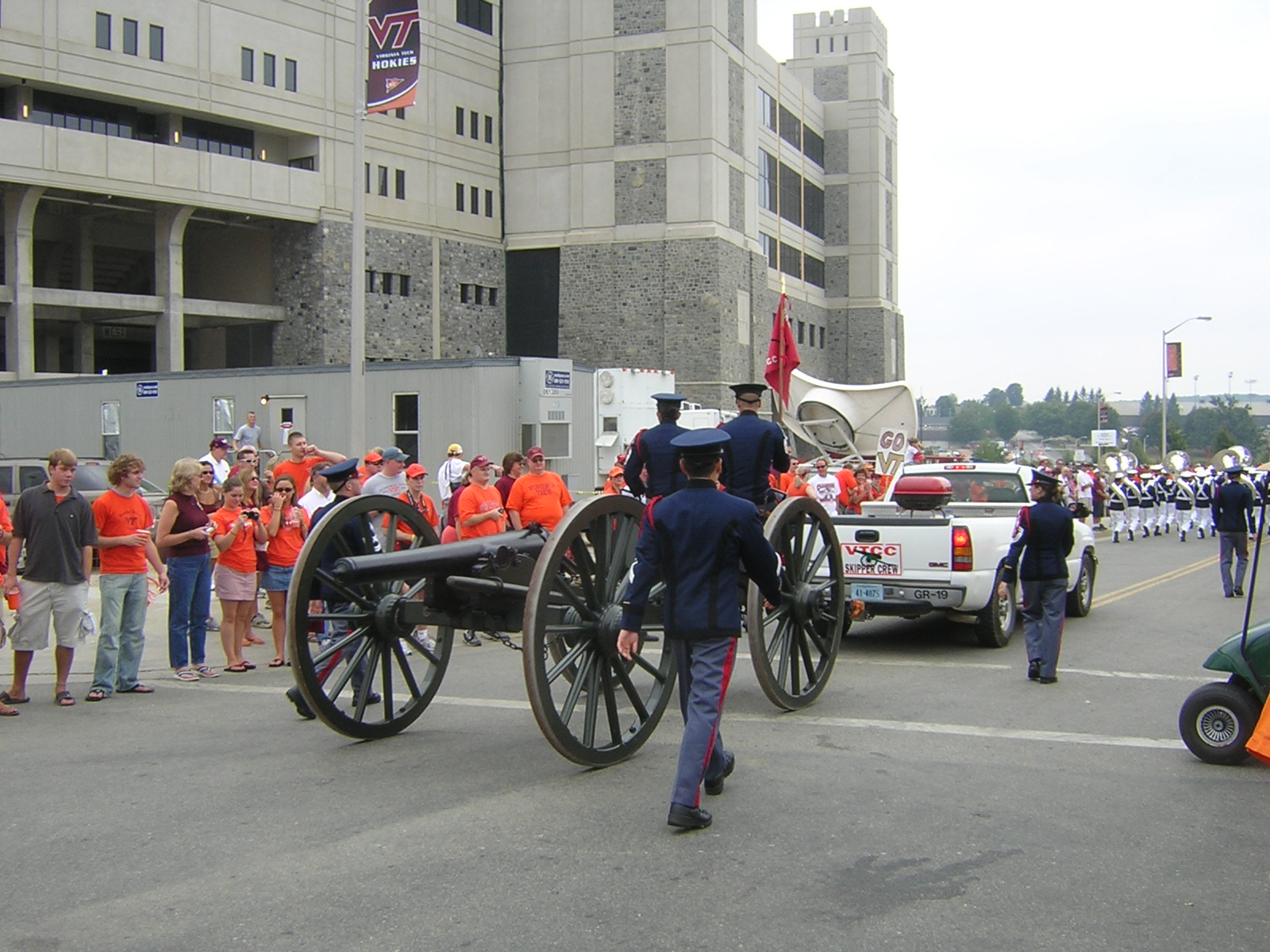
Virginia Tech Skipper Crew

The Virginia Tech Transportation Institute (VTTI) was founded as the Center for Transportation Research in 1988 and employs more than 350 personnel. VTTI has more than $125 million in active research awards, and has a mission to save lives, save time, save money, and protect the environment. It is the second largest university-level transportation institute in the United States, and the largest group of driving safety researchers in the world. Facilities include the 2.2-mile (3.5 km), two-lane, fully instrumented Virginia Smart Road; connected-vehicle test beds in Southwest and Northern Virginia; more than 83,000 square feet of office and laboratory space; the VTTI/Center for Injury Biomechanics Crash Sled Lab; and the National Tire Research Center in Southern Virginia. These laboratories include an asphalt lab, fully equipped garages, instrumentation bays, and a machine shop for working on VTTI's vehicle fleet.

VTTI develops and tests advanced transportation safety devices, techniques, and innovative applications. VTTI's research impacts public policy in transportation, notably through research into distracted driving and commercial hour-of-service.

VTTI conducts applied research to address transportation challenges from various perspectives: vehicle, driver, infrastructure, materials, and environment. Most notable among VTTI endeavors are its naturalistic driving studies. These studies particularly utilize VTTI's data acquisition systems, which gather continuous video and driving performance data in real-world driving conditions. These systems have been installed in nearly 4,000 passenger vehicles, commercial trucks and motor coaches, and motorcycles.

=== Institute for Critical Technology and Applied Science ===
Since 2005, the Institute for Critical Technology and Applied Science (ICTAS) has made efforts to build capacity at the intersection of engineering, science, biology, and the humanities. Thrust areas include nuclear engineering, nanoscale science and engineering, nano-bio interface, sustainable energy, safe and sustainable water, national security, cognition and communication systems, renewable materials, and emerging technologies.

=== Other areas of research ===
Other research conducted throughout the university's colleges and interdisciplinary groups includes high-performance computing; advanced materials; wireless telecommunication; housing; human and animal health; cognition, development, and behavior; the environment; and energy, including power electronics, biofuels, fuel cells, and solar-powered building structures.

- The School of Biomedical Engineering & Sciences partners with the College of Engineering, Wake Forest University School of Medicine, and the College of Veterinary Medicine. Virginia Tech's research includes biomechanics, cellular transport, computational modeling, biomaterials, bioheat and mass transfer, biofluid mechanics, instrumentation, ergonomics, and tissue engineering.
- Virginia Tech Intellectual Properties Inc. (VTIP) was established in 1985 as a nonprofit corporation to support the mission of the university by protecting and licensing intellectual properties that result from research performed by Virginia Tech faculty, staff members, and students. During fiscal year 2012, 17 U.S. patents and six foreign patents were issued to VTIP, and 32 license and option agreements were signed. In addition, VTIP reported $2,269,991 in license revenue.
- The Virginia Tech Applied Research Corporation (VT-ARC) is a private nonprofit corporation affiliated with Virginia Tech that was established in fall 2010. With offices in Northern Virginia and Blacksburg, VT-ARC fosters applied research and development, and management of large contract research projects. VT-ARC researches in intelligence, cyber security and information technology, national security, energy, and health care.
- The Virginia Cooperative Extension programs are delivered through a network of faculty, 107 county and city offices, 11 agricultural research and Extension centers, and six 4-H educational centers. The system incorporates the faculty at the College of Agriculture and Life Sciences and through research and Extension efforts, the college helped elevate the state's agricultural exports to record numbers. In 2013, exports in the Commonwealth of Virginia reached $2.85 billion.
- The Virginia Tech Corporate Research Center (VTCRC) is home to over 170 research, technology and support companies. The 230-acre (93 ha) park is located in a mountain setting. An expansion on the northwest side of the park provides enough land to construct 15 buildings in addition to the 33 single- and multi-tenant buildings currently on-site. The VTCRC employs over 2,900 employees.
- The Virginia Tech Institute for Policy and Governance is a nonprofit and public sector research and outreach institute for the university.
- The Center for Modeling Immunity to Enteric Pathogens is a National Institute of Allergy and Infectious Diseases (NIAID)-funded program to model immune responses to gut pathogens.
- The Virginia Tech Language and Culture Institute (LCI) provides language-related programs and services for academic and professional development. The institute was started in the 1960s, when members of the Blacksburg chapter of the American Association of University Women decided to volunteer their time teaching English. The women held free classes in church basements or their own homes to help the spouses of international students and faculty members learn English. In 2014 LCI opened a new state-of-the-art learning center in Fairfax, Virginia that provides language-related programs and services for academic and professional development both on the main campus in Blacksburg and within the National Capital Region.
- The Fralin Biomedical Research Institute at VTC is in Roanoke, Virginia and is an integral component of the new medical research and education initiative embodied by the Virginia Tech Carilion School of Medicine and Fralin Biomedical Research Institute.
- The Hume Center for National Security and Technology conducts research in the areas of cybersecurity, artificial intelligence, and national security.

== Campus ==
The Virginia Tech campus is in Blacksburg, Virginia. Most buildings are built of limestone in a neo-Gothic style. Notable green spaces include the Hahn Horticulture Garden, Virginia Tech Duck Pond, and the old-growth forest, Stadium Woods.

The central campus is roughly bordered by Prices Fork Road to the northwest, Plantation Drive to the west, Main Street to the east, and US 460 Bypass to the south, though it has several thousand acres beyond the central campus.

In the center of the Blacksburg campus lies the Drillfield, a large oval field running northeast to southwest, encircled by a one-way street that is known as Drillfield Drive. The Drillfield's name, coined in 1926 after the completion of Virginia Tech's first real stadium, Miles Stadium, stems from its use by the Virginia Tech Corps of Cadets to conduct military drills. A waterway, Stroubles Creek, runs beneath the Drillfield on the south side. A three-sided conduit for the creek that retains the natural bed of the creek was installed in 1934, and, in 1971, the first two asphalt walks were added.

On the northwestern side of the Drillfield stand most of the university's academic and administrative buildings, including Burruss and McBryde Halls. On the southeastern side of the Drillfield stand most of the residential buildings, including students' residence halls, dining halls, and War Memorial Gym. Newman Library is on the eastern side of campus and connects to Torgersen Bridge, which spans the main road into campus, Alumni Mall. North of the Drillfield and northwest of Alumni Mall lies the Upper Quad, known to many students as military campus. The Upper Quad is home to the Corps of Cadets' barracks.

On the main campus in Blacksburg, most of the buildings incorporate Hokie Stone as a building material. In 2010, the board of visitors passed a resolution about using the gray stone, shaded by hues of brown and pink, in all building projects.

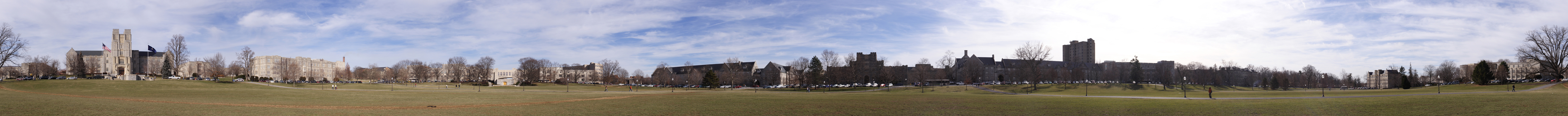
Panoramic view of Virginia Tech's Drillfield

=== Extended campuses ===
The university has established five branch campuses:

- Virginia Tech Hampton Roads Centers, Newport News and Virginia Beach
- Northern Virginia Center, Falls Church (National Capital Region)
- Virginia Tech Richmond Center, Richmond
- Virginia Tech Roanoke Center, Roanoke
- Virginia Tech Southwest Center, Abingdon

==== Greater Washington D.C., area ====
Virginia Tech's presence in the Washington Metropolitan Area links regional graduate education and outreach programs that are consistent with the university's strategic research areas of excellence: energy materials and environment, social and individual transformation, health, food, and nutrition, and innovative technologies and complex systems.

Supporting the university's missions is the Virginia Tech National Capital Region. The university has established collaborations and partnerships with local and federal agencies, nonprofit research organizations, businesses, and other institutions of higher education. Current locations include Alexandria, Arlington, Fairfax, Falls Church, Leesburg, Manassas, and Middleburg.

Biomedical Technology Development and Management is an executive program in the National Capital Region. The Master of Science in Biomedical Technology Development and Management (BTDM) is a graduate level degree created by Virginia Tech in response to future directions in medical product discovery and development and the emerging needs of industry and regulatory agencies. Curriculum for the degree program integrates science with technology, management, ethics, and public policy, and draws on the strengths of Virginia Tech in science, industrial and systems engineering, business and management, and medical research programs.

In 2014, the university opened a Language and Culture Institute location in Fairfax. The institute offers intensive English language programs for college-age students, professionals, and diplomats.

===== Innovation campus =====
The Virginia Tech Innovation Campus is a development initiated by the university in 2018 located in Alexandria, Virginia’s Potomac Yard. The campus is part of the Virginia Tech Greater Washington, D.C. Metro Area campuses, previously known as the Northern Virginia Center or National Capital Region. The campus offers graduate-level degrees, including a Master’s in Engineering, Computer Science and Applications and a Master’s in Engineering, Computer Science. A fast-track partnership program that allows students to earn credits preemptively at approved universities is also available. These degree offerings highlight the major research focus areas of the campus, which include technological advancement related to artificial intelligence, wireless network systems, machine learning, software development, and quantum research and development. Plans for the campus’ program additions include the addition of higher level graduate degrees, such as doctoral programs.

The first major campus building, Innovation Campus Building One, was designed by SmithGroup and finished construction in February 2025. It became open to the public as part of the campus grand opening ceremony. Innovation Campus Building One is 300,000 square feet in area and 11 stories tall. The cost of the campus development is estimated at 1 billion dollars.

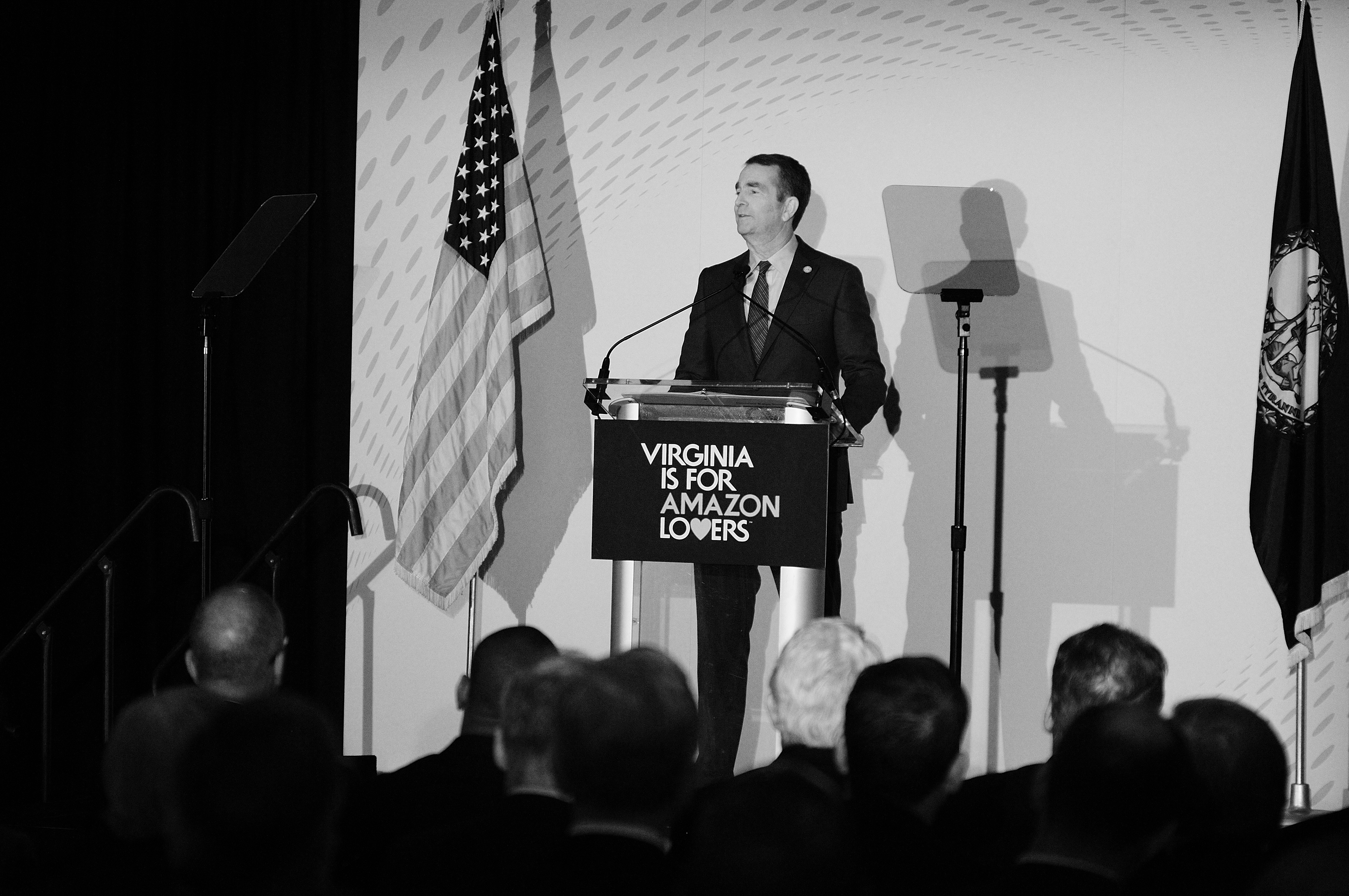
Amazon HQ2 Announcement, November 2018

Key financial partners and supporters for the campus construction and overall development include The Commonwealth of Virginia, The City of Alexandria, Northrop Grumman, and Boeing. Advisory board members hail from Hunch Analytics, Boeing, KPMG, Greater Washington Partnership, and Octo. The Commonwealth of Virginia donated approximately 2 billion dollars to support university research and development by both Virginia Tech and George Mason University, subsequently impacting Amazon’s decision to build Amazon HQ2 headquarters in Arlington, Virginia just 2 miles from the Innovation Campus. Northrop Grumman’s donation totals 12.5 million dollars, and Boeing’s donation totals 50 million dollars.

=== International campuses ===
==== Caribbean Center for Education and Research (CCER) ====
Located on the eastern tip of the Dominican Republic, the Caribbean Center for Education and Research (CCER) in Punta Cana provides a base for Virginia Tech faculty to conduct research as well as instruct students on biodiversity, environmental and social sustainability, global issues in natural resources, and hotel and tourism management. The center is the product of a partnership between Virginia Tech and the PUNTACANA Ecological Foundation (PCEF) and the PUNTACANA Resort and Club. PCEF maintains a 2,000-acre (810 ha) natural forest reserve, 14 kilometres (8.7 mi) of protected coral reef, freshwater lagoons and coastal mangroves.

==== Steger Center for International Scholarship ====
Formerly known as the Center for European Studies and Architecture (CESA), the Steger Center is the university's European campus center and base for operations and support of its programs in the region. The center's location in Riva San Vitale, Ticino, the Italian-speaking canton of Switzerland, is also close to major northern Italian cities such as Milan.

=== Agricultural Research and Extension Centers ===
Virginia Tech has several agricultural research and extension centers located throughout the Commonwealth dedicated to improving agricultural practices and the quality of life of Virginia citizens. The Virginia Tech Agricultural Research and Extension Centers are: Alson H. Smith, Jr., Eastern Shore, Eastern Virginia, Hampton Roads, Middleburg, Reynolds Homestead, Shenandoah Valley, Southern Piedmont, Southwest Virginia, Tidewater, and Virginia Seafood.

=== Power plant ===
The campus includes a coal-powered central steam power plant that provides nearly 90 percent of its buildings with heat and electricity. Many miles of tunnels, steam lines, and piping are accessed from a central access point on the Drillfield, and only personnel with confined-space training are permitted to enter the underground network.

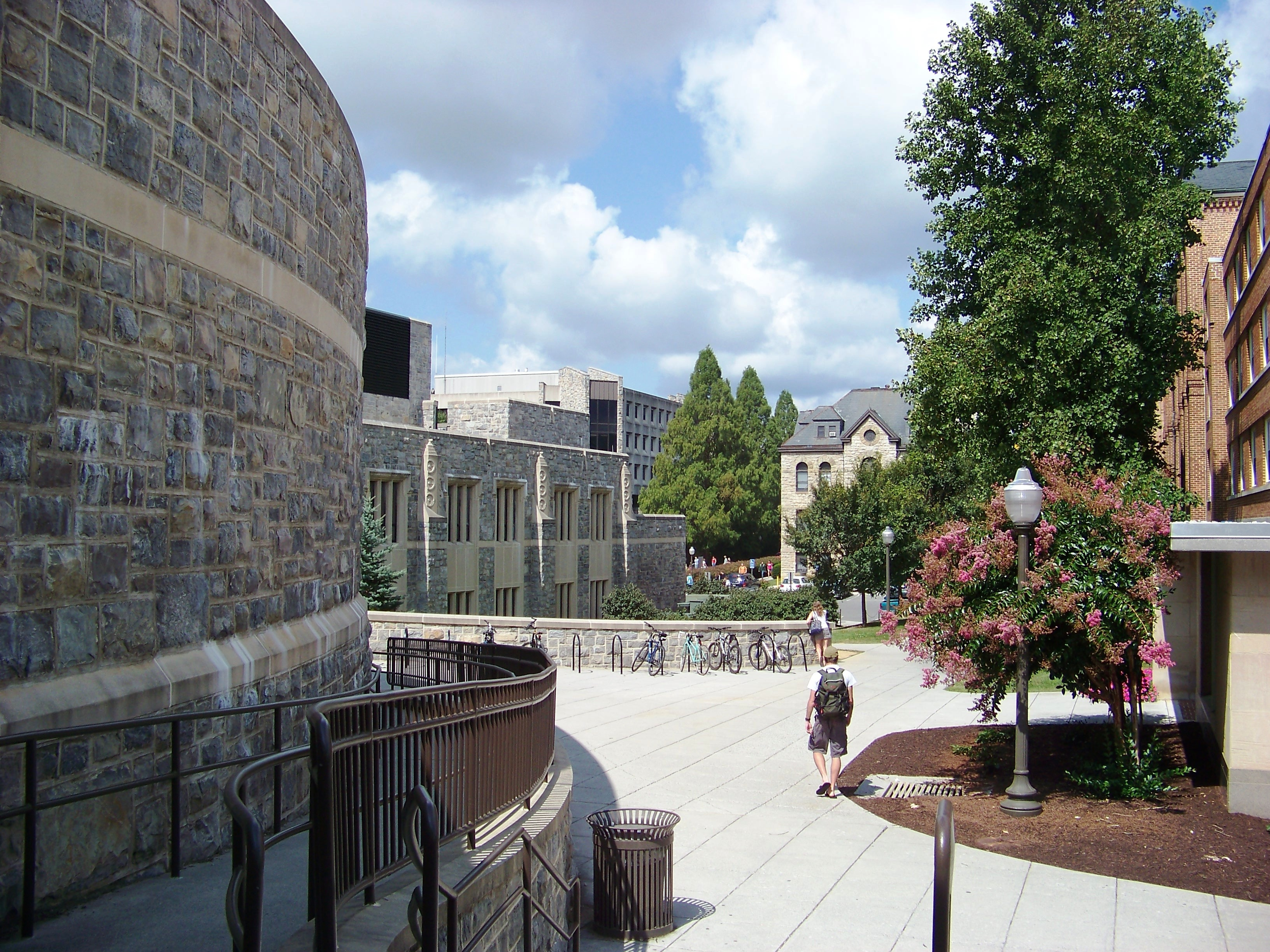
Walkway in the Upper Quad

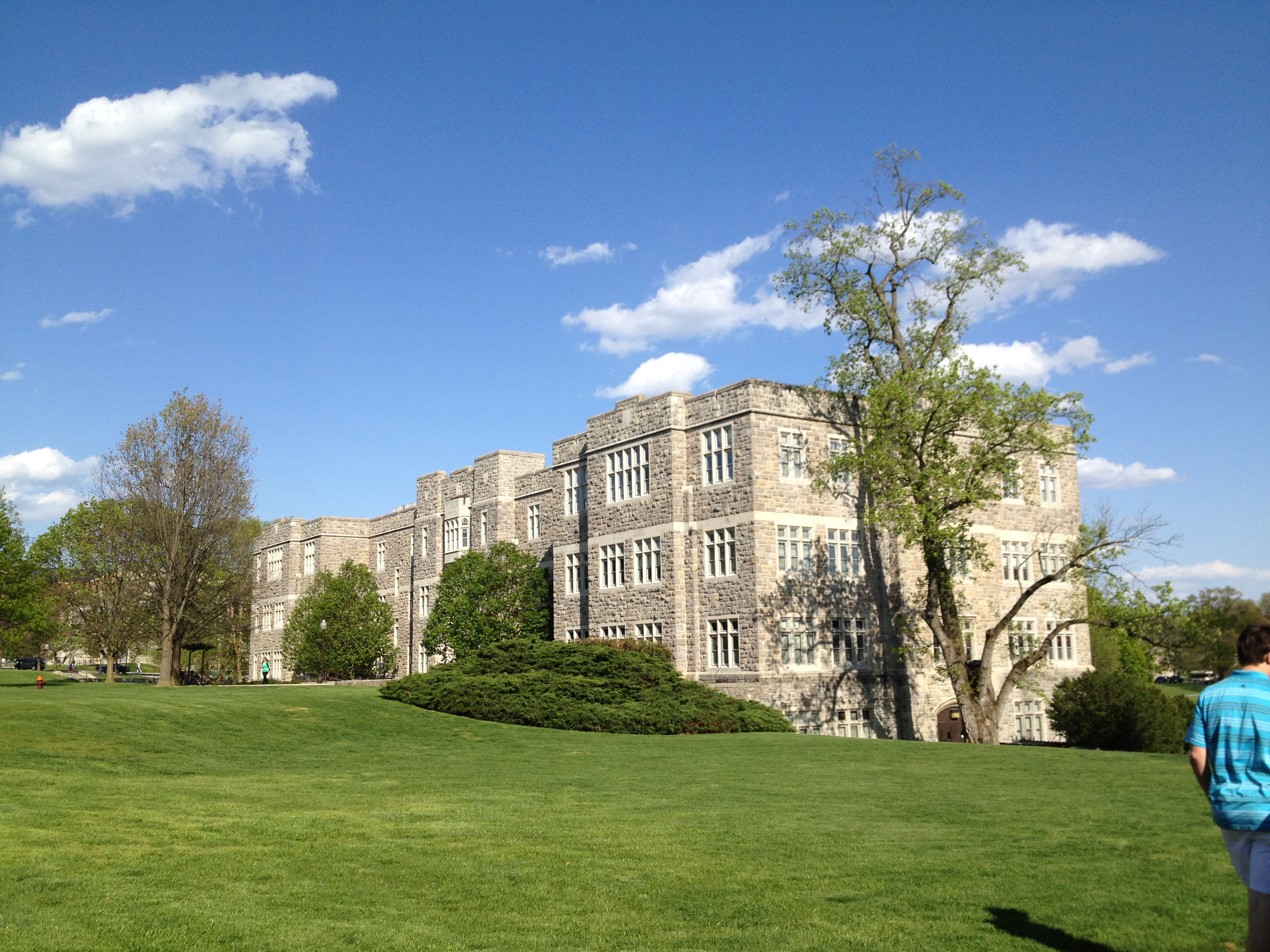
Patton Hall

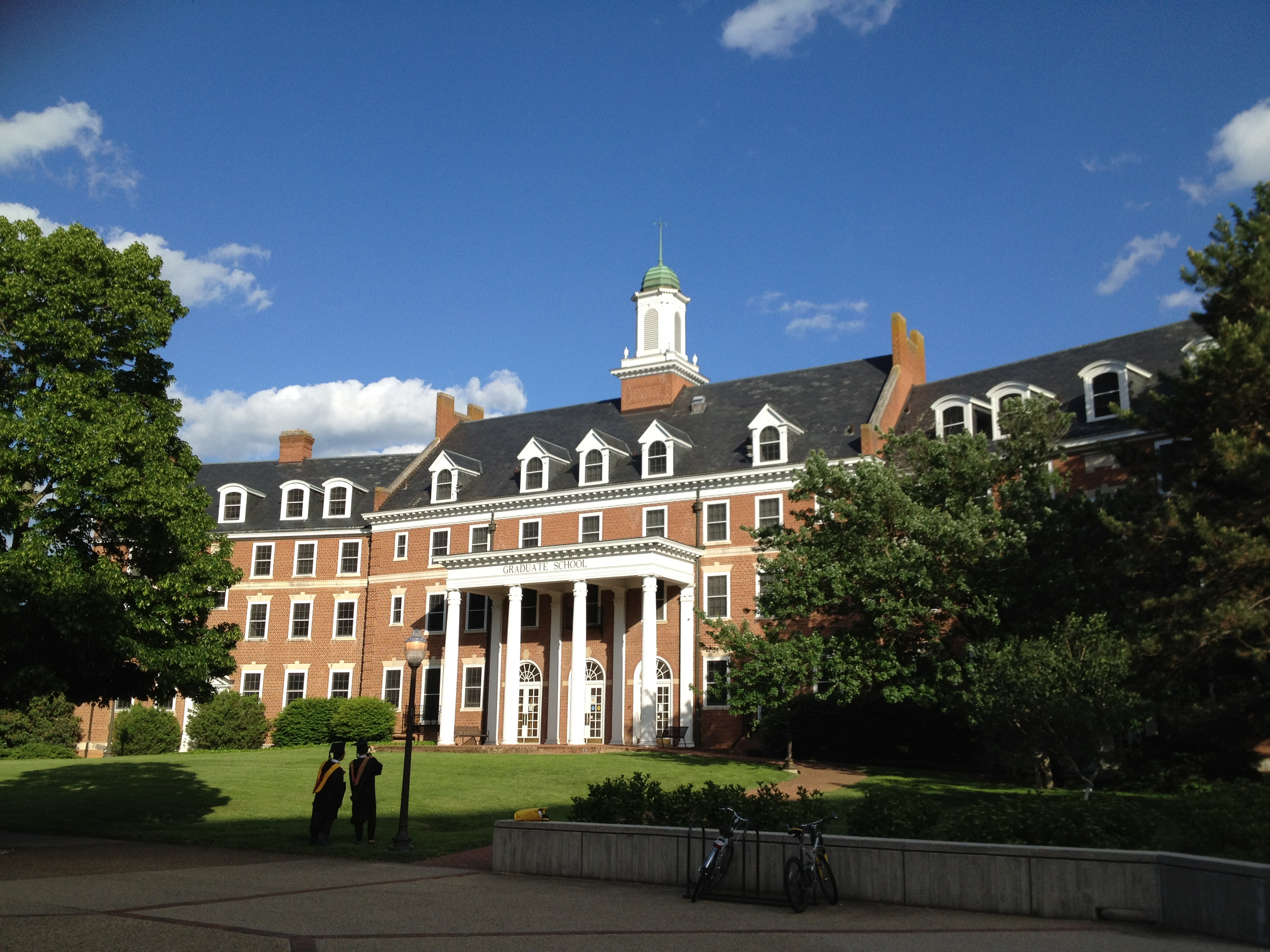
Donaldson-Brown Center

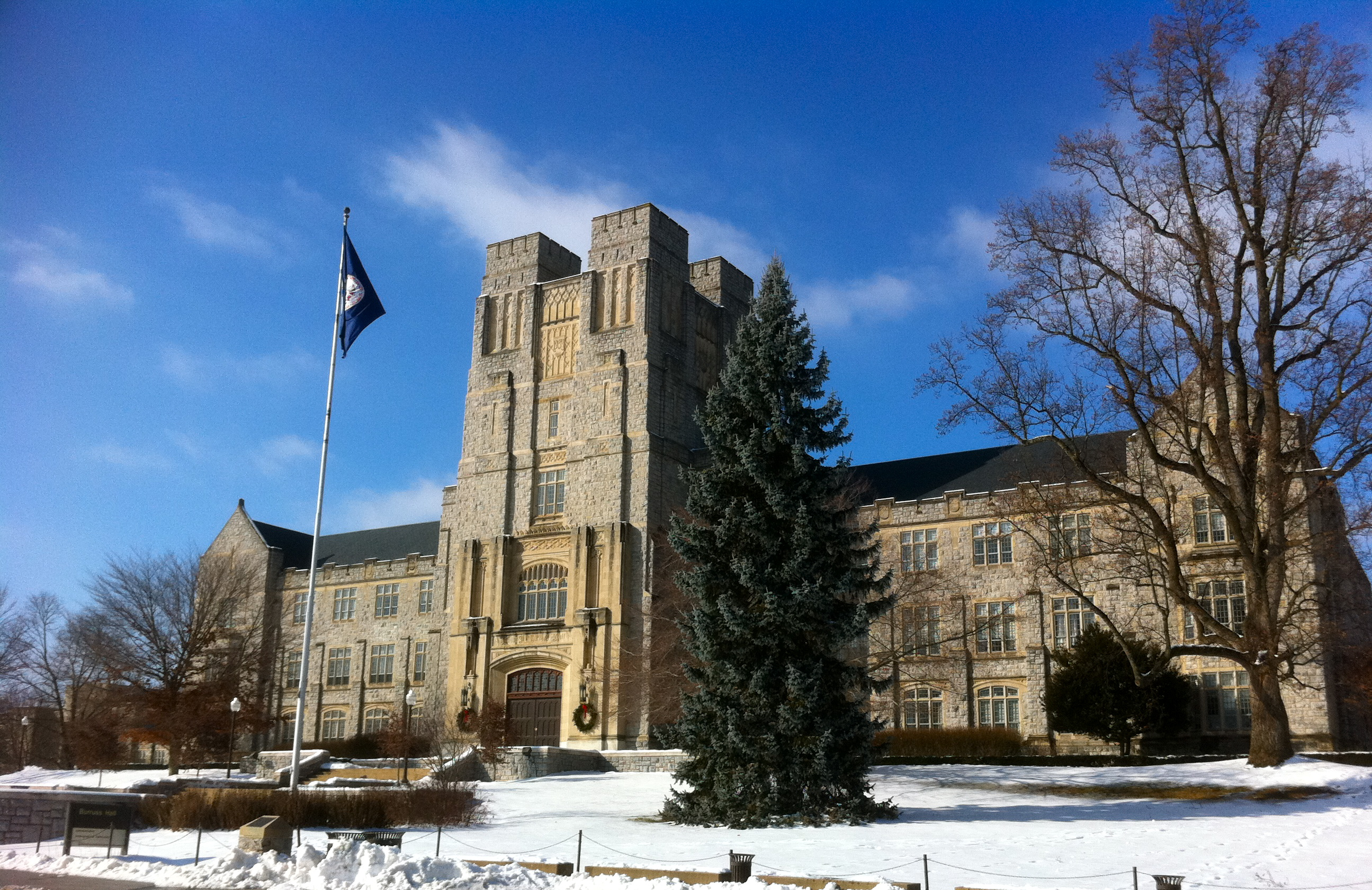
Burruss Hall

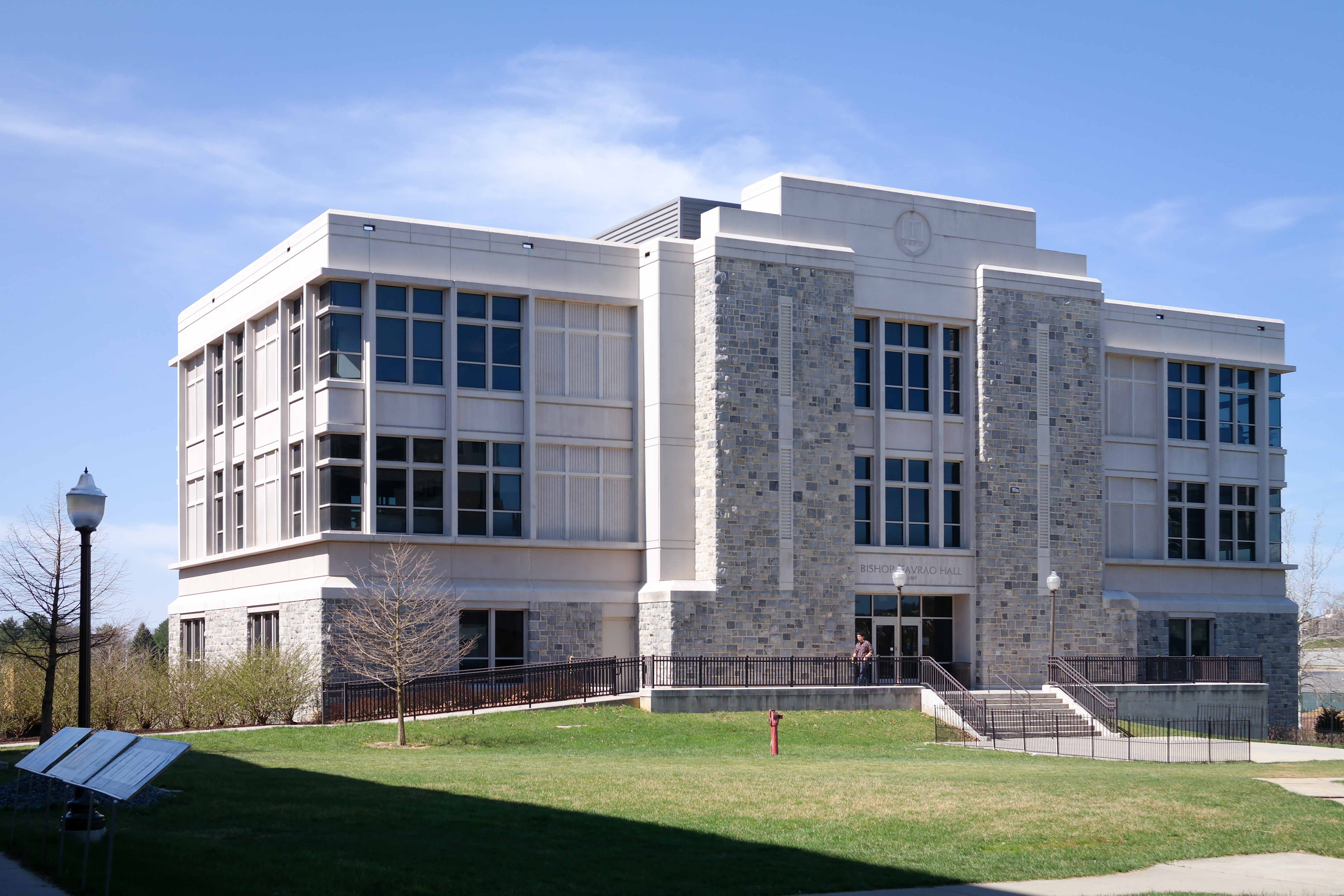
Bishop-Favrao Hall

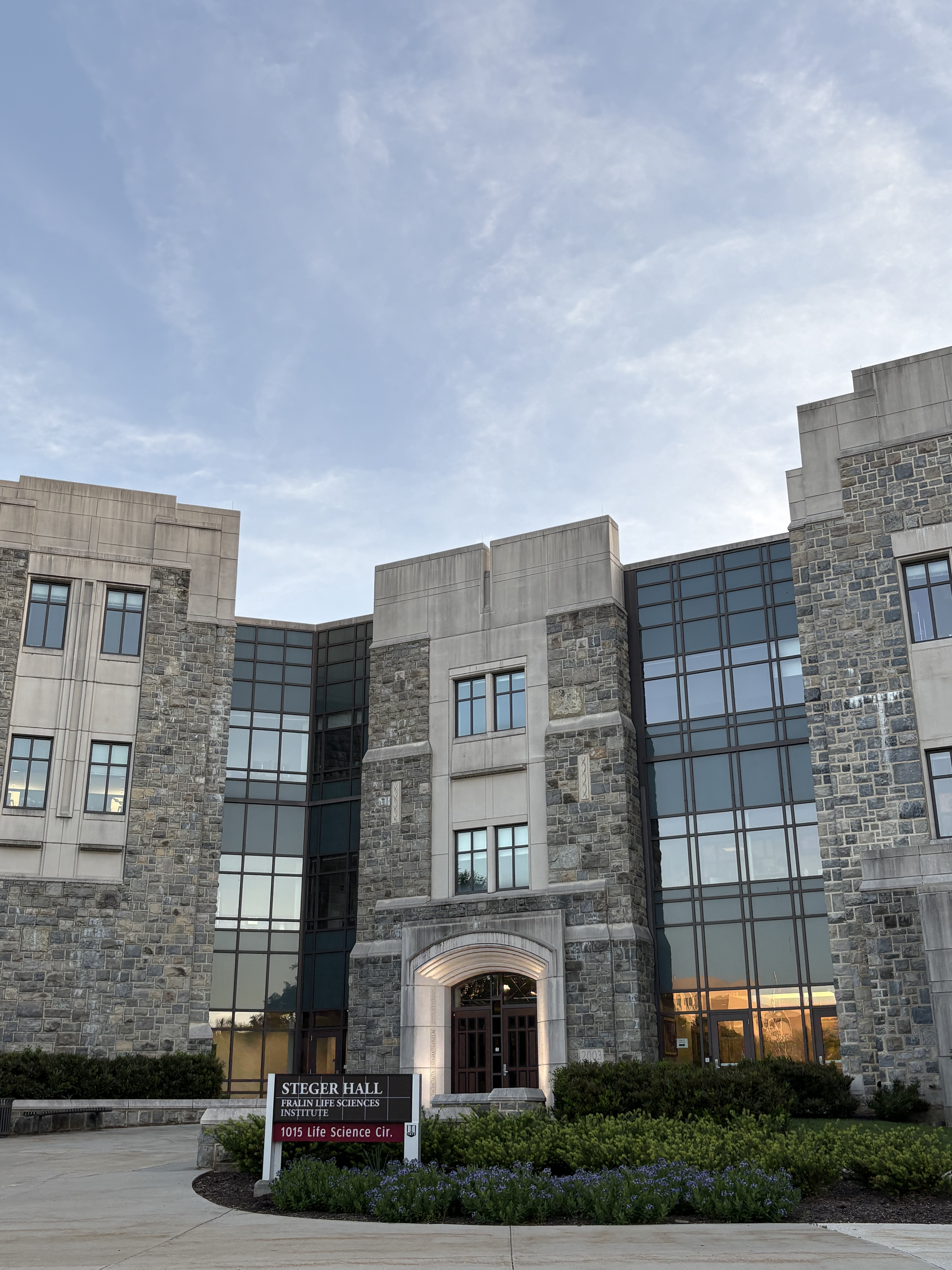
Steger Hall

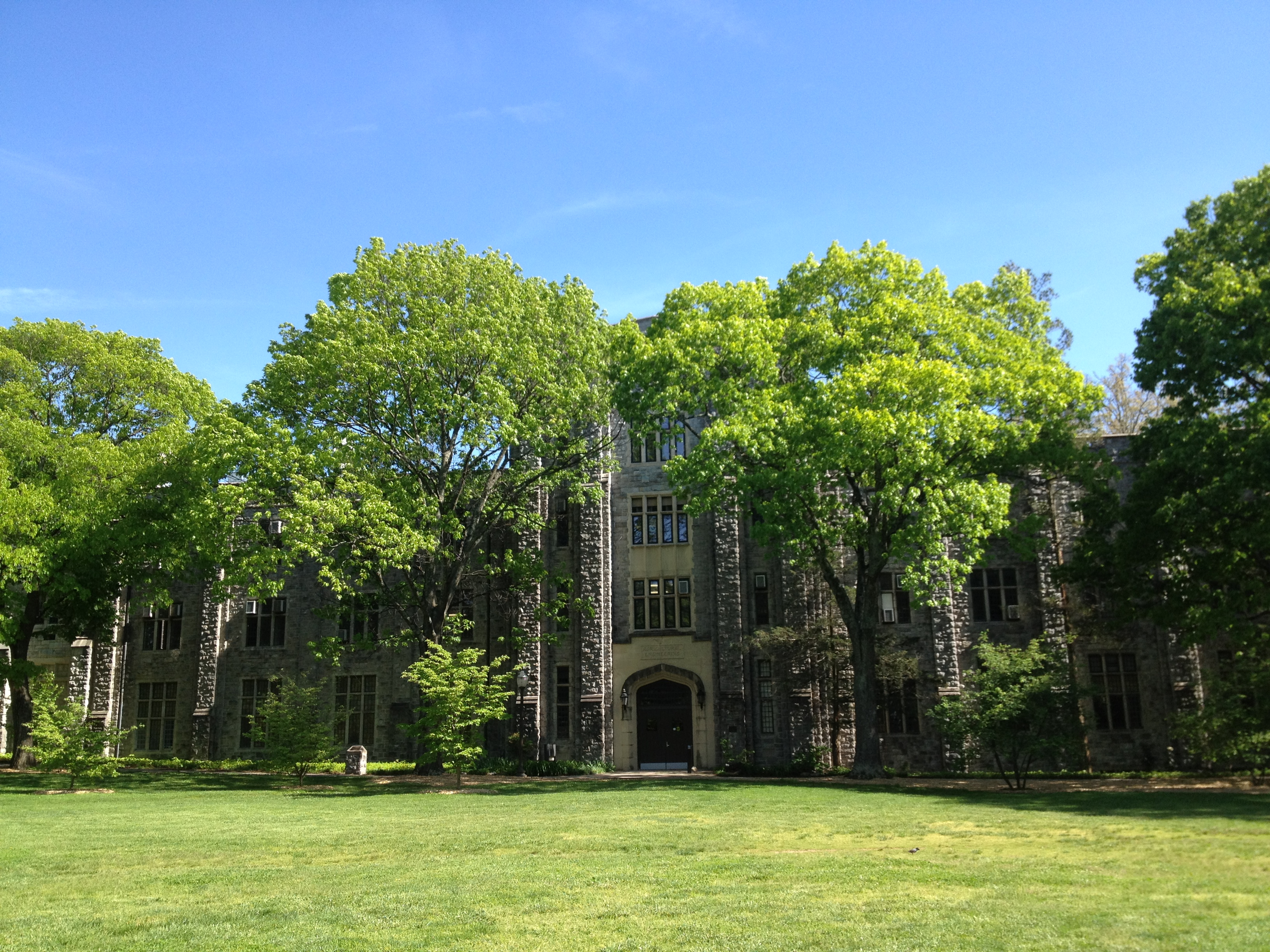
Seitz Hall

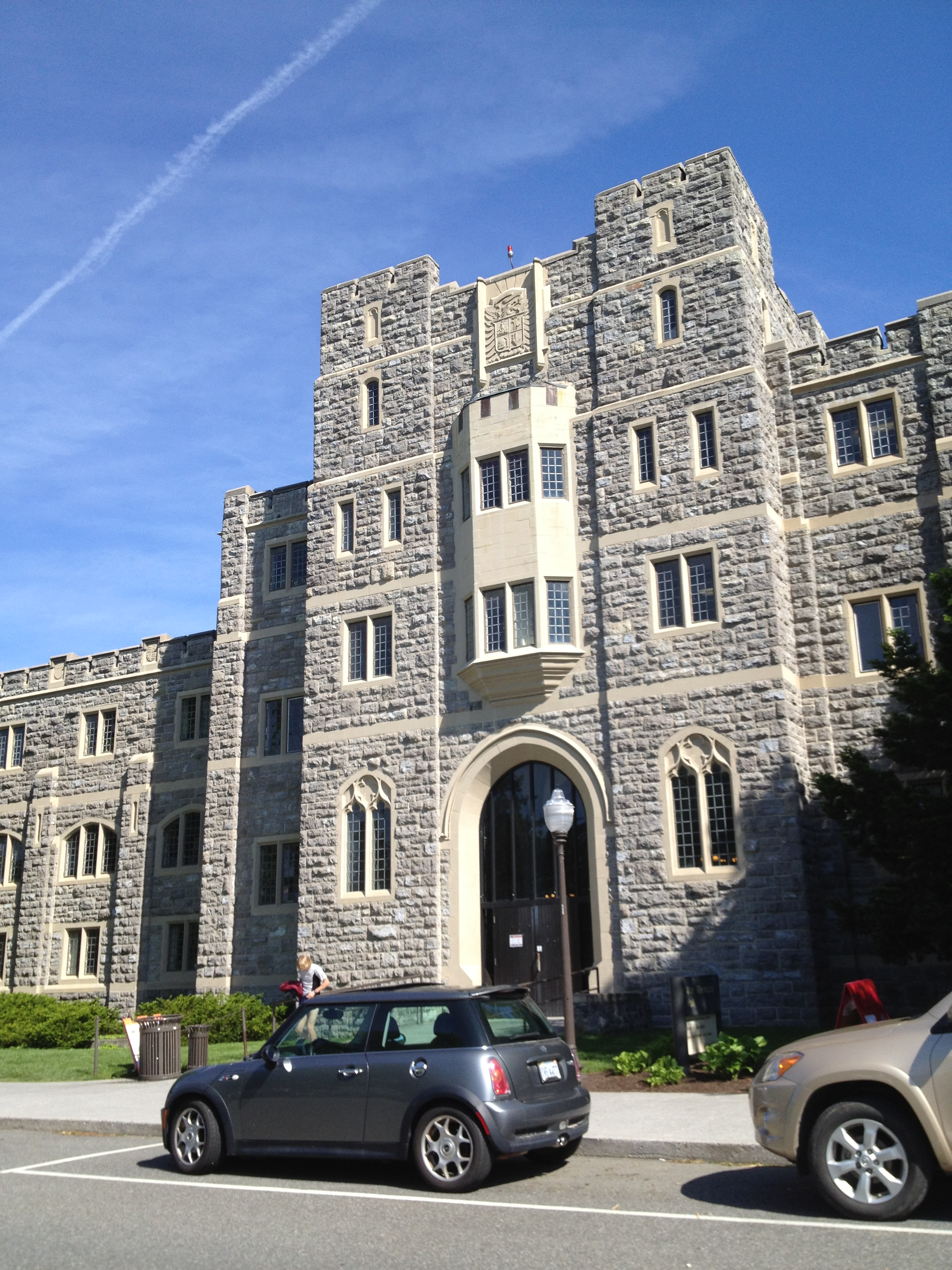
War Memorial Hall

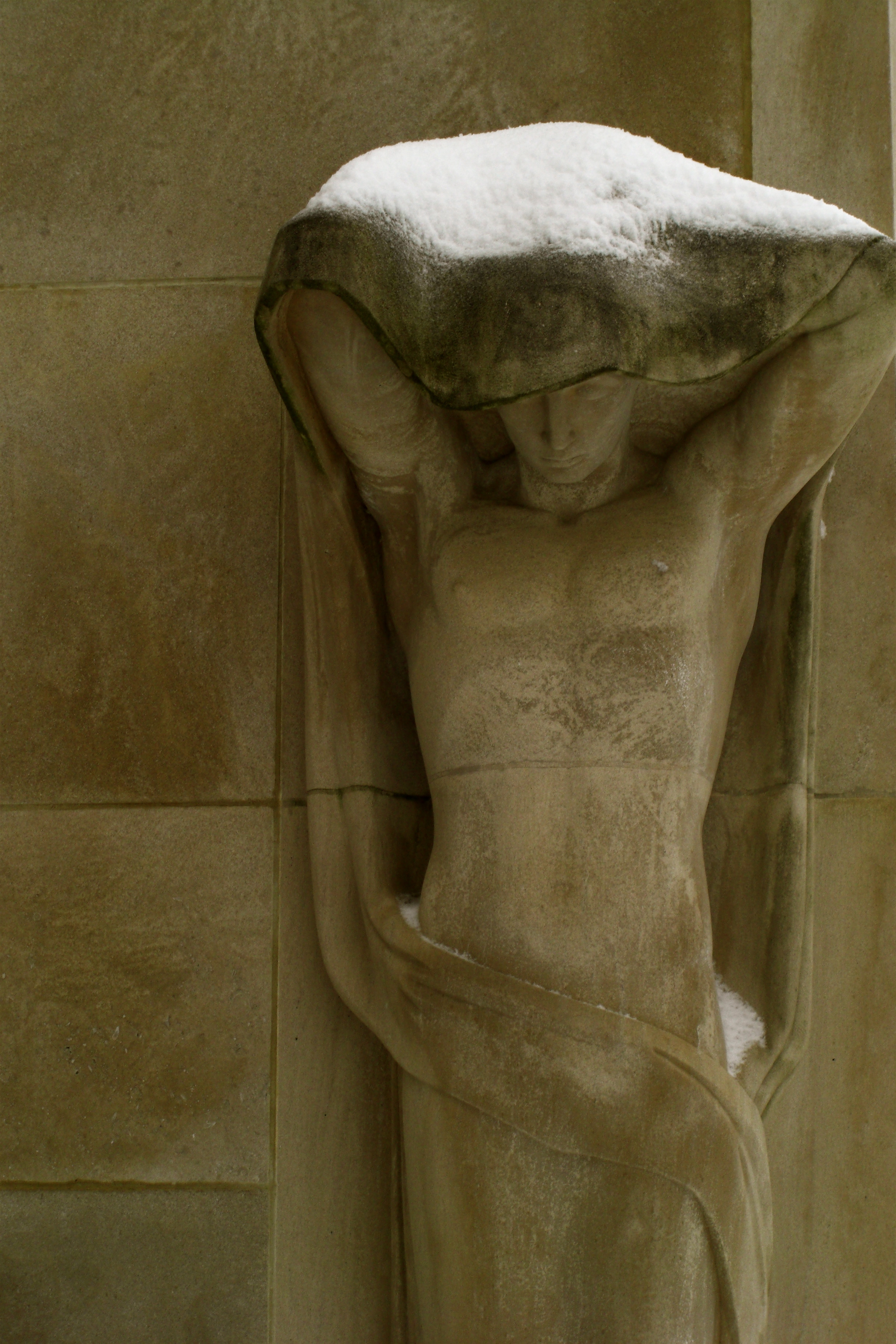
Pylon at the War Memorial Chapel

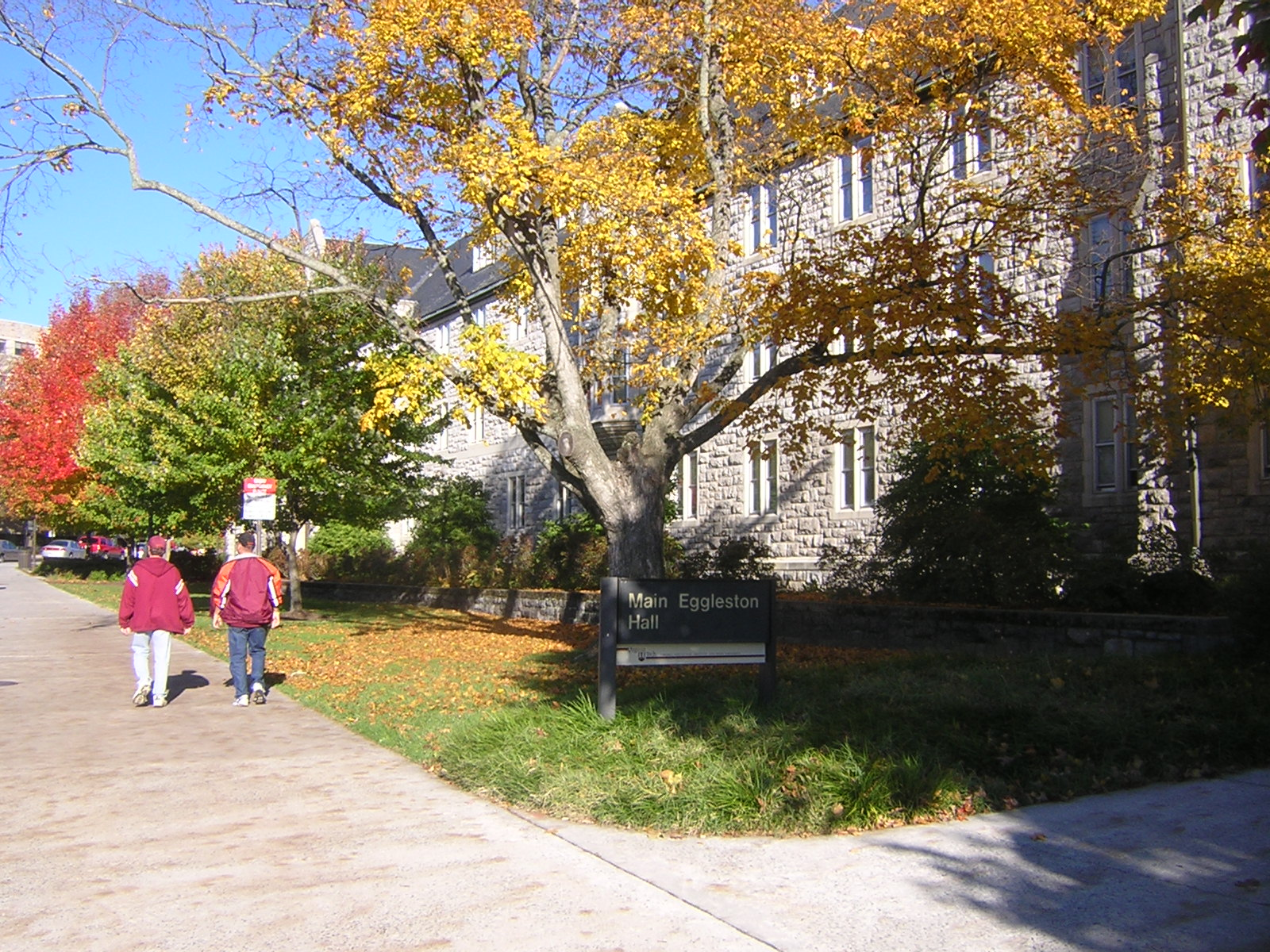
Main Eggleston Hall

== Student life ==
Undergraduate demographics as of Fall 2023
Race and ethnicity	Total
White	58%
Asian	13%
Hispanic	10%
Black	6%
Two or more races	6%
International student	4%
Unknown	3%
Economic diversity
Low-income (Note: The percentage of students who received an income-based federal Pell grant intended for low-income students.)	15%
Affluent (Note: The percentage of students who are a part of the American middle class at the bare minimum.)	85%

There are more than 700 student organizations on campus. Some of these organizations include the Virginia Tech Amateur Radio Association, callsign K4KDJ, the oldest club on campus; Bolt at Virginia Tech, which builds electric racing motorcycles; PRISM, a student-run ad agency; BASIS at Virginia Tech, the largest student-run fixed income portfolio group in the nation (managing $5 million); the Chocolate Milk Club; and a Young Life Chapter.

The Princeton Review ranked Virginia Tech #21 on a list of "Their Students Love These Colleges" from a 2025 survey of students at 391 colleges.

=== Campus residence halls ===
Over 9,300 Virginia Tech students reside on campus.

=== Corps of Cadets ===
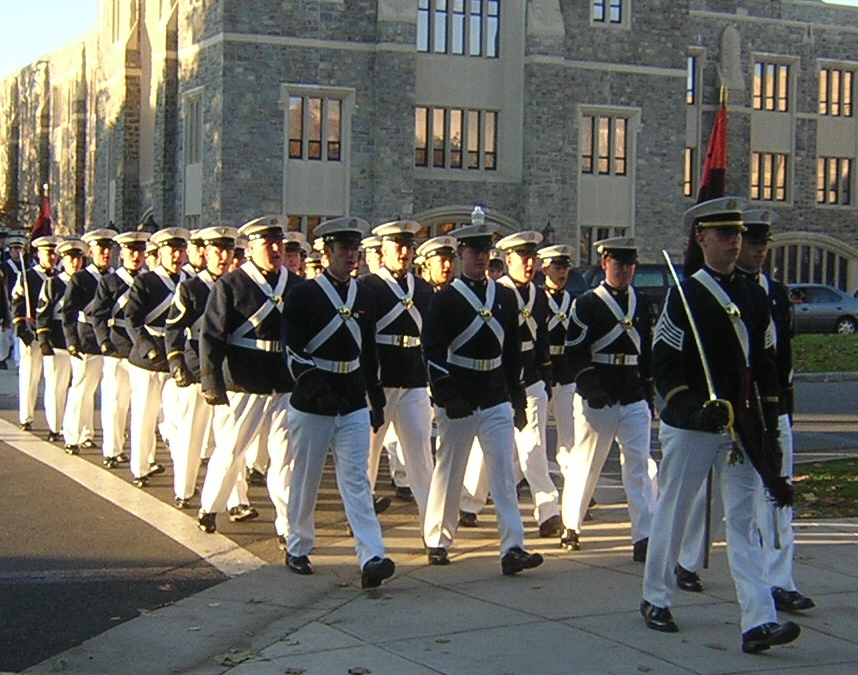
Virginia Tech Corps of Cadets marching

Until 1923, every able-bodied male was required to participate for four years in the Virginia Tech Corps of Cadets. The requirement was changed to two years until 1964, when participation became voluntary. Members of the ROTC program are required to participate in the Corps of Cadets. Virginia Tech remains one of three public universities in the United States with both an active corps of cadets and regular civilian students on its campus (Texas A&M University and the University of North Georgia are the other two).

More than 1,000 cadets reside on the campus of Virginia Tech. The Corps of Cadets Community is located in the Upper Quad, which features some of the oldest buildings on campus. Cadet dorms are also known as "cadet barracks". Two new dormitories were constructed on the Upper Quad to house all of the cadets. Pearson Hall replaced Rasche Hall in November 2015, and in August 2017, Brodie Hall was replaced by the New Cadet Dorm (a.k.a. "New Brodie"). Former cadet dorms, Thomas Hall and Monteith Hall were demolished in 2017. Their sites are planned to be used as green space for the foreseeable future.

=== Greek life ===
Virginia Tech hosts a number of fraternities and sororities across four governing councils. There are 23 IFC fraternities and 13 National Panhellenic Conference sororities recognized at Virginia Tech. The fraternity and sorority community currently encompasses more than 5,500 students which represents just about 20 percent of the undergraduate population. The Oak Lane Community houses those sororities and fraternities which have houses chartered on campus. A number of fraternities have chartered off-campus housing. There are also numerous other academic and service-related sororities and fraternities at the school, as well as various historically Black and cultural interest organizations.

There are also a number of fraternities at Virginia Tech that are not officially recognized by the university.

=== Clubs and student activities ===
Alongside fraternity and sorority life, Virginia Tech offers a variety of clubs and activities officially endorsed by the university. The university claims 800 official clubs as part of its student life and the Student Engagement and Campus Life office as a hub for information on said clubs. A website titled Gobblerconnect is often used by students to find clubs to take part in, while every year the campus holds a "Gobblerfest" where clubs showcase their activities to potential freshmen members.

Notable among these are student-lead production oriented clubs, such as radio station WUVT-FM, newspaper The Collegiate Times, and literary magazine Silhouette.

=== Cultural and community centers ===
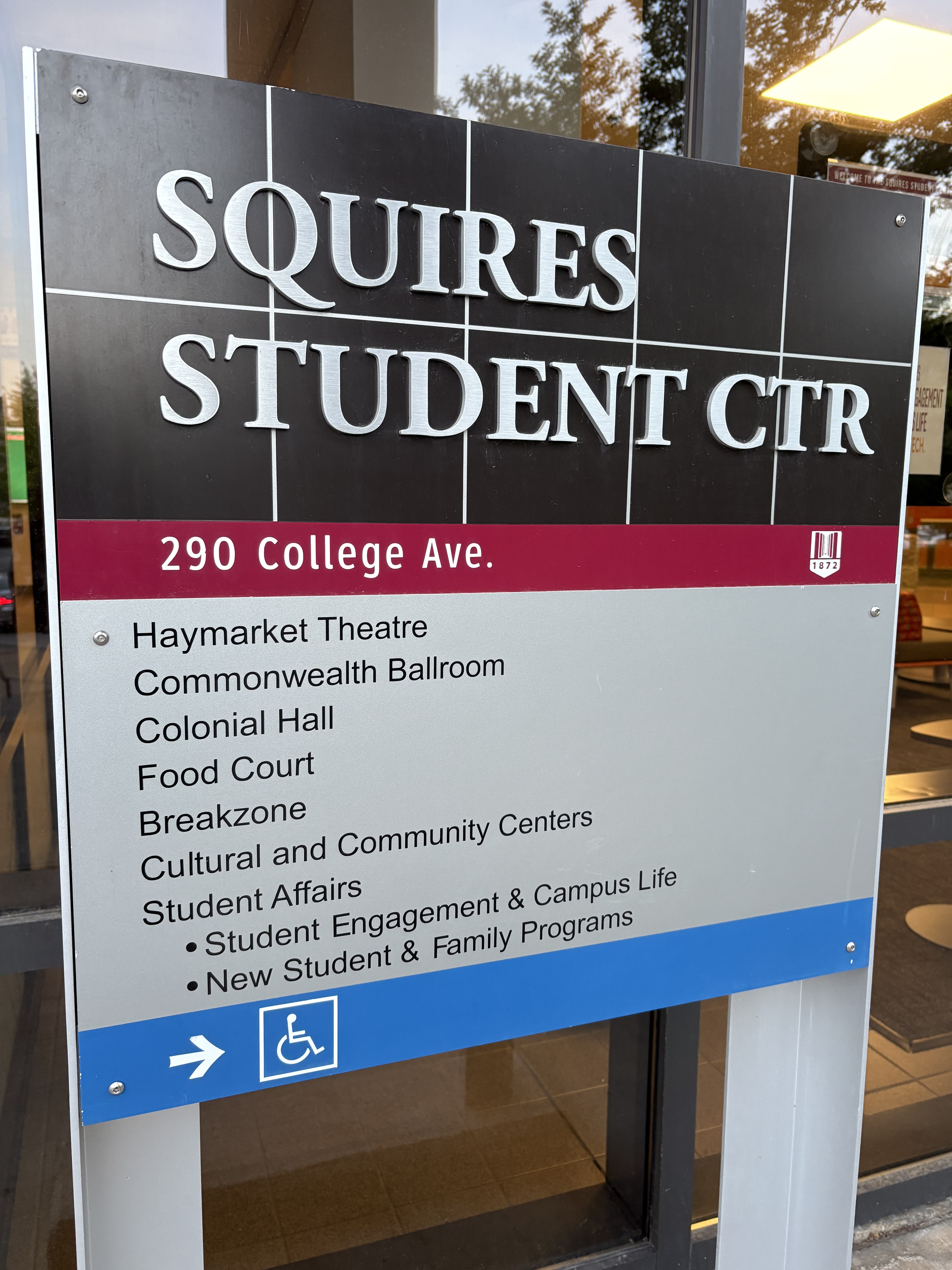
Squires Student Center directory

The Virginia Tech cultural and community centers are designated physical spaces in the Squires Student Center. There are five centers: the Black Cultural Center, the Ati:Wa:Oki Indigenous Community Center, El Centro, the Pride Center, and the APIDA (Asian Pacific Islander Desi American)+ Center. The Black Cultural Center is the longest-standing center, having opened in 1991, and the APIDA+ Center is the newest center, opening in 2019. All of the centers serve as inclusive spaces to the community and offer a variety of educational and support resources as well as various programming and events throughout the school year. Typical programming and events include speaker series, free learning lunches, identity-based support groups, artistic performances, cultural celebrations, holiday celebrations, and achievement ceremonies. In 2023, Virginia Tech was designated as an Asian American Native American Pacific Islander Serving Institution (AANAPISI). Virginia Tech is the fourth higher education institute in the commonwealth of Virginia to be designated as an AANAPISI. It is estimated that around 12% of students at Virginia Tech identify as AANAPI, exceeding the 10% requirement set by the grant. AANAPISI is a Minority Serving Institution designation and grant implemented by the United States Department of Education. The grant program aims to expand access, opportunity, and scholarship for Asian American, Native American, and Pacific Islander students. The AANAPISI grant at Virginia Tech directly supports the programming efforts of the APIDA+ Center.

==== Labor unions ====
In September 2023, two labor unions launched publicly after several years of private efforts to secure wages and job stability. One union, the United Campus Workers of Virginia Tech (UCW-VT), represented faculty and staff, while the other, the Virginia Tech Graduate Labor Union (VT GLU), represented graduate students. These new unions were run by the Virginia Education Association and the United Campus Workers of Virginia, respectively.

==== Diversity, equity, and inclusion ====
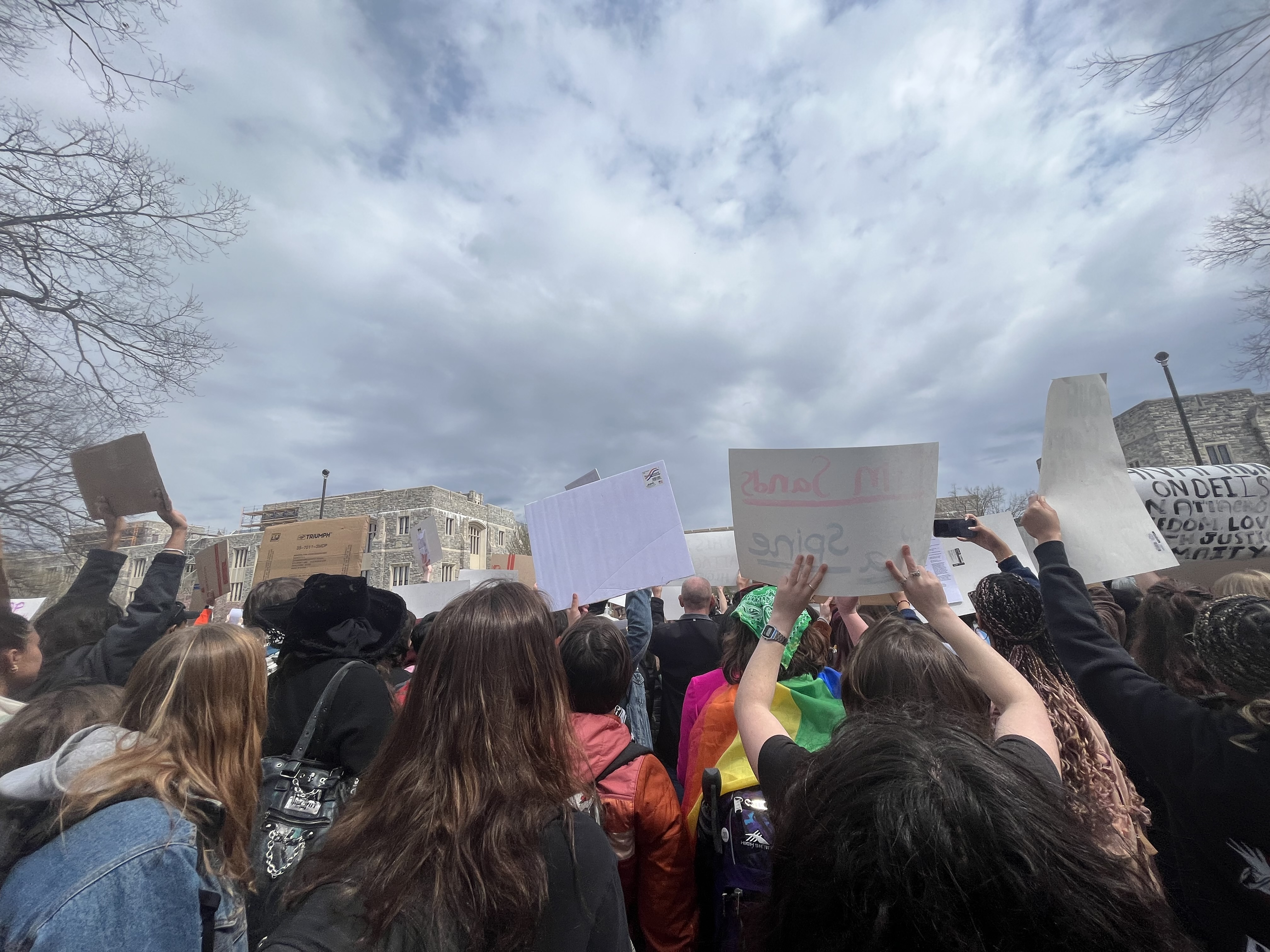
Virginia Tech campus protest, March 25, 2025

As of March 2025, Virginia Tech eliminated its Office of Diversity, Equity, and Inclusion (DEI) and removed the affiliated websites. This action was prompted after a federal executive order enacted by the Trump administration in January demanded the elimination of DEI programs from all schools under the threat of pulling federal funding, along with the “Dear Colleague Letter” released by the Department of Education. The Virginia Tech Board of Visitors voted to remove the office on March 25, 2025, inciting backlash in the community. A marching protest on the Blacksburg campus occurred on the same day in response.

== Athletics ==
Virginia Tech athletics logo

Virginia Tech teams are known as the Hokies. The HokieBird is a turkey-like creature whose form has evolved from the original school mascot of the Fighting Gobbler. While the modern HokieBird still resembles a Fighting Gobbler, the word "Hokie" has all but replaced Fighting Gobbler in terms of colloquial use. The term originated from the Old Hokie yell.

They compete as a member of the National Collegiate Athletic Association (NCAA) Division I level (Football Bowl Subdivision (FBS) sub-level for football), primarily competing in the Atlantic Coast Conference (ACC) for all sports since the 2004–05 season. The Hokies previously competed in the Big East Conference from 2000–01 to 2003–04 (football program from 1991–92 to 1999–2000); the Atlantic 10 Conference (A-10) from 1995–96 to 1999–2000; and the Metro Conference from 1978–79 to 1994–95.

Men's sports include baseball, basketball, cross country, football, golf, soccer, swimming and diving, tennis, track and field, and wrestling. Women's sports include basketball, cross country, field hockey, golf, lacrosse, rowing, soccer, softball, swimming and diving, tennis, track and field, and volleyball.

Virginia Tech's fight song, "Tech Triumph", was written in 1919 and remains in use today. The song is played at sporting events by both the Virginia Tech student band, The Marching Virginians, and the regimental Corps of Cadets' band, the Highty Tighties.

The most prominent athletic facilities are Lane Stadium, Cassell Coliseum, English Field, Thompson Field, Tech Softball Park, Rector Field House, the Beamer-Lawson Indoor Practice Facility, and the Christiansburg Aquatic Center.

== People ==
=== Faculty ===
Notable current and former faculty at Virginia Tech include Nobel laureate James M. Buchanan, MacArthur Fellows Linsey Marr and Marc Edwards, and Guggenheim Fellow Roger Ekirch. Other notable faculty include Romesh Batra (engineering science and mechanics), Patricia Dove (geosciences), Nikki Giovanni (English), Michael Hochella (geosciences), Liviu Librescu (engineering science and mechanics), Tim Luke (political science), Xiang-Jin Meng (virology), Amanda Morris (chemistry), Arun Phadke (electrical engineering), Sanjay Raman (electrical engineering), James Robertson (history), Arthur Squires (chemical engineering), James Thorp (electrical engineering), John Tyson (biology), and Gary Wamsley (public administration).

=== Presidents ===
There have been 17 university heads for Virginia Tech since its founding in 1872. The current president is Timothy Sands (previously provost of Purdue University), who has held the post since 2014. He will be succeeded by Richard Linton, who will take over as the 17th president at the start of the 2027 spring semester.

No.	Image	Name	Term start	Term end	Refs.
Virginia Agricultural and Mechanical College (1872–1896)
1		Charles Landon Carter Minor	August 14, 1872	December 10, 1879	
interim		Charles Robert Scott Ship	August 12, 1880	August 25, 1880	
2		John Lee Buchanan	March 1, 1880	January 17, 1881	
3		Thomas Nelson Conrad	January 17, 1882	July 1, 1886	
4		Lunsford Lindsay Lomax	July 1, 1886	July 1, 1891	
5		John McLaren McBryde	July 1, 1891	September 1, 1907	
Virginia Agricultural and Mechanical College and Polytechnic Institute (1896–1944)
6		Paul Brandon Barringer	September 1, 1907	July 1, 1913	
7		Joseph Dupuy Eggleston	July 1, 1913	July 1, 1919	
8		Julian Ashby Burruss	September 1, 1919	July 1, 1945	
Virginia Polytechnic Institute (1944–1970)
9		John Redd Hutcheson	August 14, 1945	September 1, 1947	
10		Walter Stephenson Newman	September 1, 1947	July 1, 1962	
11		Thomas Marshall Hahn Jr.	July 1, 1962	December 31, 1974	
Virginia Polytechnic Institute and State University (1970–present)
12		William Edward Lavery	January 1, 1975	December 31, 1987	
13		James Douglas McComas	September 1, 1988	December 31, 1993	
14		Paul Ernest Torgersen	January 1, 1994	December 31, 2000	
15		Charles William Steger	January 7, 2000	May 31, 2014	
16		Timothy David Sands	June 1, 2014	present	

=== Alumni ===
Virginia Tech has over 240,000 alumni internationally and from all 50 states. The Virginia Tech Alumni Association has over 100 chapters and has been consistently regarded as one of the best in the nation. VT alumni include 2 Rhodes Scholars, 4 Marshall Scholars, 38 Goldwater Scholars, and 131 Fulbright Scholars. (Note: Virginia Tech students have received 66 Fulbright student awards, for a total of 197.) Among its alumni are 8 Medal of Honor recipients, 97 generals and admirals, governors of two U.S. states, 2 astronauts, and a billionaire. Three Nobel laureates and two MacArthur Fellows have received a degree or served as faculty members at the university.

One of six senior military colleges in the United States, Virginia Tech has produced numerous military leaders, among them 97 generals and admirals, including Carlton D. Everhart II, Commander, Air Mobility Command; Thomas C. Richards, Chief of Staff, Supreme Headquarters Allied Powers Europe; Lance L. Smith, Commander, United States Joint Forces Command; Jody A. Breckenridge, Commander, Coast Guard Pacific Area; Wallace H. Robinson, Director, Defense Supply Agency; and William G. Boykin, Deputy Undersecretary of Defense for Intelligence and Commander of Delta Force.

Eight alumni have been awarded the Medal of Honor, the highest award bestowed by the United States armed forces: Antoine August Michel Gaujot, Julien Edmund Victor Gaujot, Earle Davis Gregory, Herbert Joseph Thomas, Jimmie W. Monteith, Robert Edward Femoyer, Richard Thomas Shea, Jr., Gary Lee Miller; their names are inscribed on a marble cenotaph at the center of War Memorial Court on the Blacksburg campus.

Many VT alumni have also served in civilian leadership roles: Chet Culver, 41st governor of Iowa; J. Lindsay Almond Jr., 58th Governor of Virginia; William Dodd, ambassador to Germany; Linda Swartz Taglialatela, ambassador to Barbados; Rob Wittman, member of the House of Representatives; Tony McNulty, member of the British Parliament; Deborah Hersman, 12th chairperson of the National Transportation Safety Board; Regina Dugan, 19th director, Defense Advanced Research Projects Agency; John H. Thompson, Director of the United States Census Bureau; Erika McEntarfer, 16th Commissioner of Labor Statistics; Lawrence Koontz, Senior Justice of the Supreme Court of Virginia, and William K. Barlow, Garrett McGuire, and Matt Lohr, members of the Virginia House of Delegates.

Outside of public service, Virginia Tech alumni have made notable contributions in various fields of science as well as business, literature, music and journalism. These include physicist and Nobel laureate Robert Coleman Richardson; children's book author and Newbery Medal recipient Kwame Alexander; author and former NASA engineer Homer Hickham; jazz guitarist Charlie Byrd; business executive Donaldson Brown; Boeing president and CEO Dave Calhoun; philanthropist and Georgia-Pacific CEO Robert B. Pamplin; astronauts Charles Camarda and Roger Crouch; structural biologist Bil Clemons; television news anchor Hoda Kotb; and mathematician Gladys West.

Notable Virginia Tech athletes include Joey Slye, Nickeil Alexander-Walker, Frank Beamer, Allan Bristow, Kam Chancellor, Bimbo Coles, Dell Curry, Ace Custis, Terrell Edmunds, Tremaine Edmunds, Bud Foster, Kendall Fuller, Kyle Fuller, Chuck Hartman, Sally Miles, Johnny Oates, Bruce Smith, Tyrod Taylor, DeAngelo Hall, Eddie Royal, André Davis, Angela Tincher, and Michael Vick.

== See also ==
- Fighting Gobblers
- Hahn Horticulture Garden
- List of forestry universities and colleges
- Virginia Tech commencement speakers
