= Walter Stephenson Newman =

American university administrator

10th President of Virginia Polytechnic Institute and State University
- In office 1947–1962
- Preceded by: John Redd Hutcheson
- Succeeded by: T. Marshall Hahn

Personal details
- Born: July 20, 1895 Woodstock, Virginia, U.S.
- Died: June 29, 1978 (aged 82) Blacksburg, Virginia, U.S.

Walter Stephenson Newman (July 20, 1895 – June 29, 1978) was the tenth President of Virginia Tech, serving from 1947 until 1962.

== Early life and education ==
Walter Stephenson Newman was born in 1895 in Woodstock, Virginia to Walter and Sallie Newman. He earned his bachelor's degree from Hampden-Sydney College, his master's from VPI and his Ph.D. from Pennsylvania State University.

== Career ==
Newman taught Vocational Agriculture in Windsor, Virginia, and later was an associate professor in vocational education at VPI from 1922 to 1936 when he became state superintendent of vocational education. He also was the assistant superintendent of public instruction. Additionally, he served as state administrator of the National Youth Administration from 1936 to 1942. He was a highly respected educator and was one of the founders of the Future Farmers of Virginia which ultimately grew to become the National FFA Organization.

Newman returned to Virginia Tech as vice president in 1945, and took over as acting president in 1946 when John Redd Hutcheson became ill and had to be hospitalized. He was appointed president a year later in 1947. As president of Virginia Tech, he laid the groundwork for the small land grant college's development into a major research university. Newman conferred more degrees than all of his predecessors combined and oversaw more than $20,000,000 in campus construction. Newman put greater emphasis on research and graduate programs than any previous president, and several new graduate degree programs were established during his tenure.

Newman resigned from Virginia Tech after suffering a heart attack in 1961. He later became president of the National Bank of Blacksburg, a position he held until his death.

== Personal life ==
Newman married Liz Otey Hoge in 1923 and they had one son also named Walter.

== Honors ==
Newman was the first recipient of Virginia Tech's prestigious Ruffner Medal. Newman Hall, a residence Hall in the President's Quad on the Virginia Tech Campus, is named for Newman.
