= Whitethorn (Blacksburg, Virginia) =

Historic house in Virginia, United States

- Whitethorne
- U.S. National Register of Historic Places
- Virginia Landmarks Register
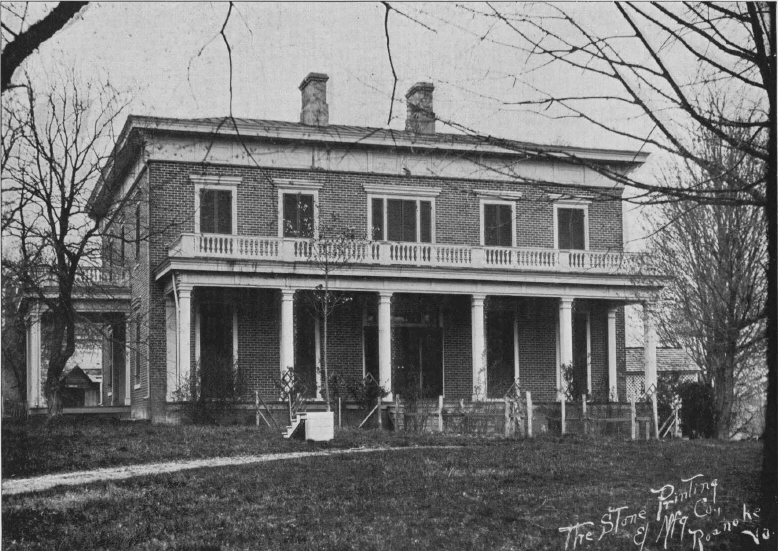
- Whitethorne, 1898

- Location within Virginia Location within the United States
- Location: 200 Monticello Lane Blacksburg, Virginia
- Coordinates: 37°12′31″N 80°27′4″W
- Area: 4 acres (1.6 ha)
- Built: c. 1855
- Architectural style: Greek Revival, Italian Villa
- MPS: Montgomery County MPS
- NRHP reference No.: 89001879
- VLR No.: 150-5021

Significant dates
- Added to NRHP: November 13, 1989
- Designated VLR: June 20, 1989

Whitethorne is a historic plantation house located at Blacksburg, Montgomery County, Virginia. It was built about 1855, by James Francis Preston, who received the land from his father, Governor of Virginia, James Patton Preston. It is a large two-story, L-shaped, five-bay-by-three-bay, brick dwelling with a shallow hipped roof in the Italian Villa style. It has Greek Revival-style exterior and interior decorative elements. It features a wide, elegant, one-story, five-bay front porch supported by square columns of the Tuscan order. Also on the property is a contributing two-story brick office building.

Preston, a graduate of the United States Military Academy at West Point was a lawyer by trade. He was commissioned a captain in the 1st Regiment of Virginia Volunteers at the outset of the Mexican–American War in 1846. He served in Mexico from January 16, 1847, to July 31, 1848. Upon returning home from the war he resumed his law practice.

When Virginia seceded from the Union Preston commissioned into the Virginia Militia, and was subsequently transferred to the Confederate Army, on April 24, 1861. He was promoted to colonel in the Confederate army and became the commanding officer of the 4th Virginia Infantry under brigade commander Stonewall Jackson. He commanded the 4th Virginia at First Manassas where he was wounded in battle. After several months of tending to his wound while in the army, including a brief two-week stint as a brigade commander, due to his failing health he was forced to resign his commission and returned home to Whitethorn. Preston did not live to see the end of the war. He died on January 20, 1862, at age 49.

Whitethorne remained in the Preston family until 1889 when it was purchased by Beverly Stockton Heth, a Radford Banker and son of Chesterfield County coal mine magnate John Heth. In the early 1970s the majority of the 1,500 acre estate was sold for the Hethwood development, a planned community that includes single family homes, townhomes, apartments and a shopping center. The home and 50 acres of the property are still owned by Heth family descendants after much of the remaining farmland was sold to Virginia Tech in 2001.

Whitethorne was listed on the National Register of Historic Places in 1989.

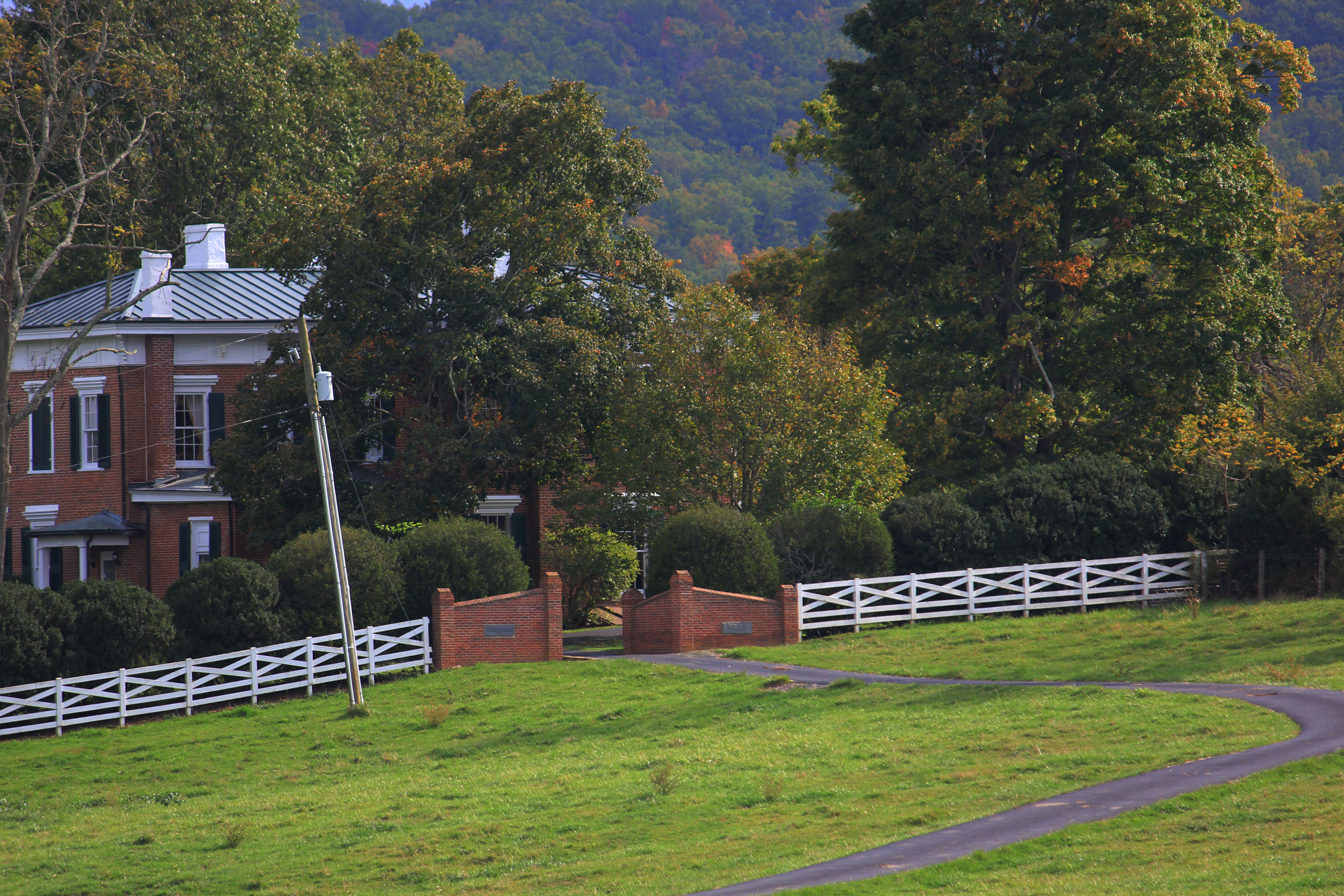
Whitethorn in September 2012
