= Solitude (Blacksburg, Virginia) =

Historic house in Virginia, United States

- U.S. National Register of Historic Places
- Virginia Landmarks Register
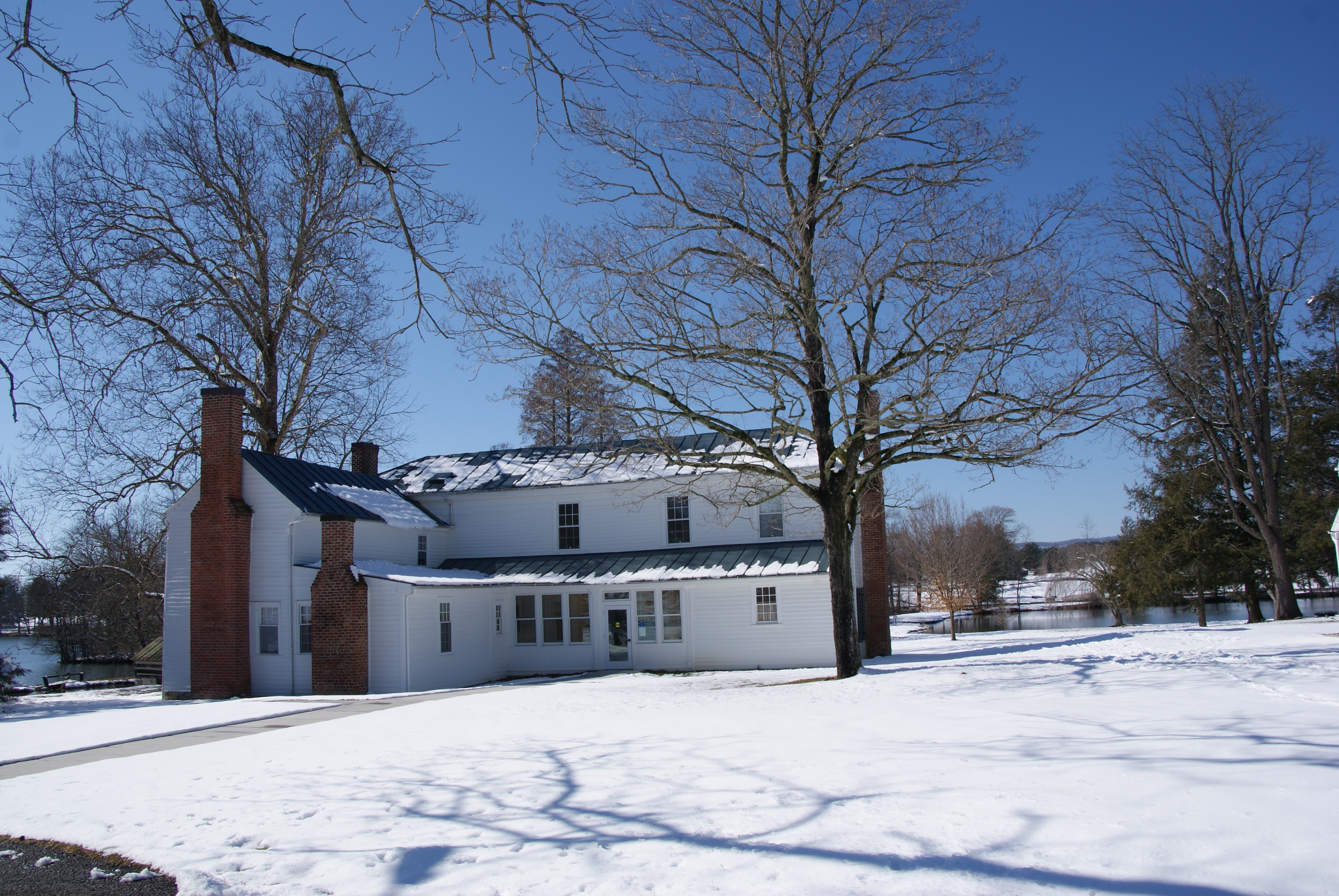
- Solitude, February 2012

- Location within Virginia Location within the United States
- Location: West Campus Drive on Virginia Polytechnic Institute campus, Blacksburg, Virginia
- Coordinates: 37°13′34″N 80°25′38″W
- Area: 3 acres (1.2 ha)
- Built: c. 1804
- Architectural style: Hall-parlor;Single-pile
- NRHP reference No.: 89000363
- VLR No.: 150-0100-0003

Significant dates
- Added to NRHP: May 5, 1989
- Designated VLR: June 21, 1988

Solitude is a historic home located on the campus of Virginia Polytechnic Institute at Blacksburg, Montgomery County, Virginia. The earliest section was built about 1802, and expanded first in circa 1834 and then in the 1850s by Col. Robert Preston, who received the land surrounding Solitude from his father, Virginia Governor James Patton Preston. Dating back over 200 years, Solitude is the oldest building on the Virginia Tech Blacksburg campus.

It is a two-story, L-shaped, five bay, log and frame dwelling with a hipped roof. Mid 19th century modifications gave the farmhouse a Greek Revival look. Also on the property are the contributing stone spring house with log superstructure and an outbuilding built in about 1844 and renamed in 2019 by the Virginia Tech Board of Visitors as the Fraction Family House at Solitude. This new name recognizes its usage as a dwelling for the largest enslaved population living on the site and symbolically recognizes all enslaved at Solitude. In 1872, the 250 acre Solitude farm became the part of the central campus of Virginia Agricultural and Mechanical College, serving primarily as the college's farm. The farm house, after the death of its owner, Robert Taylor Preston, in the following decade, served as a college infirmary from 1882 to 1886. It, as well as the Fraction Family House, was then used as faculty housing for the next 60 years. In the 1940s it briefly was a clubhouse for returning World War II veterans who lived in a trailer park surrounding the building while attending Virginia Polytechnic Institute. At that time, dances regularly were held in Solitude's two front parlors. In the 1960s and 1970s, Solitude was used by the Hokie Club in addition to housing faculty in two apartments. Academic programs started using the building in 1974. For some time, Solitude housed a human nutrition and food laboratory and interior design studios and offices. Its last occupant was the Appalachian Studies Program, which has returned following the restoration of the building. Also located in the building is the Henry H. Wiss Center for Theory and History of Art and Architecture. Solitude had been vacant for many years prior to a $1 million (~$1.4 million in 2024) restoration that began in July 2010 and lasted half-a-year. Much of the project was funded by the Mary Morton Parsons Foundation of Richmond, Va.

The house is situated in a landscaped park adjacent to the central campus of Virginia Polytechnic Institute. It was listed on the Virginia Landmarks Register in 1988 and was added to the National Register of Historic Places in 1989.

After Solitude's listing on NRHP, decade-long research and archaeology commenced to further study the main house, property, and overall site to extrapolate further historical information and evaluate what would be needed to restore the house and outbuildings. These efforts culminated in a 2000 Master's thesis by Michael Pulice, a then-Master's of Science candidate in Virginia Tech's Architecture Department, now the chief architectural historian for the Western Regional office (Salem, VA) of the Virginia Department of Historic Resources. Pulice concluded in his thesis that the remaining log outbuilding, long believed to be either a doctor's office or kitchen, is a surviving slave cabin and servants quarters.
