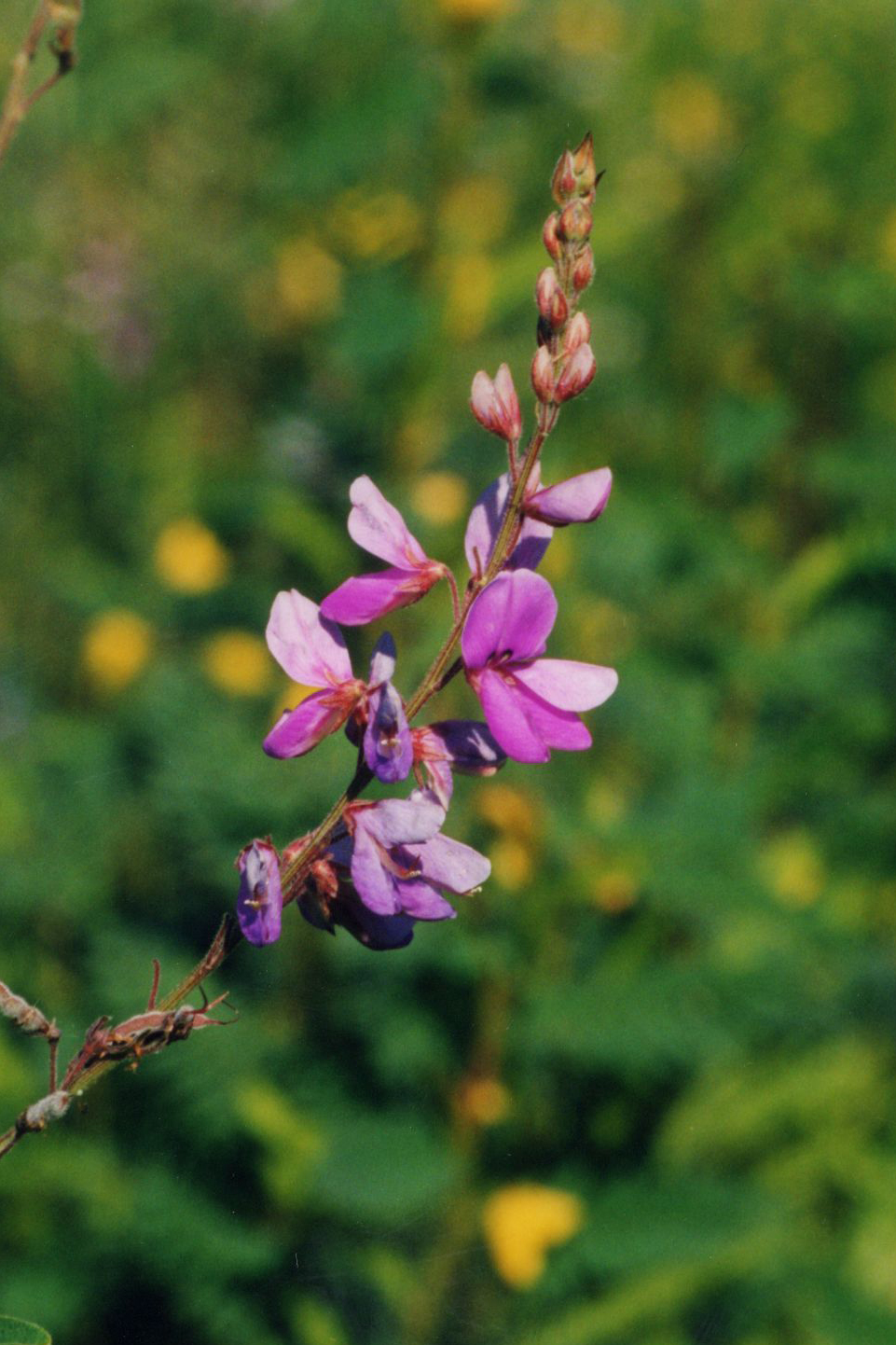

Conservation status
- Secure (NatureServe)

Scientific classification
- Kingdom: Plantae
- Clade: Embryophytes
- Clade: Tracheophytes
- Clade: Spermatophytes
- Clade: Angiosperms
- Clade: Eudicots
- Clade: Rosids
- Order: Fabales
- Family: Fabaceae
- Subfamily: Faboideae
- Genus: Desmodium
- Species: D. canadense

Binomial name
- Desmodium canadense (L.) DC.

Synonyms
- Hedysarum canadense L.; Meibomia canadensis Kuntze; Hedysarum scabrum Moench; Edusaron canadense (L.) Medik.; Pleurolobus canadensis (L.) MacMill.; Desmodium canadense var. minus Hook.

= Desmodium canadense =

Species of legume

Desmodium canadense is a species of flowering plant in the legume family, Fabaceae. It is native to eastern North America. Its common names include showy tick-trefoil, Canadian tick-trefoil, and Canada tickclover.

The plant is a perennial herb and grows in woods, prairies, and disturbed habitat, such as roadsides. It is cultivated as an ornamental plant. It is a larval host plant for butterflies such as the eastern tailed-blue, silver-spotted skipper, and hoary edge. The plant attracts butterflies and hummingbirds. Flowers are pea-shaped, pink to purple in color, and bloom between July and September.

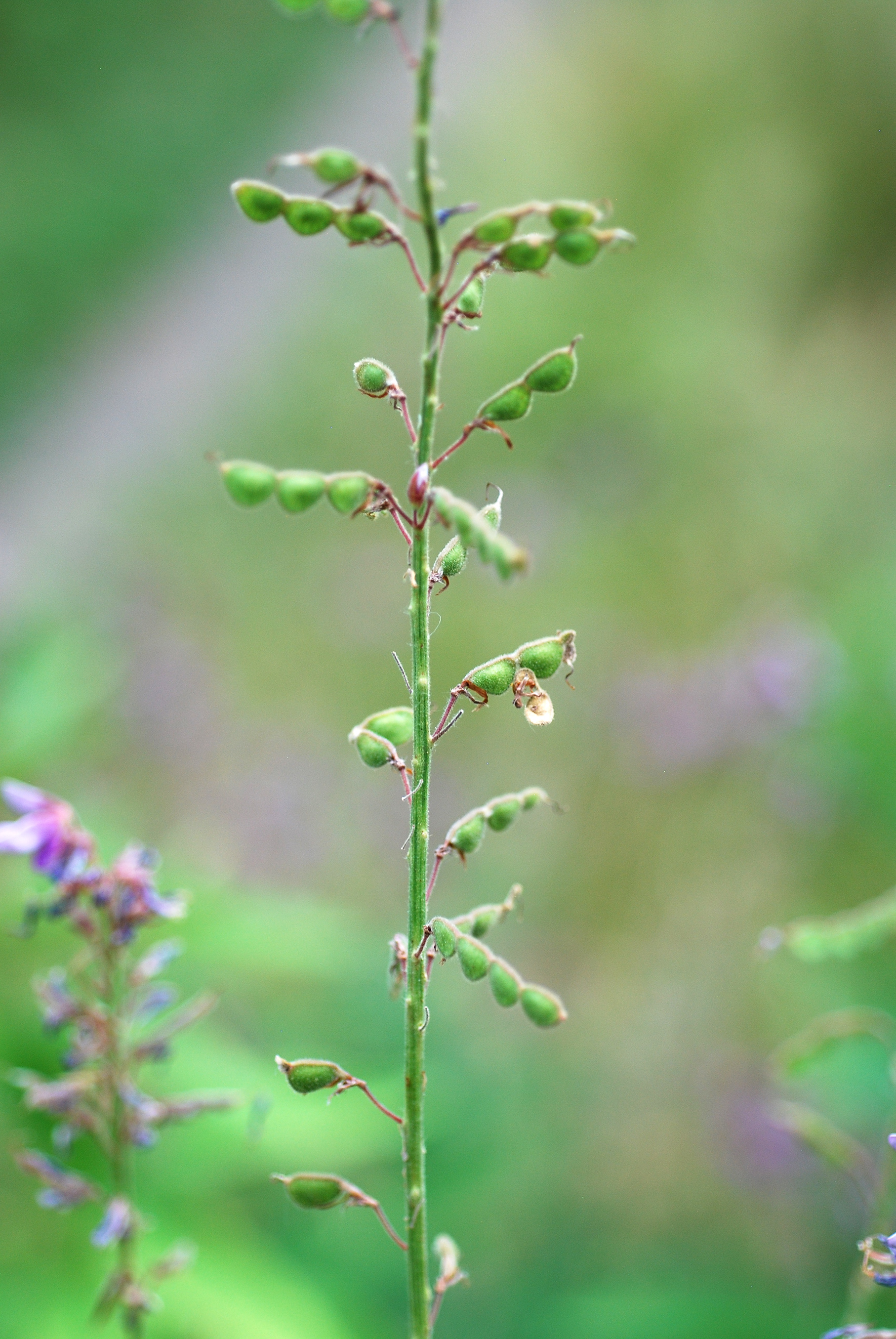

Desmodium canadense is being investigated as a possible source of bean pod mottle virus in soybean plants. As a carrier of the virus, it may be passing it to the bean leaf beetle, which is passing it in turn to soybean crops. This virus causes severe systemic mottling and mild leaf puckering. This can reduce seed size and pod set, which causes a decrease in crop yields.
