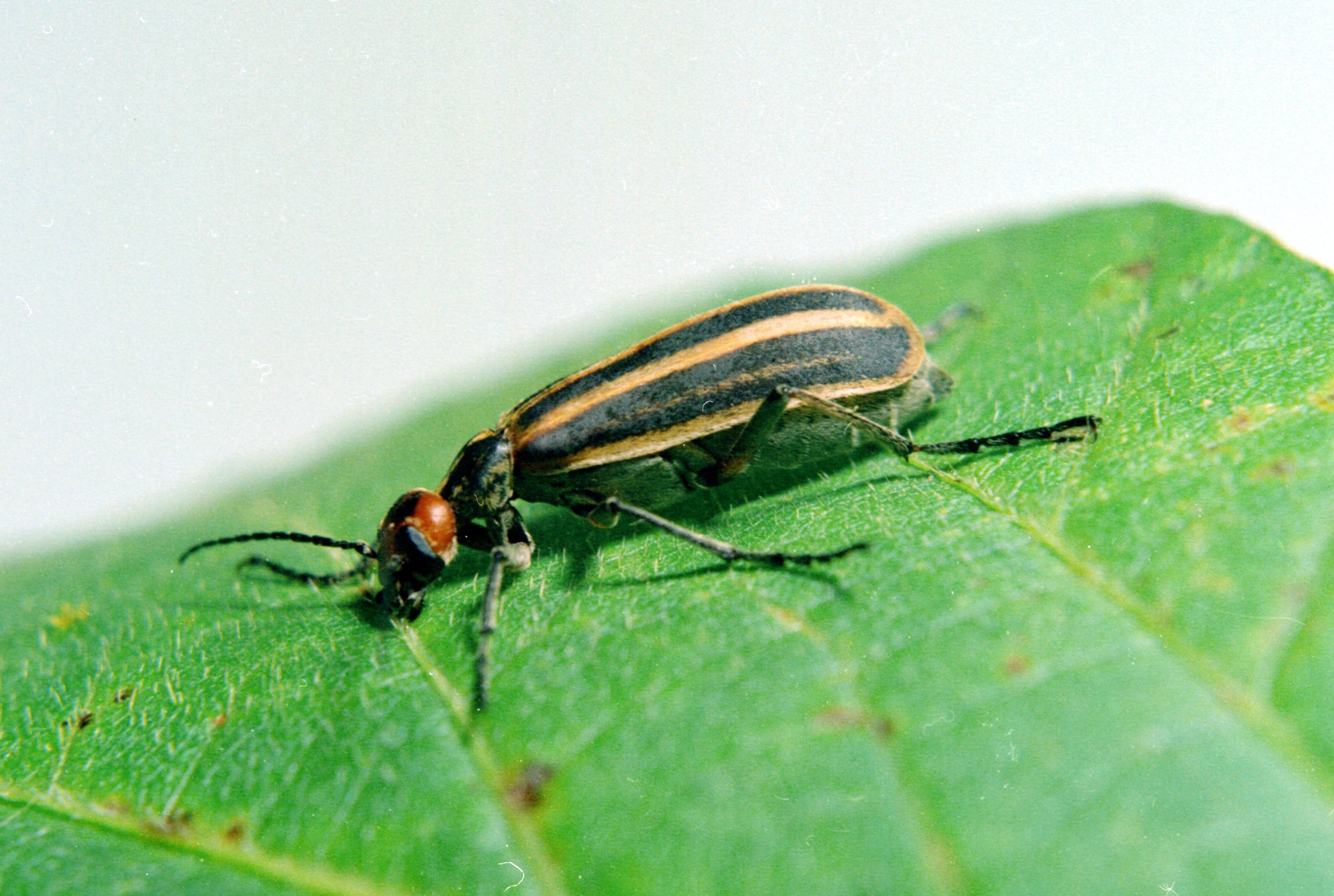

Scientific classification
- Kingdom: Animalia
- Phylum: Arthropoda
- Clade: Pancrustacea
- Class: Insecta
- Order: Coleoptera
- Suborder: Polyphaga
- Infraorder: Cucujiformia
- Family: Meloidae
- Genus: Epicauta
- Species: E. vittata

Binomial name
- Epicauta vittata Fabricius, 1775

= Epicauta vittata =

Species of beetle

Epicauta vittata is a species of beetle in the family Meloidae, the blister beetles. It is native to eastern North America, including eastern Canada and the eastern United States. It is known commonly as the striped blister beetle and the old-fashioned potato beetle. It is known as an agricultural pest.

== Description ==
The adult beetle is 9 to 17 millimeters long. It is long and slender, with a hairy, punctate body. The thorax is narrower than the head and abdomen. It is black and yellow, its color pattern varying across its geographical range. It has two black spots on the head, two black stripes on the thorax, and two or three black stripes on each elytron. Beetles from northern populations have two elytral stripes, and southern beetles have three.

The larva, which is a triungulin, changes in appearance as it develops. The new larva is whitish and has long legs that allow it to be mobile. During this more mobile stage, it parasitizes a grasshopper egg case. From there, it becomes a sedentary grub. When it becomes a sedentary grub it darkens to a reddish-brown color with darker bands, and the legs shrink.

== Life cycle ==
Many blister beetles have a complex developmental cycle in which the larva and pupa experience drastic changes in morphology between growth phases.

There are one or two generations per year, with peak abundance of adults in the summer, or slightly earlier in more hospitable climate types. The adult female produces eggs about every 10 days. It deposits them in masses of 100 to 200 in a tubular chamber a few centimeters deep in the soil, then covers them. The eggs are whitish and about 2 millimeters long. They hatch within 16 days. The functional legs of the new larva allow it to seek its food, the egg of a grasshopper. As it feeds and develops at its food source, its legs become reduced. The striped blister beetle is associated with grasshopper species that produce large egg-pods, such as the two-striped grasshopper (Melanoplus bivittatus) and differential grasshopper (Melanoplus differentialis).

== Impacts ==
The adult beetle is most active during the morning and late afternoon hours, when it feeds on plants. During the heat of mid-day it seeks shelter, and in hot, dry climates it may only be active in the evening. Its preferred host plants are anything solanaceous, and other plants including amaranths (genus Amaranthus). It also feeds on a variety of crop plants, including beans, beet, carrot, cabbages, corn, eggplant, pea, potato, radish, spinach, squash, sweet potato, tomato, turnip, clovers, soybean, and alfalfa.

It is considered to be one of the most problematic of the pest blister beetles in its range. It feeds voraciously, prefers crop plants, damages fruits, and forms swarms that travel en masse. It may be a vector of the bean pod mottle virus, a plant pathogen.

Worse than its damage to plants is its toxicity. Like other blister beetles, it contains cantharidin, a toxic terpenoid. This compound is a vesicant that causes the blistering of skin and mucous membranes. It is injurious to livestock that consume beetles living in hay, and has been known to cause fatalities, particularly of horses. Cantharidin toxicity in an animal may be called cantharidiasis. The cantharidin content of one striped blister beetle has been reported to be about 0.31 to 1.45 milligrams in one small sample, and about 4 or 5 milligrams in general. The toxic dose of cantharidin in horses is about one milligram per kilogram body weight, and the ingestion of 30 to 50 beetles can be fatal. Even two to five beetles can cause horse colic, and hay containing the remnants or fluids of crushed beetles can cause symptoms when eaten. Signs of toxicity include blisters and ulcers of the mouth, pawing, stretching, diarrhea containing bits of intestinal mucosa, hypocalcaemia, and hypomagnesemia. Cattle and sheep appear to be less susceptible but can suffer some symptoms from beetle ingestion.

== Ecology ==
Predators of the striped blister beetle include robber flies and several birds, such as the western meadowlark, eastern bluebird, and scissor-tailed flycatcher. Its eggs are attacked by another blister beetle, Epicauta atrata.

Frogs are apparently not affected by Meloidae beetle toxin, and "consume meloids with impunity". After eating blister beetles, frogs retain the toxin in their tissues and secrete it in their mucus for a short time, and predators that consume the frogs can be poisoned. This includes humans who consume foods such as frog legs. Northern leopard frogs fed striped blister beetles in studies accumulated cantharidin in their thigh muscles, among other tissues. It is estimated that as little as 200 grams of frog legs from beetle-fed frogs could contain a potentially fatal dose of toxin.
