= North Fork of Roanoke AVA =

American Viticultural Area in Virginia

Coordinates: 37°18′50″N 80°16′46″W

North Fork of Roanoke
- Wine region
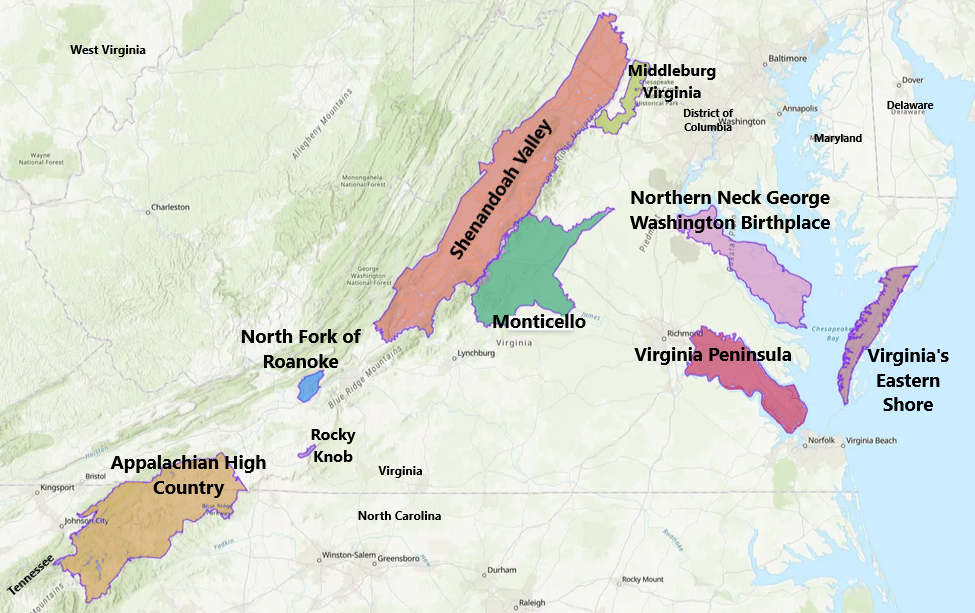
- Type: American Viticultural Area
- Year established: 1983
- Years of wine industry: 266
- Country: United States
- Part of: Virginia
- Other regions in Virginia: Appalachian High Country AVA, Middleburg Virginia AVA, Monticello AVA, Northern Neck George Washington Birthplace AVA, Rocky Knob AVA, Shenandoah Valley AVA, Virginia's Eastern Shore AVA, Virginia Peninsula AVA
- Climate region: Region II
- Heat units: 2800 GDD
- Precipitation (annual average): 39.5 inches (1,003.3 mm)
- Soil conditions: Frederick and Poplimento soils with limestone characteristics
- Total area: 1,200 acres (1.9 sq mi)
- Size of planted vineyards: 49 acres (20 ha)
- No. of vineyards: 5
- Grapes produced: Alicante Bouschet, Cabernet Franc, Cabernet Sauvignon, Chardonnay, Merlot, Norton, Riesling, Sangiovese, Syrah, Traminette, Vidal Blanc, Viognier
- No. of wineries: 2

North Fork of Roanoke is an American Viticultural Area (AVA) located on the eastern slopes of the Allegheny Mountains in Roanoke and Montgomery counties of Virginia just west of the city of Roanoke. It was established as the nation's 31^{st} and the state's third appellation on April 15, 1983 by the Bureau of Alcohol, Tobacco and Firearms (ATF), Treasury after reviewing the petition submitted in October 1981 by Karl and Myra Hereford of MJC Vineyard in Blacksburg, Virginia, proposing the viticulture area named "North Fork of Roanoke."
The North Fork valley stretches 22 miles (35 km) along the Roanoke River with surrounding hillsides where vineyards reside between 1,200 to 2,200 feet (366–671 m) above sea level. The approximately 1,200 acres (1.9 sq mi) area is named for its position on the North Fork river, before it converges with the South Fork to form the Roanoke River. Many of North Fork's 49 acres (20 ha) of vineyards are located on the Allegheny slopes which are part of the larger Blue Ridge mountain range that stretches south into North Carolina. The North Fork AVA weather is characterized by cool, foggy summer mornings and prevailing westerly winds.

== History ==
The name of the area, North Fork of the Roanoke, is taken from the river which runs through the viticultural area. The petitioners submitted evidence to show the name has its origin back to the early settlers and that the name North Fork of Roanoke is established today as a recreation area. The petitioner and other commenters requested the name be shortened to North Fork of Roanoke. Indigenous tribes and early European settlers harvested the native fox grapes from the local frontier. In 1760, proposals were made to the General Assembly for the encouragement of this useful undertaking. An Act was passed to "stimulate the cultivation of the vineyard proposing that £500 be given as a premium to any persons producing the best wine in a quantity no less than 10 hogshead." Wine production was nationally acknowledged as early in the 1840 national census. By 1889, the area's principal wine grapes were Concord, Virginia Norton and Martha. Grape production increased in the locale until 1925 at which time there was a major reduction in vine and wine production throughout Virginia. However, grape hybridization and experimentation continued at Virginia Tech's horticultural farm on the North Fork throughout the 1920s right up to present times. Numerous crosses were made and five varieties released from 1949 through 1969. Today, Virginia Tech operates its experimental vineyard in the Valley of the North Fork, including varietals trials of advanced breeding lines from other states. Other vineyards are emerging on the North Fork, with wine producing cultivars of vitis vinifera and European hybrids replacing American varieties.

== Terroir ==
The viticultural area is well defined geographically because the North Fork of the Roanoke River flows southwesterly half for its length, then reverses its direction around Pearis Mountain and flows northeasterly an additional 10 miles (16 km) to form the main body of the Roanoke River. The viticultural area is bounded on the west by the Alleghany Mountain ridges of the Eastern Continental Divide, on the south by the Pedler Hills, and on the north and east by the Pearis and Fort Lewis Mountains. Vineyards range from 1,200 to 2,200 feet (370–670 m) above sea level where cooler temperatures and diurnal shifts contribute to the grapes acidity and complex flavors.

=== Topography ===
The valley floor of the North Fork begins in Roanoke County at an elevation of 1,800 feet (550 m). As the river flows through Montgomery County it descends 600 feet (180 m) before reentering Roanoke County to form the main body of the Roanoke River. Both the Pearis and Fort Lewis Mountains overlook the North Fork which has elevations of 3,100 feet (940 m). The significant result, viticulturally, is an uneven frost-free area between 1,700 to 2,200 feet (520 to 670 m) elevations on the southeast facing slopes of the Eastern Continental Divide and lower fringe of the north facing slopes of Pearis Mountain.

=== Climate ===
The micro climate for grape production in the viticultural area is excellent due largely to the protection the valley derives from its location between two high ranging, parallel and northwest facing mountain ridges. The mountains protect the valley and its southeast facing slopes from destructive storms and limit excessive rainfall in the growing season. The average annual rainfall in the viticultural area is 39.5 inches (1,003.3 mm) as contrasted with 44.0 inches (1,117.6 mm) and more in the western mountains. Air and soil drainage on the slopes are good. Westerly breezes that flow though the valley provide a refreshing influence in the growing season and also help to dry the canopy in the summer, reducing the risk of fungal vine diseases. Morning fog in the summer helps to moderate the effects of warm sunshine as well, resulting in a balance of phenols and acidity in the finished wines. Despite variations in elevation, the growing season in the North Fork is relatively constant averaging 170 days with a heat summation of about 2800 degree days (GDD) between the 28 °F (−2 °C) Spring and Fall frosts. Winters are mild with temperatures below −5 °F (−21 °C) occurring only every 12 to 15 years with a 150-year record low of −16 °F (−27 °C) in 1977. Summer highs rarely exceed 90 °F (32 °C) and the pattern of warm days and cool nights is conducive to wine grape quality. The USDA plant hardiness zones are 7a and 7b.

=== Soil ===
The viticultural productive slopes are principally made up of Frederick and Poplimento soils with limestone characteristics of the southeast facing slopes and limestone/sandstone layers characteristic of the north facing slopes In the hillside vineyards, excellent drainage negates the effects of the moderate rainfall. The granitic soils in the area are typical of their mountainous origins and are made up of gravel and loam.

== Viticulture ==
North Fork of Roanoke wines gained recognition for their flavor and complexity from fruit grown in the foothills of the Blue Ridge Mountains. The viticultural area's terroir and dedication of its vintners paved a path for developments in Virginia wine. White grape varieties like Riesling, Chardonnay, and Viognier are noted to have a 'bright acidity, intense aromatics, and a refreshing minerality.' Several wineries are experimenting with hybrid grapes like Vidal Blanc and Traminette, producing results that showcases the region's versatility. North Fork of Roanoke is also home to a handful of winemakers dedicated to producing handcrafted wines.
