= Virginia Tech College of Agriculture and Life Sciences =

Agricultural school of Virginia Tech

Coordinates: 37°13′31.8″N 80°25′23.3″W

- Motto: Ut Prosim (Latin)
- Motto in English: That I May Serve
- Type: Public
- Established: 1903
- Affiliations: Virginia Tech
- Dean: Mario G. Ferruzzi
- Students: 3,154
- Undergraduates: 2,729
- Postgraduates: 425
- Location: Blacksburg, Virginia, U.S.
- Total Alumni: More than 21,000
- Colors: Chicago Maroon and Burnt Orange
- Website: www.cals.vt.edu

The College of Agriculture and Life Sciences is one of eight colleges at Virginia Tech with a three-part mission of learning, discovery, and engagement and it is one of the best agriculture programs in the nation. It has more than 3,100 undergraduate and graduate students in a dozen academic departments. In 2013, the National Science Foundation ranked Virginia Tech No. 6 in the country for agricultural research expenditures, much of which originated from the College of Agriculture and Life Sciences.

As part of Virginia Tech's land-grant mission, the college administers Virginia Cooperative Extension in partnership with Virginia State University.

== Departments ==
The college is home to ten academic units:

- Agricultural Technology Program (only associate's degree program at VT)
- Department of Agricultural and Applied Economics
- Department of Agricultural, Leadership, and Community Education
- Department of Biochemistry (formerly shared with the College of Science)
- Department of Biological Systems Engineering (shared with the College of Engineering)
- Department of Entomology (graduate programs only)
- Department of Food Science and Technology
- Department of Human Nutrition, Foods, and Exercise
- School of Animal Sciences
  - Dairy Science
  - Animal and Poultry Sciences
- School of Plant and Environmental Sciences
  - Crop and Soil Environmental Sciences
  - Horticulture
  - Plant Pathology, Physiology, and Weed Science

== History ==
Deans of the CALS
Andrew M. Soule	1903–1906
W.J. Quick	1906–1908
Harvey L. Price	1908–1945
Thomas B. Hutcheson	1946–1950
Leander B. Dietrick	1952–1962
Wilson B. Bell	1962–1968
James E. Martin	1968–1975
James R. Nichols	1975–1991
Andy L. Swiger	1992–2003
Sharron S. Quisenberry	2003–2009
Alan L. Grant	2009–2024
Mario G. Ferruzzi	2024-present

Founded in 1872 as a land-grant college named Virginia Agricultural and Mechanical College, Virginia Tech has evolved into a large public university with numerous degree offerings. The College of Agriculture and Life Sciences provides the kind of education intended under the Morrill Act of 1862, making it the center of the land-grant tradition at Virginia Tech. Closely associated with the college are the Virginia Agricultural Experiment Station, established in 1886, and Virginia Cooperative Extension, established in 1914.

Today, the College of Agriculture and Life Sciences has more than 21,000 alumni.

== Academics ==
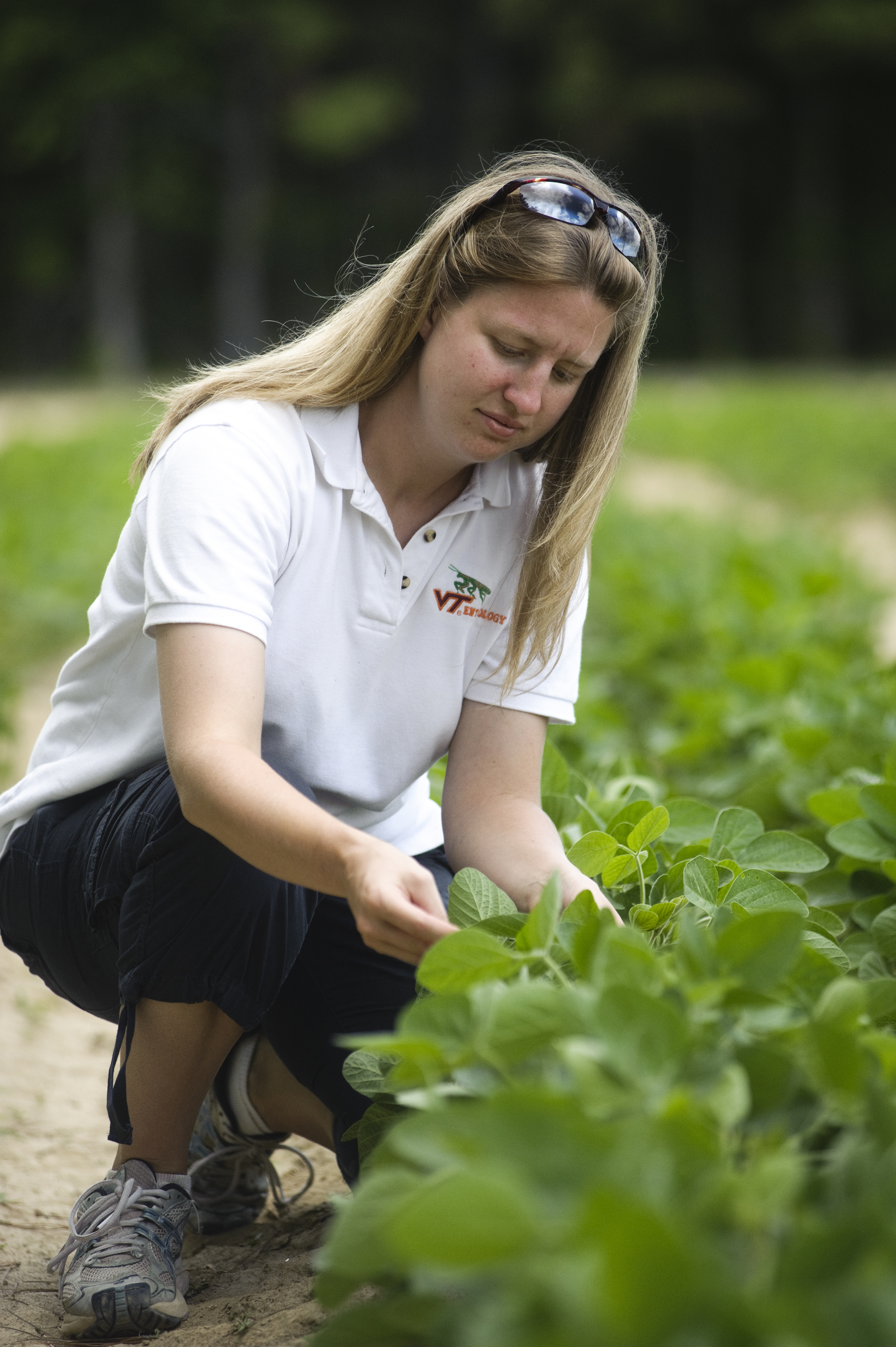
Meredith Cassell, a Ph.D. student in the Department of Entomology at Virginia Tech, collects bean leaf beetles at a soybean field at the Eastern Shore Agricultural Research and Extension Center in Painter, Va. Cassell discovered that beetles carrying bean pod mottle virus, previously unknown to exist in the area, have infected soybean fields throughout the region. (2010)

The college offers bachelor's degrees in 13 majors as well as an undecided option. The Agricultural Technology Program prepares students for careers in the agricultural and green industries with a concentrated, two-year degree experience that leads to an associate degree. Students specialize in either applied agricultural management or landscape and turf management.

== Research ==
The college's Research division has identified six program areas as a focus for development and investment.

Together with the Virginia Tech College of Natural Resources and Environment and the Virginia-Maryland Regional College of Veterinary Medicine, the college administers the Virginia Agricultural Experiment Station, which allows faculty to investigate food and fiber systems, their impact on the environment, and natural and human resource issues. Eleven agricultural research and Extension centers, which are dispersed throughout Virginia's five geographical areas, support this research system.

In 2009, these expenditures exceeded $91.6 million and accounted for more than 23 percent of Virginia Tech's research spending. Through research and Extension efforts, the college helped elevate the state's agricultural exports to record numbers. In 2013, exports in the commonwealth reached $2.85 billion.

== See also ==
- Hahn Horticulture Garden
