= Reach Out and Touch =

Reach Out and Touch may refer to:

- "Reach Out and Touch", 2001 episode of Ally McBeal

== Songs ==
- "Reach Out and Touch (Somebody's Hand)", 1970 solo Motown single by Diana Ross
- Reach Out and Touch, 1982 collegiate album by The New Virginians of Virginia Tech
- "Reach Out and Touch", on the 1985 reggae album A Touch of Class by Sugar Minott
- "Reach Out and Touch", 1989 reggae single by Vitamin X (reggae band)
- "Reach Out and Touch", on the 1994 gospel album Power by Beau Williams
- "Reach Out and Touch", on the 2000 gospel album If That Isn't Love by George Beverly Shea
- "Reach Out and Touch", on the 2008 jazz album Get Up! by Living Waters Jazz
- "Reach Out and Touch", on the 2008 rock/pop album The Singles by Tommy Tutone (a reissue of the song "Reach Out and Touch Her" on the 1995 album Nervous Love)

== See also ==
- "Reach Out and Touch It", song on the 2004 German jazz album The Ground by Tord Gustavsen
- Reach out and touch someone, AT&T advertising jingle coined in 1979 and composed by David Lucas
- Reach Out and Touch Someone, 1980 publication by Carol Lay
- "Reach Out and Touch Someone", 2001 short story by Steven-Elliot Altman
- Reach Out and Touch the Sky, 1981 album by Southside Johnny & The Asbury Jukes
- "Just Reach Out and Touch Me", 1978 single and 1979 country album by Marie Bottrell
