= Khodaparast =

Khodaparast is a surname. Notable people with the name include:

- Giti Khodaparast, American condensed matter physicist
- Hossein Khodaparast (1938–2021), Iranian footballer
