= Hahn Horticulture Garden =

Botanical garden at Virginia Tech University in Blacksburg, Virginia, United States

Coordinates: 37.2194°N 80.4243°W

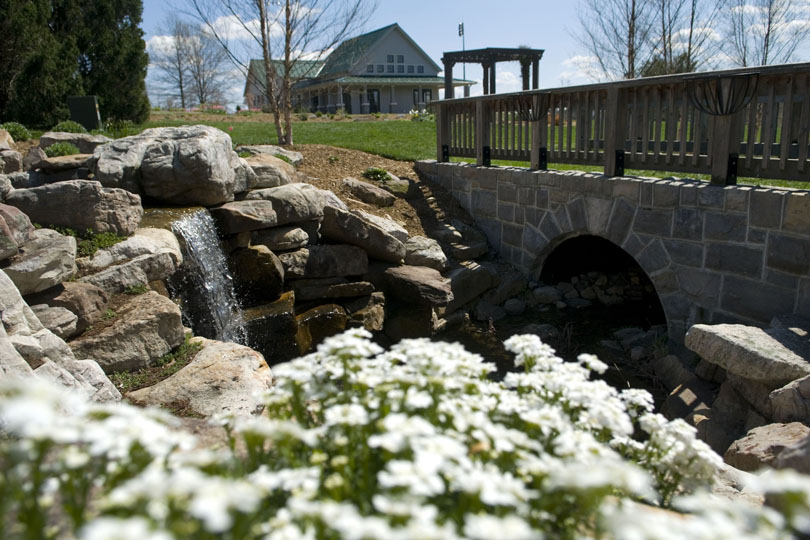
- Spring flowers bloom near a bridge and waterfall. The multi-purpose Peggy Lee Hahn Garden Pavilion sits in the background.
- Interactive map of Hahn Horticulture Garden
- Type: Horticulture garden
- Location: Virginia Tech campus in Blacksburg, Virginia
- Area: 7 acres (2.8 ha)
- Founder: Dr. Robert Lyons, Dr. Richard Johnson and Robert McDuffie
- Website: www.hahngarden.vt.edu

The Peggy Lee Hahn Horticulture Garden (7 acres), formerly the Virginia Tech Horticulture Garden, is a horticulture garden located on the Virginia Tech campus on Washington Street SW, Blacksburg, Virginia, United States. The largest public garden in western Virginia, it is open daily without charge.

The garden was established in 1984 by Dr. Robert Lyons, Dr. Richard Johnson and Robert McDuffie. It was renamed in 2004 to honor Mrs. Hahn and her husband, T. Marshall Hahn, former president of Virginia Tech (1962-1974). All features have been built and planted by students, staff, faculty, and volunteers.

Today the garden is used by students in the horticulture, landscape architecture, urban forestry, and entomology undergraduate programs. More than 50 volunteer gardeners from Blacksburg, Virginia, and the surrounding area assist at the garden throughout the year. Many of them fulfill their requirements with the Virginia Cooperative Extension Master Gardener program at the site.

Garden features include:

- Dwarf Conifer Display
- Perennial Border— More than 90 species and cultivars.
- Pond — Japanese maples with beds of tender annuals.
- Shade Beds — natives and unusual woody plants from Asia and Europe.
- Stream Garden — over 20 species of bog and aquatic plants.
- Trident Maple Allee — Maples underplanted with perennials and annuals.
- Wisteria Arbor — wisteria and climbing hydrangea.
- Xeriscape Area

== Gallery ==
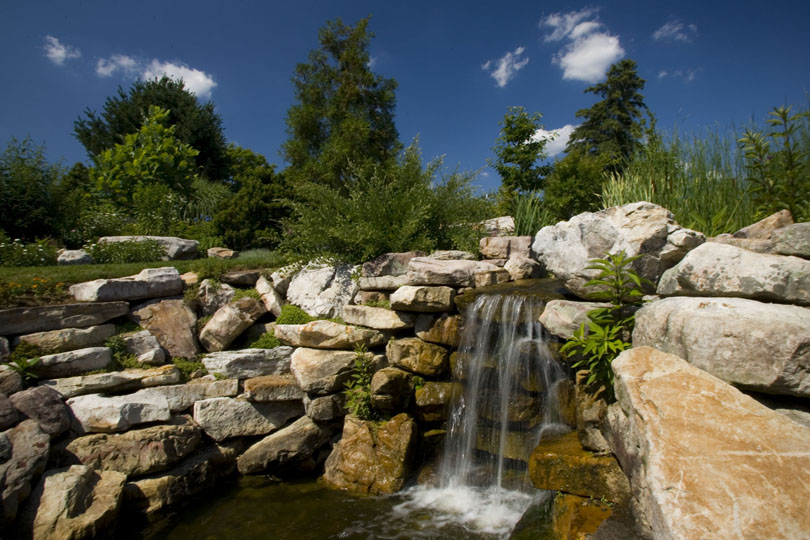
A waterfall empties into a pond at the garden.

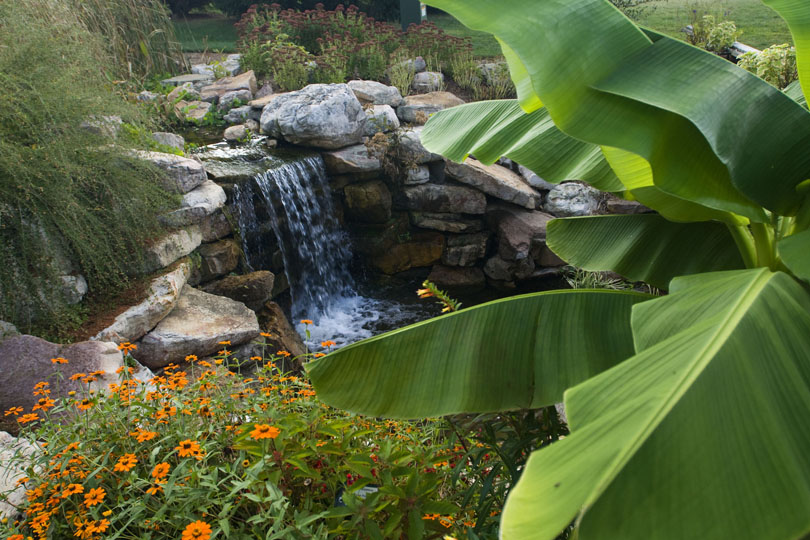
Fall foliage lines the pond.

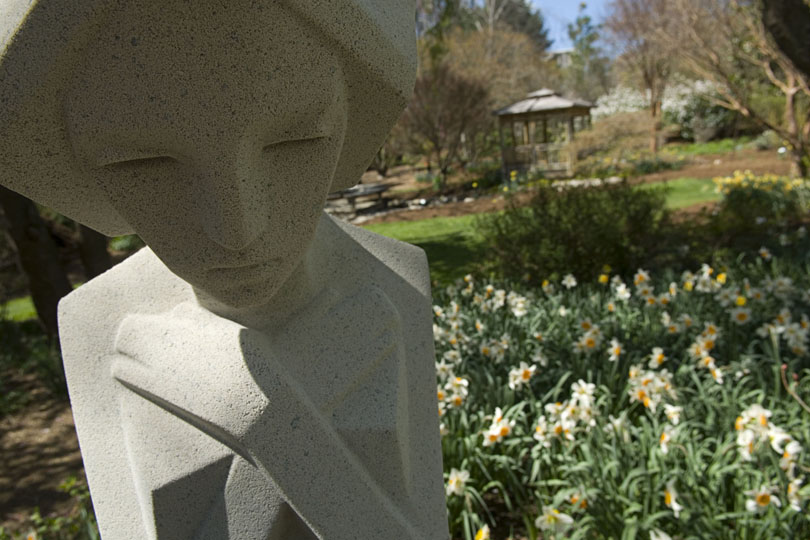
A sculpture by Frank Lloyd Wright greets garden visitors.

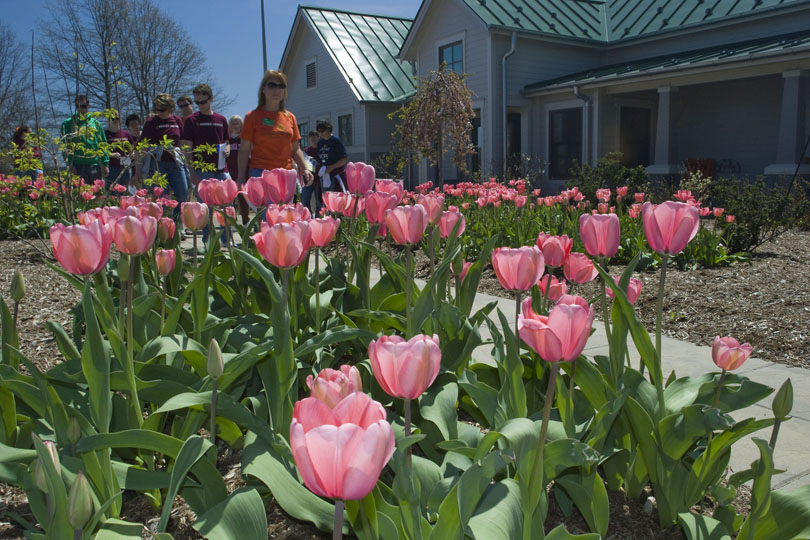
Orange and maroon-clad Virginia Tech students and community members tour the garden and pavilion.

== See also ==
- List of botanical gardens in the United States
- Virginia Tech
- Visit at 200 Garden Ln, Blacksburg, VA 24061
