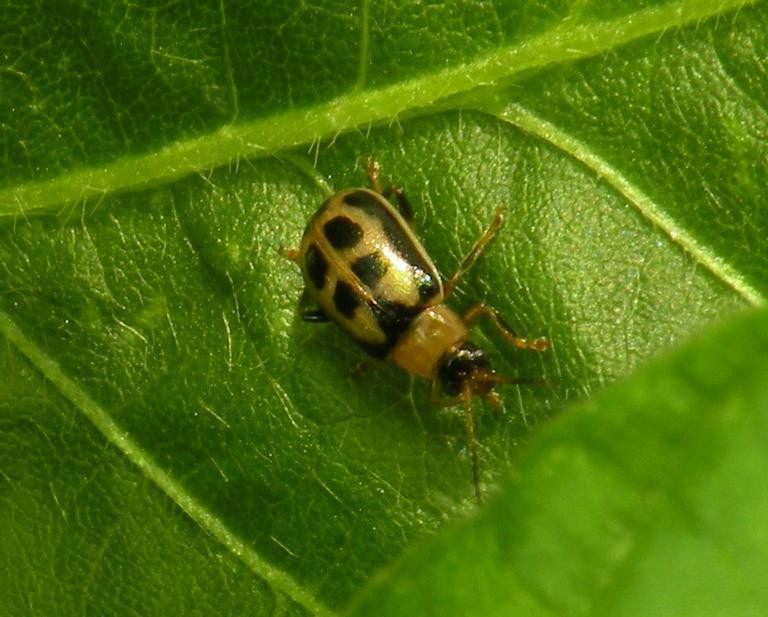

Scientific classification
- Kingdom: Animalia
- Phylum: Arthropoda
- Clade: Pancrustacea
- Class: Insecta
- Order: Coleoptera
- Suborder: Polyphaga
- Infraorder: Cucujiformia
- Family: Chrysomelidae
- Genus: Cerotoma
- Species: C. trifurcata

Binomial name
- Cerotoma trifurcata (Forster, 1771)

Synonyms
- Chrysomela trifurcata Forster, 1771

= Bean leaf beetle =

Species of beetle

Cerotoma trifurcata (also known as the bean leaf beetle) is a species of beetle in the Chrysomelidae family that can be found in the Eastern and West United States.

Previously considered a minor pest, the past 30 years have seen an increase in population abundance. It has spread from its native region of the Mississippi Delta into the American Midwest and Canada. C. trifurcata prefers soybeans as a host, but it has been found on alfalfa, cowpea, snap beans, and cucurbits. It damages crops due to pod damage and being a vector for bean pod mottle virus.

The beetle exhibits overwintering behaviors. Overwintering is associated with mating behavior and regulates when the beetle lays its eggs.

== Description ==
=== Adults ===
Adult beetles are 3.5–5.5 millimeters (0.14–0.22 in) in length, and have a punctuated elytra at their posterior region. Morphs can have colors ranging from light gray to shades of yellow, brown, orange, or red. The elytra has a black triangle in the middle behind the thorax and typically has six additional black spots with a black band around the edges, though non-spotted morphs also occur. The head is always black.

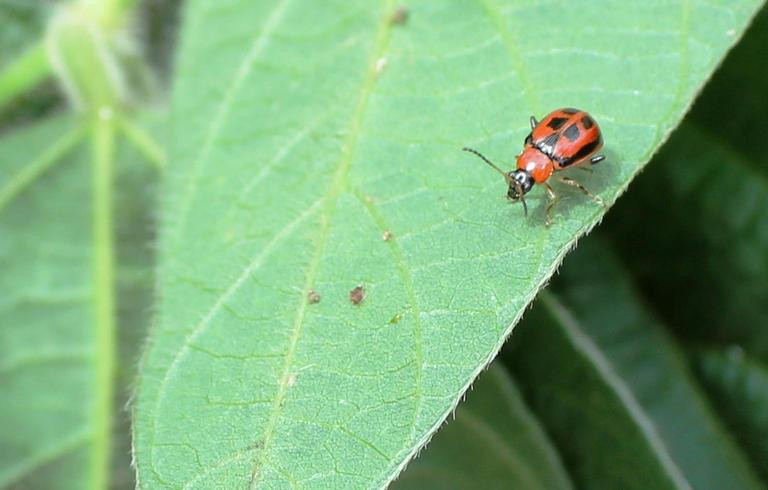
red morph

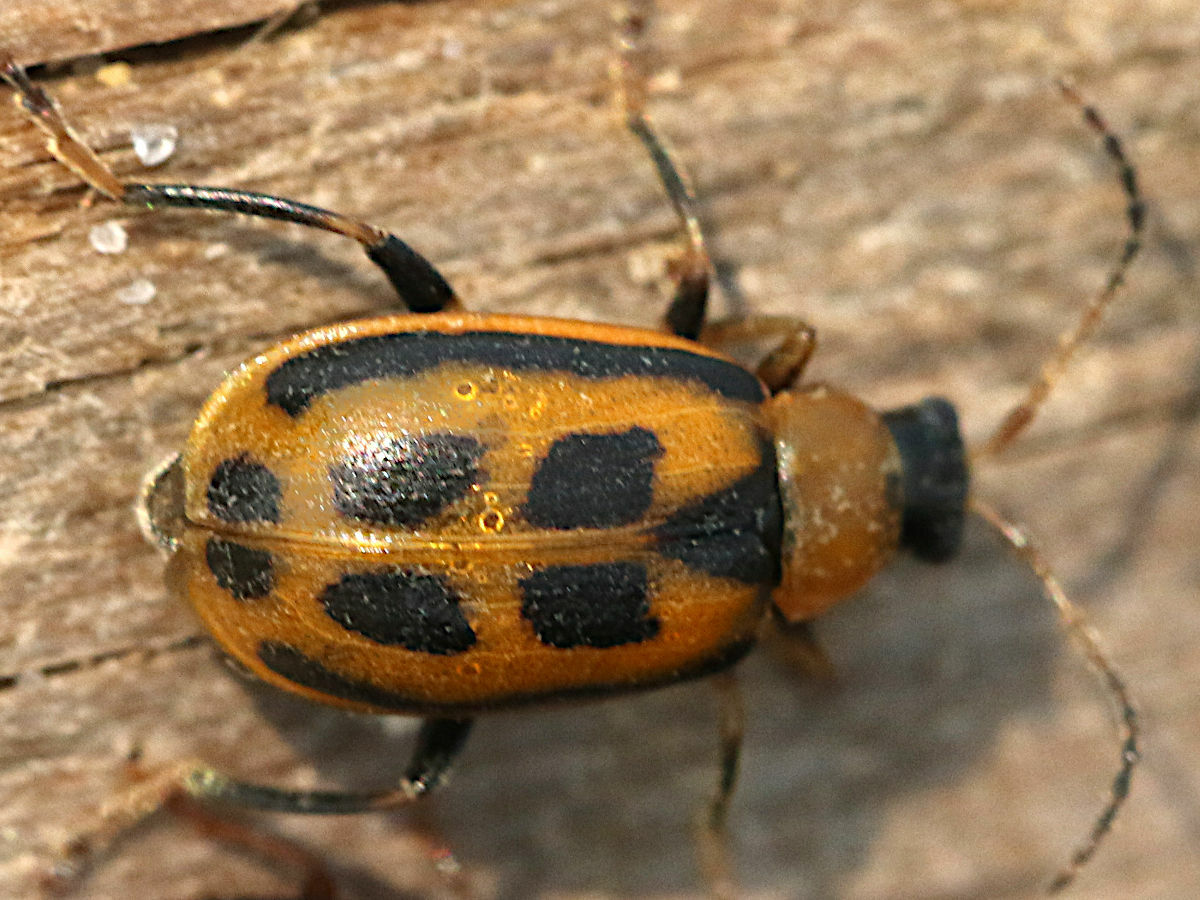
brown morph

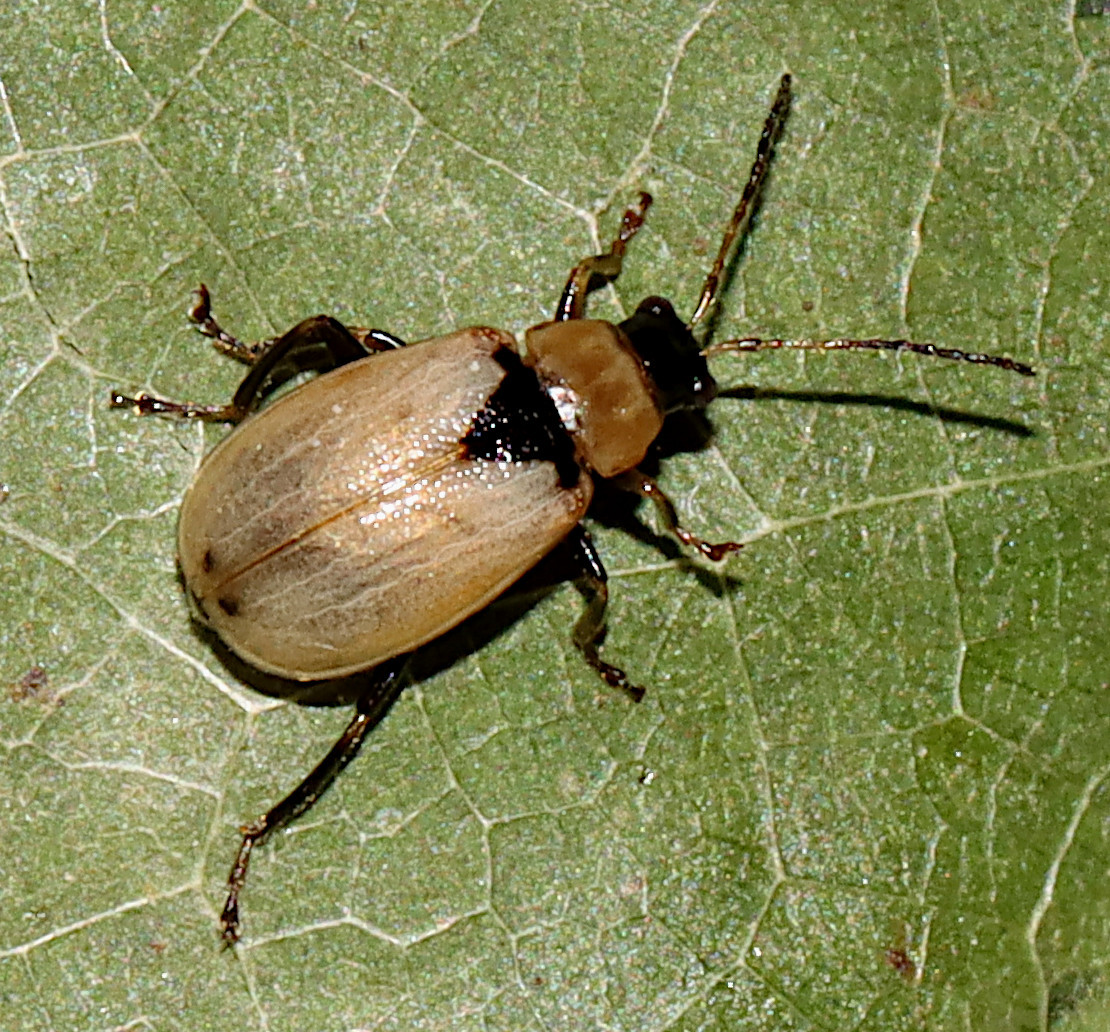
spotless morph

=== Early life ===
Eggs are orange and spindle shaped, and laid in the soil around the base of crops, typically soybeans. Larvae are white and cylindrical, with a dark brown head and a brown sclerite at the base of the abdomen. The larvae live and develop in the soil. C. trifurcata pupae are white and immobile.

== Life history ==
=== Development ===
Adult beetles deposit eggs in the upper two inches of the soil at the base of crops, typically soybean. Eggs hatch in about a week, depending on temperature, and larvae feed on roots and root nodules. These larvae need highly organic soil to survive, and a high clay content prevents larval growth because of the lack of organic material. After approximately three weeks, larvae will pupate in the soil.

=== Emergence ===
Beetle emergence begins in late May and early June, before soybean emergence. A study by Loughran and Ragsdale in Southern Minnesota found widespread consumption of alfalfa by the beetles when they first emerge, and then a migration to soybeans when the seedlings emerge in early June, with almost no beetles remaining on alfalfa by the end of June. Males emerge earlier than females.

Various waves of emergence typically occur depending on region. The first is the emergence of overwintered adults in late May. Ovarian development occurs before overwintered beetles appear on soybeans but after emergence, which suggests the possibility of alfalfa being an important crop in early spring before the emergence of soybean seedlings. These adults mate and lay their eggs 5–6 days after soybean emergence and decline in abundance by mid July. The second emergence of C. trifurcata is that of new adults in mid to late July. The time from egg laying to full adult has been found to vary quite a bit, and can be anywhere from 25–55 days. These first adults mate and lay eggs to produce another generation. First generation adult abundance declines in August. Another generation of adults emerges in late August until mid September. This generation will continue to lay eggs and emerge until the last plants in the fields lose their leaves. The last generation of adults then overwinter, with egg laying rarely occurring. Most regions of the United States have three or four emergences, but colder areas like Canada and Minnesota have been found to have two, and warmer areas near the gulf have five.

== Physiology ==
=== Flight ===
C. trifurcata adults overwinter in leaf litter in forests, and must migrate after emergence to fields for feeding and mating. Future generations of adults in later seasons will migrate back to forests to overwinter. Knowledge of bean leaf beetle flight capacity is important because the beetles are the primary vector for bean pod mottle virus, and pathogen epidemiology is dependent on beetle movement. A majority of beetle flights are short, usually less than 30 minutes and moving less than 50 meters. However, some beetles will make longer, unidirectional flights for more than 30 minutes, moving a kilometer on average. Typically, these flights don’t occur after beetles colonize a satisfactory habitat. This is beneficial in avoiding infestation and disease propagation because it means the beetles don’t often migrate, which would contribute to the spread of feeding and pathogens. It also suggests that spread of bean pod mottle virus is not from migration but from primary inoculation sources and the subsequent spread of viruses by localized beetle populations.

Flight length increases as the season goes on, usually peaking in August. Beetles flying long distances at the end of the season often had more fat content, suggesting that they were traveling to forests for overwintering. Trapping in overwintering habitats can help to control beetle populations at the beginning of the season.

== Food resources ==
A study by Lam and Pedigo (2001) found that bean leaf beetles preferred to feed on soybeans with less trichome density. Trichomes, or surface hairs, are a form of plant defense that interfere with the movement of insects, reducing their access to the leaf epidermis. Most soybean cultivars grown in the United States have simple trichomes. The immature beans have more trichome density, but the density decreases as the beans mature. In this study, these cultivars saw an increase in feeding by C. trifurcata. In contrast, beans that kept their trichome density saw less feeding by the beetle. In addition, less feeding resulted in less inoculation by pathogens such as bean pod mottle virus and fungi. The study suggests that more trichome density could be incorporated into soybean cultivars as a way to decrease damage by C. trifurcata feeding.

== Interactions with humans and livestock ==
=== Crop Damage ===
Typically, crop damage doesn’t occur until late in the season. Larvae feed on soybean roots and root nodules, and early in the season adults will feed on leaves. Neither of these have a considerable economic impact except in unusually heavy infestations. Later in the season, as leaves mature, adult beetles will begin to feed on the outer layer of soybean pods. This leaves only the endocarp, which is a thin tissue layer, over the seed. This leaves the seeds vulnerable to excess moisture and pathogens, causing shrinking, discoloration, and mold.

=== Bean pod mottle virus ===
A major concern with bean leaf beetle infestation is that they’re the primary vector for bean pod mottle virus. This virus causes severe systemic mottling and mild leaf puckering. This can reduce seed size and pod set, which causes a decrease in crop yields. The exact mechanisms of virus spread is currently unknown, but it’s suspected to be specifically due to adult feeding of beetles. Larvae have not been found to transmit the virus. Other beetle species have been identified as vectors, but C. trifurcata is the primary concern because of its ability to spread the virus up to 8 days after acquiring it, a much longer duration than any other beetle.

The virus is rarely spread directly between beetles, and individuals often pick it up by eating infected plants. There are three possibilities for the primary inoculum, or the source of the virus at the beginning of the season. Overwintered beetles and soybean seeds are possible primary inoculum, but transmission from perennial plants is best supported. Other plants from the legume family Fabaceae, particularly Desmodium canadense, have been found to carry bean pod mottle virus. However, all three primary inoculums likely play a role in seasonal transmission, which adds to the difficulty of preventing transmission in crops.

=== Management strategies ===
One of the struggles with C. trifurcata infestation is the lack of consistent biological controls. The beetle has a few natural parasites and predators, but they’ve only been found to control less than 10% of beetle population. Insecticides are the primary management strategies for bean leaf beetle infestation. Foliar insecticides, or insecticides applied directly to leaves as opposed to soil, are typically used. Insecticide strategy is modified when bean pod mottle virus is suspected. In this strategy, two sprays are done of pyrethroid insecticides. The first is done in late May or early June to target overwintered beetles and the second is done in July to target first generation individuals. This prevents primary inoculation of the field with the first spray and mid-season inoculation and virus spread with the second spray.

Delayed planting has also been shown to have positive effects in reducing beetle abundance. This keeps overwintered beetles from their most important food source after emergence. However, results vary in areas with alternative crop sources, particularly alfalfa.

== Climate change ==
C. trifurcata is a prominent example for the global spread of pests towards the poles as climate change causes winters to become milder and growing seasons to increase in length. It has spread from its native region of the Mississippi Delta into the American Midwest and Southern Ontario. Bean leaf beetle abundance increased with the increase of soybean production in the 20th century, but their spread northward was prevented by the inhospitality of northern climates.

The availability of soybean is the primary constraint for the beetles, so the beetles can’t live in an area that doesn’t have soybeans. As the climate of the Mississippi Delta region gets warmer, it will become less hospitable for soybean and therefore for the bean leaf beetle. Some models even predict difficulty growing soybean in more southern areas of the American Midwest, also decreasing beetle abundance. In contrast, Northern Ontario, Manitoba, and the other Prairie provinces are increasing their soybean production as response to improving climate for soybean growth. As the climate continues to get warmer, beetle infestation will likely move northward into these parts of Canada.
