= Cerotoma atrofasciata =

Scientific classification
- Kingdom: Animalia
- Phylum: Arthropoda
- Clade: Pancrustacea
- Class: Insecta
- Order: Coleoptera
- Suborder: Polyphaga
- Infraorder: Cucujiformia
- Family: Chrysomelidae
- Genus: Cerotoma
- Species: C. atrofasciata

Binomial name
- Cerotoma atrofasciata Jacoby, 1879

Species of beetle

Cerotoma atrofasciata is a species of leaf beetle in the family Chrysomelidae. It is found in Central America and North America.
