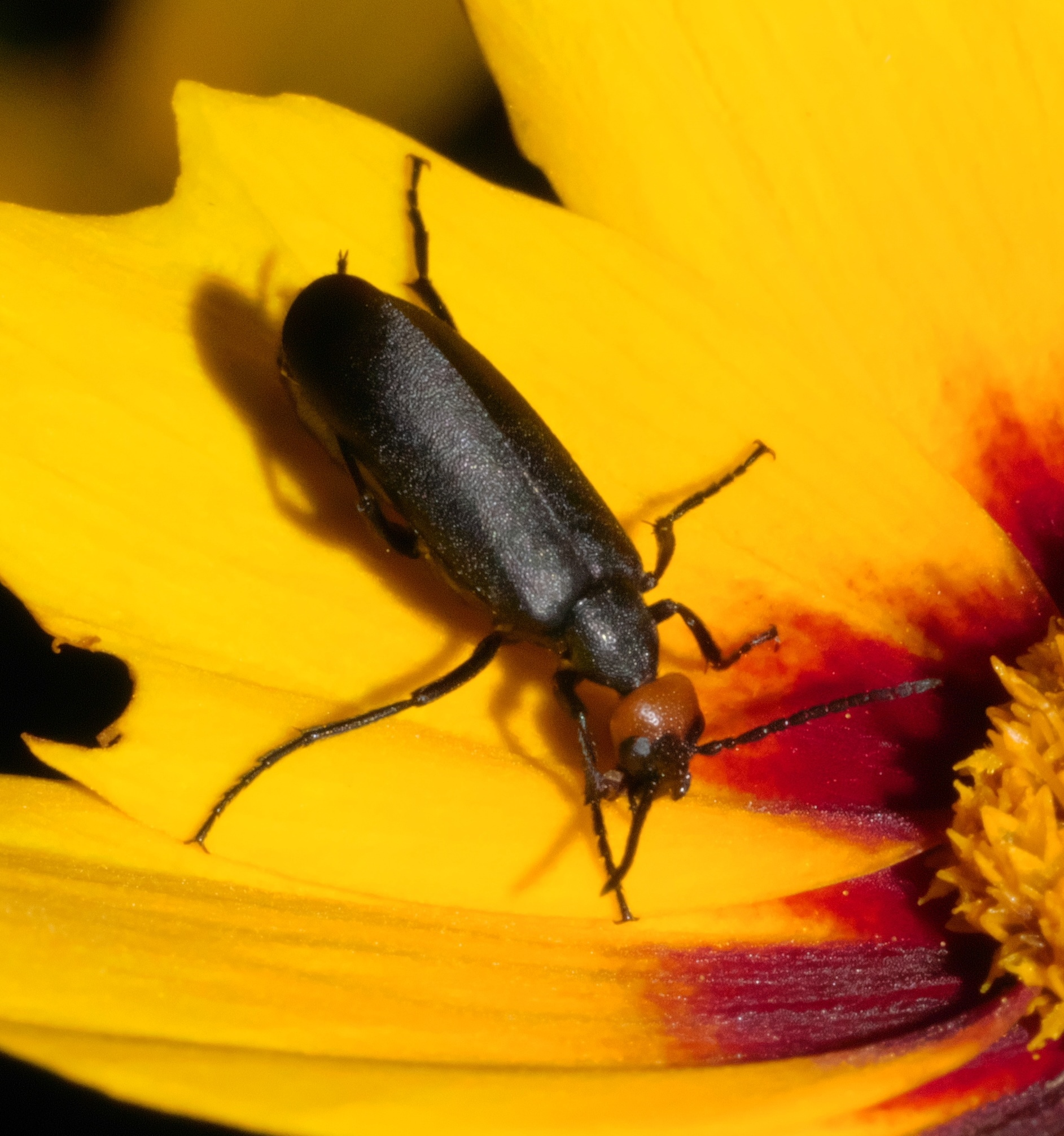
- Epicauta atrata, Oklahoma

Scientific classification
- Kingdom: Animalia
- Phylum: Arthropoda
- Clade: Pancrustacea
- Class: Insecta
- Order: Coleoptera
- Suborder: Polyphaga
- Infraorder: Cucujiformia
- Family: Meloidae
- Subfamily: Meloinae
- Tribe: Epicautini
- Genus: Epicauta
- Species: E. atrata

Binomial name
- Epicauta atrata (Fabricius, 1775)

Synonyms
- Lytta atrata Fabricius, 1775

= Epicauta atrata =

Species of beetle

Epicauta atrata, the red-headed blister beetle, is a species of blister beetle in the family Meloidae. It is found in Central America and North America.

This species is generally characterized by a red head, and an all black body. They attack the eggs of Epicauta vittata, a crop pest found in the East Coast.
