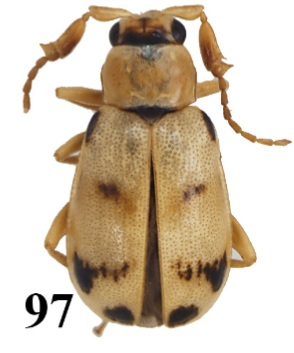

Scientific classification
- Kingdom: Animalia
- Phylum: Arthropoda
- Clade: Pancrustacea
- Class: Insecta
- Order: Coleoptera
- Suborder: Polyphaga
- Infraorder: Cucujiformia
- Family: Chrysomelidae
- Genus: Cerotoma
- Species: C. arcuata

Binomial name
- Cerotoma arcuata (Olivier, 1791)

Synonyms
- Crioceris arcuata Olivier, 1791

= Cerotoma arcuata =

Species of beetle

Cerotoma arcuata is a species of beetle of the family Chrysomelidae. It is found in South America.
