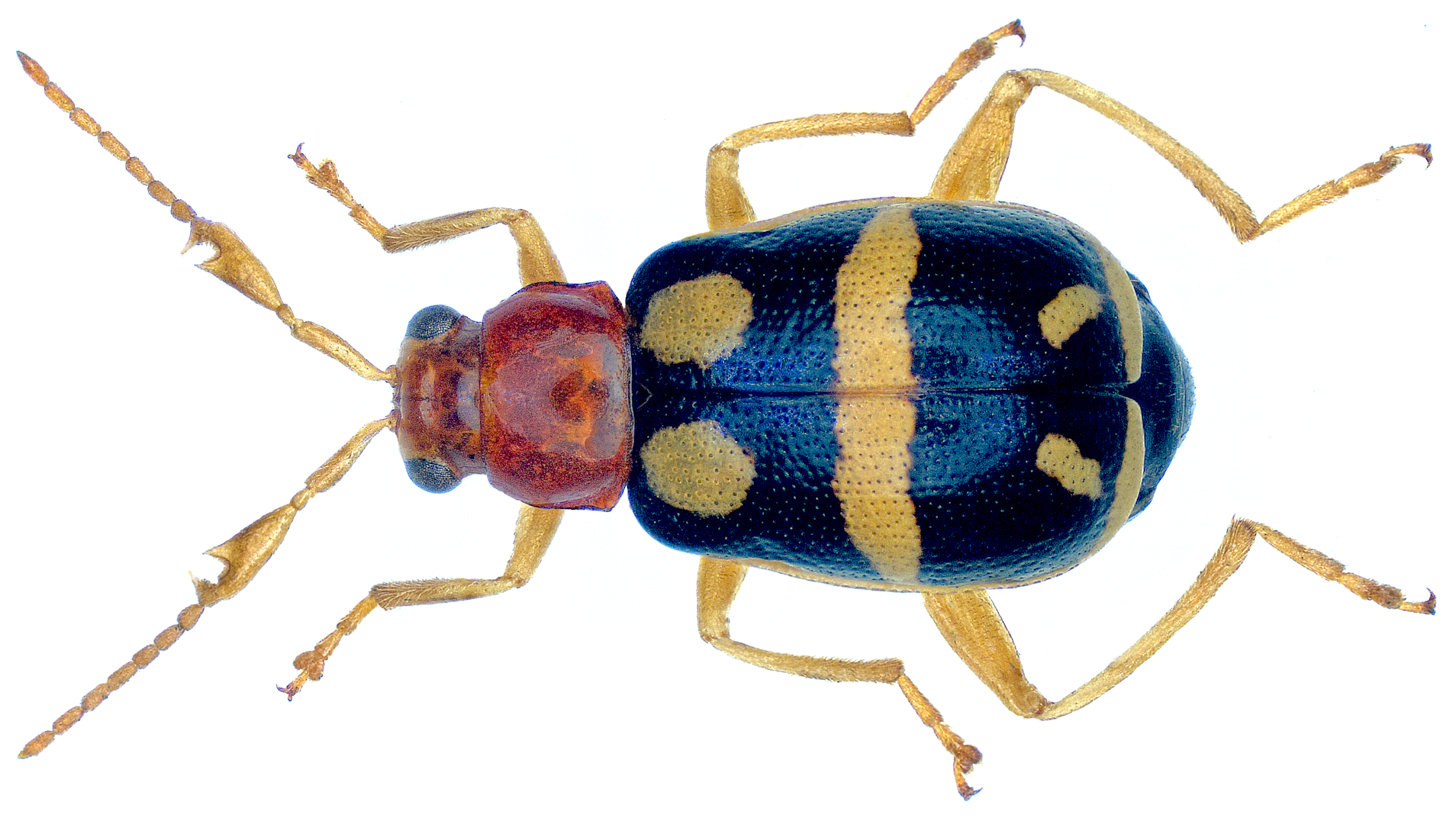
- Male cerotoma ruficornis (2025)

Scientific classification
- Kingdom: Animalia
- Phylum: Arthropoda
- Clade: Pancrustacea
- Class: Insecta
- Order: Coleoptera
- Suborder: Polyphaga
- Infraorder: Cucujiformia
- Family: Chrysomelidae
- Genus: Cerotoma
- Species: C. ruficornis

Binomial name
- Cerotoma ruficornis (Olivier, 1791)

= Cerotoma ruficornis =

Species of beetle

Cerotoma ruficornis is a species of leaf beetle in the family Chrysomelidae. It is found in the Caribbean Sea, Central America, and North America.

== Subspecies ==
These two subspecies belong to the species Cerotoma ruficornis:

- Cerotoma ruficornis ruficornis (Olivier, 1791)
- Cerotoma ruficornis sexpunctata (Horn, 1872)
