= Giti Khodaparast =

American condensed matter physicist

Giti Adham Khodaparast is an American condensed matter physicist and professor at the Virginia Tech College of Science. She was elected a Optica Fellow in 2024, and a Fellow of SPIE in 2025. Khodaparast earned a Ph.D. from the University of Oklahoma in 2001. Her dissertation was titled, Magneto-Optical Properties of Indium Antimide Based Quantum Wells. Ryan E. Doezema and Michael Santos were her doctoral advisors. From 2001 to 2004, she was a postdoctoral researcher in the department of electrical and computer engineering at Rice University.
