= T. Marshall Hahn =

American educator (1926–2016)

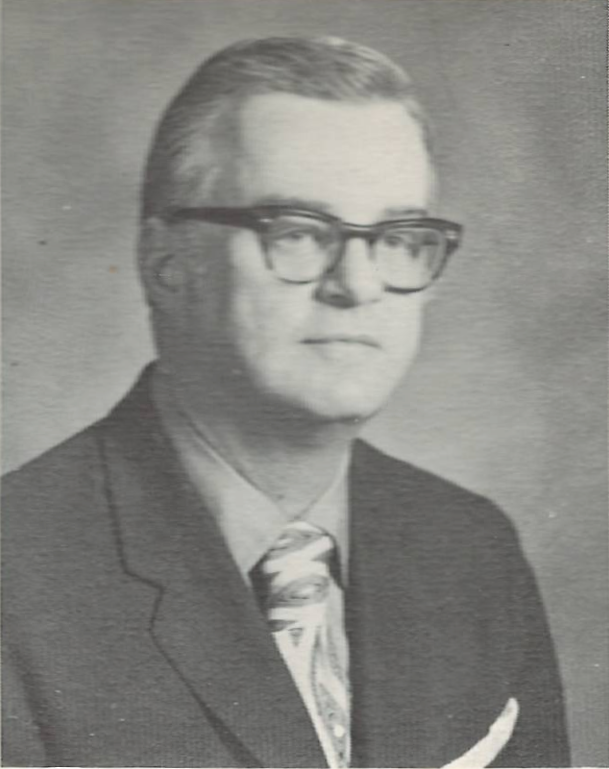
- Hahn, c. 1972

11th President of Virginia Polytechnic Institute and State University
- In office July 1, 1962 – December 31, 1974
- Preceded by: Walter S. Newman
- Succeeded by: William E. Lavery

Personal details
- Born: Thomas Marshall Hahn Jr. December 2, 1926 Lexington, Kentucky, U.S.
- Died: May 29, 2016 (aged 89) Blacksburg, Virginia, U.S.
- Education: University of Kentucky; Massachusetts Institute of Technology

Thomas Marshall Hahn Jr. (December 2, 1926 – May 29, 2016) was an American educator. He served as President of Virginia Polytechnic Institute and State University from 1962 to 1974 and CEO of Georgia-Pacific Corporation from 1983 to 1993.

== Early life and education ==
Born in Lexington, Kentucky, Hahn was educated in its public schools before going to the University of Kentucky, where he graduated "with highest honors," receiving a B.S. degree in physics in 1945 at the age of 18. After graduation he served in the U.S. Navy and was a physicist for U.S. Naval Ordnance Laboratory. After his navy service, he went to the Massachusetts Institute of Technology, where he earned a Ph.D. in physics in 1949.

== Career ==
Hahn was a research assistant at Massachusetts Institute of Technology, beginning in 1947. In 1949, he returned to the University of Kentucky as associate professor and then professor of physics. In 1954, Hahn joined the faculty of Virginia Polytechnic Institute in Blacksburg, Virginia, as head of the Department of Physics. He was the leading force in establishing a doctoral program in nuclear engineering physics at VPI, and in the acquisition of the nuclear reactor simulator that was put into operation in 1957. From 1959 to 1962, he served as Dean of the College of Arts and Sciences at Kansas State University.

Hahn returned to Virginia Tech as President on July 1, 1962, where he remained until 1975. He was instrumental in Virginia Tech's transition from a small, primarily military, and overwhelmingly white and male technical institute focused on agriculture and engineering that emphasized undergraduate teaching over research or graduate program to, symbolized by its new name, Virginia Polytechnic Institute and State University, a coeducational, racially integrated research university with a thriving college of arts and sciences and burgeoning graduate program. In 1964, Hahn dropped the requirement for all male students to participate in the Corps of Cadets and severed ties with Radford University, which had been the Women's Division of VPI since 1944. These changes resulted in the student population tripling in size.

During this period, Blacksburg was affected by the student anti-war protests with Hahn targeted as a symbol of the bureaucracy in 1970 when considerable disturbance erupted on campus after a group of students and two faculty members protesting U.S. involvement in the Vietnam War interrupted a Corps of Cadets drill, forcing the university to seek an injunction against further disruptive activities by the individuals involved. Several weeks later after the Kent State shootings a group of students and non-student anti-war protesters seized Williams Hall. Hahn called in the Virginia State Police who stormed the building to end the standoff. The students involved were expelled. He served until December 31, 1974, and was succeeded as President of Virginia Tech by William Edward Lavery in 1975.

After leaving Virginia Tech, Hahn became an executive with the Georgia-Pacific Corporation. He was with the company starting in 1973 as a director (1973–2016); executive vice president, chemicals (1975); executive vice president, pulp, paper, and chemicals (1975–1976); president (1976–1982); president and chief operating officer (1982–1983); president and chief executive officer (1983–1984); and chairman of the board, president and chief executive officer (1984–1985). Hahn's tenure as CEO of Georgia Pacific from 1983 to 1993 included the boom years for the paper industry and the hostile takeover of Great Northern Nekoosa by Georgia-Pacific. The latter was one of Hahn's strategic decisions to build the paper side of Georgia Pacific's business. Hahn was instrumental in organizing a cross-country tour for the New Virginians, a Virginia Tech musical group. The tour included stops at Georgia Pacific facilities across the country.

Hahn also served as President of Air University (1966–1969) and on the Board of Visitors for Ferrum Junior College (1966–1974). He was a fellow of the American Physical Society and a member of the National Science Board, appointed by the President in 1972. He served as director for the board of control of Southern Regional Education Board; First National-Exchange Bank of Virginia; The Lane Company; Dominion Bankshares, Inc.; Roanoke Electric Steel Corporation, and Shenandoah Life Insurance Company. Hahn has been a member of several additional boards and commissions, including the Virginia State Board of Agriculture and Commerce (member, 1962–1974); Governor of Virginia's Commission on the Status of Women (member, 1964–1966); Metropolitan Areas Study Commission of Virginia (chairman, 1966–1968); Virginia Cancer Crusade (chairman, 1972); Salvation Army National Capitol and Virginia Divisional Advisory Board (chairman, 1972–1974); and Academic Affairs Commission, American Council of Education (member).

After retiring from Georgia-Pacific in 1993, Hahn returned to Montgomery County, Virginia, where he lived on his farm in the Ellett Valley and raised cattle, sheep, and goats. He died after a decade-long battle with Parkinson's disease on May 29, 2016. Hahn is buried in Blacksburg.

== Personal life ==
Hahn married Margaret Louise "Peggy" Lee (1923–2009) on December 27, 1948, and the couple had three children. After her death, he married and later divorced Jean Russell Quible.

== Honors ==
Hahn was named to the Hall of Distinguished Alumni at the University of Kentucky in 1965. He was recognized by eight different Greek honorary fraternities. In 1976, he received the MIT Corporate Leadership Award and an honorary Doctor of Laws degree from Seton Hall University.

Hahn received an honorary doctorate of science from Virginia Tech in 1987. The university named Hahn Hall for Hahn in 1990, and the Peggy Lee Hahn Garden Pavilion and Horticulture Garden are named for his wife Peggy.
