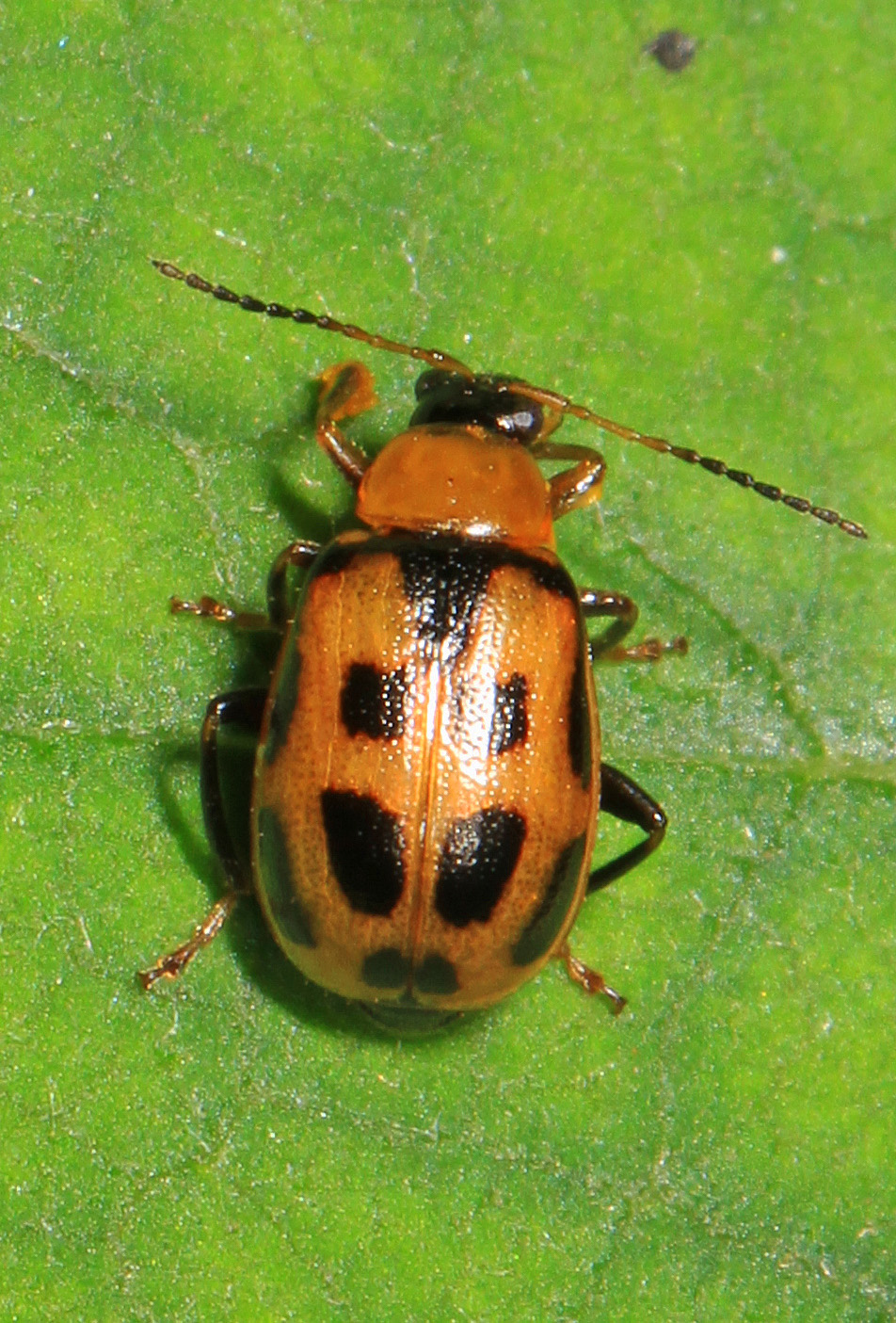
- Bean Leaf Beetle( Cerotoma trifurcata) - Cerotoma trifurcata, Meadowood Farm SRMA, Mason Neck, Virginia.

Scientific classification
- Kingdom: Animalia
- Phylum: Arthropoda
- Clade: Pancrustacea
- Class: Insecta
- Order: Coleoptera
- Suborder: Polyphaga
- Infraorder: Cucujiformia
- Family: Chrysomelidae
- Subtribe: Diabroticina
- Genus: Cerotoma; Chevrolat, 1836

Synonyms
- Andrector Horn, 1872

= Cerotoma =

Genus of beetles

Cerotoma is a genus of leaf beetles in the family Chrysomelidae. There are about seven described species in Cerotoma. They are found in North America and the Neotropics.

== Species ==
These seven species belong to the genus Cerotoma:

- Cerotoma arcuata Olivier, 1791
- Cerotoma atrofasciata Jacoby, 1879
- Cerotoma dilatipes Jacoby, 1888
- Cerotoma rubrimarginata (Lever, 1930)
- Cerotoma ruficornis (Olivier, 1791)
- Cerotoma trifurcata (Forster, 1771) (bean leaf beetle)
- Cerotoma variegata Fabricius, 1792
