= Virginia Tech College of Natural Resources and Environment =

- Motto: Ut Prosim (Latin)
- Motto in English: That I May Serve
- Type: Public University
- Established: 1992
- Parent institution: Virginia Tech
- Dean: Saskia van de Gevel
- Students: 1,023
- Undergraduates: 758
- Postgraduates: 265
- Location: Blacksburg, Virginia, U.S.
- Colors: Chicago maroon and Burnt orange
- Website: www.cnre.vt.edu

The College of Natural Resources and Environment at Virginia Tech contains academic programs in forestry, fisheries, wildlife sciences, geography, and wood science. The college contains four departments as well as a graduate program in the National Capital Region and a leadership institute for undergraduates.

The College of Natural Resources and Environment conducts most of its research in facilities located in Blacksburg or through the National Science Foundation's Industry & University Cooperative Research Program (I/UCRC). In 2014-15, the college consisted of 1,023 students. The current dean of the college, Paul M. Winistorfer, was appointed in 2009.

== History ==
Although the college was not officially established until 1992, its roots were present in Virginia Tech's history as early as 1925 when the first professor of forestry, Wilbur O’Byrne, was hired. By the early 1930s, students were able to study field horticulture, landscape design, and the chemical properties of sprays used to protect orchards. In 1938, the first bachelor of science degrees in conservation and forestry were offered in the Department of Biology.

By 1969, the Department of Forestry and Wildlife had become the fastest-growing department on campus, having grown from 66 undergraduates and five graduate students to 346 undergraduates and 52 graduate students. That same year, the department was officially made a unit of the College of Agriculture, and by 1974, it split into the Department of Forestry and Forest Products and the Department of Fisheries and Wildlife Sciences. By 1975, a School of Forestry and Wildlife Resources was established. This school became an official university college in 1992, named the College of Forestry and Wildlife Resources. In 2000, the college changed its name to the College of Natural Resources before settling on its current title in 2010.

== Academics ==
The College of Natural Resources and Environment contains four departments as well as executive and traditional master's programs in the National Capital Region. As of 2010-11, the college had 737 students taking classes on the Blacksburg campus, thereby making it the smallest at Virginia Tech in terms of enrollment.

=== Department of Fish and Wildlife Conservation ===
The Department of Fish and Wildlife Conservation offers a bachelor of science in fisheries science and a bachelor of science in wildlife science to undergraduate students. It also offers an M.S. and Ph.D. in both fisheries and wildlife sciences to graduate students.

=== Geography ===
Undergraduates can earn a B.A. in geography. The department offers two options for undergraduate geography majors: culture, regions, and international development or geospatial and environmental analysis. In 2012, the department added an undergraduate B.S. degree in meteorology, the only meteorology program offered in Virginia. Graduate students may earn an M.S. in geography. The Department of Geography also participates in the college's doctoral program in geospatial and environmental analysis.

=== Sustainable Biomaterials (formerly Wood Science and Forest Products) ===
Undergraduates can earn a bachelor's degree in wood science and forest products. The department, which has a strong focus on biomaterials, offers students the opportunity to choose one of the following four options: packaging science, forest products business, residential wood structures, or wood materials science. Graduate students can earn an M.S., M.F., or Ph.D. through the department.

=== Forest Resources and Environmental Conservation ===
Undergraduates can earn a B.S. in one of the following majors: forestry, environmental resource management, and natural resources conservation. Within a major, students can choose one of the following options: forest resource management, forest operations and business, urban forestry, environmental resource management, watershed management, conservation and recreation management, environmental education, and natural resource science education. Graduate students can earn an M.S., M.F., or Ph.D. through this department. The department actively participates in the college-wide doctoral program in geospatial and environmental analysis.

=== Master of Natural Resources graduate program ===
The Master of Natural Resources (MNR) graduate program at Virginia Tech offers two flexible formats: the Executive Master of Natural Resources (XMNR) and the Online Master of Natural Resources (OMNR). Administered through the Center for Leadership in Global Sustainability (CLiGS), now headquartered in Cheatham Hall within the College of Natural Resources and Environment in Blacksburg, Virginia, this program is designed for professionals seeking advanced education in sustainability leadership.

With emphases on urban challenges, natural resource policy, and international perspectives, the MNR program prepares students to address complex environmental issues. More than 30 courses are available across traditional, hybrid, and online learning environments, supporting a global, practice-oriented approach to sustainability education.

== College of Natural Resources and Environment leadership institute ==
In 2010, the college established the College of Natural Resources and Environment Leadership Institute for undergraduate students. In this two-semester study sequence, students study leadership styles and work on group projects focused on enhancing leadership qualities. Additionally, students meet with state government, state agencies, and non-governmental organizations in order to experience organizational and political processes in action.

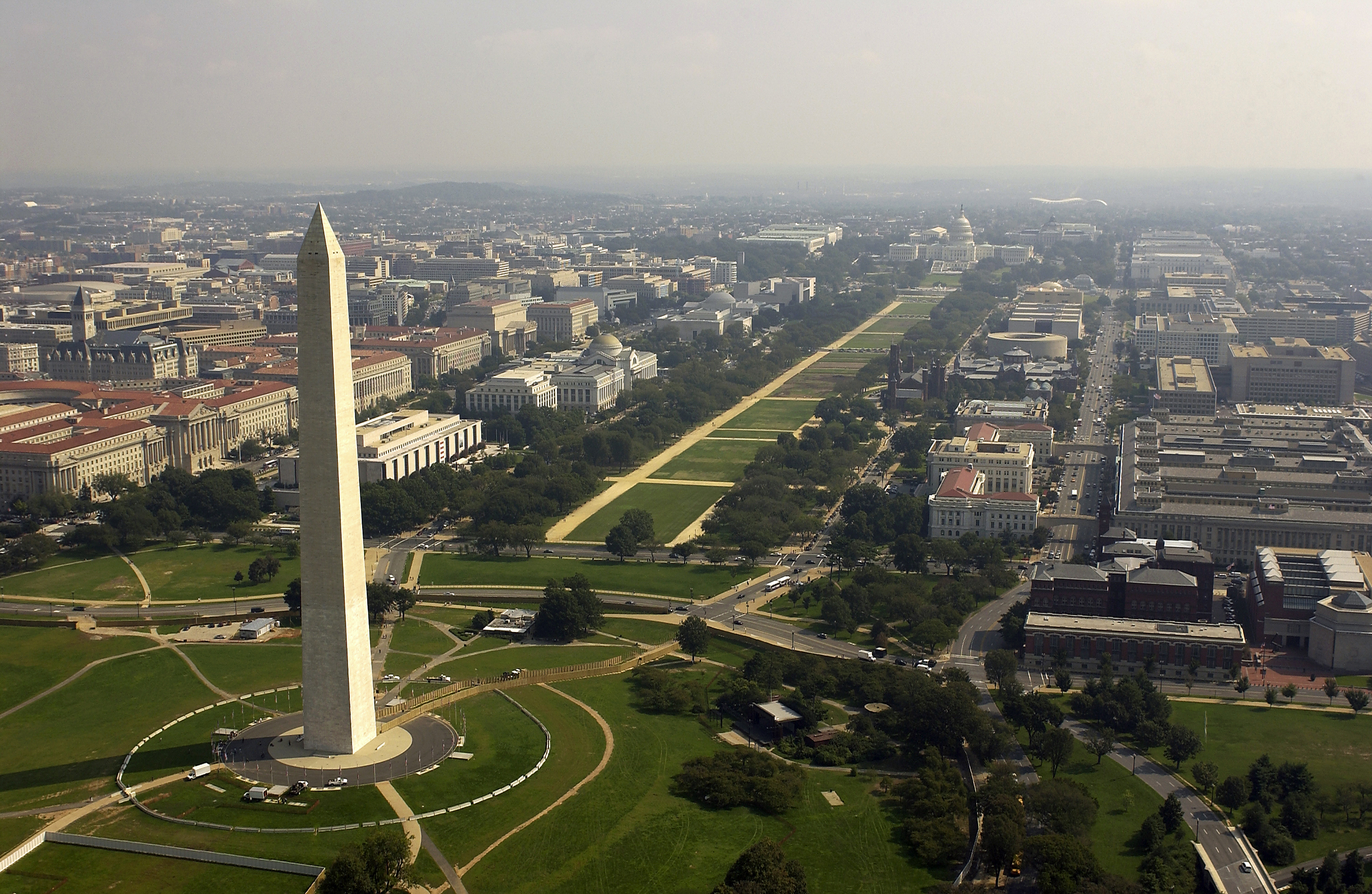
Virginia Tech's National Capital Region offers Natural Resources and Environment programs within the Washington metropolitan area.

== National Capital Region ==
In 1969, the university launched new locations within the Virginia Tech National Capital Region (NCR). These facilities serve as a hub in the Washington metropolitan area for its students and alumni. As of 2015, the NCR offers Graduate programs for the college.

== Research centers and cooperatives ==
On Virginia Tech's main campus, faculty and students from the college conduct most of their research in Cheatham Hall and Latham Hall. These facilities can be used to study the physiology, nutrition, and genetics of trees, fish, and wildlife. Additionally, faculty and students have access to the Thomas M. Brooks Forest Products Center, located in the Corporate Research Center adjacent to the Blacksburg campus. The center contains laboratories for wood-based composites manufacture and testing, a high-bay wood engineering lab with full-scale timber testing equipment, a wood drying laboratory, the William A. Sardo Pallet Laboratory, and the Center for Unit Load Design Laboratory. The Virginia Water Resources Research Center, established by the Commonwealth of Virginia in 1965 "for the purposes of developing, implementing and coordinating water and related land research programs," is also located in Blacksburg.

Beyond Blacksburg, the College of Natural Resources and Environment is also affiliated with research centers that are part of the National Science Foundation's Industry/University Cooperative Research Center program, such as the Wood-Based Composites Center and the Center for Advanced Forestry Systems. In addition, the college has connections to the Virginia Cooperative Fish and Wildlife Research Unit, whose cooperators include the United States Fish and Wildlife Service, the United States Geological Survey, the Virginia Department of Game and Inland Fisheries, and the Wildlife Management Institute.

The college has also been the recipient of research funding from national organizations. In 2011, the National Institute of Food and Agriculture (NIFA) awarded Virginia Tech's Department of Forest Resources and Environmental Conversation $3.4 million for a coordinated agricultural grant to study the effects of climate change on southern pine forests. Additionally, in 2010, researchers from Virginia Tech's College of Natural Resources and Environment received a $3.4 million grant from the United States Department of the Interior to study the effects of the Deepwater Horizon oil spill in the Gulf of Mexico on piping plovers, shorebirds that have been listed as threatened since 1986.

== Rankings ==
According to a 2006 study of the research impact of North American forestry programs published in the Journal of Forestry, the College of Natural Resources and Environment's forestry program was second on the perceptions-based composite score and third on the citations-based and publications-based index. In 2010, the National Research Council also ranked the forestry Ph.D. program as one of the best in the nation. Additionally, during the last accreditation process in 1996, peer institutions ranked the college's wildlife and fisheries programs first and second, respectively.

In addition to its academic programs, the college has also been ranked for its research programs. In 2011, the National Science Foundation ranked the research program in the College of Natural Resources and Environment and the Virginia Tech College of Agriculture and Life Sciences fifth in the nation.

== Notable alumni ==
- Douglas Domenech (forestry and wildlife management 1979) was appointed secretary of natural resources in 2010 by Virginia Governor Bob McDonnell.
