= Mottle =

Pattern of irregular marks on plants or animals

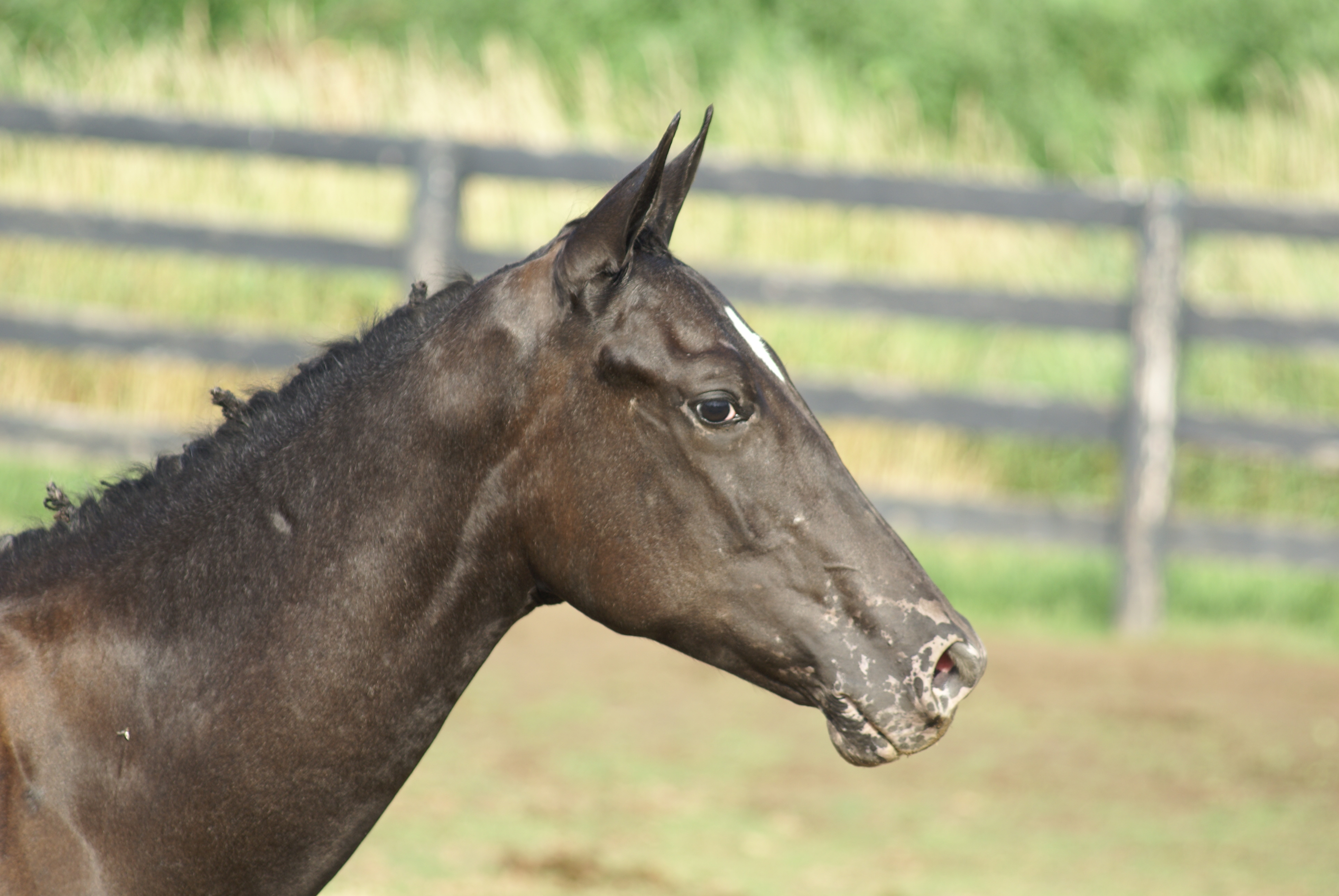
This Appaloosa horse shows mottling around its mouth and nostrils. In this particular case, it is a normal hereditary trait linked to a spotted coat color-pattern and not a sign of disease.

A mottle is a pattern of irregular marks, spots, streaks, blotches or patches of different shades or colours. The term commonly describes the surface of plants or the skin of animals. In plants, mottling usually consists of yellowish spots on plants, and is usually a sign of disease or malnutrition. Many plant viruses cause mottling, including Tobacco vein mottling virus and Bean pod mottle virus.

"Mottling" is sometimes used to describe uneven, discolored patches on the skin of humans as a result of cutaneous ischemia (lowered blood-flow to the surfaces of the skin) or Herpes zoster infections. The medical term for mottled skin is dyschromia. Although not always the case, mottling can occur in a dying patient and commonly indicates that the end of life is near. Mottling usually occurs in the extremities (lower first) and progresses up as cardiac function declines and circulation throughout the body is poor. In animals, mottling may be a sign of disease, but may also be a hereditary trait, as seen with the champagne and leopard complex genes in horses.

"Mottles" can also refer to discoloration in processed food, such as butter.

In geology, "mottled" refers to a patchy/blotch texture of alteration or interbedding, commonly found in limestone and commonly caused by bioturbation.

"Mottling" can also refer to an undesirable defect which can occur with effect coatings, most obvious on light metallic finishes. The total color impression shows irregular areas of lightness variations. These "patches" are usually visually evaluated, described as a mottling effect. Some also feel that it reminds them of clouds. This effect is especially noticeable on large body panels. It can be caused by the coating formulation, as well as by variations in the application process. For example, disorientation of the metallic flakes or film thickness variations of the basecoat can lead to various mottle sizes resulting in a non-uniform appearance. The visual perception of mottling is dependent on the viewing distance: Large mottles can be seen in far-distance evaluation, while small mottles are more noticeable in close-up evaluation. The visual evaluation of mottling is very subjective, and depends on the illumination conditions, the observing distance and the viewing angle.

In graphics printing, "mottling" refers to an uneven coloration resulting from letterpressed printing of textured papers, mainly in larger colored surfaces. Due to the uneven surface, not all fibers of the paper are evenly saturated with color — unlike in offset printing.

== Measurement ==
The irregular lightness variations caused by mottling can be objectively measured with specially made instruments. These instruments simulate visual evaluation under different observing angles and characterize clouds / mottles by their size and visibility. Small to large mottles are measured under three observing angles, in which the scan length can usually be varied from 10 to 100 cm. The measurement results are independent of color and curvature of the surface and thus can be considered objective.

The specific measurement process for one such instrument is as follows. It first optically scans the surface and measures the lightness variations. The specimen is illuminated with a white light LeD at a 15° angle and the lightness is detected under three viewing angles to simulate visual evaluation under different observing conditions: 15°, 45° and 60° measured from the specular reflection. The mottling meter is rolled across the surface for a defined distance of 10 to 100 cm and measures the lightness variations point by point. The measurement signal is divided via mathematical filter functions into 6 different size ranges and a rating value is calculated for each angle and mottle size. The higher the value is, the more visible the mottling effect. The measured values are displayed in a graph showing the mottle size on the X-axis and the rating value on the Y-axis. Thus, target values for small and large mottle sizes can be established for paint batch approval as well as process control.

== Military ==
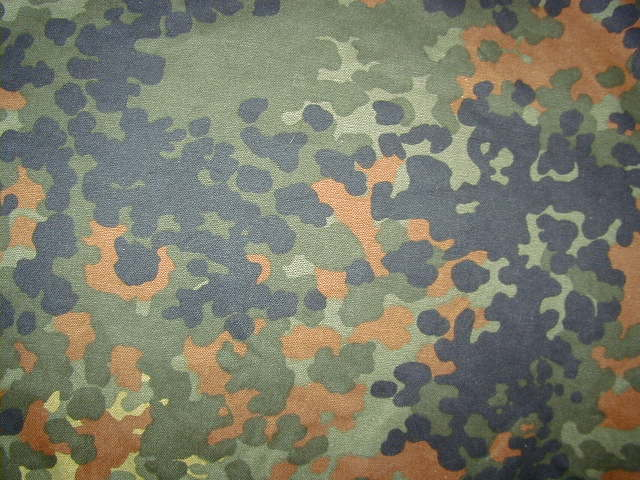
Flecktarn mottle camouflage

Military combat uniforms often use a mottle pattern, such as Frog Skin and Flecktarn.
