= Virginia Cooperative Extension =

Organizations based in Virginia

- Type: Federal-State-County Partnership
- Established: 1914
- Affiliations: Virginia Tech and VSU
- Director: Mike Gutter
- Location: Headquarters Blacksburg, in Virginia, United States
- Website: www.ext.vt.edu

Virginia Cooperative Extension provides resources and educational outreach to the Commonwealth of Virginia's more than seven million residents in the areas of agriculture and natural resources, family and consumer sciences, community viability, and 4-H youth development. Since the passage of the Smith-Lever Act of 1914, it has operated as the primary in-state outreach service for the commonwealth's two land-grant universities: Virginia Tech and Virginia State University. Today, Virginia Cooperative Extension has a network of faculty and staff at two universities, 107 county and city offices, 11 agricultural research and Extension centers, and six 4-H educational centers.

== See also ==
- Cooperative Extension Service
- Virginia Tech
- Virginia Tech College of Agriculture and Life Sciences
- Virginia State University
- Land-grant university
