= The New Virginians =

- New Virginians Logo

Background information
- Origin: Blacksburg, Virginia, USA
- Genres: Collegiate, Patriotic
- Years active: 1972–1993, 1994–2004
- Website: http://www.newvirginians.org

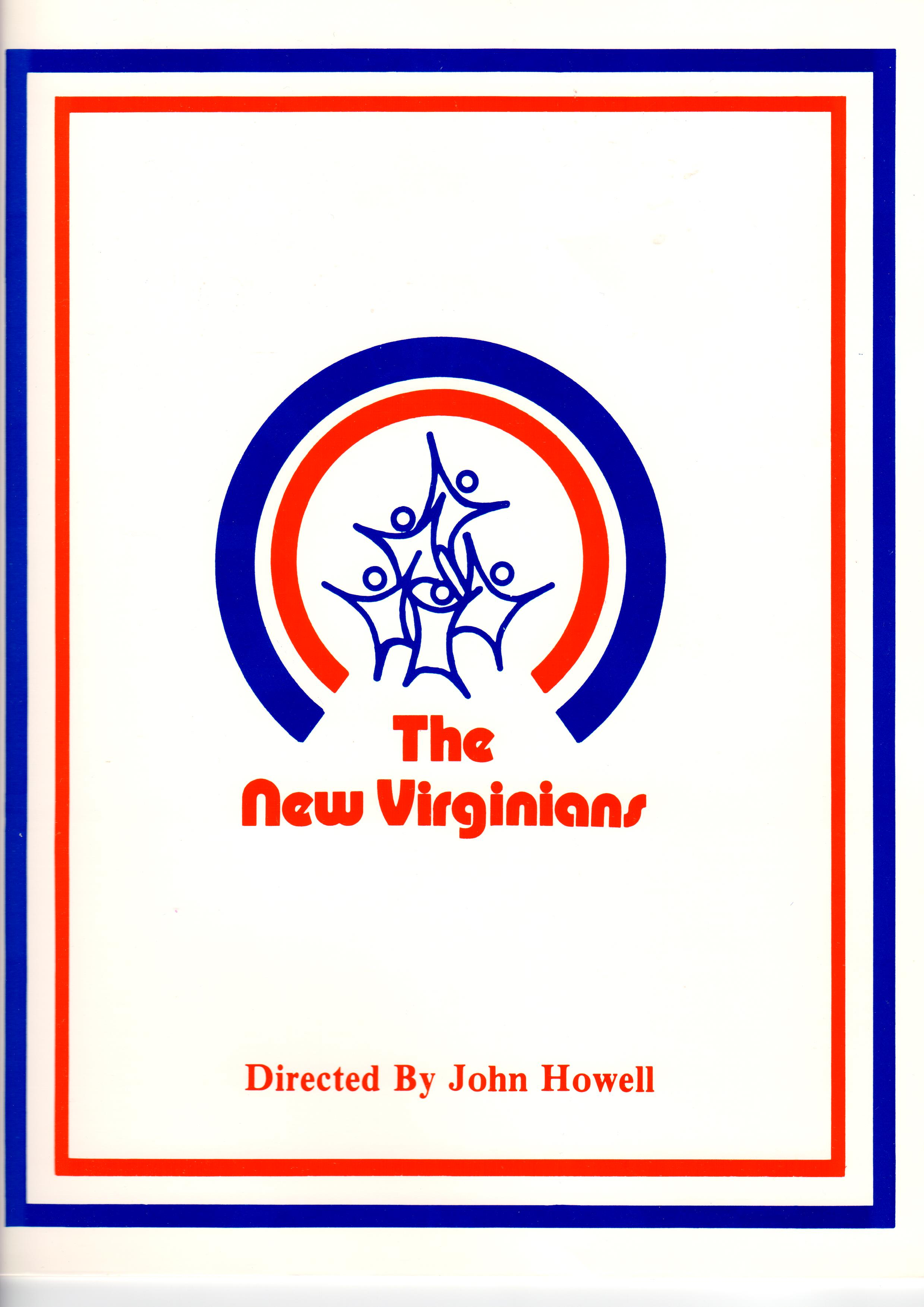
scan of PR folder from John Howell era

The New Virginians was a musical group from Virginia Tech founded in 1972. Its founder and first director was Stan Kingma, who had directed the Virginia Tech Glee Club, later called the Showmen, which was the nucleus of choral music singing at Virginia Tech. The group featured 24 singer/dancers, a 12 piece showband, a technical staff and a public-relations staff focused on a musical variety show which toured Virginia and surrounding states as "musical ambassadors of Virginia Tech" in shows hosted by civic groups, conventioneers, and sometimes the university itself. The group was known on campus for its annual "Homeshow" which was presented each spring and Christmas show during the holiday which benefited a local charity.

During those 21 years, the group produced 17 albums and performed a cross country summer tour sponsored by Georgia Pacific in the late 1970s which concluded with an appearance on the Dinah Shore Show. Georgia Pacific president and former Virginia Tech president T. Marshall Hahn was instrumental in arranging the tour. Stan Kingma, who directed the group for its first six years, and most of the original New Virginians staff and originators (Stan Kingma and Christopher "Kit" Bond) left the program at the end of the 1978 season. After a year of inactivity, the University restarted the program in 1979 under the direction of John Howell where it continued until the end of the 1993 spring semester when John Howell founded and directed the Early Music Ensemble at Virginia Tech. Founding member Associate Professor of Music Emeritus Paul Breske led the showband until his death in 1992.

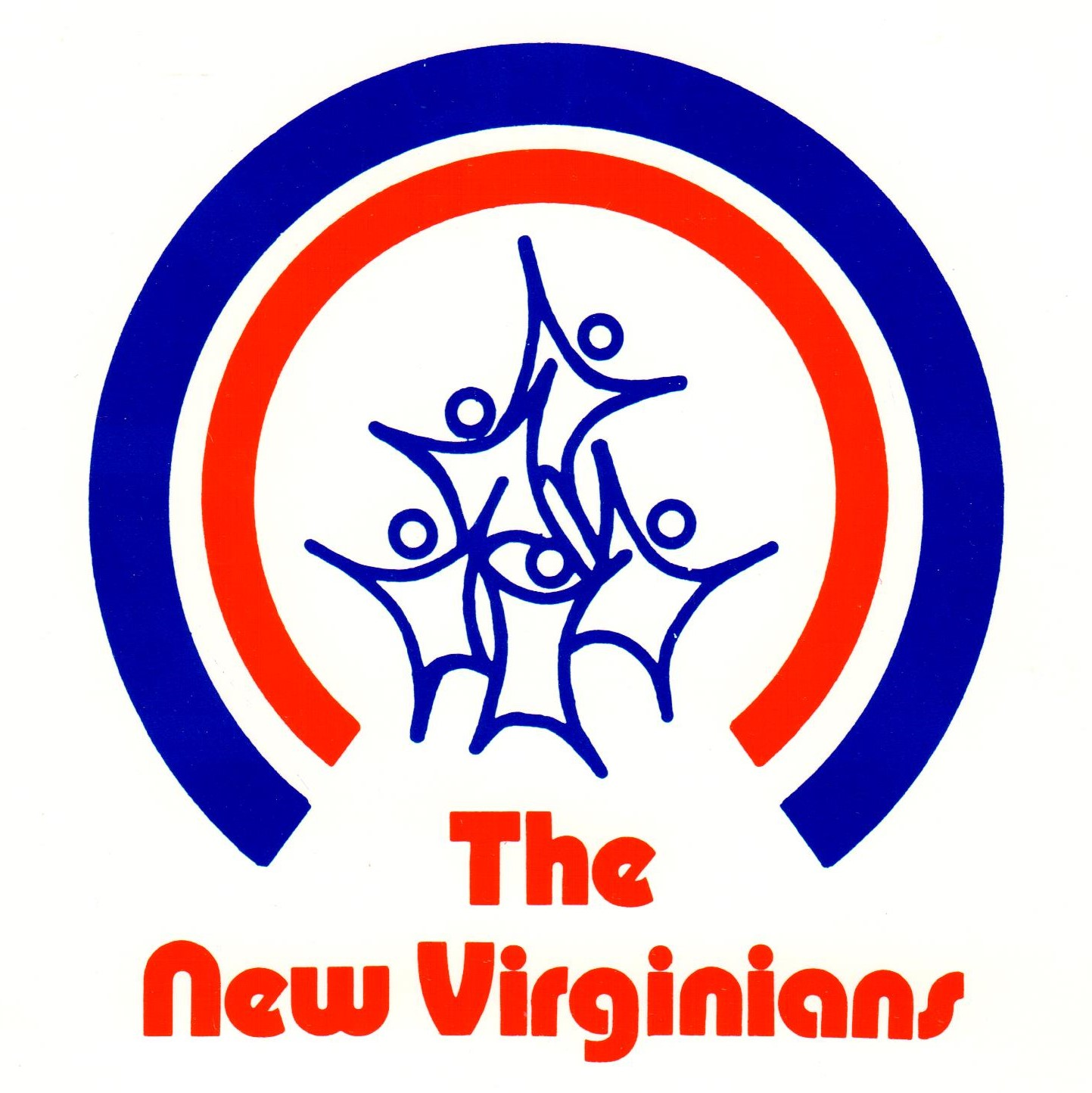
joyful

== Reorganization ==
The group was reorganized in 1994 as a 12-member Jazz Choir under the direction of Lisanne Lyons. The new group also disbanded the showband, replacing it with a rhythm quartet of student musicians playing guitar, piano, bass and drums. That instrumental group was later replaced with prerecorded musical accompaniment. The group continued in the Jazz Choir format for 10 years, winning the Downbeat Award two years in a row for the most outstanding jazz choir in the United States. University budget cuts in 2004 forced the loss of all vocal and instrumental jazz professors and the group was completely disbanded bringing a close to the 30+ year history of groups under the New Virginians name.

== Reunions ==
In July 2007, over 100 Alumni from the Kingma years came together in Richmond, Va for a reunion celebrating the 35th anniversary of the founding of the group. Alumni stepped back into the tasks they performed so many times as students as technicians set the stage, and singers and band members performed for the community.

== Discography ==
release year	title	format	notes
1993	Rockin the Place Tonight	CD (NVCD-9301) & cassette	1992–93 academic year, final album and final year of the group
1992	Putting It Together	CD (NVCD-9201) and cassette	20th Season. 1991–92 academic year
1991	Sing!	CD (NVCD-9101) and cassette	1992–91 academic year
1990	Dancing in the Street	cassette	1991–90 academic year
1989	Rising Stars	LP & CD (NVCD-9001)	1990–91 academic year
1988	American Made	LP and cassette	1987–88 academic year
1987	Headed for the Future	LP (NVLP-8701) and cassette	1986–87 academic year
1986	Pour on the Power	LP (WRA1-203)	1985–86 academic year
1985	That's Entertainment	LP	1984–85 academic year
1984	Great American Variety Show	LP and cassette	1982–83 academic year
1982	Reach Out and Touch	LP	1981–82 academic year
1980	They're Playing Our Song	LP (MRLP-3095)	1980–81 academic year
1977	Coast to Coast	double LP (MRC-3012)	1976–77 academic year, recorded at Buck Owens Studios in Oildale, California
1976	Celebrate	LP	1975–76 academic year
1975	ACT III	LP	1974–75 academic year
1974	Morning Stars	LP	1973–74 academic year
1973	Golden Afternoons	LP	1972–73 academic year
1972	The New Virginians	LP	1971–72 academic year, debut album, first year for the group

== Notable alumni ==
- Bob Lambert - Lighting director in the late 1970s, later worked for Disney Imagineering, rising to become a senior executive with The Walt Disney Company.
