= Virginia Tech College of Science =

- Motto: Ut Prosim (Latin)
- Motto in English: That I May Serve
- Type: Public University
- Established: 2003
- Parent institution: Virginia Tech
- Dean: Kevin T. Pitts
- Students: 4,355
- Undergraduates: 3,741
- Postgraduates: 614
- Location: Blacksburg, Virginia, U.S.
- Colors: Chicago maroon and Burnt orange
- Website: www.science.vt.edu

The College of Science at Virginia Tech contains academic programs in eight departments: biology, chemistry, economics, geosciences, mathematics, physics, psychology, and statistics, as well as programs in the School of Neuroscience, the Academy of Integrated Science, and founded in 2020, an Academy of Data Science. For the 2018-209 academic year, the College of Science consisted of 419 faculty members, and 4,305 students, and 600 graduate students. The college was established in July 2003 after university restructuring split the College of Arts and Sciences, established in 1963, into two distinct colleges, the other half becoming the College of Liberal Arts and Human Sciences. Lay Nam Chang served as founding dean of the College of Science from 2003 until 2016. In 2016, Sally C. Morton was named dean of the College of Science. Morton served in that role until January 2021, when she departed for Arizona State University and Ronald D. Fricker—senior associate dean and professor in the Department of Statistics—was named interim dean of the College. In February 2022, Kevin T. Pitts was named the third official dean of the College of Science.

== Academics ==
The College of Science contains eight departments for undergraduate and graduate study. In addition to these eight departments, the college also offers degrees through the College of Agriculture and Life Sciences' Department of Biochemistry, which offers undergraduate students a bachelor of science in biochemistry and graduate students a master of science or doctoral degree. The college also houses Virginia Tech's two largest undergraduate degree-granting programs, biology and psychology.

=== Rankings ===
This list details Virginia Tech's Graduate Science Program as ranked by U.S. News & World Report in May 2019. It is not inclusive of all College of Science graduate programs.

- The Clinical Psychology program ranks No. 47 in the US and according to U.S. News & World Report.
- The Statistics program ranked No. 37 in the US.
- The Economics program ranked No. 59 in the US.
- The Physics program ranked No. 61 in the US.
- The Mathematics program ranked No. 62 in the US.
- The Chemistry Program ranked No. 67 in the US.
- The Biological Sciences program ranked No. 73 in the US..
- According to the U.S. News & World Report's "America Best Graduate Schools 2020" (released in spring 2019), Virginia Tech's earth sciences graduate programs – part of the Department of Geosciences – ranked 28th in the nation. The program has ranked in or near this spot for the past 20 years. The department was founded in 1903, awarding its first bachelor of science degree in 1907.

=== Biological Sciences ===
As of 2010, the Department of Biological Sciences contained the largest undergraduate degree-granting program on campus. Undergraduates in this department can earn a Bachelor of Science and have the option to specialize in Microbiology and Immunology. Graduate students can earn a Master of Science or Doctor of Philosophy degrees.

=== Chemistry ===
The Department of Chemistry is located in Davidson Hall, Hahn Hall North, and Hahn Hall South. Undergraduates can earn either a bachelor of arts or a bachelor of science in chemistry, and graduate students can earn either a master of science or doctoral degree.[14] The department currently is headed by Alan Esker.

=== Economics ===
In the Department of Economics, undergraduates can earn a bachelor of arts in economics. Graduate students can earn a master of science or doctoral degree.[15] The department currently is headed by Sudipta Sarangi, who had held the position since 2015.

=== Geosciences ===
The Department of Geosciences offers undergraduates a bachelor's degree in geosciences by way of six options: geology, geochemistry, geophysics, geobiology and paleobiology, environmental and engineering geosciences, and earth science education. Graduate students can earn a master of science or doctoral degree. The Department of Geosciences' graduate program has two top-ranking programs: paleontology and earth sciences, according to U.S. News & World Report. The department was also listed as No. 1 in the “10 Best Paleontology Graduate Programs for 2019” by The Best Colleges. The department has been led by W. Steven Holbrook since 2017. In 2019, Sterling Nesbitt, an associate professor in the department announced the finding and naming of a new Tyrannosaurus rex relative, known as Suskityrannus hazelae. The find was covered in scores of media outlets, including the Associated Press and CNN. The department's faculty also has Virginia Tech's only member of the National Academy of Sciences: Patrica Dove.

=== Mathematics ===
In the Department of Mathematics, undergraduates can earn a bachelor of science in mathematics. Graduate students can earn a master of science or doctoral degree. The Department of Mathematics also offers a mathematics education option, in which students can earn master or doctoral degrees in education. The department is headed by Sarah Reznikoff.

=== Physics ===
The Department of Physics is housed in Robeson Hall and Hahn Hall North. Undergraduates can earn a bachelor of science or bachelor of arts. in physics. Graduate students can earn a master of science or doctoral degree. Graduate students can also participate in an internship program that leads to a master's degree in applied and industrial physics. Serving as head of the department is Mark Pitt, who has held the position since 2016.

=== Psychology ===
The Department of Psychology is located in Williams Hall. Undergraduate students in this department can earn a bachelor of science in psychology. Graduate students can earn a doctoral degree in four areas: clinical psychology, biological psychology, developmental science, and industrial/organizational psychology. (Students can earn a master of science en route to a doctoral degree, but the department does not offer a terminal master's degree). The clinical psychology doctoral program is fully accredited by the American Psychological Association and is a member of the Academy of Psychological Clinical Science Programs.[19] The department also houses the Virginia Tech Autism Clinic and the Virginia Tech Center for Autism Research, both based in off campus offices. Jamie Edgin chairs the department.

=== Statistics ===
The Department of Statistics is located in Hutcheson Hall. Undergraduates in this department can earn a bachelor's degree in statistics, and graduate students can earn either a master of science or doctoral degree.[20] The department is currently led by interim head David Higdon, a professor of statistics. The Department has created a data analysis and applied statistics master's degree to help meet overwhelming demand for data scientists in Northern Virginia and Washington, D.C. The courses, which will be conducted out of Virginia Tech's Falls Church facility in Northern Virginia, will provide professional in the Washington, D.C., region with advanced abilities in analytics, statistics and data science. The department has also initiated a program in Roanoke, part of the Virginia Tech Carilion Academic Health Center, in biostatistics and health data science.

== Academy of Integrated Science ==
The College of Science's Academy of Integrated Science is an interdisciplinary degree-conferring program offering majors in Computational Modeling & Data Analytics (CMDA), Nanoscience, and Systems Biology, and a minor in Science, Technology & Law.[21] The CMDA program is administered by faculty from the Department of Mathematics and the Department of Statistics, as well as the Department of Computer Science, the latter part of the Virginia Tech College of Engineering. Additionally, first-year and sophomore students are offered classes in two-year program, Integrated Science Curriculum, which “which combines chemistry, math, physics, and biology into learning modules on subjects like solar energy and nanoparticles.” CITE POPMECH In 2017, science and technology magazine Popular Mechanics said of the AIS program, “If technology employers could create the perfect college graduate in a lab, this is the skill set they would choose.” CITE POP MECH.

== School of Neuroscience ==
The College of Science's School of Neuroscience was approved by the State Council of Higher Education for Virginia in spring 2016. Harald Sontheimer led the school at its inception, but Michelle L. Olson is currently the director. The school offers undergraduate students the opportunity to study Neuroscience, Cognitive and Behavioral Neuroscience, Computational and Systems Neuroscience, and Experimental Neuroscience. Since its founding, the program has grown to include more than 600 undergraduate students. As of 2019, a program for graduate students is being planned for launch in 2020. In 2016, The Roanoke Times said the School of Neuroscience “was hatched to attract not just potential brain scientists, but future lawyers, architects, investment bankers, even journalists and actors, who would benefit from understanding the inner workings of the mind.”

== Research ==
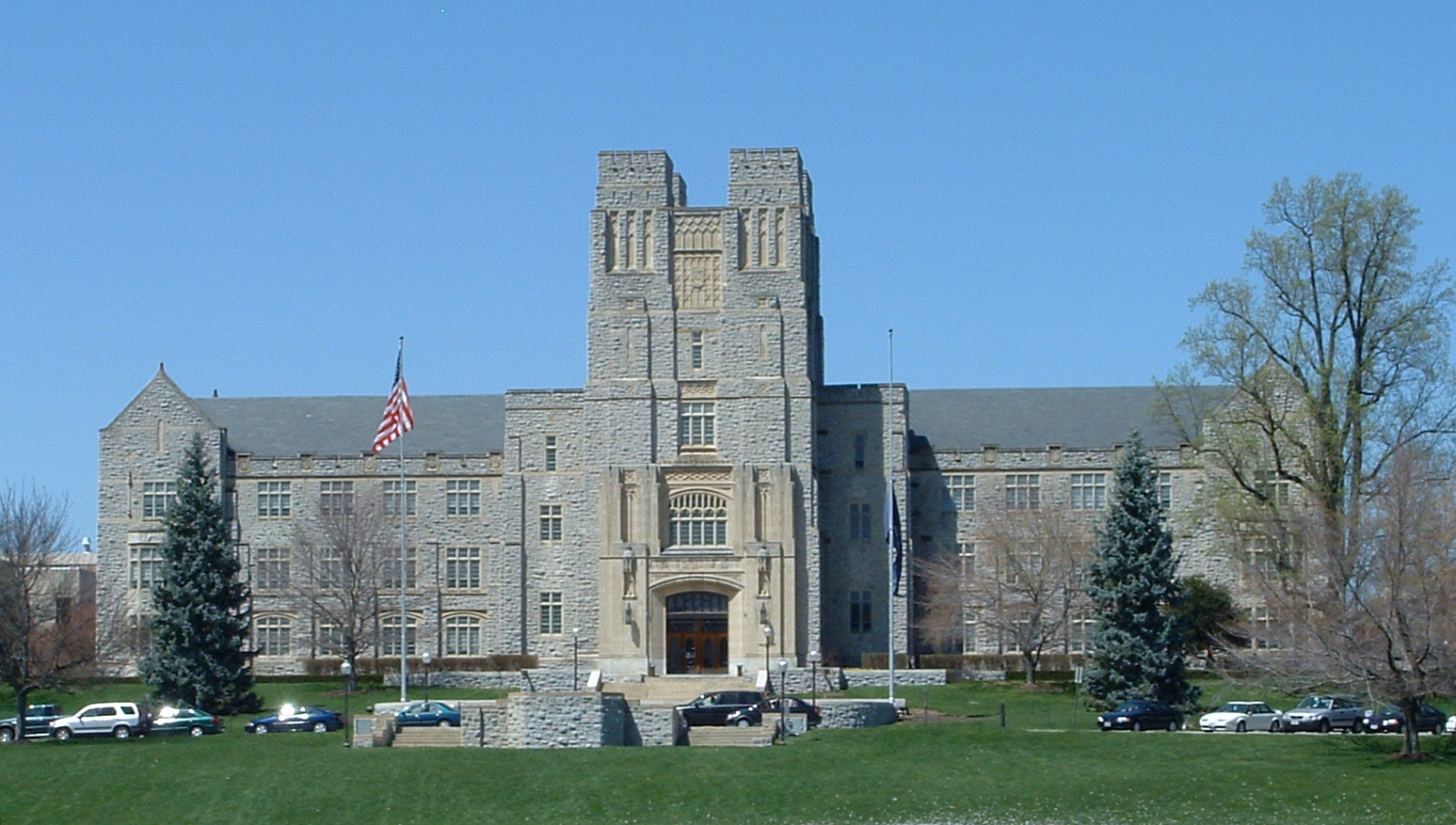
Burruss Hall

The College of Science received $31.94 million in funding from government agencies and private corporations in 2010. This money was used to fund research opportunities for students and faculty in the college. As of 2010, 57 percent of undergraduates graduating from the College of Science participated in research for credit.

Virginia Tech has numerous interdisciplinary research institutes available for use by the faculty and students of the College of Science, including:

- Institute for Advanced Study
- Fralin Life Science Institute
- Institute for Critical Technology and Applied Science (ICTAS)
- Institute for Society, Culture, and Environment (ISCE)
- Virginia Tech Carilion Research Institute (VTC)

== Notable alumni ==
- Benjamin Rubin (M.S. biology 1938) invented the bifurcated vaccination needle to deliver tiny amounts of smallpox vaccine. The needle is credited with helping to eradicate smallpox.
- Robert C. Richardson (physics 1958, M.S. 1960) won the 1996 Nobel Prize in Physics for discovering how helium-3 can transform itself into a liquid that flows without friction at temperatures near absolute zero.
- Roger K. Crouch (M.S. physics 1968; Ph.D. 1971) twice served as the scientific astronaut with the Columbia space shuttle in 1997.
- Jim Buckmaster (biochemistry 1984) is CEO of Craigslist, a centralized network of online urban communities that features free classified ads and forums on multiple topics.
- Mark Embree (mathematics and computer science 1996) became Virginia Tech's second Rhodes Scholar in 1996. Dr. Embree was professor of computational and applied mathematics at Rice University until 2013. He is currently professor of mathematics at Virginia Tech, Leader for the College of Science's Computational Modeling & Data Analytics division, and Associate Director of the Virginia Tech Smart Infrastructure Laboratory.
- Roger Craig (biology 1999, biochemistry 1999) became the highest one-day total winner on the game show "Jeopardy!" in 2010. He won $77,000 in one evening, surpassing the previous record of $75,000. His seven-day total winnings of $231,200—amassed before his run as the show's champion ended Sept. 21, 2010—was third highest for the show, excluding tournaments.
- John P. Grotzinger (Ph.D. geosciences 1985) Lead scientist for NASA's Mars Curiosity Rover project and professor at Caltech.
