= Bean pod mottle virus =

Bead pod mottle virus

Virus classification
- (unranked): Virus
- Realm: Riboviria
- Kingdom: Orthornavirae
- Phylum: Pisuviricota
- Class: Pisoniviricetes
- Order: Picornavirales
- Family: Secoviridae
- Genus: Comovirus
- Species: Comovirus siliquae

Synonyms
- Pod mottle virus

Species of virus

Bean pod mottle virus, or BPMV, is a species of plant pathogenic virus in the family Secoviridae. It is known to infect soybean crops.

== Description ==
BPMV is the viral pathogen that causes the disease Bean Pod Mottle in soybeans and other legumes such as snap peas. BPMV is a species in the plant pathogenic virus family Secoviridae, and genus Comovirus. It is characterized by icosahedral symmetry, non-enveloped, having two single stranded positive-sense RNAs (RNA-1 and RNA-2) separately encapsulated in isomeric particles, and are between 28 and 30 nm in diameter. (Bradshaw, 2007). The virus can overwinter in leaf-feeding beetle vectors (such as the bean leaf beetle), survive in perennial host species, and in virus-infected seed. In the North Central Region, the bean leaf beetle (Cerotoma trifurcata) is the most influential vector, by feeding on infected legumes and transferring virus particles to the next plant it lands on to feed.

The BPMV disease has most significantly affected soybeans; causing yield losses, reduced seed quality, and predisposing the plant to infection from the Phomopsis fungus, among other consequences.

=== Symptoms ===
Typical soybean foliage symptoms of BPMV include leaf mottling (if present), which is the appearance of yellow and green blotches on the leaf as well as leaf rugosity. Symptoms vary between different host species and virus strains. Mottling can be seen more severely on younger leaves with a distorted or blistery appearance. In stressful conditions such as hot weather and during the reproductive stages there are less symptoms. BPMV may also be a cause of green stem syndrome resulting in green stems and leaves while the pods and rest of the field has matured. Seed infected with BPMV can be discolored or mottled.

All of these symptoms are difficult to differentiate from other viruses or pathogens, so seeing these symptoms does not necessarily guarantee the plant has BPMV, lab testing can confirm. There can also be a combination of pathogens infecting the plant which can affect the severity of symptoms. Insect activity, especially of the bean leaf beetle or other known vectors, can increase the chance of BPMV presence.

== Pathogenesis ==
BPMV can be transferred via insect vector such as the bean leaf beetle or from infected seed which is a low occurrence, although it is still not fully understood how the virus gets from one host from another host, if not bean leaf beetles. Being a non-persistent virus, when the bean beetle feeds on infected tissue, the virus is carried around the mouthparts of the insect to the next host the beetle feeds on. The feeding creates an easy opening for the virus to get in, after which the virus begins its attack on the host.

The virus enters the host cell and replicates, then spreads to the surrounding cells, making its way through the plant systemically, as the plant develops symptoms. RNA-1 codes for replication proteins, and the proteinase and putative helicase are linked to symptomology of the virus. RNA-2 codes for coat and movement proteins, which are important in the cell-to-cell movement of BPMV.

Once the virus reaches the seed, it is believed that it is harbored in the seed coat, not actually infecting the embryo. This would result in the virus waiting for an opening to infect the new plant, such as the germination period where damage to the cotyledons can take place. Seed-seedling transmission occurrences are low. BPMV can also survive on an alternate host, which the beetle would transfer to the soybeans.

== Agronomic impact ==
BPMV infected seed that is planted will grow into an infected seedling which have the most severe yield losses, between 10-40% reductions have been reported. In addition to yield, BPMV can reduce grain quality through protein and oil content, reduced seed quality and performance (discolored appearance, low germination and seedling vigor), delayed plant maturation, and the predisposition to other stresses and diseases (such as infection of Phomopsis fungus decreasing germination of seed and seedling vigor).

=== Management ===
BPMV cannot be removed from the plant once infected, so it is important to take action to avoid the virus, or prevent it from spreading. There are genetic, cultural, and chemical options which should be used together in an integrated pest management plan, in addition to managing the vector presence as well.

- Genetic Resistance: Partial resistance to BPMV is available in some soybean varieties meaning there is less yield reductions, lower rates of green stem and seed mottling. Varieties with higher resistance are in development, thus commercially unavailable at this time. Other plants in the genus Glycine have been identified as immune, so it may be possible in the future to develop resistant lines in soybeans by interspecific crosses.
- Cultural Tactics: Plant certified, virus-free, good quality seed. Consider delayed planting of soybeans to avoid high populations of the bean leaf beetle, although other insects may be more prevalent then.
- Chemical tactics: If bean leaf beetles have been spotted in the field in addition to the virus in the past year, spray insecticides or treat seed with an insecticide to manage the bean leaf beetle, field history is important to consider in timing of foliar sprays. If the virus is present but the insect vector is not, spraying insecticides will not be effective in managing the disease.

Management of the virus is difficult because there is not a wide range of options, and none can solve the problem completely, but a comprehensive strategy is more effective than depending on one method.

Field scouting is useful in tracking the disease presence and future management. Scouting for virus symptoms during cool temperatures and rapid growth periods because optimum plant growth conditions will more readily show symptoms of the disease than stressful periods.

Also, scout for bean leaf beetles. The first-generation peak population should be checked around early July during the late vegetative or early reproductive growth stages. The second-generation bean leaf beetle peak should be checked during pod-fill in August.
