= Rimon School of Jazz and Contemporary Music =

Contemporary music school in Israel

Rimon School of Music
- בית ספר רימון למוזיקה
- Type: Independent
- Established: 1985
- President: Yehuda Eder
- Faculty: 90
- Students: 650
- Location: Ramat Hasharon, Israel
- Website: www.rimonschool.co.il

Rimon School of Music is a contemporary music school in Ramat Hasharon, Israel. It is Israel's largest independent professional school for advanced study of jazz, R&B, bebop, rock, and pop music.

The school was established in 1985, by a group of Berklee graduate Israeli musicians with the intention of making modern music more prominent in Israel.

== Programs ==
Rimon's curriculum develops musicianship and social influence through a variety of studies, experiences, and real-world projects. Students may choose to study in Conducting/Arranging/Composition, Performance, Songwriting, Contemporary Music Production, Electronic Music Production, Music Education, The Rimon Jazz Institute, and The First Year in English Program (for international students).

In 1992, Rimon formed an articulation and credit transfer agreement with the Berklee College of Music. Many students who attend Rimon elect to continue their studies to earn a bachelor's or a master's degree internationally.

The school is also partnered with Berklee Institute for Creative Entrepreneurship (BerkleeICE) to create an ongoing incubator and professional development series centered around music technology and innovation. The school also welcomes students from all over the world to study for one year at Rimon, in a full curriculum of music courses taught in the English language.

== Notable alumni and faculty ==
- Tom Oren
- Netta Barzilai
- Noa
- Mira Awad
- Etti Ankri
- Assaf Amdursky
- Benaia Barabi
- Aviv Geffen
- Valerie Hamaty
- Ariel Horowitz
- Aya Korem
- Miri Mesika
- Jasmin Moallem
- Ori Naftaly
- Daniel Salomon
- Keren Peles
- Kutiman
- Karolina
- Mika Karni
- Vira Lozinsky
- Itay Tiran
- Dana Berger
- Tali Rubinstein
- Bashar Murad
- Israeli hostage Alon Ohel was accepted to Rimon School of Music, but was kidnapped before he could attend.

== See also ==
- Music of Israel
- Culture of Israel
- Education in Israel
