= John Kluge Jr. =

American venture capitalist

- Born: 1983 (age 42–43)
- Education: Columbia University (BA); Babson College (MBA)
- Alma mater: Phillips Academy
- Occupations: Impact Investor, social entrepreneur, activist
- Board member of: | board_member_of =: Montpelier Foundation; NRC USA (vice chair); Kluge-Ruhe Aboriginal Art Collection; Nature Is Nonpartisan
- Spouse: Dr. Christine Mahoney Kluge
- Children: Mirren Wynne Kluge
- Parent(s): John Kluge; Patricia Kluge

John W. Kluge Jr. (born 1983) is an American social entrepreneur, impact investor, and author.

== Early life ==
Kluge is the son of the late billionaire John Kluge, founder of the media conglomerate Metromedia, and his wife, Patricia Kluge (née Patricia Maureen Rose), who adopted him in 1984 and raised him on their Charlottesville, Virginia estate, Albemarle House. He graduated from Phillips Academy in 2001 and Columbia University in 2005. He also has an MBA from the F. W. Olin Graduate School of Business of Babson College.

== Biography ==
After college, Kluge worked for several think tanks, including the anti-poverty think tank Rock and Wrap it Up, and the EastWest Institute, where he was made program coordinator for the institute's cybersecurity initiative.

Kluge founded Eirene, an angel investment firm that supports social causes and provides consulting services on cause marketing and analytic giving. One of his investments is Fonderie 47, a social enterprise that recovers weapons from conflict zones and melts them down to produce luxury items such as watches and accessories. In 2012, he co-founded Toilet Hackers, a social enterprise building sanitation projects in underdeveloped regions that lack adequate access to toilets. He also launched the first worldwide "Toilet Hackathon," in partnership with the World Bank and the Bill & Melinda Gates Foundation to gather entrepreneurs worldwide to brainstorm for global sanitation problems.

In 2018, he launched the Refugee Investment Network, a non-profit organization that mobilizes private capital to refugee entrepreneurs and businesses supporting refugees. It has secured more than $200 million in commitments as of 2018 and aims to mobilize at least $1 billion in investment by 2030. Kluge led RIN's early fieldwork in Mexico and Jordan and helped develop the organization's refugee lens framework for qualifying investments, its country-level market assessment methodology, which began in Mexico and expanded to Colombia, Jordan, Uganda, Kenya and Ethiopia, and its Refugee Opportunity Index, a diagnostic of national policies affecting refugees' economic inclusion. RIN's Jordan work included a 2021 market analysis with the Japan International Cooperation Agency. He later became the organization's senior advisor.

In 2024, Kluge opened Thistlerock Mead Company, a meadery (honey winery) located on a regenerative flower farm in Charlottesville, Virginia. Thistlerock became the first carbon-neutral meadery in the United States and the first carbon-neutral winery in Virginia, and in 2026 it shared the Community Climate Collaborative's Business Innovation Award. It is a member of the Central Virginia Green Business Alliance. The company has partnered with Bee:wild, a pollinator campaign of Re:wild, the conservation organization co-founded by Leonardo DiCaprio, including co-presenting the Virginia premiere of the documentary Bee Wild. Kluge also helped found the Virginia Mead Guild, a statewide association of Virginia meaderies, which created the Virginia Mead Trail with grant funding from the Virginia Tourism Corporation.

== Board and civic service ==
Kluge serves on the board of the Montpelier Foundation, which operates James Madison's Montpelier, as vice chair of NRC USA, the U.S. affiliate of the Norwegian Refugee Council, and on the board of the Kluge-Ruhe Aboriginal Art Collection of the University of Virginia. He also serves on the board of Nature Is Nonpartisan, a conservation advocacy organization. He is a member of the advisory council of Columbia University's Sustainable Investing Research Initiative and served as advisor to the Milken Center for Advancing the American Dream.

He previously served as a trustee of Babson College, where he helped lead the investment committee's first exploration of ESG and DEI investing, and as a director of the U.S.-Mexico Foundation. He has also served as a director of the New Hill Development Corporation and the Fonderie 47 Foundation, and as co-chair of the Virginia Policy Entrepreneurship Lab.

Kluge was a member of the Charlottesville Human Rights Commission, a volunteer body appointed by City Council to advise on civil and human rights policy and enforce the city's human rights ordinance.

In April 2020, during the COVID-19 pandemic, Kluge and restaurateur Hunter Smith launched Frontline Foods Charlottesville, a local chapter of the volunteer program run in partnership with World Central Kitchen that paid area restaurants to provide meals to health care workers and first responders. Within its first weeks, the chapter delivered more than 18,000 meals with the help of over 90 volunteers.

He is the author or co-author of three books: Charity & Philanthropy for Dummies (2013) and John Kluge: Stories (2008), published by Columbia University Press.

In 2026, Kluge and Dr. Christine Mahoney published Banking on Belonging: Why Investing in Refugee Entrepreneurs Benefits Everyone (Columbia University Press), which sets out a refugee lens investing framework for classifying investments in refugee-owned businesses and in funds focused on displaced people.

== Personal life ==
Kluge is married to Dr. Christine Mahoney, Chief Innovation Officer and Professor of Politics and Public Policy at the University of Virginia. The couple co-founded the Alight Fund, an investment platform for refugee entrepreneurs, which was the precursor to Kluge's Refugee Investment Network.

Kluge inherited a parcel of his father's estate in Virginia, but it was sold to The Trump Organization who previously purchased his mother's adjacent vineyard and winery operations that became the Trump Winery. In 2017, after President Donald Trump announced a tariff against Mexican products, Kluge raised $25,000 as a proposal for a flag-raising ceremony in front of the winery to celebrate Mexican-American partnership. In 2021, he helped launch the "truth farm," a public art installation with works by Ana Teresa Hernandez and others, dedicated to conversations about immigration, next to the Trump family winery.

== Selected works ==
=== Books ===
- Kluge, John Jr.; Mahoney, Christine (2026). Banking on Belonging: Why Investing in Refugee Entrepreneurs Benefits Everyone. Columbia University Press. ISBN 978-0-231-21812-2.
- Muth, Karl T.; Lindenmayer, Michael T. S.; Kluge, John (2014). Charity & Philanthropy For Dummies. Wiley. ISBN 978-1-119-94187-3.
- Kluge, John Jr. (2008). John Kluge: Stories. Columbia University Press.

=== Articles ===
- Kluge, John Jr.; Mahoney, Christine (2026). "Building the Refugee Economy". Stanford Social Innovation Review. 24 (3): 34–41.
- Kluge, John Jr.; Mahoney, Christine (June 24, 2026). "A Blueprint for Belonging: Scaling Refugee Lens Investing Worldwide". ChangeThis. Porchlight Book Company.
- Kluge, John Jr. (April 18, 2025). "Into the breach". Columbia Daily Spectator.
- Kluge, John; Docking, Tim (January 14, 2019). "The New Era of Refugee Investing". Stanford Social Innovation Review.
- Kluge, John W.; Docking, Timothy W. (December 18, 2018). "Hidden Opportunity: How Investors Can Unlock the Potential of Refugee Entrepreneurs". NextBillion.
- Contributor column, Forbes, 2016–2021. https://www.forbes.com/sites/johnkluge/
