= Sabbo =

Sabbo may refer to

- Sabbo and Kuti, Israeli music duo
- Álvaro Sabbo (1926–2024), Portuguese equestrian competitor in the 1956 Summer Olympics and 1960 Summer Olympics
- Augusto Sabbo (1887–1971), Portuguese football manager
