= Adi Choir =

Israeli choir

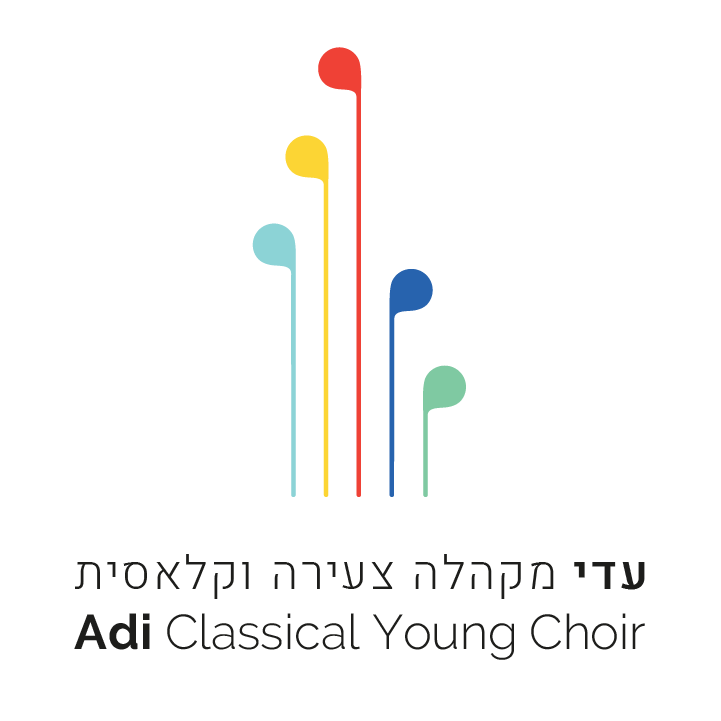
Logo of Adi Choir (starting year 12)

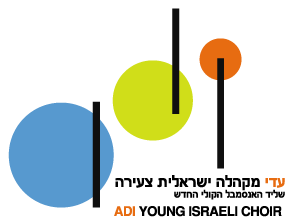
Old Logo of Adi Choir (years 1-12)

Adi – The Young Israeli Choir Next to the Israeli Vocal Ensemble is an Israeli choir formed by Ishai Shtekler and Gony Bar-Sela in 2006, and is one of the few choirs in Israel which are composed of people who are 20 and 30 years old. The Choir works mainly in Tel Aviv, but performs all over Israel. The choir is not categorized as professional, as the singers are not paid, however - the level of its performances is considered professional and it regularly gains praises for concerts.

Adi choir has 25 young singers; most of them are with years of prior experience from children's choirs, music departments in high-schools, and music academies. In 2009 the choir underwent administrative changes, and now functions with Oded Shomrony as its conductor and musical director, and under the patronage of the New Israeli Vocal Ensemble (conducted by Yuval Ben-Ozer).

Adi Choir strives to be a home for young singers (regardless of their economic background), and therefore is one of the few choirs in Israel that don't charge money from its singers for participating.

== Performances ==
Adi has performed with many orchestras and choirs from Israel and abroad. In the past couple of years this includes: a few visits with performances in Louis Lewandowski Festival in Berlin, a visit with performances in Rossi Fest in Serbia, a performance with the Jerusalem Baroque Orchestra, the Kfar Saba Chamber Choir and a few performances in festivals such as the "Jewish Music Days Festival" in Haifa, "The Music Holiday" in Tel Aviv, "The A-Capella Festival" in Ein Hod, and many more. Additionally, it performs in high-schools as part of an educational performance recognized by the Ministry of Education.

Adi has also participated in recording to Yoni Rechter's and to Aya Corem's disks.

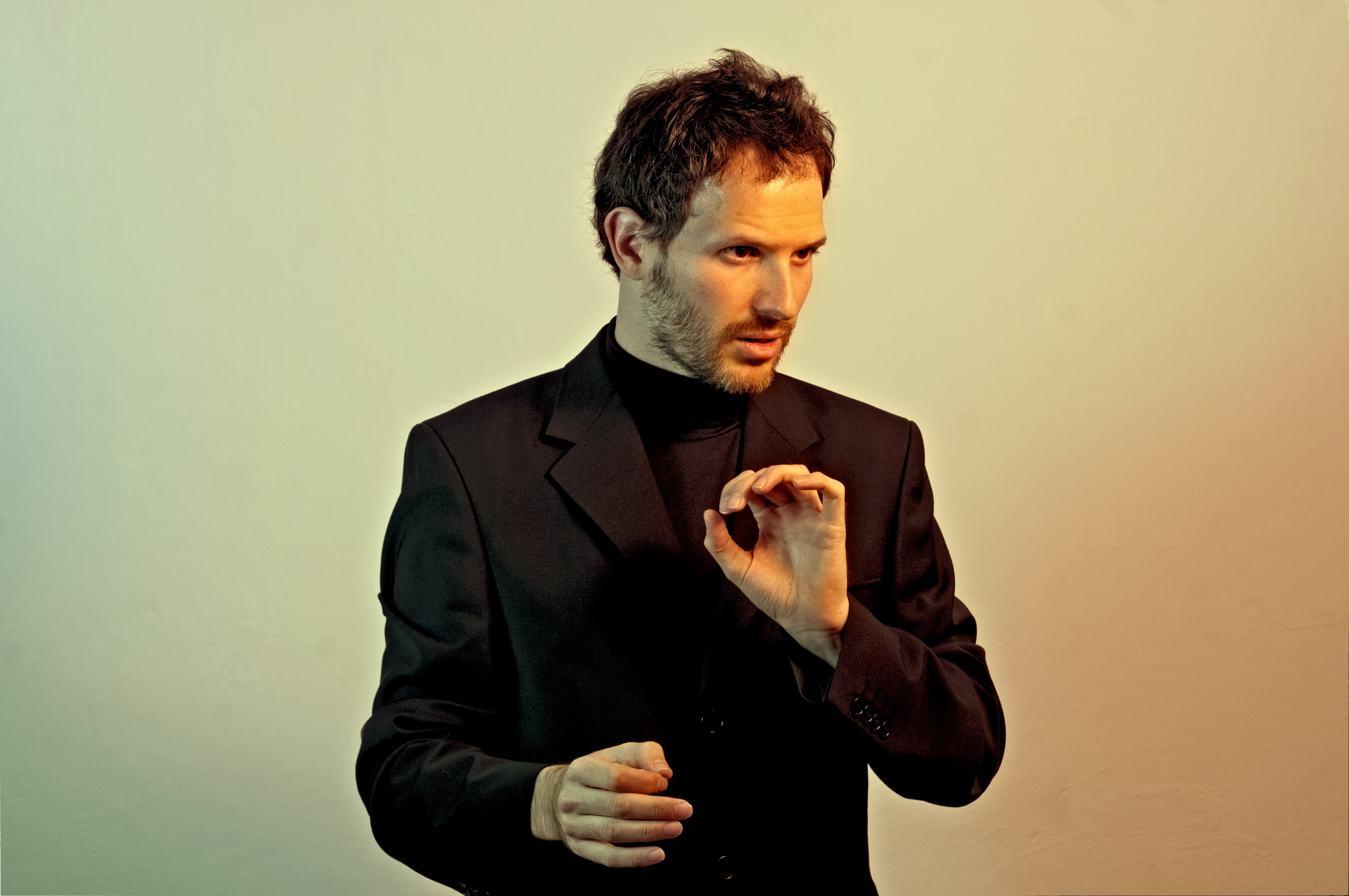
Oded Shomrony - conductor

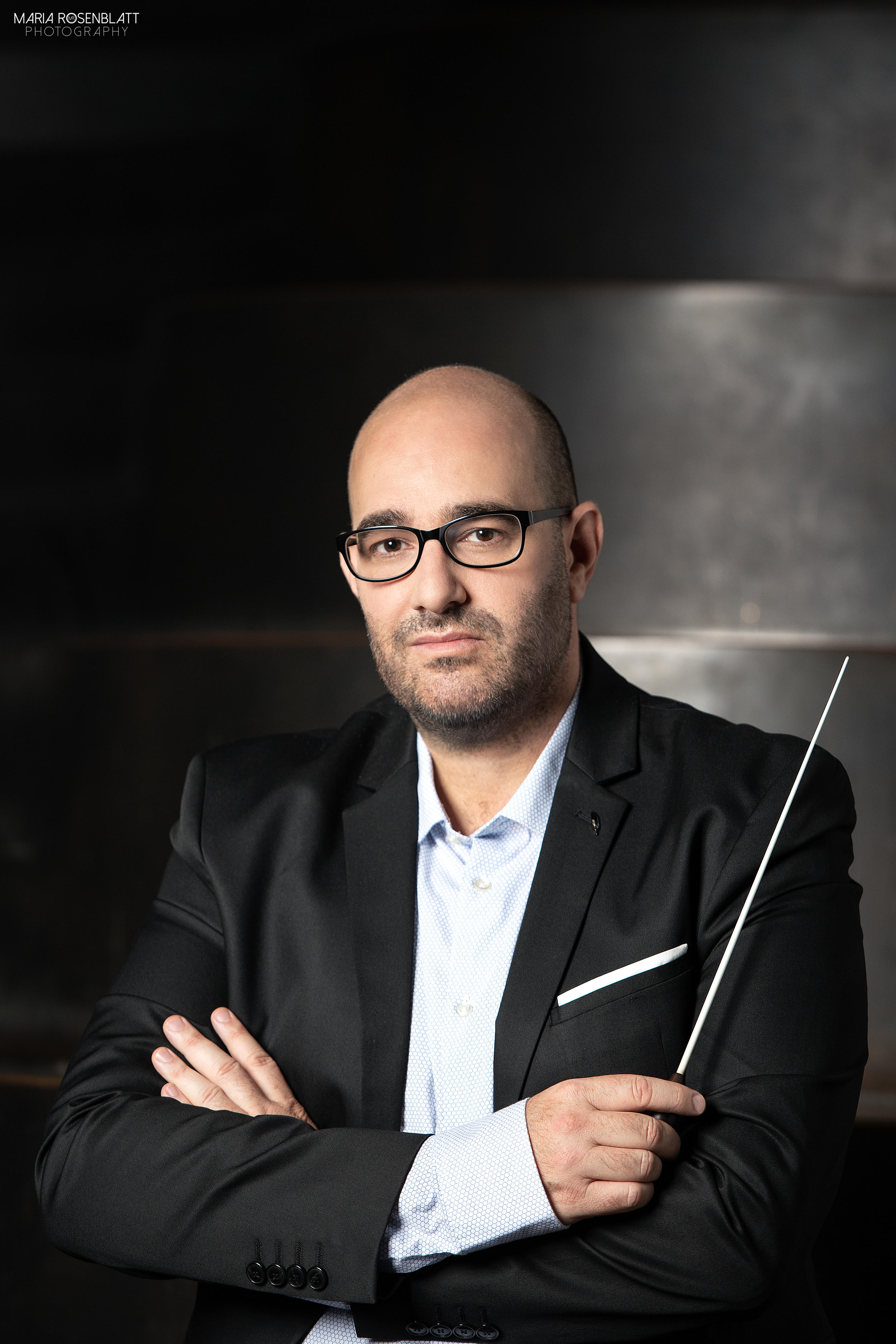
Ishai Shtekler - formed the choir

== Musical repertoire ==
Adi sings a variety of musical types, from Renaissance music to today's modern works. Adi mostly performs with A cappella music.

== Conductor ==
Oded Shomrony serves as the conductor and musical director of the choir. Shomroni possesses a master's degree in conducting from the Jerusalem Academy of Music and Dance, and started conducting at age of 17 as an assistant-conductor in the international workshop of opera in Tel Aviv. Since then he has served as the conductor of the Moran Singers Ensemble, the musical director and baritone singer of the Talamus Quartet, the musical manager of Orotorio Choir, and the musical manager of the "Open Concert" project. Oded has conducted many orchestras including the Israeli Cameri Orchestra, and teaches at the Jerusalem Academy of Music and Dance.

Ruth Alon serves as assistant conductor of the choir. In 2010, Ruth graduated with a B.Mus Composition Degree with top merits, from The Jerusalem Academy of Music and Dance. Ruth studied with numerous leading Israeli composers and participated in master-classes and workshops with composers from around the world. Ruth reached the finals of several competitions, won 3rd place in the Alfred Schnittke International Composition Competition, and is a receiver of several grants and scholarships. Today, Ruth is a member of the Israeli Composers’ League (branch of ISCM and ACL in Israel) and Israeli Women Composers Forum, among numerous other musical activities.
