= Southern Avenue (band) =

Band in Tennessee, US

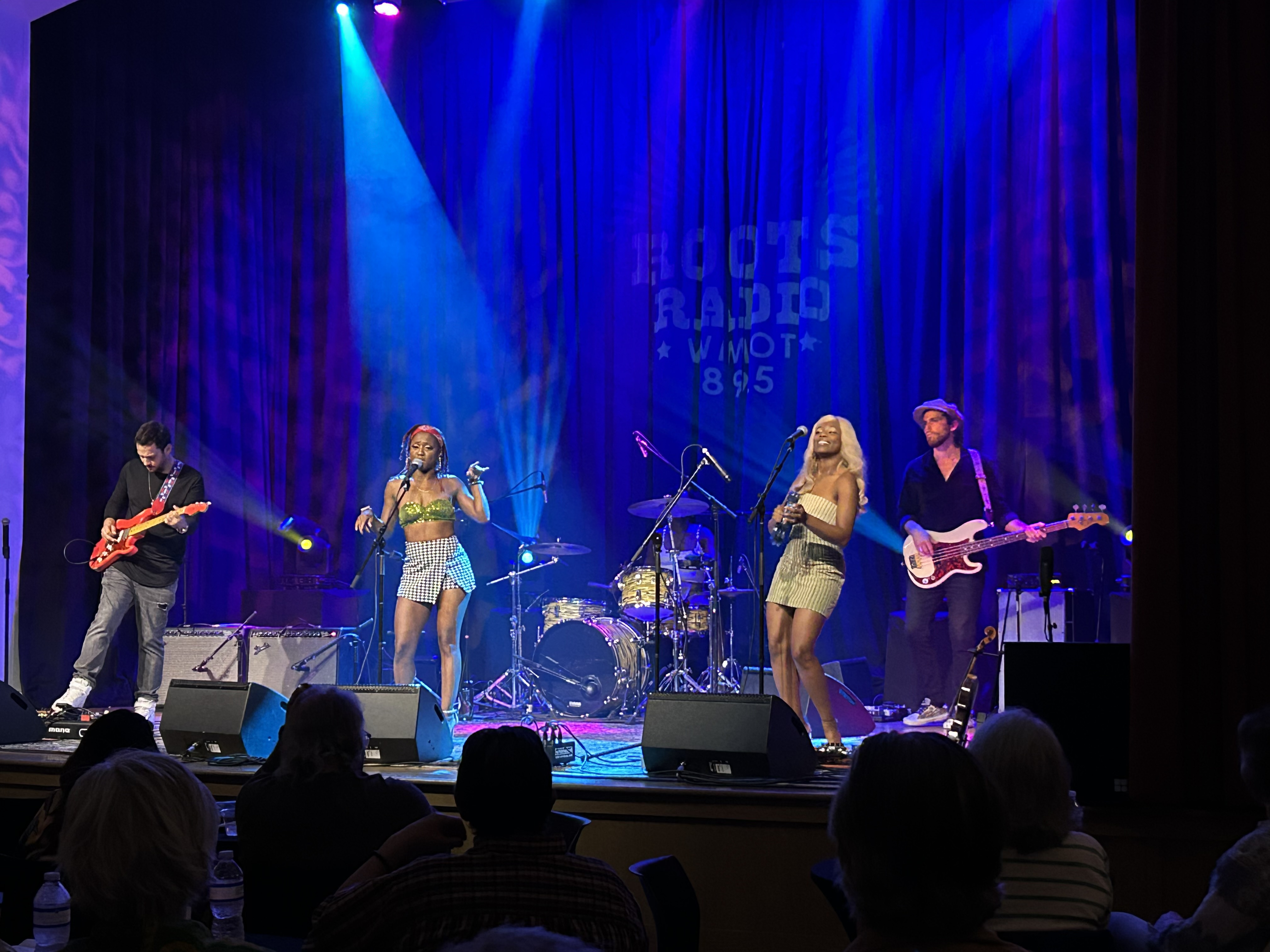
- Southern Avenue performing for WMOT Roots Radio in May 2025

Background information
- Origin: Memphis, Tennessee, United States
- Genres: Blues, soul blues, gospel
- Years active: 2015–present
- Label: Stax Records
- Members: Tierinii Jackson; Ori Naftaly; Gage Markey; Tikyra Jackson; Ava Jackson
- Past members: Daniel McKee; Evan Sarver; Jeremy Powell
- Website: Official website

Southern Avenue is an American five- to six-member blues and soul blues band from Memphis, Tennessee, United States. Formed in 2015, they took their name from a street in Memphis running from the easternmost part of the city limits to "Soulsville", which was the original home of Stax Records. Rock 103 described them as "the most talked about band in Memphis." Southern Avenue reached the finals of the International Blues Challenge in 2016.

Their self-titled debut album entered the US Billboard Top Blues Albums Chart at number 6 in February 2017, and reached number 1 on the iTunes Blues Chart.

== Career ==
The band's eventual leader, Ori Naftaly, grew up in Israel and relocated to Memphis in 2013 to compete for Israel in the International Blues Challenge competition. After advancing to the IBC Semi-Finals (the highest an Israeli artist had placed at that point in time), Naftaly made the move permanent and toured the United States with his own band. However, Naftaly became disenchanted with his own outfit and later met the Memphis native Tierinii Jackson, a vocalist who introduced him to her drumming sister, Tikyra. Other musicians joined the fledgling outfit in 2015 who took the band name Southern Avenue, in recognition of the Memphis street. They toured the United States and in Europe, appearing at several music festivals and competed themselves at the International Blues Challenge in January 2016, representing Memphis. Less than a year after their formation, they signed a recording contract with Stax Records.

Their self-titled debut album was released in February 2017 via Stax Records, a division of Concord Music Group. It was mixed and produced by Kevin Houston. Southern Avenue included ten songs, nine of which were penned by Naftaly and Tierinii Jackson, and the track-list also included a cover of Ann Peebles' "Slipped, Tripped and Fell In Love". The collection featured guest appearances from Luther Dickinson of the North Mississippi Allstars and trumpeter Marc Franklin of the Bo-Keys. The album was recorded at Inside Sounds in Memphis and at Zebra Ranch in Coldwater, Mississippi. One journalist described their music as "unique blend of gospel-tinged R&B vocals, roots/blues-based guitar work and soul-inspired songwriting".

In June 2017, they performed at an event for Rock and Wrap it Up. The North Mississippi Allstars invited Southern Avenue to support them on their "Prayer for Peace" tour. Southern Avenue's debut album entered the US Billboard Top Blues Albums Chart at number 6. The band toured across the US until October 2017.

Southern Avenue played at Firefly Music Festival in Dover, Delaware on June 15, 2018 and the Waterfront Blues Festival in Portland, Oregon on July 6, 2019.

== Band members ==
- Tierinii Jackson (lead vocals)
- Ori Naftaly (guitar)
- Tikyra Jackson (drums, vocals)
- Ava Jackson (vocals, violin, percussion)

Touring members

- Gage Markey (bass guitar)

Former members:

- Daniel McKee (bass guitar)
- Jeremy Powell (keyboards)
- Evan Sarver (bass guitar)

== Discography ==
=== Albums ===
Date of release	Album title	Record label	US Billboard Top Blues Albums Chart
February 2017	Southern Avenue	Stax Records	6
May 2019	Keep On	Stax Records	5
August 27, 2021	Be the Love You Want	Renew Records	–
April 25, 2025	Family	Alligator Records	–
