= Nof HaGalil =

Nof HaGalil: נוף הגליל; نوف هجليل
- City
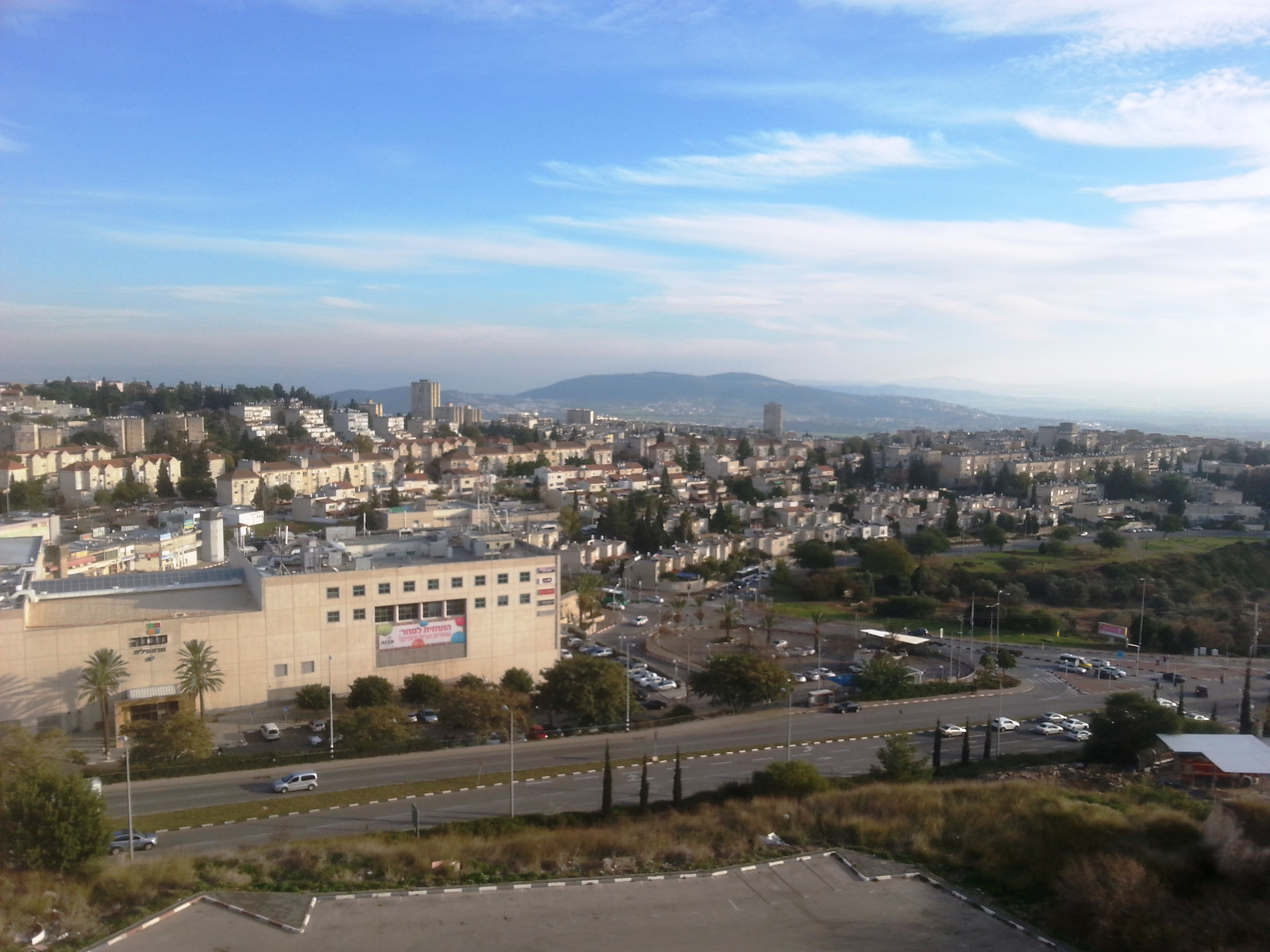
- View of Nof HaGalil

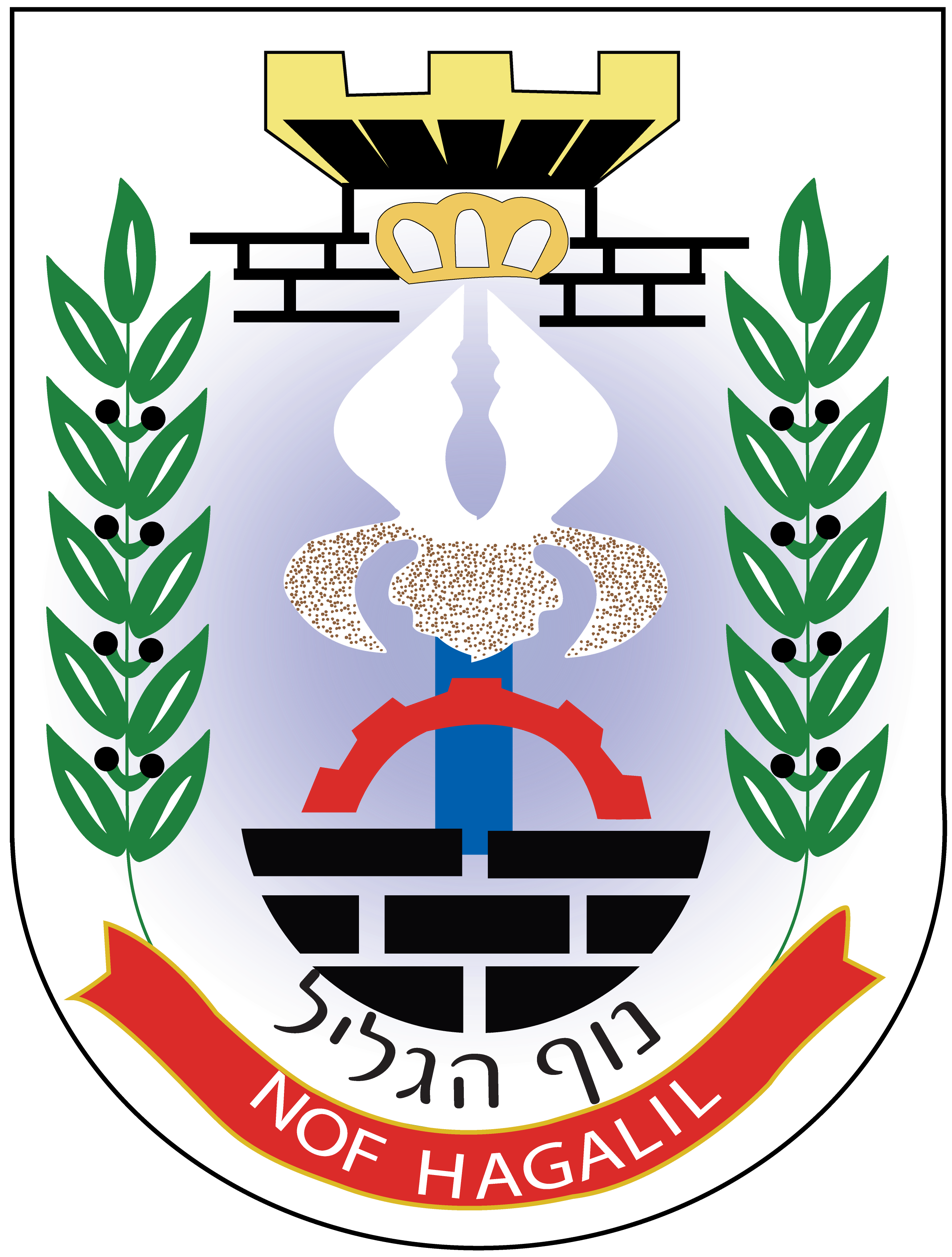
- Flag Coat of arms

- Location within Israel Location within Jezreel Valley region of Israel
- Coordinates: 32°43′N 35°20′E
- Country: Israel
- District: Northern
- Subdistrict: Jezreel
- Natural Region: Nazareth-Tir'an Mountains
- Founded: 1957
- City Status: 1974

Government
  - Mayor: Ronen Plot

Area
  - Total: 32,521 dunams (32.521 km^{2}; 12.556 sq mi)

Population (2024)
  - Total: 45,805
  - Density: 1,408.5/km^{2} (3,647.9/sq mi)

Ethnicity
  - Jews: 51.6%
  - Arabs: 28.7%
  - Others: 19.7%
- Name meaning: View of Galilee
- Website: www.nof-hagalil.muni.il
- From 1957 to 2019

Nof HaGalil (Note: (Hebrew: נוֹף הַגָּלִיל, lit. 'View of Galilee'; Arabic: الناصرة العليا, romanized: An-Nāṣira al-‘ulyā, Arabized Hebrew: نوف هچليل)) is a city in the Northern District of Israel with a population of 45,805.

Nof HaGalil was founded in 1957 as Nazareth Illit (Hebrew: נָצְרַת עִלִּית, romanized: Natzrat Ilit; Arabic: الناصرة العليا, romanized: An-Nāṣira al-‘ulyā, lit. 'Upper Nazareth'), it was planned as a Jewish town overlooking the city of Nazareth and the Jezreel Valley. In 1963, it was declared a local council, and in 1974, it formally gained the status of a city. Following the collapse of the Soviet Union, the city saw a large influx of Jewish immigrants from the former Soviet republics, which doubled the city's population and made it one of the centers of Russian Jewish culture in Israel.

Nof Hagalil also has a significant Israeli Arab community.

== History ==
The establishment of Nazareth Illit was conceived in the early 1950s, when development towns such as Karmiel and Beit She'an were founded. There were economic and security reasons for developing a town in this region, but according to Shimon Landman, director of the Interior Ministry's Department of Minorities, the Nazareth municipal elections in 1954, in which the Israel communist party Maki became the largest faction, were a source of concern.

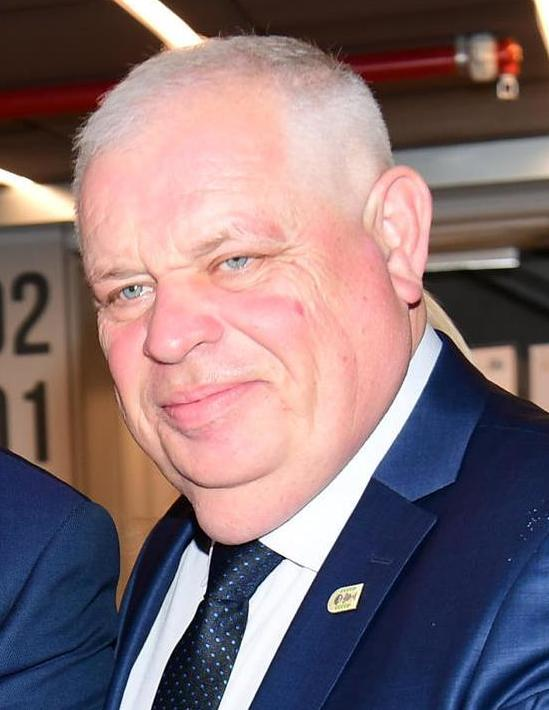
Ronen Plot, mayor

A parcel of 1,200 dunams of land, about half formerly within the municipal boundaries of Nazareth, was allocated in 1954, relying on a law that permitted expropriations for public purposes. Protests at this action reached the Supreme Court of Israel, which in 1955 accepted (HCJ 30/55) the government's word that the sole purpose of the land was to erect government facilities. However, it had already been decided that only 109 dunams would be used for that purpose and planning for residential neighborhoods continued. The first dwellings were completed in September 1956 and the first residents moved in later that year.

The director of the IDF Planning Department, Yuval Ne'eman, stated that the town would "safeguard the Jewish character of the Galilee as a whole, and... demonstrate state sovereignty to the Arab population more than any other settlement operation." The historian Geremy Forman wrote that Nazareth Illit was meant to "overpower Nazareth numerically, economically, and politically."

Initially the city was referred to as the "Jewish neighborhood" of Nazareth, then as Kiryat Natzeret. The name Nazareth Illit (Upper Nazareth) was adopted in 1958. In 1961, Nazareth Illit was recognized as a municipal local council.

In 2019 the city was renamed Nof HaGalil (Hebrew: נוֹף הַגָּלִיל, lit. View of the Galilee).

== Development plans ==
In 2021, seven housing projects were under construction in Nof HaGalil. Construction has begun on the Haifa–Nazareth Light Rail which will pass through Nof HaGalil, with 7 stations planned throughout the city. The development of a large municipal park is nearing completion. It includes a petting zoo, an ecological lake, a planetarium, an astronomical observatory, a skating rink, an extreme zip-line course, a musical park, a botanical garden, and an amphitheater. A new government complex is also under construction and there are plans for the expansion of three commercial centers and a hi-tech park.

According to [reliable sources], although the city's Arab population has increased in recent years, the municipality has not approved the construction of churches, mosques, or public Arabic-speaking schools.

== Demographics ==
Historical population
Year	Pop.	±%
1972	15,400	—
1983	23,400	+51.9%
1995	37,700	+61.1%
2008	41,400	+9.8%
2022	43,479	+5.0%
2024	45,805	+5.3%

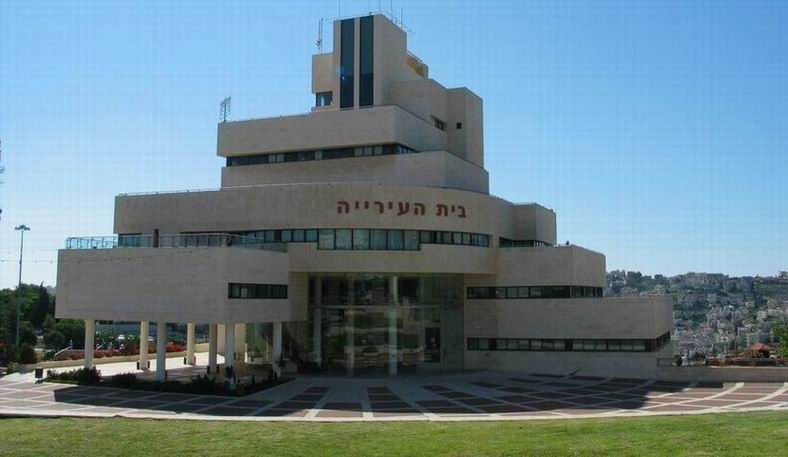
Nof HaGalil city hall

According to CBS, in 2014 the ethnic and religious makeup of the city was 64.4% Jewish and other non-Arabs and 21.6% Arab (7.2% Muslim and 14.4% Christian). In the 1990s, Nazareth Illit was the fastest developing city in the country with a growth rate of nearly 70 percent. Newcomers included new immigrants from the former Soviet Union and South America, as well as young couples. In 2012, Arabs accounted for 17 percent of the city's 40,000 residents. In 2022, 51.7% of the population was Jewish, 19.8% was Christian, 12.4% was Muslim and 16.1% was counted as other.

In recent years, the city has seen an influx of Bnei Menashe immigrants. 1,225 Bnei Menashe have now settled there, with 700 arriving in 2021 alone. The mayor, Ronen Plot, has been an ardent supporter of the Bnei Menashe community moving into the city.

== Economy ==
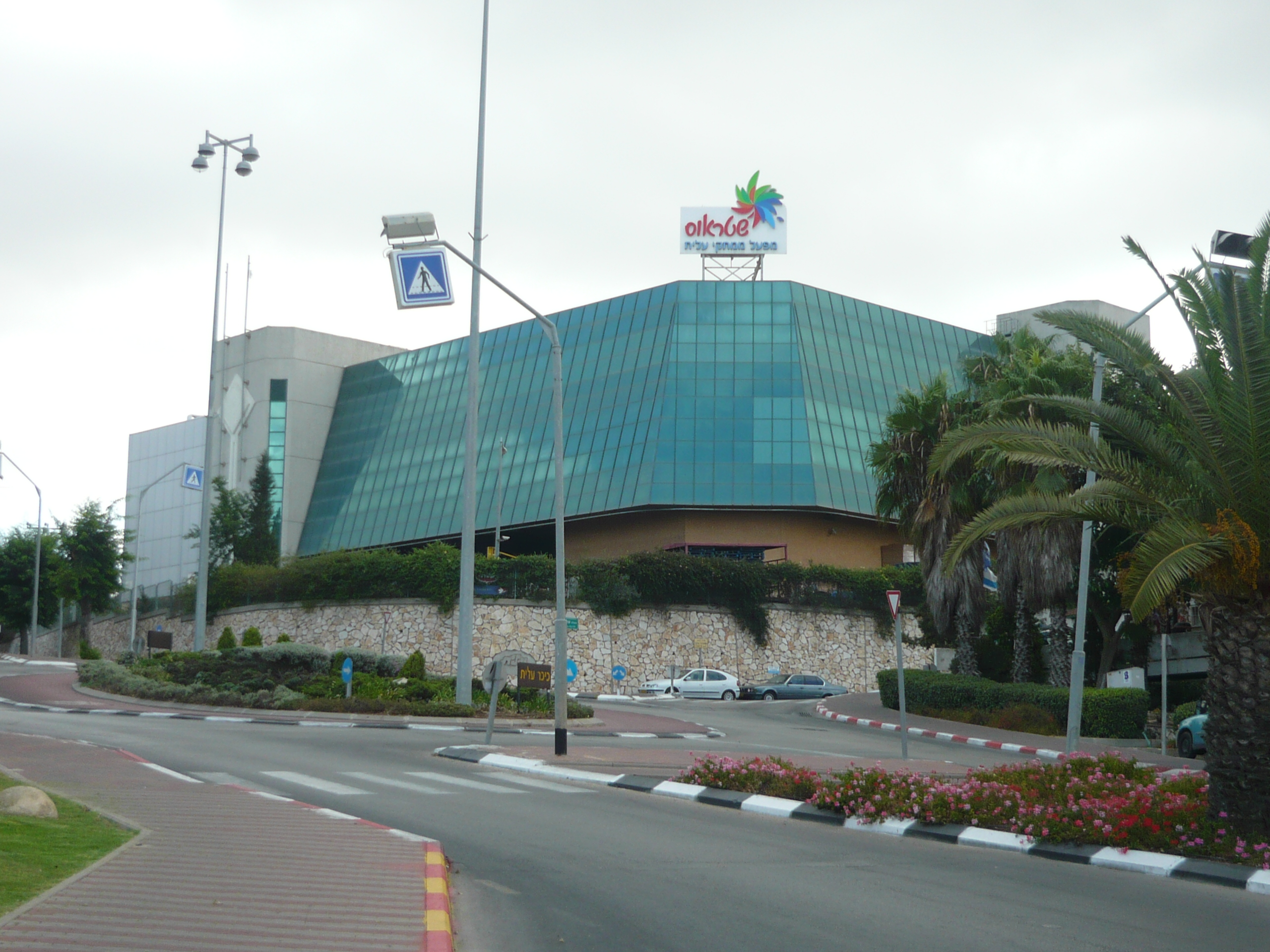
Strauss Group factory in Nof HaGalil

The Strauss Group chocolate factory in the city's industrial zone employs over 600 workers.

== Education ==
In 2010, the city had 12 elementary schools and two high schools. In 2019, after a successful school fundraising, a scientific and ecological greenhouse was set up on a 500 square meters site in the Atzmon elementary school. The students of Atzmon not only grow vegetables and fruits, but also invent new varieties and experiment with the scientific process involved in their development.

A new high school for religious boys opened in 2010 and the Yeshivat Hesder of Maalot, which combines army service with Torah study, opened a branch there. The city also has a regional engineering college, Nof HaGalil Technology College.

Although Nof Hagalil have four Arabic-speaking private preschools, its municipality has refused to open any Arab schools, in order to discourage continued Arab immigration to the city.

== Tourism ==
The Nof HaGalil municipality cares for maintaining the city's green grounds and the forestry of the city. Located by the city is Churchill Forest, the money for which has been donated by the Jewish community of the United Kingdom in memory of Sir Winston Churchill. The forest, which lies on the downslope between Nazareth and the Jezreel Valley, provides observation spots on the valley view.

== Sports ==
Hapoel Nof HaGalil is the city's major football club. The city's other football club, F.C. Nazareth Illit, plays in Liga Gimel.

The city's main football stadium is Green Stadium. In addition to hosting matches of the city's two football teams, the stadium hosted in the past Israeli Premier League matches of Hapoel Acre and Bnei Sakhnin whose stadiums did not meet Israeli Premier League. During 2013–14 the stadium also hosted Hapoel Afula matches.

The city's basketball team, Hapoel Nof HaGalil, plays in the IBA fourth tier, Liga Alef.

The city's table tennis team, Hapoel Nof HaGalil, plays at the Israeli Table-tennis Premier league. The team won both the championship and the state cup at the 2011–12 season.

== Voting Patterns ==
In the 2022 election, 41 percent of voters in Nof HaGalil voted for the parties of the right-wing coalition led by Benjamin Netanyahu, while 32 percent voted for the parties of the center-left coalition led by Yair Lapid and 26 percent voted for the Arab parties.

In the 2026 election, 35 percent of voters in Nof HaGalil voted for the Arab parties, while 32 percent voted for the parties of the right-wing coalition led by Benjamin Netanyahu and 30 percent voted for the parties of the center-left coalition led by Gadi Eisenkot. An additional 1.8 percent voted for the Reservists, and 0.9 percent voted for Amcha Yisrael. Voter turnout increased 23 percent from the 2022 election.

== Twin towns – sister cities ==
Nof HaGalil is twinned with:

- San Miguel de Tucumán, Argentina
- Leverkusen, Germany
- Klagenfurt, Austria
- Győr, Hungary
- Chernivtsi, Ukraine
- Uman, Ukraine
- Saint-Étienne, France
- Alba Iulia, Romania
- Kikinda, Serbia
- Birobidzhan, Russia

== Notable people ==
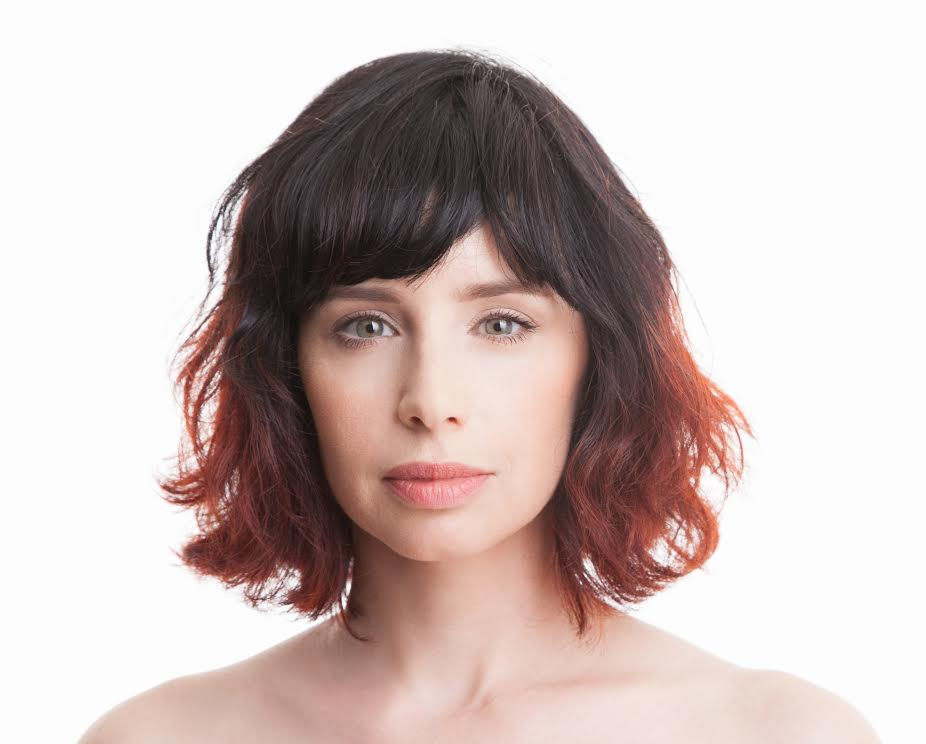
Aya Korem

- Dudu Aouate (born 1977), professional footballer
- Aya Korem (born 1980), singer/songwriter
- Naum Prokupets (born 1948), Moldovan-born Israeli former sprint canoeist
- Hisham Sulliman (born 1978), actor
