= Trump Winery =

American winery

Coordinates: 37.939100°N 78.498677°W

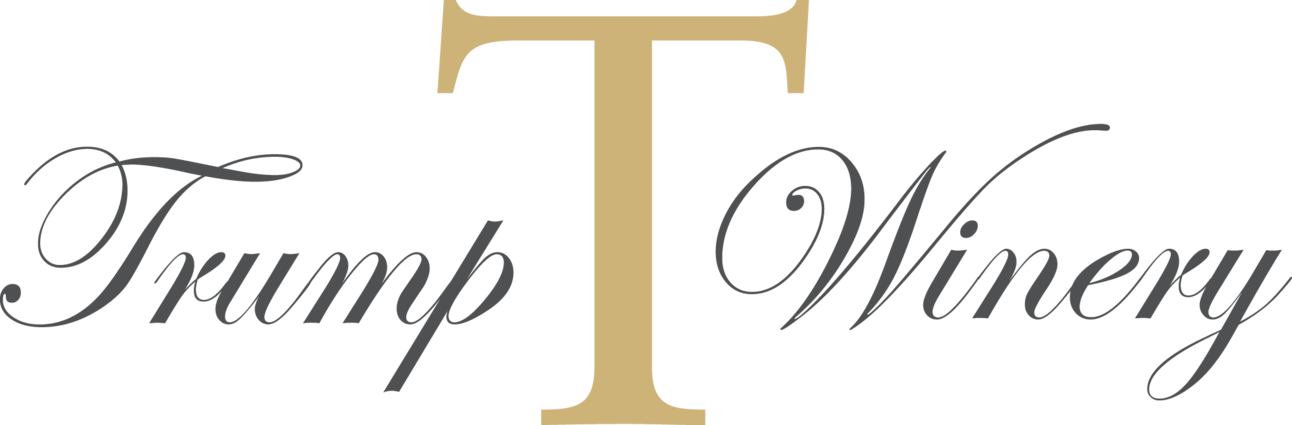
- Location: Charlottesville, Virginia, U.S.
- Appellation: Monticello AVA
- Formerly: Kluge Estate Winery and Vineyard
- Founded: October 2011
- Key people: Eric Trump, owner Kerry Woolard, General Manager; Jonathan Wheeler, Winemaker
- Parent company: Eric Trump Wine Manufacturing LLC
- Distribution: International
- Tasting: Open to the public
- Website: trumpwinery.com

Trump Winery (formerly Kluge Estate Winery and Vineyard) is a winery located on Trump Vineyard Estates in the Piedmont region of Virginia, within Albemarle County. It lies within both the Virginia and Monticello viticultural areas and is one of 23 wineries on the Monticello Wine Trail.

The winery and vineyard were originally established by Patricia Kluge in 1999. It was purchased by Donald Trump in April 2011 and officially reopened in October 2011 under the Trump brand. Since 2012, the winery has been owned and operated by Trump's son Eric under the corporate name Eric Trump Wine Manufacturing LLC.

The estate spans 227 acres (92 ha) of vinifera grape varieties, making it the largest vineyard in Virginia and the largest French vinifera vineyard on the East Coast.

Trump Winery produces approximately 36,000 cases of wine annually, ranking it behind two other Virginia wineries that each produce at least 60,000 cases per year.

== History and acquisition ==
Patricia Kluge, former wife of American billionaire John Kluge, kept Albemarle per their 1990 divorce settlement. Afterwards, Kluge spent her fortune establishing an award-winning vineyard and winery which opened in 1999. She and her third husband, William Moses, took out $65 million in loans and mortgaged the mansion to finance production expansion and a related real-estate venture. In 2011, the couple defaulted on the loans and Bank of America acquired the mortgage on the mansion, Albemarle House. The land outside the mansion's front door and bordering its long driveway is a 217-acre (88 ha) stretch of rolling greenery that had a former life as John Kluge's private Arnold Palmer–designed golf course. A quirk in the divorce settlement let John Kluge own this parcel, as his ex-wife kept the mansion and the land underneath, insulating it from Patricia's future financial woes. The parcel remained in the family after Mr. Kluge died in 2010, leaving it in a trust to his son, John Kluge Jr., with Patricia as trustee.

Trump, a longstanding friend of John and Patricia Kluge, purchased the 1,300-acre (530 ha) estate, including the vineyards and winemaking operation, out of foreclosure from three different banks for $8.5 million. He initially offered the banks $20 million to bail out Kluge Estate, but when they refused, he began to buy the property through foreclosure auctions and private purchases. After acquiring the winery, Trump hired Patricia Kluge as vice president of operations and William Moses as chief executive officer. He also bought the parcel directly from the Kluge trust for $150,000. The bank later alleged that Trump subsequently arranged for "No Trespassing" signs to be placed around the property and allowed the lawns to become overgrown in order to ward off potential buyers giving an appearance of Trump's exclusive access to the property, although the bank's property interest of the main house included right-of-way easements. Trump then purchased the land from Bank of America for $3.6 million, a significant discount from the $16 million the bank had paid at the foreclosure auction to retain the property and Kluge's original $100 million asking price the prior year.

In October 2012, Trump bought Albemarle House from Bank of America for $6.7 million, completing acquisition of the entire estate.

== Operations ==
In addition to the winery and vineyard, business operations include a hotel and facilities to host weddings, corporate and winery events. The 26,000 square-foot, 45-room mansion was remodeled into a boutique luxury hotel and opened in May 2015 as 'Albemarle Estate at Trump Winery.'

In March 2016, Donald Trump stated publicly that he owned "the largest winery on the East Coast," although Politifact later rated the statement as 'false'. Trump Winery makes 36,000 cases of wine per year compared to Williamsburg Winery and Chateau Morrisette Winery, which produces at least 60,000 cases per year, according to The Virginia Wine Board. Although, Trump Winery's 227-acre (92 ha) vineyard is the largest in Virginia and its French vinifera acreage is the largest on the East Coast.

In June 2024, the opening of Trump Cidery was announced expanding the winery business to 'crafting premium ciders.'

== Awards ==
The winery has received accolades from numerous wine competitions and press reviews such as 90 points from Wine Spectator for Blanc de Blanc, 91 points from James Suckling and Wine Enthusiast for Sparkling Reserve.

In March 2013, Wine Enthusiast magazine gave the 2007 Trump SP Reserve a 91-point rating, which was at that time the highest rating for a still or sparkling Virginia wine.

The 2020 San Francisco International Wine Competition awarded the winery's 2014 Sparkling Reserve, Best in Class-Brut, Double Gold, 97 points, scoring higher than those from Napa, Sonoma, Spain, Italy, Australia and Champagne.
