= Tali Rubinstein =

Israeli American musician (born 1984)

Tali Rubinstein טלי רובינשטיין
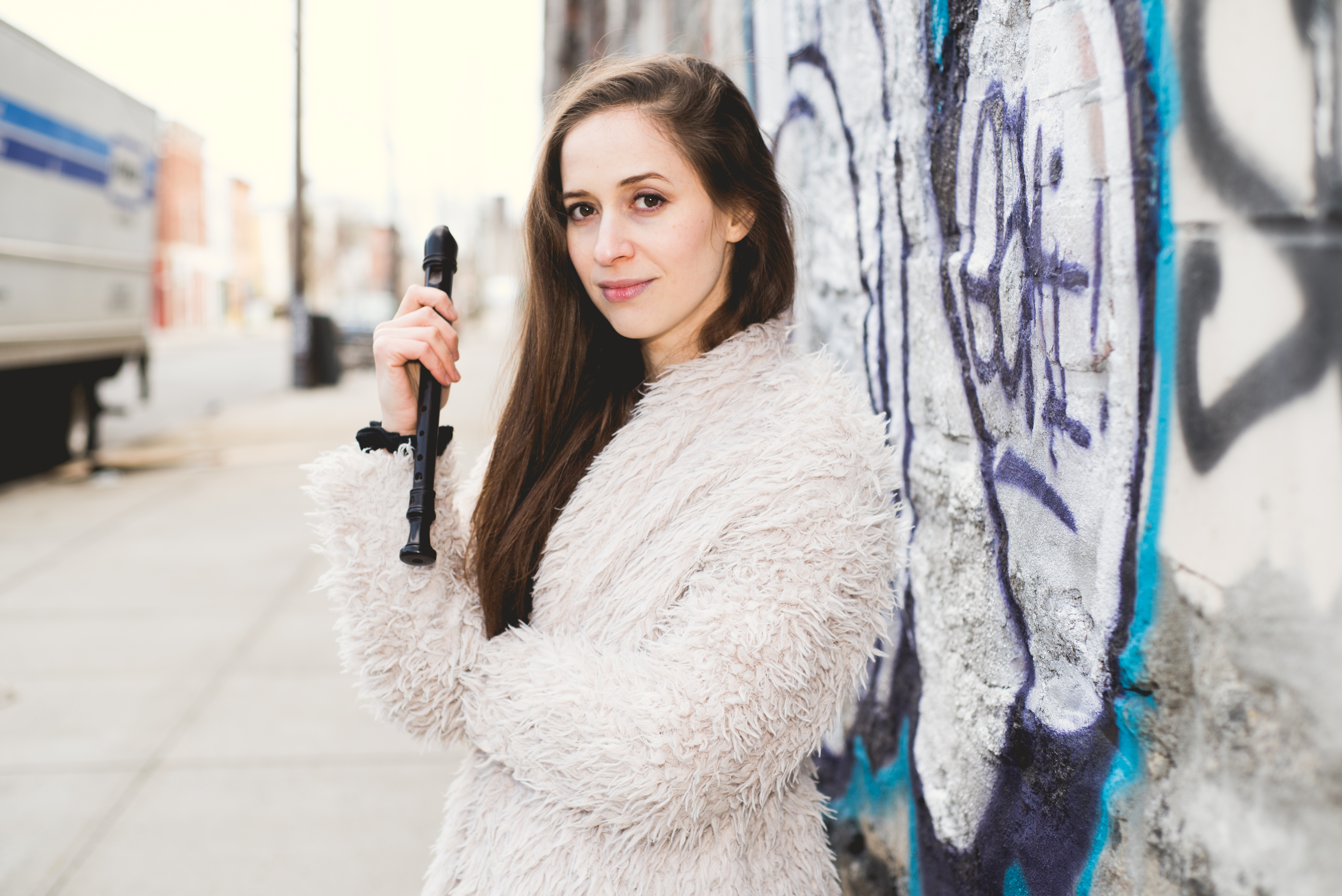

Background information
- Born: August 15, 1984 (age 42); Rishon Letzion, Israel
- Genres: Jazz, jazz fusion, World music, Classical
- Occupations: Musician, Composer, Teacher
- Instruments: Recorder, voice
- Label: Casa Limón
- Website: www.talirubinstein.com

Tali Rubinstein (Hebrew: טלי רובינשטיין; born 15 August 1984) is an Israeli American contemporary jazz and classical recorder player, vocalist, composer, and educator. She has been featured as a songwriter and performer on a Latin Grammy winning album, and was listed as an artist on president Barack Obama's favorite songs of 2018. She is a pioneer on the instrument and the first recorder player to be well versed in myriad styles of music, performing across the world with classical orchestras, her jazz quartet, collaborating frequently with Javier Limón, Paco de Lucía's band, and Brooklyn Raga Massive, among many others.

== Biography ==
=== Early life ===
Tali grew up in Israel, studying Early music on the recorder with her teacher Bracha Kol (he). She went to the Thelma Yellin High School for the Arts and graduated with honors. When she was 20, she went to Tel Aviv University to study classical music and math, but wasn't sure that was what she wanted to do and decided to take a break. Around this time, she enrolled in the Rimon School of Jazz and Contemporary Music, where she studied jazz and improvisation along with learning more about contemporary music, and this led to her deciding to pursue this fully as a career.

=== Music career ===
She attended the Rimon School of Jazz and Contemporary Music and later was the first recorder player to study at the Berklee College of Music in Boston, Massachusetts. After finishing her studies at Berklee in 2014, she was based in Brooklyn, New York, and starred in a YouTube series that documented her life living as a recorder player in NYC.

She released her first single "Falling" as a solo artist in 2018 on Javier Limon's label, Casa Limon Music. In February 2021, she released a duo album called "Cybird" with harpsichord and piano player Apollonio Maeillo.

== Other work ==
In 2017, Tali was a special guest on Univision's U-Lab White Sessions, where she was interviewed and performed some of her songs with Alain Mallet, and Nêgah Santos. She also was a featured performer in October at the Sopot Jazz Festival with Greg Osby.

In 2018, Carnegie Hall produced six educational videos with Tali for beginner recorder players.

In 2019, she was featured as part of a SpongeBob SquarePants 2-part Nickelodeon YouTube series for learning how to play some songs on the recorder.

She composed the music for David Trueba's 2020 film, "A este lado del mundo", along with Javier Limón, and Layth Sidiq. She also scored the 2015 short film, "Drifting", by Roee Messinger.

== Discography ==
=== As a leader ===
- Lullaby (with Noam Shacham, 2012)
- Tal y Tali (Casa Limón, 2014)
- Cybird (with Apollonio Maiello, 2021)

=== As a guest ===
With Javier Limón

- Promesas de Tierra (Casa Limón, 2013)
- Entre 20 Aguas: A La Música De Paco De Lucía (Casa Limón, 2015)
- Refugio Del Sonido (Casa Limón, 2016)
- OQ (IMG Artists, 2018)

With Alain Mallet

- Mutt Slang (ETrain, 2018)
- Mutt Slang 2 (Origin, 2020)

With David Broza

- En Casa Limón (S-Curve, 2020)

With Tonina

- Black Angel (Casa Limón, 2018)

With Wildes Holz

- Freunde (HOLZ, 2018)
