= John Kluge =

German and American entrepreneur (1914–2010)

John Kluge (1965)
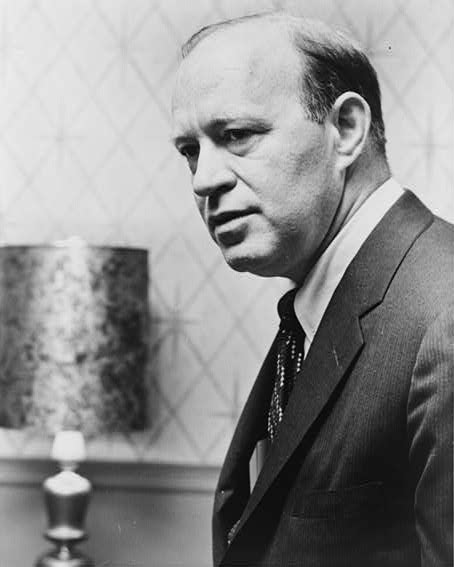
- Born: John Werner Kluge; September 21, 1914; Chemnitz, German Empire (today Chemnitz, Germany)
- Died: September 7, 2010 (aged 95); Charlottesville, Virginia, United States
- Education: Wayne State University; Columbia University (BA)
- Occupations: Chairman, Metromedia
- Spouses: Theodora Thomson Townsend; Yolanda Galardo Zucco; Patricia Maureen Rose; Maria Tussi Kuttner
- Children: 6, including John Kluge Jr.

John Werner Kluge (/ˈkluːɡi/; September 21, 1914 – September 7, 2010) was a German-American entrepreneur who became a television industry mogul in the United States. He was the founder and chairman of Metromedia. At one time he was the richest person in the U.S.

== Early life and education ==
Kluge was born in 1914 to a Presbyterian family in Chemnitz, Germany, and emigrated to the United States in 1922. Kluge went to Wayne State University for two years and earned his B.A. degree in economics from Columbia University in 1937. He was of Scots-Irish, English, and German heritage.

During World War II, Kluge served at the secret P.O. Box 1142 interrogation facility outside of Washington, D.C.

== Metromedia and Metromedia Company ==
Kluge's major move into media was by purchasing stock in the Metropolitan Broadcasting Corporation in the mid-1950s. The Metropolitan Broadcasting Corporation was the successor of the DuMont Television Network, which was spun off from DuMont Laboratories after the television network ceased operations in 1956. Metropolitan Broadcasting consisted of two stations, WABD in New York City and WTTG in Washington, D.C., both former DuMont stations by the time of Kluge's acquisition operating as independent stations. Kluge joined the company as its board chairman and largest stockholder in 1958, acquiring the bulk of his shares from founder Allen B. DuMont for about US$6,000,000.

After gaining control in 1959, Kluge began the company's expansion further into broadcasting, with holdings in television and radio. In the early 1960s, Kluge bought an outdoor advertising firm, and in 1961 the company's name was changed to Metromedia to reflect the diversity of its interests.

In 1986, Kluge sold the Metromedia television stations to 20th Century Fox (then controlled by News Corporation), for a reported US$4 billion (equivalent to $12 billion in 2025). Those stations would later form the core of what would become the Fox television network, (spun off from News Corporation/20th Century Fox with Fox Corporation decades later) which launched on October 9 of that year. The following year, Forbes placed Kluge at the top of its list as the richest man in America.

In retaliation for a lawsuit brought by Paul Winchell, who sought the rights to his children's television program, "Winchell-Mahoney Time", Metromedia management, under orders from Kluge, destroyed the video tapes. Winchell was later awarded nearly $18 million as compensation for Metromedia's capricious behavior.

Following the Fox disposal, Kluge's activities had been carried out through a private venture named Metromedia Company in which he was a partner with Stuart Subotnick. Metromedia's more recent activities have included Eastern European, Commonwealth of Independent States and China telecom/cable/radio ventures through Metromedia International Group and the ill-fated US telecom backbone operation Metromedia Fiber Network. In July 2008, the Metromedia Restaurant Group, part of the Metromedia Company, closed over 300 company-owned Bennigan's and Steak and Ale restaurants. Kluge and partner Stuart Subotnick were also the original team operators of the New York/New Jersey MetroStars Major League Soccer franchise.

== Philanthropy ==
=== John W. Kluge Center ===
In celebration of the 200th Anniversary of the Library of Congress, Kluge donated an unprecedented $60 million to create the John W. Kluge Center at the Library of Congress. It was created as an academic center where accomplished senior scholars and junior post-doctoral fellows might gather to make use of the Library's incomparable collections and to interact with members of the United States Congress. In addition, his gift would establish a $1 million prize to be given in recognition of a lifetime of achievement in the human sciences, comparable to the Nobel Prize in literature and economics. The Kluge Prize would honor lifetime intellectual achievement in the same way as the Kennedy Center Honors recognize lifetime achievement in the performing arts.

=== Columbia University ===
Kluge gave over $510 million to Columbia University. Acknowledging the scholarship funds that enabled him to attend, Kluge gave more than $110 million to Columbia University between 1987 and 1993, primarily to endow financial aid for undergraduates from underprivileged backgrounds. His donations also help many of these students pursue PhDs after they graduate by financing their doctoral studies. On April 11, 2007, Columbia University's President Lee C. Bollinger announced a $400 million pledge from Kluge, which the university was to receive upon the donor's death. The donation marks the fourth largest gift to an institution of higher learning in America, all designated for financial aid. This marks the largest pledge ever devoted exclusively to student aid to any single institution of higher education in the United States.

=== University of Virginia ===
In December 1997, John Kluge gifted the bulk of his world-class collection of Aboriginal Australian art to the University of Virginia. The gift led the University of Virginia to found the Kluge-Ruhe Aboriginal Art Museum, the only museum in the United States dedicated to the research and presentation of Aboriginal Australian art and culture.

In 2001, Kluge donated his 7,378-acre (29.86 km^{2}) estate in Albemarle County, Virginia to the University of Virginia. The estate, valued in excess of $45 million, was the second-largest gift in the university's history at the time. UVa has been holding classes and seminars in the various buildings and on the grounds of Morven Farm in an effort to incorporate the land grant into their various course offerings. Many developments are in the works to improve the farm and make it part of the landscape of Charlottesville.

In 2009, he donated $3 million to the university to foster end-of-life compassion.

=== Political contributions ===
Through the 1980s he gave donations to both Republican and Democratic presidential candidates and to Senate candidates in various states. In Virginia he mainly gave to Democrats. In 1986, he gave $75,000 to the state Democratic Leadership Council, and in 1989 he donated $100,000 to gubernatorial candidate L. Douglas Wilder.

== Personal life ==
Kluge was a collector of contemporary Indigenous Australian art, and owned works by prominent artists including Clifford Possum Tjapaltjarri.

In 1983, Kluge received the Golden Plate Award of the American Academy of Achievement.

Kluge was married four times. His first wife was Theodora Thomson Townsend, his second was Yolanda Galardo Zucco, his third was Patricia Maureen Rose, and his fourth was Maria Tussi Kuttner. Patricia Kluge kept their Albemarle estate in the 1990 divorce settlement converting it into an award-winning vineyard and winery which opened in 1999. She took out $65 million in loans and mortgaged the mansion to finance production expansion and a related real-estate venture, but defaulted and declared bankruptcy in 2011.

Kluge had three children, Joseph (whom he adopted), Samantha (with Zucco) and John Jr. (adopted, with Rose). Samantha later married technology executive Adam Cahan, however that marriage was later annulled. He also had three step children who remained a part of his life until his death: Diane, Jeannette Brophy and Peter Lockwood Townsend. He had homes in New Rochelle, New York, Virginia and Palm Beach, Florida with his fourth wife, Maria Tussi Kluge, at the time of his death in 2010.

== See also ==
- The World's Billionaires
- List of richest Americans in history

Honorary titles
Preceded by Sam Walton	America's richest person October 23, 1989 – 1990	Succeeded by Sam Walton
