= Lala Tamar =

Lala Tamar لآلة تمر ללח תמר
- Born: Tamar Bloch
- Origin: Morocco; Brazil
- Genres: Sephardic Music; World Music; Moroccan pop
- Occupations: Singer, musician, songwriter
- Instruments: Vocals, gambri, qraqeb
- Label: Tigmi Records
- Member of: Andelucious
- Formerly of: Z'aaluk, Ancient Groove
- Website: www.lalamusiclala.com

Lala Tamar (Hebrew: ללה תמר, Arabic: لآلة تمر); is a Sephardic singer-songwriter born in Israel that is now based in Essauouira, Morocco. Her self-titled debut album, Lala Tamar, was the first contemporary album ever to be recorded completely in Ḥaketía. She writes and records music in the languages pertaining to her heritage, including Moroccan Arabic, Haketia, Tamazight, and Brazilian Portuguese. She has done tours in several countries, including Morocco, Portugal, Spain, and the United States.

== Discography ==
=== Albums ===
- Lala Tamar (2020)
- Duo Andalus (with Ofer Ronen, 2024)
- BAB SBA3 (2026)

=== EPs ===
- Qouli (with Ofer Ronen, 2024)
- Aliza (with Kutiman, Dekel, and Ouzo Bazooka, 2024)

=== Singles ===
- "Bellida" (2019)
- "A Lala Ya Lalla" (2020)
- "Kappara" (2020)
- "שירת המסכות" (2020)
- "Et Dodim Kala" (with 12 Tribes Music, 2022)
- "Ana Atchata [Live] (feat. Yamdah Salam Mnat Aichata, 2022)
- "Achkid Aylli" (2025)
- "Dak lHbib" (feat. Khadija El Warzazia, 2026)
- “Fkhyali” (2026)
- “Pão Com Manteiga” (feat. Bia Ferreira, 2026)

=== Guest Performances ===
- "Saravá" (by Saravá, 2020)
- "We are one" (by Ady Sun, 2021)
- "Power is out (Hit the Road Mix)" (by Cable Street Collective, 2021)
- "Y'a Banti" (by Buddha Bar & Amine K, 2022)
- "Childhood at Namouche Studios" (by Mahfoud, 2024)
- "Saravá" (by Saravá, 2024)
- "Cinema Riff" (by Ya Ani, 2024)
