= Sabbo and Kuti =

Israeli musical artist

Sabbo & Kuti סבו וקוטי
- Origin: Tel Aviv, Israel
- Genres: Reggae, hip hop, baile funk

Sabbo & Kuti (aka Kutiman) are a production duo working together on side projects from their independently successful careers. Working together to mix various styles of music from hip-hop to funk to reggae, Sabbo & Kuti have established explored mixing and mastering in various projects.

The pair won the ACUM Award 2010 for their production and arrangement on prominent soul/funk/reggae singer Karolina's album "What Do I Do Now?".

Their most recent project "Better Days" is a reggae compilation the two created while traveling in Jamaica in 2004. Featuring artists such as Turbulence. Norris Man, and Milton Blake, "Better Days" is set to be independently released in May 2011.

== Projects ==
- Karolina - What Do I Do Now? (2010)
- Better Days (2011)
