= Habanot Nechama =

Israeli folk band

Habanot Nechama הַבָּנוֹת נֶחָמָה
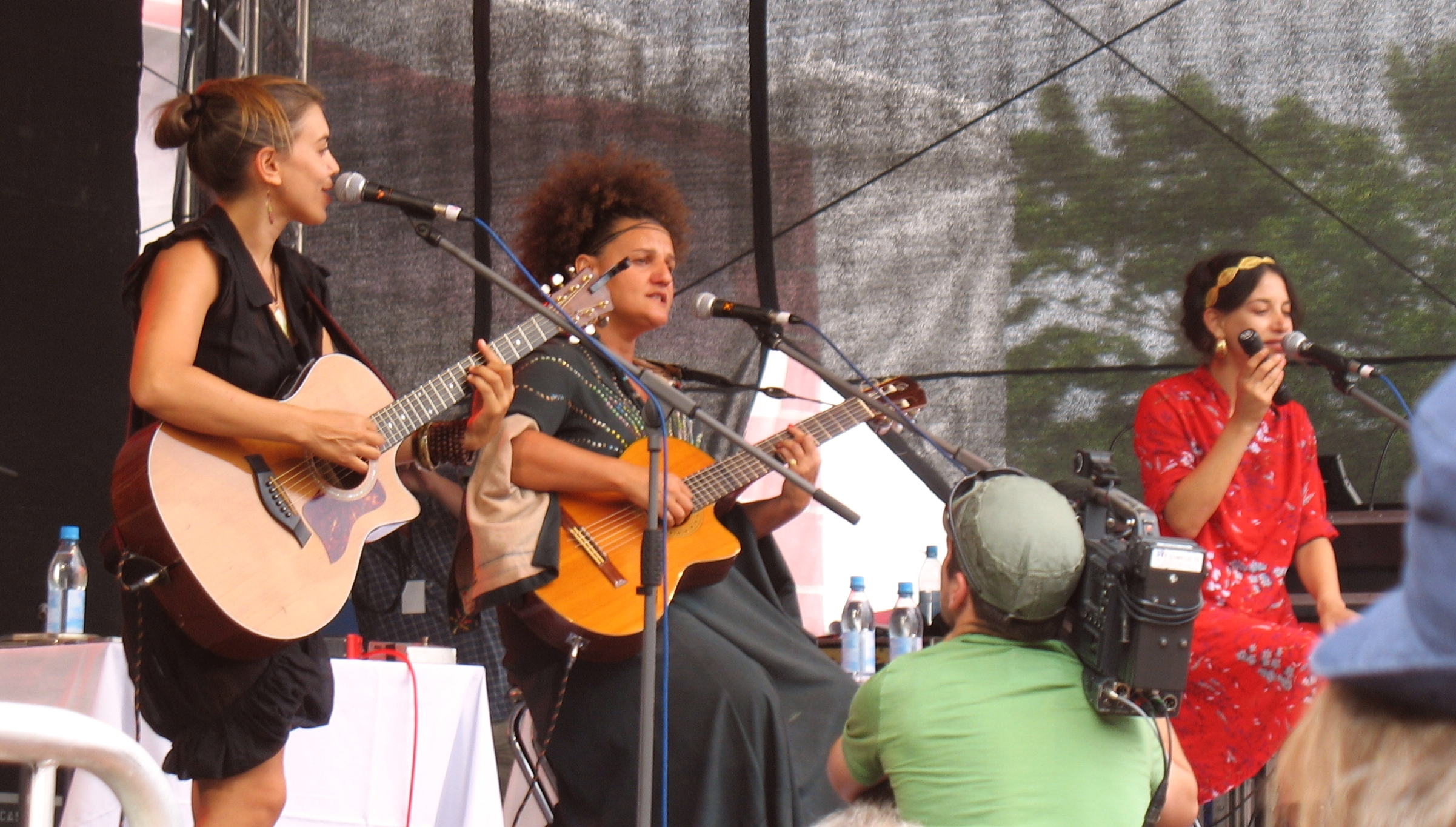
- Performing at Rudolstadt 2009 Roots Folk World Music Festival

Background information
- Origin: Israel
- Genres: Folk, soul, funk
- Years active: 2004-present
- Labels: Labeleh Records
- Members: Karolina Avratz; Dana Adini; Yael Deckelbaum

Habanot Nechama (Hebrew: הַבָּנוֹת נֶחָמָה, "The Comfort Girls" or "The Daughters of Consolation") is an Israeli folk band. The group is composed of three female vocalists: Karolina, Dana Adini, and Yael Deckelbaum.

They are best known for their self-titled, debut album which went platinum (over 40,000 records sold) in Israel, and their hit song So Far.

== History ==
Habanot Nechama was formed in 2004 in Tel Aviv, Israel. They met each other in a local clothing store where they vented their frustrations with their careers and they decided to form the band shortly thereafter. Karolina named the band Habanot Nechama (translated into English as "The Comfort Girls") for the peace of mind that working with each other gave them.

Their self-titled, debut album was released in August 2007 in Israel, where it became a gold record in three weeks and platinum soon after. The album has songs in both Hebrew and English. Their sound was described as "reggae-soul-folk". After the album's success, the girls took their act on the road, touring throughout Israel and performing at several Europe summer festivals and finally to the United States, where they performed at the Radio City Music Hall and the Kodak Theatre for Israel's 60th birthday

== Discography ==
Title	Year	Label
Habanot Nechama	2007	Helicon Records

== Awards ==
- Best New Act - Israeli Music Channel Awards (nominated)
- Act of the Year - DJ Ha'ir magazine
- Song of the Year, So Far - ACUM awards (Israeli ASCAP awards)

== Solo projects ==
All three members of Habanot Nechama have other projects outside of their band activity. Karolina has performed with Lauryn Hill, The Black Eyed Peas and Erykah Badu in Israel and started her own solo album. Dana Adini is an actress best known for her role on the Israeli cult show, Hashir Shelanu and in 2007, CMJ chose her to perform at their "music marathon" in New York. Yael Deckelbaum is in another band called Yael and the Palm Trees that performs regularly in Tel Aviv. They are in talks to release a second Habanot Nechama album.
