= Karolina (singer) =

Israeli singer-songwriter

Karolina קרולינה
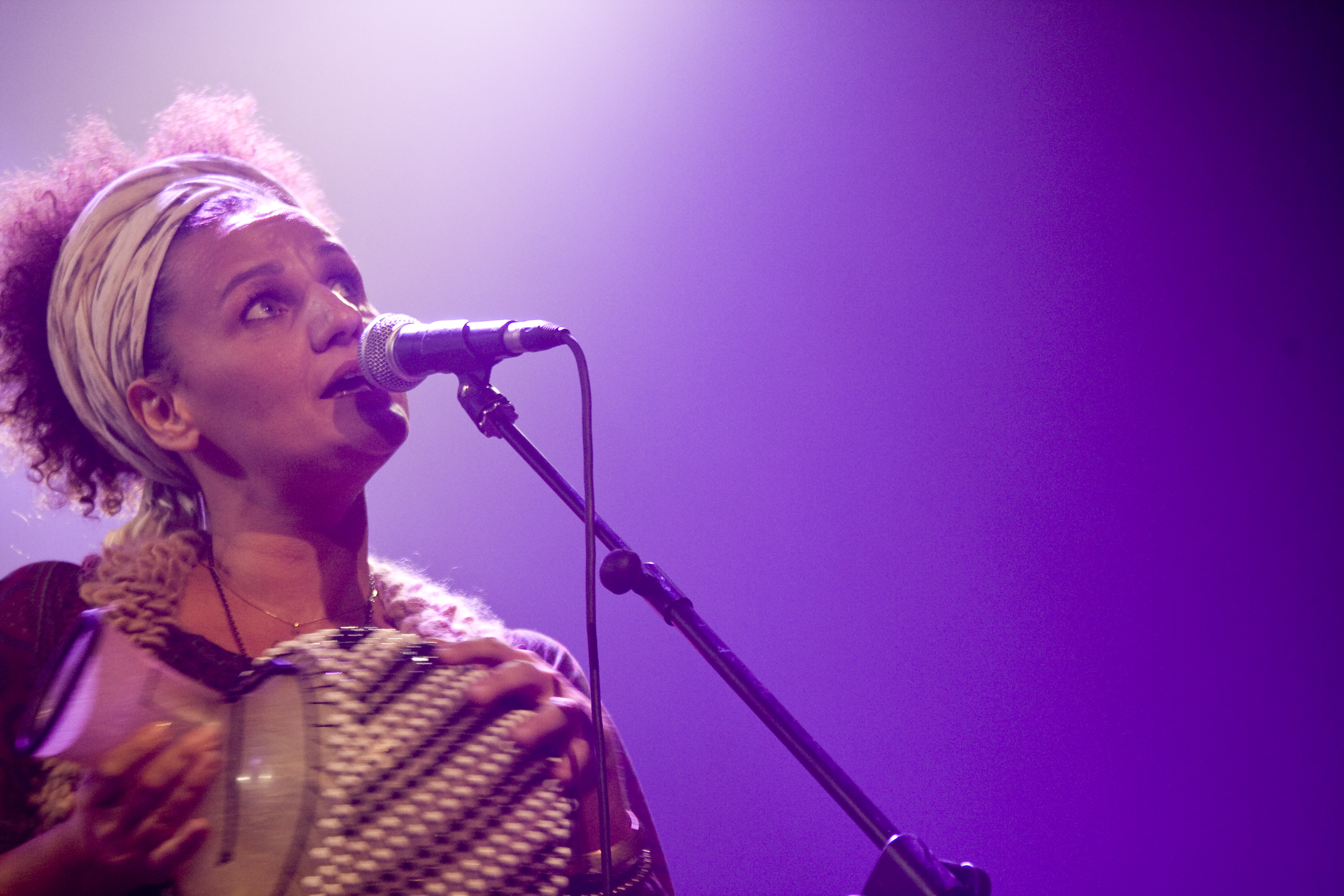
- Karolina performing in 2007

Background information
- Born: Keren Avratz; March 19, 1971 (age 54); Jaffa, Israel
- Genres: Rock; Soul; Pop
- Years active: 1999–present
- Formerly of: Habanot Nechama
- Website: https://www.karolina.co.il/

Keren "Karolina" Avratz (Hebrew: קרן "קרולינה" אברץ; March 19, 1971), professionally known as Karolina, is a singer-songwriter from Eilat, Israel. She is the lead singer of the trio Habanot Nechama.

== Biography ==
Keren (Karolina) Avratz was born in Jaffa and raised in Eilat. Given the nickname "Karolina" by her grandmother, Karolina's musical influences came primarily from within her household, as well as from attending the Red Sea Jazz Festival. She listened to Greek, Arabic, Turkish and other music on a daily basis. Her brother, Joseph Avratz, introduced her to soul, jazz and new wave music, and she collaborated with another brother, Shlomi Avratz, in his project Madbooja. After a few lessons in classical guitar at the age of fifteen, she studied on her own.

== Music career ==
At the beginning of her recording career, in 1999, Karolina recorded a track with Spoiled and Zigo under her given name "Keren". Later creating "MC Karolina" a concept project that initially focused on a solo sound system shows for the club scene. This project led to multiple recordings with various artists.

In 2000, Karolina founded Funset with musicians in Tel Aviv (bass: Uri Kleinman, keyboards: Shaul Eshet, drums: Atraf Moshe Assraf, dj: Yoav Rattner, sound: Guy Margalit, guitar: Shai Pertz). In 2004, she was invited by Israeli producers crew "Soulico" to record "Lo Tzipity" - an Israeli version of a track called "It's a Pity" originally released by Tanya Stephens and Seeed. Intending for the track to just be for fun, it eventually became a top 5 hit on the airwaves even though it was never officially released.

That same year Karolina formed a trio, Habanot Nechama, with Yael Deckelbaum and Dana Adini. Their debut was an acoustic night at the Jah-Pan club in the Florentin neighborhood in south Tel Aviv.

In 2005, Funset released their first album, a combination of Reggae, Nu Soul, and live Trip-hop. The album, called Ragga Pumpkin received an award from the ACUM for composition.

Karolina continued to be featured on compilations and tracks, including the single Music is Ruling My World with Kutiman. In 2007, Habanot Nechama released its debut album, which went platinum in Israel and the track So Far, written and composed by Karolina, won her second ACUM award for "Best New Song of 2007".

Karolina's solo album “What Shall I Do Now?” (December 2009) which won an ACUM for its producing by Sabbo and Kutiman, blends rock, groove, funk, and soul. The first three singles released from this album, including “Happiness” and “Nobody is Coming for Me”, have been Top 3 radio hits in Israeli, and the album has been a number one seller in Israel since its release.

== Musical collaboration ==
Along with performing with Funset and Habanot Nechama, Karolina has worked with other musicians, both Israeli and international. She has collaborated with Soulico, Kutiman and DJ Sabbo in Israel. In 2007, Karolina opened for The Black Eyed Peas as a solo acoustic set & for Lauryn Hill that same year. In 2008 Karolina joined bass player Yossi Fine, Sabbo and Kutiman to open for Erykah Badu. In 2010 Karolina and Kutiman created a music video for her single "Smile 2 Me" that has been placed on display at Hammer Museum in Los Angeles for the Flux Screening Series. Karolina also performed with Ziggy Marley in Israel on his tour in 2011.

== Discography ==
- Funset - Ragga Pumpkin, CD, 2005 (Nana Music, IL)
- LO TZIPITI, Single, 2005
- Polar Pair featuring Karolina – Over My Head. 12”, 2005 (Tru Thoughts, UK)
- Kutiman featuring Karolina – Music is Ruling My World. 12”, 2007 (Melting Pot Music, Germany)
- Habanot Nechama – Self Titled. CD, 2007 (Labeleh, IL)
- Funset – No Blame (from Best Seven Selections 2). CD, 2007 (Sonar Kollektiv, Germany)
- Yaya featuring Karolina – Soon. Single, 2007 (Hed Arzi, IL)
- Funset – Bring It Out (from cooking music). Mix CD, 2007 (Honey Apple, IL)
- Kutiman featuring Karolina – Losing It; Trumpet Woman; Music is Ruling My World (From Kutiman, self-titled). CD & LP, 2007 (Melting Pot Music, Germany)
- Karolina – Yom Bo Yakum (from Avoda Ivrit) 2008 (Avoda Ivrit, IL)
- Karolina - "What Will I Do Now?" CD, 2009 (B.M.usic, Israel)
- Karolina - "Zohar" - CD 2012
- Karolina - "Shalosh" - CD 2017

== See also ==
- Music in Israel
