= Kutiman =

Israeli musical artist

Kutiman קותימן
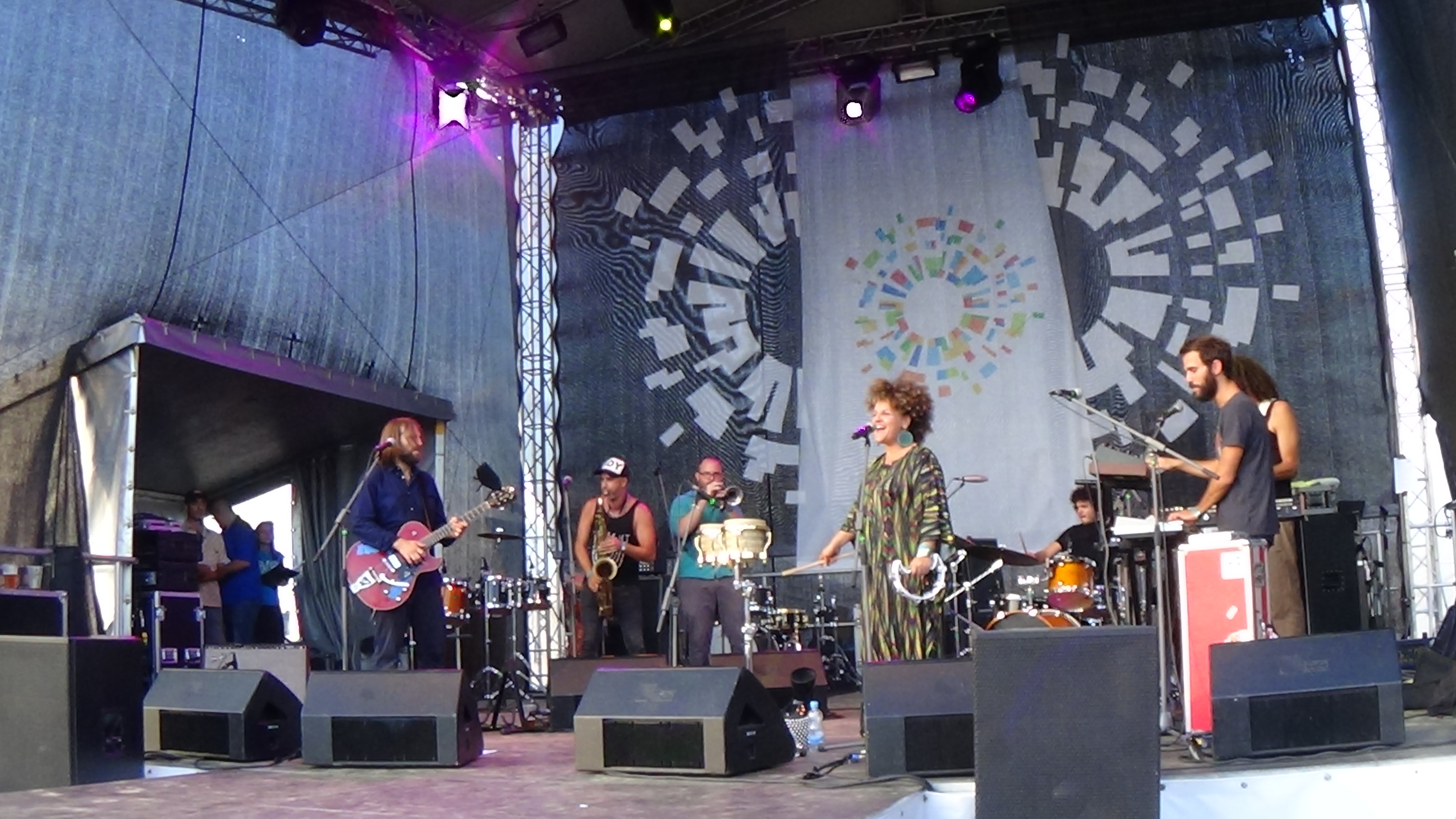
- The Kutiman Orchestra performing in Riga in 2014

Background information
- Born: Ophir Kutiel; 21 April 1982 (age 44)
- Origin: Jerusalem, Israel
- Genres: funk, jazz, house, electronica, experimental, afro beat, psychedelic
- Occupations: Musician, producer, video artist, animator
- Instruments: drums, keyboard, guitar, bass
- Years active: 2006–present
- Label: Indie
- Website: www.youtube.com/kutiman

Ophir Kutiel (Hebrew: אופיר קותיאל; born April 21, 1982), professionally known as Kutiman (Hebrew: קותימן), is an Israeli musician, composer, producer and animator. He is best known for creating the online music video project, ThruYOU, a self-titled album, and the viral ongoing series "Thru the City" including his "Mix Tel Aviv" piece, which went viral on YouTube.

== Background ==
Kutiel was born in Jerusalem, Israel, and grew up in Zichron Yaacov. He commenced piano lessons at the age of six and learned to play drums and guitar at 14. When Kutiel was 18, he moved to Tel Aviv to study jazz at Rimon Music College.

While working at a convenience store in Tel Aviv, Kutiel discovered a college radio station that was playing genres of music that were vastly different from the classical jazz he was accustomed to. Following this experience, Kutiman met Sabbo, another Israeli artist, who introduced him to Afrobeat and funk music, including the sounds of James Brown and Fela Kuti, among many others. As Kutiel's taste for music deviated from his traditional training, in 2003, Kutiman embarked on a journey to Jamaica, where he researched reggae and worked with Stephen and Damien Marley.

== Music career ==
In 2006, Kutiman signed to German music label, Melting Pot Music, based in Cologne. Soon after, his first single, "No Groove Where I Come From", was released, followed by the release of the hit song "Music is Ruling My World"—a collaboration with Karolina of Habanot Nechama. Kutiman's eponymous debut album, which received an 8.2 rating from Pitchfork Media and a 7 out of 10 from PopMatters, was released in the fall of 2007. Under the Radar picked Kutiman as one of the "Artists to Watch in 2008", along with Glasvegas and MGMT. Kutiman has also won the 2010 ACUM Prize for producing Karolina's album What Will I Do Now?

In the summer of 2010, Kutiman co-headlined a concert bill with DJ Shadow in Tel Aviv, performing with his live band, The Kutiman Orchestra.

In June 2012 Kutiman released a single and video clip, "Dover. D". This video, created by Kutiman, documents a street art project by Dover D. Kutiman produced this song and played all instruments, featuring Elran Dekel, lead singer of Funk'n'stein, on vocals. This song was featured on Gilles Peterson's BBC Radio 6 Music show

In 2014, Kutiman was nominated for a Webby Award in the Video Remix/Mashup category for his 'Thru Tokyo' project, in which he created an intimate musical landscape for the city of Tokyo. He has since been commissioned by various cities such as Jerusalem, Tel Aviv, Riga, Krakow, and New York to create audio/visual portraits of each city's uniqueness.

Following the success of 'Thru You,' Kutiman released 'Thru You Too' in October 2014, an online music album composed of unrelated YouTube videos. He was awarded a 2015 Webby Honoree for his work on 'Thru You Too'. This project led to collaborations with some of the world's most prominent producers, DJs, and musicians for the 'Thru You Remixes'. It featured nine producers, representing different genres and countries: Garden City Movement, Mixmonster & Kalbata, Jim Dunloop & Grzly Adams, Rejoicer, Free The Robots, Red Axes, Tomgi, La Dame Noir and Copia Doble Systema.

In July 2015, Kutiman released Space Cassava, a two-track vinyl featuring deep jazz and funk. The EP served as a soft launch for Kutiman's label, Siyal Music. The official launch of the label kicked off with the release of Kutiman's sophomore album 6AM in June 2016. The eight track album features a more psychedelic sound.

Shortly after the release of "6am" in July 2016, Kutiman was nominated and won the Vibe Israel & Shorty Story award for "Outstanding Content Creator in Israel".

=== "Thru You" (2009) ===
In 2009, Kutiman released "Thru You," an online music video project, featuring a mixture of samples of YouTube videos, and the video project received more than 10 million views in around two weeks. Time Magazine named it one of the "50 Best Inventions of 2009". Due to the success of Thru You, in October 2010, Kutiman was invited by YouTube to perform at the "YouTube Play" grand opening at the Solomon R. Guggenheim Museum in New York City.

Two years after the release of Thru You, Kutiman created a new Thru You-like video, titled My Favorite Color, subsequently attracting the attention of numerous publications, including Wired, Fader, and Mashable, the latter awarding the piece its "Video of the Day" accolade. In a June 2009 Internet radio interview, Kutiman described how he first conceived of Thru You:

At first I took some drummers -- before I had the idea about Thru You, I took some drummers from YouTube and I played on top of them -- just for fun, you know. And then one day, just before I plugged in my guitar to play on top of a drummer from YouTube, I thought to myself, you know, maybe I can find a bass and guitar and other players on YouTube to play with this drummer...

Kutiman spent two months working on the Thru You project, and, as Kutiman described:

It took me two months, but it was really intense. I barely ate, I just worked on a computer and went to sleep...day and night, and night and day...didn't see any friends, no family...not even the sun.

After disclosing his work to only 20 friends, Kutiman's project spread virally across the web, racking up more than one million views in less than a week. After viewing Thru You, open source advocate, Lawrence Lessig, praised the project for pioneering a new, less-regulated form of media, stating, "If you come to the Net armed with the idea that the old system of copyright is going to work just fine here, this more than anything is going to get you to recognize: you need some new ideas."

Kutiman did not often travel to promote his project but on 19 June 2009, he visited Wrocław, Poland, responding to an invitation from an online radio station. In an interview, Kutiman described the interest of various media outlets in the Thru You project, as well as his own willingness to focus on his work:

I got a lot of offers, you know, for gigs and for DJing and for just interviews, but I really do my best, you know. I don't really like it, honestly – but you're so nice and kind, so I'm having a great time.

=== "Thru You Too" ===
On 12 September 2014 Kutiman released "Give It Up", a first video from the sequel project entitled "Thru You Too". The "Give It Up" gained over a million views in a matter of days. The "Thru You Too" included six female vocalists as the center of the album. On 23 September the second video "No One In This World" was released and a week later the rest of the videos were released on Kutiman's YouTube channel and a companion site was launched. The new project was covered by many international media outlets such as Slate TIME Magazine, Billboard Magazine, and The New York Times.

=== "Thru You Too Remixes" ===
In 2015, Kutiman's popular Thru You Too album was remixed and released as an online album in the form of a website. A quest to capture Thru You Too's profound impact led to an original collaboration with A-list international producers who each give their own personal interpretation of the Thru You Too tracks. The international producers each represent a different country and musical style, such as hip hop, big beat, house, dub, and electropop. The project was released as an online album with an original website.

== Video mashups ==
=== Kutiman mixes Maroon 5: "My Favorite Color" ===
The "My Favorite Color" project blends together a deeper, jazz-oriented sound that earned positive reviews from outlets such as Wired, CBS News, and TechCrunch. The video maintains the ThruYou style of using various YouTube video clips to form a single compilation, but the sound is more complex and dreamlike. "My Favorite Color" features many different clips, including an organ-playing mother, a young vocalist singing in her London bedroom, and an Omaha-based saxophonist performing a free improvisation.

=== My Favorite Band: A Tribute to "Black Dog" by Led Zeppelin ===
Paying tribute to the influential band Led Zeppelin, Kutiman created a piece entitled "My Favorite Band"—it became the first user-generated "mashup" video cover of its song "Black Dog". Using unrelated YouTube videos of various musicians performing "Black Dog", Kutiman mixed the clips together to create an innovative cover version. Kutiman's tribute to Led Zeppelin was screened at Flatpack Film Festival as part of the "Home of Metal" celebrations. The screening occurred in Wolverhampton, UK, close to an area frequented by Led Zeppelin.

=== This Is Real Democracy ===
In 2011, Kutiman released his video, "This Is Real Democracy". The video's intention is to raise awareness by using footage of people demonstrating in the streets and of world leaders (past and present); the video is Kutiman's attempt to address and respond to events that were broadcast through other social media feeds. Although some of the video sequences were harvested from YouTube, they mostly originate from a traditional media source, official TV stations, a new element in Kutiman's work.

Kutiman generally refrains from making overtly political statements and speculations were raised regarding the title of the piece; discussions asked if "This is Real Democracy" was a reference to Mubarak, Netanyahu, Cameron and Sarkozy; or if it was in reference to the unleashed power of the people as they marched, protested, revolted or rioted.

=== Off Grid ===
Kutiman released Off Grid on February 11, 2016, as an online album consisting of 96 unrelated YouTube clips. The project pays homage to free jazz and psychedelic music. Its release was accompanied by a website: Kutiman.com.

On September 20, 2016, Kutiman premiered his Off Grid exhibit at the Tel Aviv Museum of Art. The project was also featured in Ron Arad's Curtain Call installation in London and Singapore. In July 2017, Off Grid arrived at the Contemporary Jewish Museum in San Francisco.

== Thru the City (ongoing series) ==
=== Thru Jerusalem ===
In June 2011, Kutiman was chosen as the Artist of the Season for The Jerusalem Season of Culture, and he created the video "Thru Jerusalem". This piece differs from his past mixes, as he himself approached and shot the musicians, rather than finding them on YouTube. Although Kutiman filmed the musicians himself, he did not provide any guidance or direction as they played and mixed the footage himself. In July 2011, the song won First Prize in the global Call for Music Videos of Palestinian-Jewish Duos or Groups presented by the Jewish-Palestinian Living Room Dialogue.

=== Thru Krakow ===
In 2012 Kutiman was invited by the Jewish Culture Festival to Kraków, Poland and created second clip in his Thru series—"Thru Krakow"—featuring many festival artists, including: Frank London, David Krakauer, Uri Caine, Paul Shapiro, cantor Benzion Miller, Raphael Roginski, Mikołaj Trzaska, DJ Funklore (Tomasz Jurecki) and the Alaev Family.

=== Thru Tokyo ===
In August 2012, Kutiman was invited to shoot and record traditional and modern Tokyo, Japan-based musicians and artists to create Thru Tokyo. The video was released in 2013. Thru Tokyo is the third video in the "Thru the City" series, following the successful Thru Jerusalem and Thru Kraków.

The project was a collaboration with PBS, which broadcast the footage exclusively on its YouTube channel.

=== Thru Tel Aviv ===
Following Thru Tokyo, Kutiman teamed up with The British Council and The Space to create Thru Tel Aviv. Mix the City invites people all over the world to create their own interpretation of Tel Aviv. Kutiman recorded a four-minute YouTube video of musicians that represent the diverse voices of Tel Aviv including Acre-born Palestinian musician Ziwar Bahlul.

The release of the video was accompanied by the interactive website Mix the City.

== Music videos ==
In addition to Kutiman's audiovisual collages, for which he has composed the music, Kutiman has also directed music videos.

Kutiman's first video was an animated music video created for his song, "Chaser", from his debut album. Kutiman's second animated music video was for Hadag Nahash's "Eze Kif".

== Film: Presenting Princess Shaw ==
In 2015, Magnolia Pictures alongside director Ido Haar debuted Presenting Princess Shaw, the true story of Samantha Montgomery aka Princess Shaw, an aspiring musician, and artist from New Orleans who Kutiman discovered. The film received positive reviews from New York Times, Rotten Tomatoes, and Rolling Stone.

On September 22, 2016, Presenting Princess Shaw won the Israeli Academy Award (known as the Ophir Awards) for "Best Documentary." Kutiman and Princess Shaw did a live performance together at the ceremony.

== Discography ==
- No Groove Where I Come From 7" (Afro Kats) October 2006
- No Groove Where I Come From! 12" (MPM) November 2006
- No Reason For You 12" (MPM) March 2007
- Music Is Ruling My World (w/ remix by DJ Day) 12" (MPM) June 2007
- Kutiman CD/LP (MPM) November 2007
- Dover D (B.M.usic) June 2012
- Space Cassava 12" (Siyal Music) July 2015
- "6 AM" (Siyal Music) CD/LP June 2016
- "White Monkey" (Siyal Music) 7" April 2017
- "Dont Hold Onto The Clouds" (Siyal Music) cassette/LP July 2018
- "Antarctia" (Siyal Music) February 2019
- "Wachaga" (Siyal Music) digital/LP/CD July 2020
- "Kutiman Presents Dekel: Organic Portals" (KPM Music Ltd) [w/ DEKEL] January 2022
- "Open" digital/LP/CD 2022
- "Dense" (Siyal Music) May 2023
- "Aliza" (Siyal Music) [w/ Aliza, DEKEL, Ouzo Bazooka, & Lala Tamar], September 2024
- "Work in Progress" (Siyal Music) [w/ Work in Progress & Tomer Yosef], December 2024
- "Dreams in Aspamia" (Siyal Music) July 2025
- Hope (Siyal Music) [w/ DEKEL] May 2026
