= Aya Korem =

Israeli musician (born 1980)

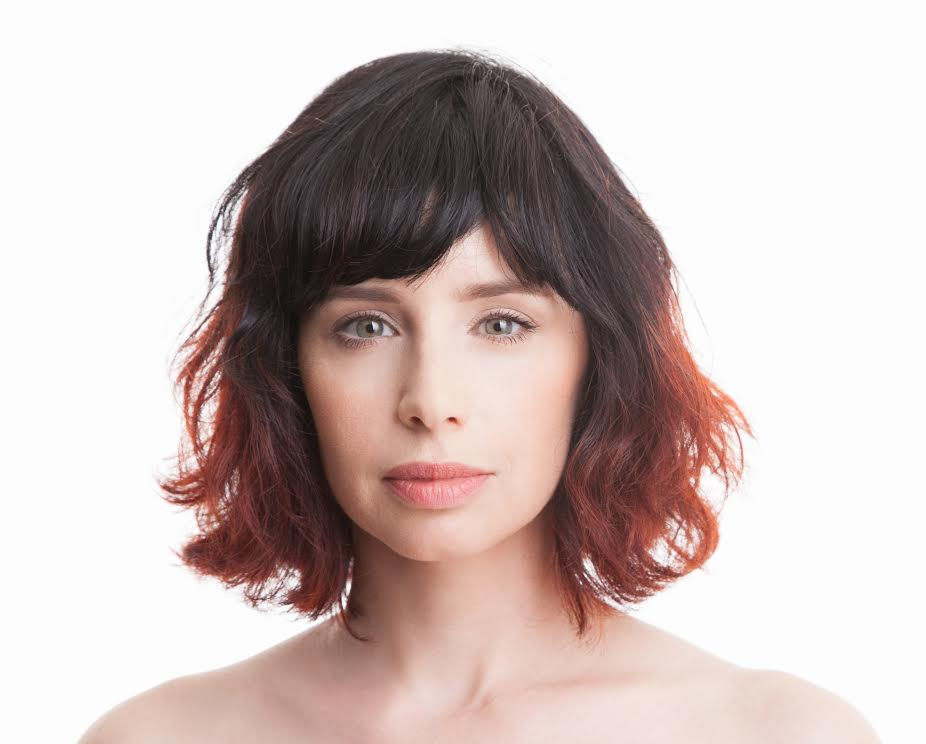

Background information
- Born: 7 January 1980 (age 46); Nof HaGalil
- Origin: Nazareth Ilit, Israel
- Genres: Pop; rock
- Occupations: Singer; songwriter
- Years active: 2006–present
- Label: Independent
- Website: www.ayakorem.co.il

Aya Korem (Hebrew: אַיָּה כּוֹרֵם; born 7 January 1980) is an Israeli pop and rock singer and songwriter.

== Biography ==
Aya Korem was born in Nazareth Ilit and spent her childhood there. After she graduated high school, she served as a tank instructor at the IDF's Armored Corps.

Since childhood Korem has been singing and performing, playing the guitar and the piano. Between 2001 and 2004, she studied Songwriting, Composition and Performance at the Rimon School of Jazz and Contemporary Music in Ramat HaSharon, a school that gave birth to many Israeli singers such as Noa and Aviv Geffen. She was part of the "magic class", studying together with Miri Mesika, Keren Peles, Ohad Hitman and Eric Berman that went on to be popular singers. She enrolled in the music college just to "pass some time" until she decided what she really wanted to study, but ended up having a successful music career. She dreamed of being an architect, and one of her temporary jobs was cake baking at a bakery.

Aya Korem lives in Tel Aviv.

== Music career ==
Korem started her music career as a songwriter. Her first public exposure was the song Ata af Pa'am (אתה אף פעם, "You Will Never"), released in the first album of Miri Mesika in April 2005 and a theme song she wrote and performed for a TV show called "Hama'arehet". Only after receiving compliments for her voice did she decide to also become a singer and started working on her own album.

In 2006 Korem released her debut album, Aya Korem. It was produced by Ori Zakh, a close friend and Miri Mesika's husband, a Rimon graduate who also produced both Miri Mesika's albums and Ohad Hitman's first album. The work on the album's songs began already during Aya's studies. In February 2006 the first single was released, Kayitz (קיץ, "Summer")—a song of hope for a lover that would come one day "like summer". The second single from the album, Shir Ahava Pashut (שיר אהבה פשוט, "Simple Love Song") was released in March 2006, reached No. 1 on the Reshet Gimel chart and came 4th in the Song of the Year competition. Later came Klipa (קליפה, "Peel"), Yonatan Shapira (יונתן שפירא), BeSof HaLayla (בסוף הלילה, "At the end of the night"), Ata Zorem Etzli BaDam (אתה זורם אצלי בדם, "You Are Flowing in My Blood") and HaShir shel Itay (השיר של איתי, "Itay's Song"). The album features mostly songs written by Korem herself.

"Yonatan Shapira", which Korem wrote as an assignment to write a song about a job announcement, is a humorous love song for a pilot Aya met during her studies in Rimon, one of the signers of the pilots' letter. According to Aya Korem, Yonatan Shapira was not pleased with the song, but living abroad, did not suffer much from the consequences.

Korem received the Golden Album award, which was presented to her on her 27th birthday party. The album sold about 30,000 copies. Korem recorded videos for some of the songs and went on a 1.5-year performance tour. At the beginning she performed with a band, but after taking part in a piano festival in the end of 2006, she switched to more intimate gigs, performing with a piano and a cello only.

Having yet about 70 songs unpublished, Aya Korem released her second album, Safa Zara (שפה זרה, "Foreign Language"), on 28 February 2008. The album included songs she wrote at the age of 26–27 and has jazz, cabaret and country influences. The lyrics deal with a wider range of subjects than those of the first album. The first single, HaSof shel HaSipur (הסוף של הסיפור, "The End of the Story"), is a sad love song co-written by Aya Korem and Eric Berman. The single was released in December 2007. In February 2008 Al Ta'amini (אל תאמיני, "Do Not Believe") was released. The lyrics of Al Ta'amini talk about the fleeting condition of a celebrity in the popular culture. "And then somebody will say: 'your time is over, and now let someone else take the stage'", wrote Korem. The song was inspired by Janis Ian's song Stars, which is even credited in the liner notes of the album. Two more songs from this album have been released as singles: Otobiografia (אוטוביוגרפיה, "Autobiography") and Akhshav Kazot (עכשיו כזאת, "Now like This").

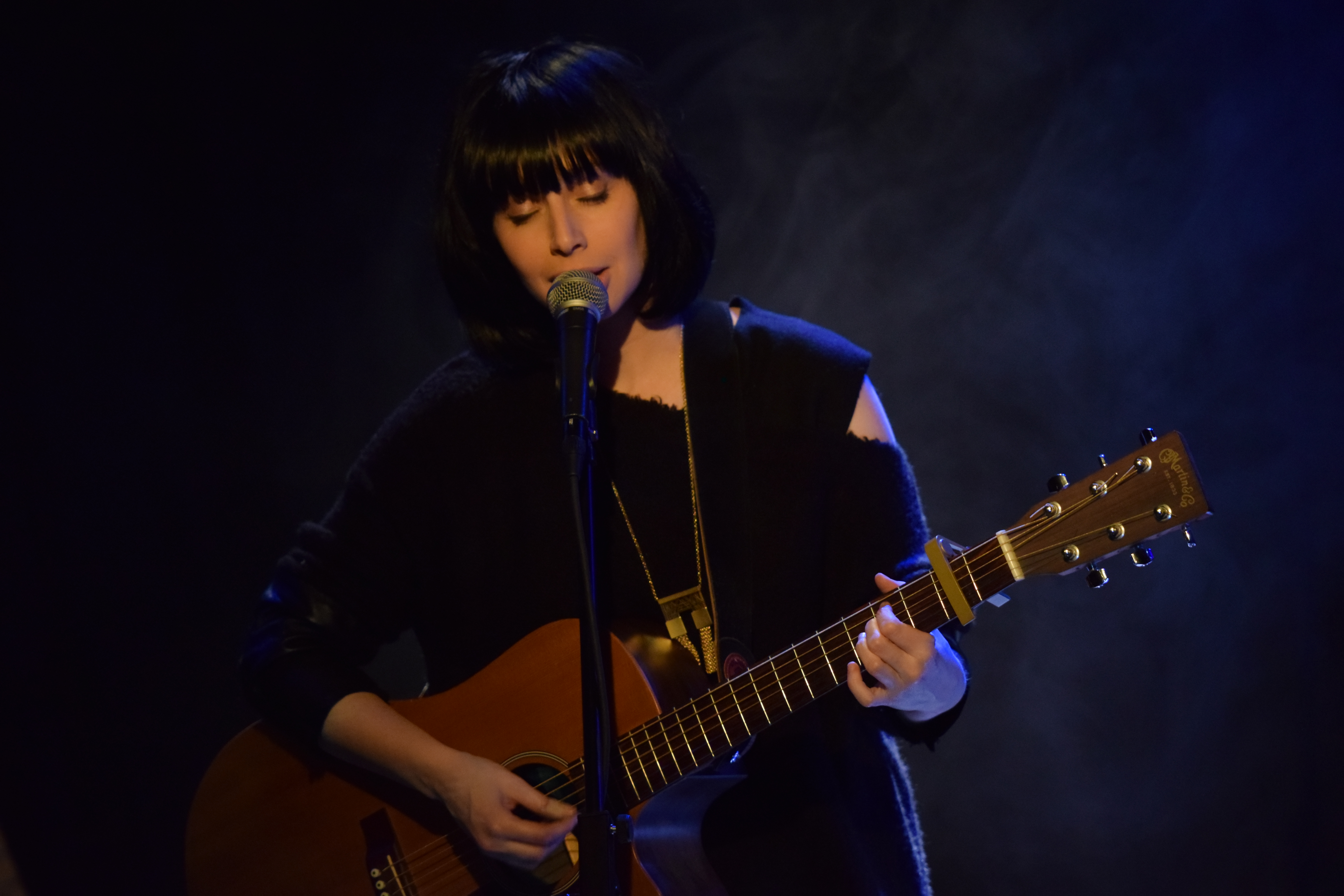
Aya Korem, 2015

The lyrics of Zahav Shahor (זהב שחור, "Black Gold") are a female answer to the classic song Atur Mitzkhekh written by Yoni Rechter. Korem's producer Ori Zakh sent Aya's lyrics to Rechter, and Rechter agreed to write music for the song. In 2009 Aya Korem also recorded the original song Atur Mitzkhekh for the 70th birthday of its original singer, Arik Einstein. The song Tania (טניה) is inspired by Louis-Ferdinand Céline's novel Journey to the End of the Night. Most of the songs are written by Korem herself also in her second album. The exceptions are Ruhot HaMa'arav (רוחות המערב, "Western Winds") by Yonatan Gutfeld, Akhshav Kazot with music by Ilay Botner, "HaSof shel HaSipur" and "Zahav Shahor".

Both albums were recorded with the Anana label of the Hed Arzi Music corporation.

In 2008 Korem recorded a cover for Eran Tzur's song Erev Bet Kislev (ערב ב' כסלו, "The 2nd of Kislev Eve") for the Hebrew Labor 2 collection of cover versions dedicated to the 60th anniversary of Israeli independence. Korem also musically produced the song. She also performed three of her songs for the Pizmon Hozer project, dedicated to the birthday of Gilad Shalit, a captured Israeli soldier, and organized by the NRG website operated by Ma'ariv.

After the release of Safa Zara she introduced a political protest song, "Ha'Isha im HaSakit" (האישה עם השקית, "The Woman with the Bag").

Korem wrote songs for other artists, such as Miri Mesika and Nurit Galron, produced an all-female tribute to Kaveret, starred in a version of The King and I alongside Miki Geva and hosted, for two seasons, together with Danny Robas, a TV show, called "Israeli Duet", where the two hosted and performed with some of Israel's best musicians.

On 30 June 2011, Korem released her third album, Lealef et HaSusim (לאלף את הסוסים, "Taming the Horses"). After walking out on her former label, Korem produced it by herself and published a detailed guide on her blog about how to become an independent artist. This album, produced by Gil Lewis and Tomer Lenzinger, included the songs "Shesh ve'Esrim" (Six-and-twenty), "Rona Omeret" (Rona Says) and a cover of Ahuva Ozeri's song "Tziltzuley Pa'amonim"(Bells Ringing).

In 2013, she published her song Mehandes Machshevim (מהנדסת מחשבים; "Computer Engineer") in Hebrew and Perl on the web.

Her most recent album, Hakochevet Shel Natzaret Ilit ("the Star of Nazareth Ilit") was released in 2021.

== Aya Korem Bill ==
In 2013, while in a long dispute with her label, Korem initiated a bill aimed to protect the rights of musicians in the industry, limiting talent contracts to a maximum of seven years. She led a group of artists to promote the bill, earning it the name "The Aya Korem Bill".

The bill was introduced in the Nineteenth Knesset by MKs Dov Khenin and Amram Mitzna, passed the first reading in 2014, and later passed the second and third reading in the Twentieth Knesset. The bill became law in February 2017.

In January 2015, Korem was released from her contract with Anana, after a legal battle that reached the Supreme court. Korem's victory paved the way for other artists who were bound by their contracts. 24 hours later she released her fourth album, Halev Haze, Hameshumash (הלב הזה, המשומש, "This Used Heart").

== Awards and recognition ==
In September 2016 she released her fifth album, 2023, a dystopic futuristic concept album loosely based on her legal struggle. The album featured prominent artists including Arkadi Duchin, Yishai Levi, Rona Kenan, Mazzie Cohen, Lea Shabat, Nechi Nech, Dani Litani, Efrat Gosh and more. Korem sings only the closing track of the album, Ish Tovea (איש טובע, "Drowning man").

In June 2017 the album received the ACUM Award.

== See also ==
- Music of Israel
