= Rock and Wrap it Up =

Rock and Wrap it Up!
- Founded: 1994
- Founder: Syd Mandelbaum
- Type: 501(c)(3)
- Location: Cedarhurst, New York, United States
- Website: rockandwrapitup.org

Rock and Wrap it Up! is a non-profit organization that was formed by Syd Mandelbaum in 1994. The independent anti-poverty think tank is based in New York, but works with partners across the country to develop greening solutions that address the issues of hunger and poverty in America. The organization works by increasing financial assets available to fight poverty by identifying new revenue streams through food and other basic assets obtained without cost. The organization's roots are in rock 'n' roll music, which is where they got the name Rock and Wrap it Up! The group started by recovering food that was prepared, but not served from venues like Nikon at Jones Beach Theater. Next, the organization started working directly with bands to see that surplus food would be donated instead of being thrown out. Rock and Wrap it Up! works with bands to show them how they can use their contracts as a harvesting tool for food and other assets. Some of the first bands to include Rock and Wrap it Up's suggested clause in their rider were The Rolling Stones, Aerosmith, Bruce Hornsby, The Allman Brothers Band, Tom Petty and Tina Turner.

Rock and Wrap it Up! has expanded its work to include partnerships with sports franchises across America as well as schools and now hotels. The organization is also working with television and film production crews to see that surplus food and other assets are not wasted at the end of shooting.

== Sports Wrap ==
Sports Wrap! is the sector of Rock and Wrap it Up! that works with professional sports teams and the concession stands at ballparks, fields and other arenas to collect food that has been prepared but not sold or served. Rock and Wrap it Up matches this leftover food with a local agency fighting poverty, who in turn recovers the food and serves it at area shelters and soup kitchens.
Partnering Teams:
New York Yankees
New York Mets
Boston Red Sox
New York Giants
New York Jets
New England Patriots
New York Knicks
New Jersey Nets
Philadelphia Eagles
Philadelphia Phillies
Kansas City Royals
New York Islanders
Florida Panthers

== Hotel Wrap! ==
Hotel Wrap! is Rock and Wrap it Up's newest endeavor. They work with hotels to see that toiletries are not thrown into the garbage, but instead shared with local anti-poverty agencies. The group recovers unused or partially used shampoo bottles, bath gel, and other items left behind by hotel guests. Hotel Wrap works with the Housekeeping staff of hotels to develop effective ways to ensure that tissues, toilet paper, and toiletries are shared with those in need instead of ending up in the trash.

== School program ==
School programs Since 1997, over 300 schools nationwide have started Rock and Wrap it Up! School Programs to empower students to recover food and other assets from their schools for distribution in the local community.
Snack Wrap! encourages younger students to share unopened snacks with children in latchkey programs. High School and College students recover food that is prepared but not sold in their schools and share them with agencies in their community who fight poverty. The College Wrap Program also encourages the Give and Go Green Program. Students donate bedding, gently used clothing, small appliances, furniture and non-perishable food at the end of each school year to local agencies rather than disposing these assets into landfills.
