= List of University of Toledo people =

The list of University of Toledo people includes notable alumni and faculty of the University of Toledo. The University of Toledo is a public university in Toledo, Ohio.

== Alumni ==
=== Science ===
Name	Class year	Notability	Reference(s)
David Applebaum	1978	Physician and rabbi	
Carolyn Cannon-Alfred		Pharmacologist	
Bob Dempsey	1991	NASA flight director	
Fred Espenak	1976	Astrophysicist known for work relating to eclipse predictions	
William H. Gerstenmaier	1981	Masters in Mechanical Engineering; associate administrator for Human Exploration and Operations for NASA since 2005	
Karen Seibert	1987	Instrumental in the elaboration of the COX-2 inflammatory pathway	

=== Medicine ===
Name	Class year	Notability	Reference(s)
Darrick E. Antell		World-renowned plastic surgeon	

=== Technology and innovation ===
Name	Class year	Notability	Reference(s)
Fredric J. Baur		Inventor of the Pringles can	
Paul Chongkun Hong		Distinguished University Professor	
David Liddle		Developer on the Xerox Star	
Richard Schreder	1938	Aircraft developer	

=== Law and politics ===
Name	Class year	Notability	Reference(s)
Mike Bell	1978	Former mayor of Toledo	
Daniel Bogden	1981 (J.D.)	United States attorney for the District of Nevada	
Shamila N. Chaudhary	1999	United States Government adviser and expert on Pakistan	
Andrew Douglas		Justice of the Ohio Supreme Court	
Teresa Fedor	1983	Member of Ohio House of Representatives and Ohio Senate	
Jack Ford		Former mayor of Toledo	
Stewart Greenleaf	1966 (J.D.)	Member of the Pennsylvania State Senate since 1979	
Patricia Kabbah		Former First Lady of Sierra Leone	
Alan George Lance	1973 (J.D.)	Federal judge, Idaho Attorney General (1995–2003); national commander of The American Legion (1999–2000)	
Judith Ann Lanzinger		Justice of the Ohio Supreme Court	
Bob Latta	1981 (J.D.)	Member of the United States House of Representatives since 2007	
Rob McColley	2010 (J.D.)	97th President of the Ohio Senate since 2025	
John W. Snow		Former United States Secretary of the Treasury (2003–2006)	
Ketil Solvik-Olsen		Norwegian Minister of Transport and Communications (2013–2018)	
Matt Szollosi		Member of Ohio House of Representatives	
Gene Zmuda	1984 (J.D.)	Municipal court judge and politician	
Jack Zouhary	1976 (J.D.)	Federal district court judge	

=== Diplomats ===
Name	Class year	Notability	Reference(s)
Elin Suleymanov	1994	Ambassador of Republic of Azerbaijan to the United States	

=== Business ===
Name	Class year	Notability	Reference(s)
John Neff		One of Barron's magazine's "10 most influential investors of the 20th century"	

=== Journalism and news ===
Name	Class year	Notability	Reference(s)
Janet Cooke		Disgraced journalist, forced to return a Pulitzer Prize for a fabricated story	
Cliff Kincaid	c. 1976	Investigative journalist with Accuracy in Media and American Survival, Inc.	
Christi Paul		CNN Headline News anchor	
Michael Sallah		Washington Post investigative reporter; winner of 2004 Pulitzer Prize for Investigative Reporting	
G. Gordon Strong		Newspaper publisher	

=== Academics ===
Name	Class year	Notability	Reference(s)
Mark Berger		Professor at University of Kentucky	
Robert Ghrist		Professor at University of Pennsylvania	
William Marshall Grange		Hixson Lied Professor of Theatre and Film at University of Nebraska–Lincoln	
James T. Harris III		1980 graduate and president of Widener University	
Gerald Jakubowski		Provost of California Maritime Academy; former president of Rose-Hulman Institute of Technology	
Nina McClelland		Dean emeritus and former professor of chemistry	
Jim Rex		South Carolina superintendent of Education	
Louis Shores		Librarian	

=== Literature, art, and architecture ===
Name	Class year	Notability	Reference(s)
Mari Evans		Author and dramatist	
Mildred D. Taylor	1965	Author	
William Yosses		White House executive pastry chef	

=== Music ===
Name	Class year	Notability	Reference(s)
Dosia Carlson	1954	Minister and hymnwriter	
Margaret Carson		Long-time publicist for Leonard Bernstein and Benny Goodman	
Jon Hendricks		Jazz lyricist and singer	
Scott Mescudi		Rap lyricist and singer	

=== Film and television ===
Name	Class year	Notability	Reference(s)
Bill Cunningham	1975 (J.D.)	Radio host, talk show host, The Bill Cunningham Show	
Andrew J. Fenady		Actor, screenwriter, producer	
Philip Baker Hall		Actor, Boogie Nights and You Kill Me	
Jeff Johnson	1996	Social commentator for BET	
Les Mitchel		Radio and film producer, director and actor	
Shirley Mitchell		Radio, film, and television actress	
Danny Thomas		Nightclub comedian; television and film actor and producer; founder of St. Jude Children's Research Hospital	
Scott Wozniak		YouTuber	
Chris Zylka		Actor, The Secret Circle and The Amazing Spider-Man	

=== Athletics ===
==== Football ====
Name	Class year	Notability	Reference(s)
Tom Amstutz	1976	College football player and former UT men's football coach	
Bob Beemer	1985	Retired NFL defensive end for the Detroit Lions	
Chuck Ealey	1971	University of Toledo's starting quarterback for 35 straight wins, 1969–1971	
Jerry Evans		Retired tight end for the Denver Broncos	
T. J. Fatinikun		Defensive end	
Carl Ford		Retired NFL wide receiver for Green Bay Packers	
Todd France	2001	Former NFL kicker	
Bruce Gradkowski	2005	Former quarterback for Pittsburgh Steelers	
John Greco	2007	Offensive guard for Cleveland Browns	
Kelly Herndon		Former starting cornerback for Seattle Seahawks (2007)	
Kareem Hunt	2017	Running back for Kansas City Chiefs and Cleveland Browns	
Curtis Johnson	1969	Defensive back for the 1972 undefeated Miami Dolphins "no-name defense"	
Diontae Johnson	2018	Wide receiver for the Cleveland Browns	
Nick Kaczur	2004	Starting tackle for New England Patriots (2008)	
Brett Kern	2008	Punter for Tennessee Titans	
Jason Lamar		NFL and CFL player	
Mel Long	1971	NCAA Hall of Fame	
Greg Mancz		Center	
Andy McCollum	1992	NFL center for the Detroit Lions, formerly with the New Orleans Saints and St. Louis Rams	
Lance Moore	2004	Wide receiver for New Orleans Saints, winners of Super Bowl XLIV	
Jalen Parmele	2007	Running back for Baltimore Ravens	
Dave Ridgway		Placekicker in the Canadian Football League	
Chuck Sample		Fullback for the Green Bay Packers	
Chester Taylor	2001	Former running back for the Chicago Bears	
Mel Triplett		NFL running back for the New York Giants	
Emlen Tunnell		Pro Football Hall of Fame	
Brent Williams		Retired NFL defensive end	
Dan Williams	1992	Retired defensive lineman for the Kansas City Chiefs and Denver Broncos	

==== Basketball ====
Name	Class year	Notability	Reference(s)
John Brisker		Forward/guard for Pittsburgh Pipers, Pittsburgh Condors and Seattle SuperSonics (1969–1975)	
Stan Joplin		College basketball player, UT men's basketball coach 1996–2008	
Phil Martin		Former NBA guard	
Steve Mix		Former NBA All-Star, only men's player to have jersey retired (2/17/07), played 13 years in NBA	
George Patterson		NBA player	

==== Baseball ====
Name	Class year	Notability	Reference(s)
Mitch Maier		Outfielder for the Kansas City Royals	
Denny Stark		MLB pitcher	

==== Track and field ====
Name	Class year	Notability	Reference(s)
Sy Mah		Long-distance runner; held a Guinness World Record for the most lifetime marathons	

==== Tennis ====
Name	Class year	Notability	Reference(s)
Vic Braden		Tennis instructor; former professional player; author; researcher; licensed psychologist	

==== Wrestling ====
Name	Class year	Notability	Reference(s)
Greg Wojciechowski		NCAA heavyweight wrestling champion in 1971	

==== Winter sports ====
Name	Class year	Notability	Reference(s)
Brock Kreitzburg		Bobsledder	

== Faculty ==
- James Campbell, Distinguished University Professor in philosophy
- Laurie Dinnebeil, Distinguished University Professor, and Daso Herb Endowed Chair
- Lars Jorgensen (born 1970), swimmer and college coach
- Clyde Summers (1918–2010), labor lawyer and law professor at the University of Pennsylvania Law School

== Heads of university ==
	University presidents	Years as president
1	Jerome Raymond	1909–1910
2	Charles A. Cockayne	1910–1914
3	A. Monroe Stowe	1914–1925
4	John W. Dowd	1925–1926
5	Earnest A. Smith	1927
6	Henry J. Doermann	1928–1932
7	Philip C. Nash	1933–1947
8	Wilbur W. White	1947–1950
9	Asa S. Knowles	1951–1958
10	William S. Carlson	1958–1972
11	Glen R. Driscoll	1972–1985
12	James Douglas McComas	1985–1988
13	Frank E. Horton	1989–1998
14	Vik J. Kapoor	1999–2000
15	Daniel M. Johnson	2001–2006
16	Lloyd Jacobs, M.D.	2006–2014
–	Nagi Naganathan, Ph.D.	Interim, 2014–2015
17	Sharon Gaber, Ph.D.	2015–2020
18	Gregory Postel, M.D.	2020–2024
–	Matt Schroeder	Interim, 2024–2025
19	James Holloway, Ph.D.	2025–present
