= List of 4-H alumni =

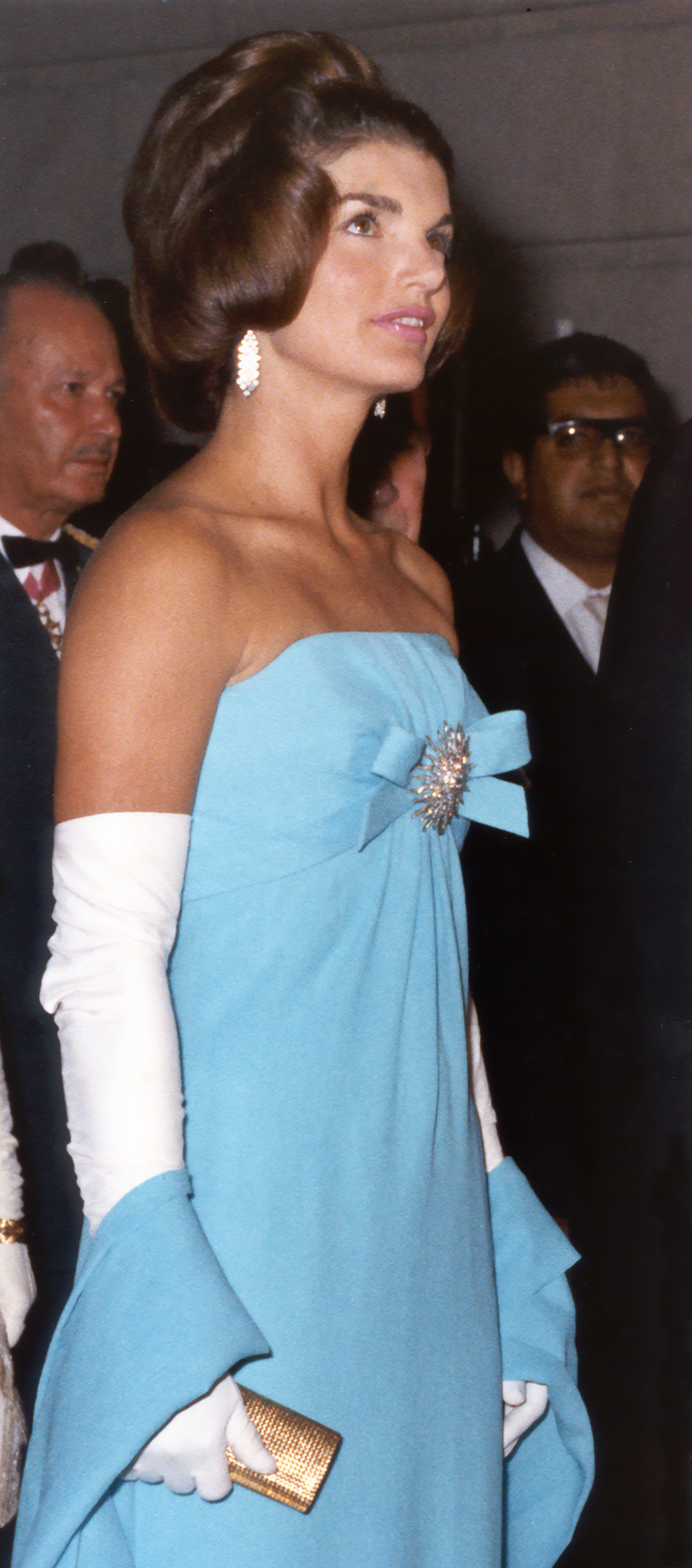
Jacqueline Kennedy Onassis raised a calf while a member.

4-H alumni are represented across numerous professions, including politicians, entertainers, athletes, business individuals, and educators.

== Political figures ==
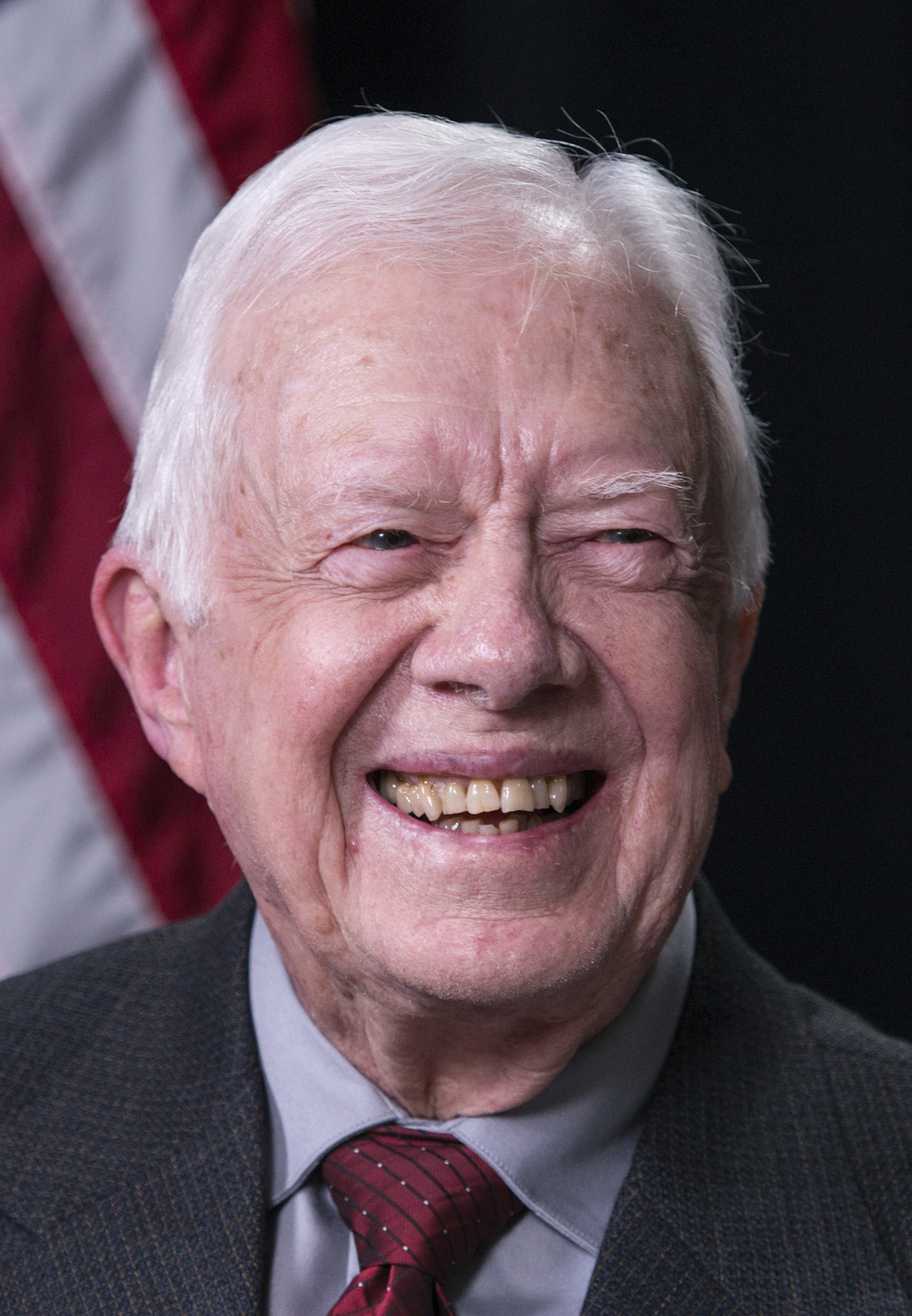
Former President Jimmy Carter was a 4-H member.

Notable alumni include U.S. President Jimmy Carter, and U.S. Vice Presidents Al Gore and Walter Mondale.

Current and former U.S. Senators

- Howard Baker
- Birch Bayh
- Sam Brownback
- Dale Bumpers
- Conrad Burns
- Ben Nighthorse Campbell
- Thad Cochran
- Mike DeWine
- Bob Dole
- Byron Dorgan
- Wendell H. Ford
- Bob Graham
- Judd Gregg
- Clifford Hansen
- Tom Harkin
- Orrin Hatch
- Mike Johanns
- Jon Llewellyn Kyl
- Mitch McConnell
- Bill Nelson
- Sam Nunn
- Larry Pressler
- Pat Roberts
- W. Kerr Scott
- Jeff Sessions
- Paul Simon
- Debbie Stabenow
- Steve Symms
- Herman Talmadge
- Craig L. Thomas
- Strom Thurmond
- Malcolm Wallop

Current and former U.S. Governors
Alabama

- George Wallace

Arkansas

- Asa Hutchinson

Georgia

- Roy Barnes
- Nathan Deal
- Sonny Perdue

Hawai'i

- John Waihee

Iowa

- Terry Branstad

Kansas

- William H. Avery
- John W. Carlin
- Nancy Kassebaum

Kentucky

- Martha Layne Collins
- Paul E. Patton

Maine

- John Baldacci

Michigan

- John Engler

North Carolina

- Jim Hunt
- Robert W. Scott

Oklahoma
Mary Fallin

- Raymond D. Gary

North Dakota

- William L. Guy

Tennessee

- Buford Ellington

Utah

- Olene Walker

Vermont

- Jim Douglas

Virginia

- Gerald L. Baliles

Wisconsin

- Tommy Thompson

Wyoming

- Mike Sullivan

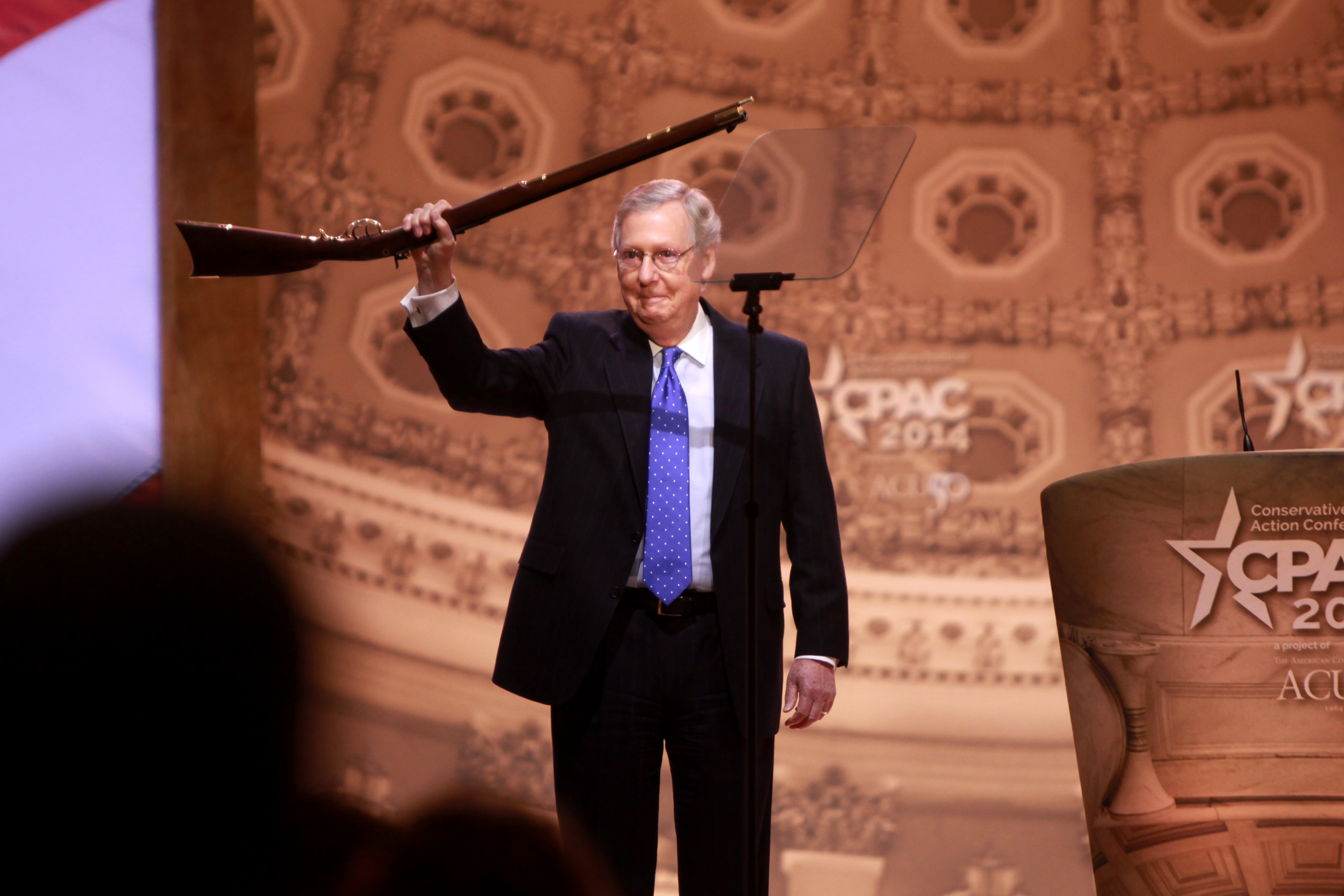
Mitch McConnell was previously the U.S. Senate Minority Leader.

Current and former members of Congress include

- Carl Albert
- William Vollie Alexander Jr.
- John F. Baldwin Jr.
- Roscoe Bartlett
- Rick Berg
- Jaime Herrera Beutler
- Tom Bevill
- Rick Boucher
- Allen Boyd
- William V. Chappell Jr.
- Donald H. Clausen
- Eva M. Clayton
- Howard Coble
- Tony Coelho
- Larry Combest
- Jim Cooper
- George Darden
- Robert William Davis
- Roy Dyson
- Bill Emerson
- Glenn English
- Ronnie Flippo
- William D. Ford
- Virginia Foxx
- Sam Gejdenson
- William F. Goodling
- Bill Grant
- Ralph Hall
- John Paul Hammerschmidt
- Katherine Harris
- J.D. Hayworth
- Wally Herger
- Clyde Holloway
- Jerry Huckaby
- Kenny Hulshof
- Earl Hutto
- Ed Jenkins
- William L. Jenkins
- Chris John
- Ed Jones
- Ron Kind
- Jim Kolbe
- Martin Lancaster
- Tom Latham
- Tiffany Lawrence
- Jim Lightfoot
- Koln McKay
- John T. Myers
- Sue Myrick
- William Flynt Nichols
- Chip Pickering
- Graham Purcell
- Adam Putnam
- Ralph Regula
- J. Roy Rowland
- Martin Sabo
- Daniel Schaefer
- Jim Slattery
- D. French Slaughter
- Bob Smith
- Neal Edward Smith
- Virginia D. Smith
- John Sparkman
- Floyd Spence
- David Stockman
- Bob Stump
- Mike Synar
- Charles H. Taylor
- Gene Taylor
- Lindsay Thomas
- Bennie Thompson
- Jill Long Thompson
- Edolphus Towns
- Bob Traxler
- Morris Udall
- Wes Watkins
- Vin Weber
- Jerry Weller
- Jamie Whitten
- Heather Wilson

Former Puerto Rico Senator Miguel Deynes Soto.

Cabinet officials

- John Rusling Block and Ann Veneman, former secretaries of Agriculture

First Ladies

- Rosalynn Carter
- Jacqueline Kennedy Onassis
- Pat Nixon
- Idaho First Lady Patricia Kempthorne

Native Americans

- Ethel Branch

== Academics ==
George Beadle was a pioneering geneticist who won the Nobel prize in 1958.

- former Kansas State University President Duane Acker
- former Chancellor of Texas A&M University Perry Adkisson
- former U.S. Secretary of Education Lamar Alexander
- Nobel Prize winners George Beadle and Daniel McFadden
- former Arizona State University President Lattie Coor
- Colorado State University System President Tony Frank
- Harvard University President Drew Gilpin Faust
- West Virginia University President Gordon Gee
- Steve Gunderson of the Career Education Colleges and Universities
- Former University of Illinois President Stanley O. Ikenberry
- Former Yale University President Howard Lamar
- Former Virginia Tech President William Edward Lavery
- Former University of New Hampshire President Joan Leitzel
- Former Clemson University President Max Lennon
- Former Auburn University President James E. Martin
- Former Kent State University President Glenn Olds
- Former University of Nebraska President Ronald Roskens
- Former Penn State University President Graham B. Spanier
- Former University of Maryland President John S. Toll
- Former Mississippi State University President Donald W. Zacharias

== Arts and literature ==
- Frank Herbert, American Science Fiction writer
- Jim Davis, cartoonist
- Pulitzer Prize winning novelist John Updike

== Business and industry ==
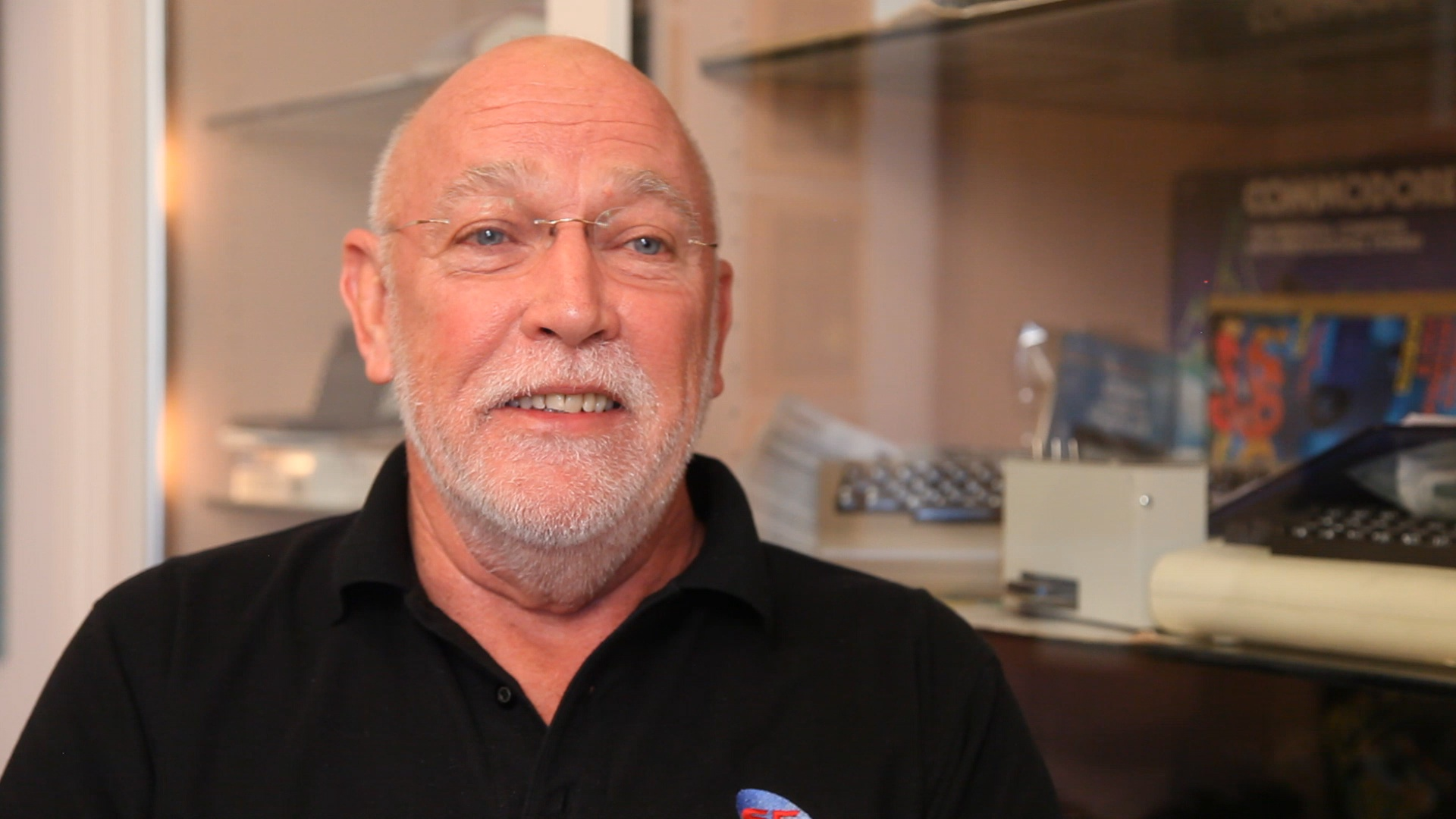
Bill Mensch studied electronics as a 4-H member.

- Andrew Bosworth of Facebook
- Colby Chandler of Eastman Kodak
- Arnold W. Donald of Carnival Corporation
- Bob Evans
- Ken C. Hicks of Footlocker
- Bill Mensch of the Western Design Center
- Javier Palomarez of the United States Hispanic Chamber of Commerce
- Harold Poling of the Ford Motor Company
- Orville Redenbacher
- Edward B. Rust Jr. of State Farm Insurance
- Jesse W. Tapp of Bank of America
- Randall L. Tobias of Eli Lilly and Co.
- Leland Tollett of Tyson Foods
- Frank L. VanderSloot of Melaleuca
- Nancy Zieman of Sewing with Nancy

== Entertainment and media ==
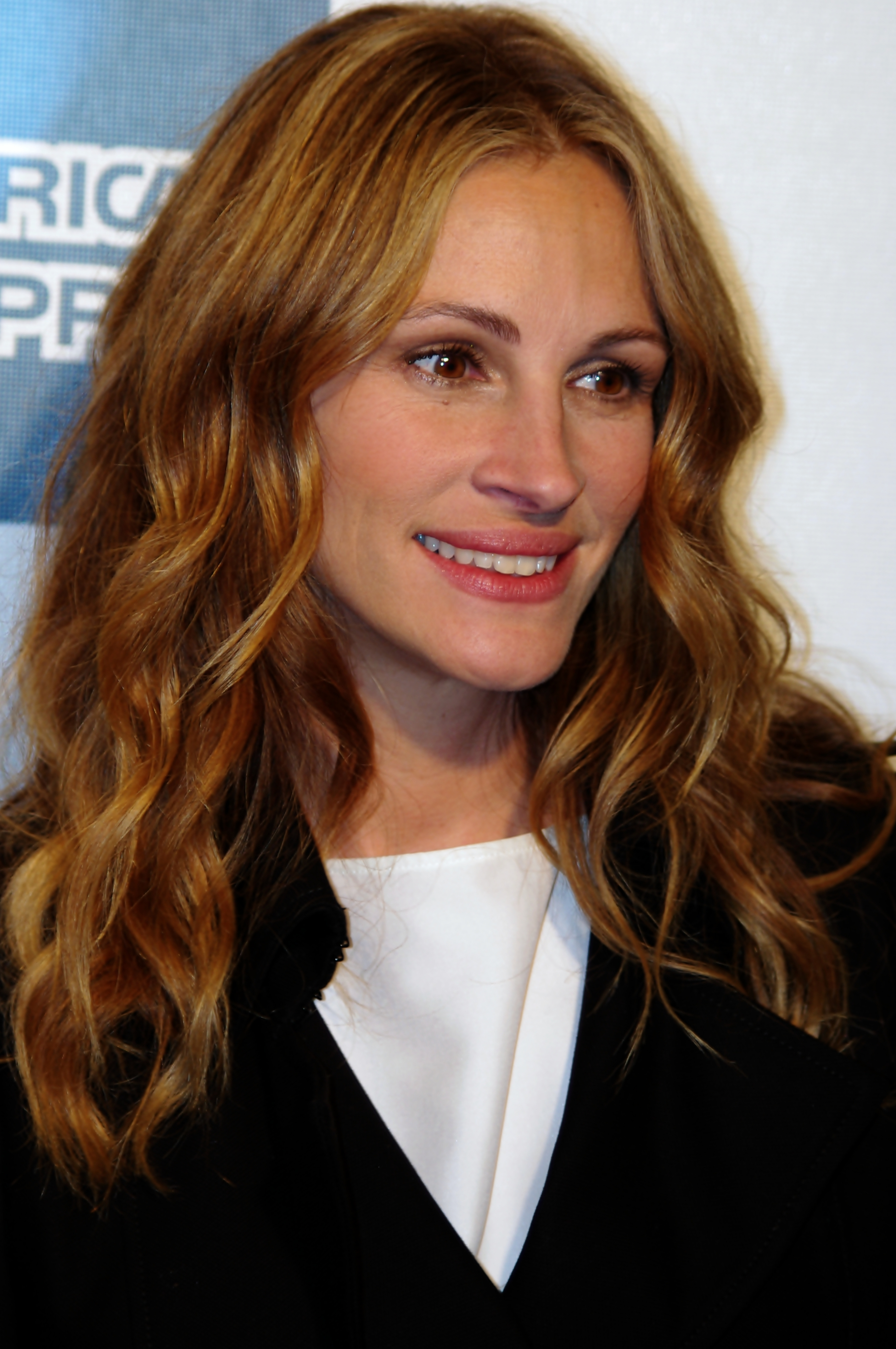
Julia Roberts.

- Anne Burrell of the Food Network
- Johnny Carson
- Steve Doocy
- Nancy Grace
- Florence Henderson
- Maya Higa
- Holly Hunter
- Karen Kilgariff
- David Letterman
- Miss America Jacque Mercer
- Jim Nabors
- Aubrey Plaza
- Donna Reed
- Julia Roberts
- Sissy Spacek
- Tony Award nominee Tom Wopat

== Military ==
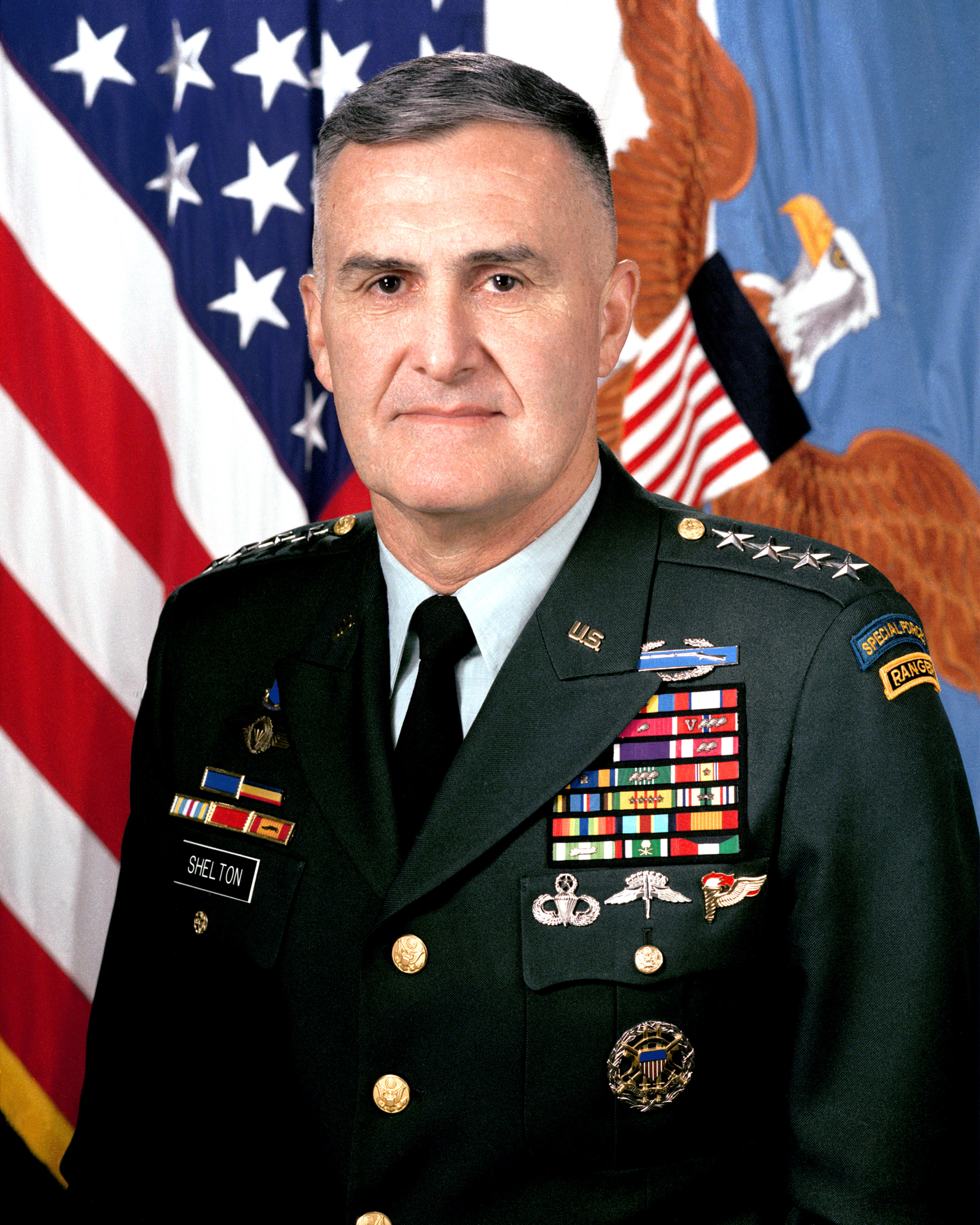
General Hugh Shelton raised Hereford steers as a member.

- General Creighton Abrams
- Lieutenant General Russel L. Honoré
- General Hugh Shelton
- Brigadier General Wilma Vaught

== Music ==
- Roy Acuff
- Luke Bryan
- Glen Campbell
- Johnny Cash
- John Denver
- Vince Gill
- Faith Hill
- Jermaine Jackson
- Reba McEntire
- Sherrill Milnes
- Jennifer Nettles
- Randy Owen
- Dolly Parton
- Charley Pride
- Kevin Richardson
- Jean Ritchie
- Roy Rogers
- Ricky Skaggs
- Trisha Yearwood

== Sciences and technology ==
4-H alumni include the astronauts:

- Bonnie J. Dunbar
- Ellison Onizuka
- Jerry L. Ross
- Alan Shepard
- Peggy Whitson
- Donald E. Williams

== Sports ==
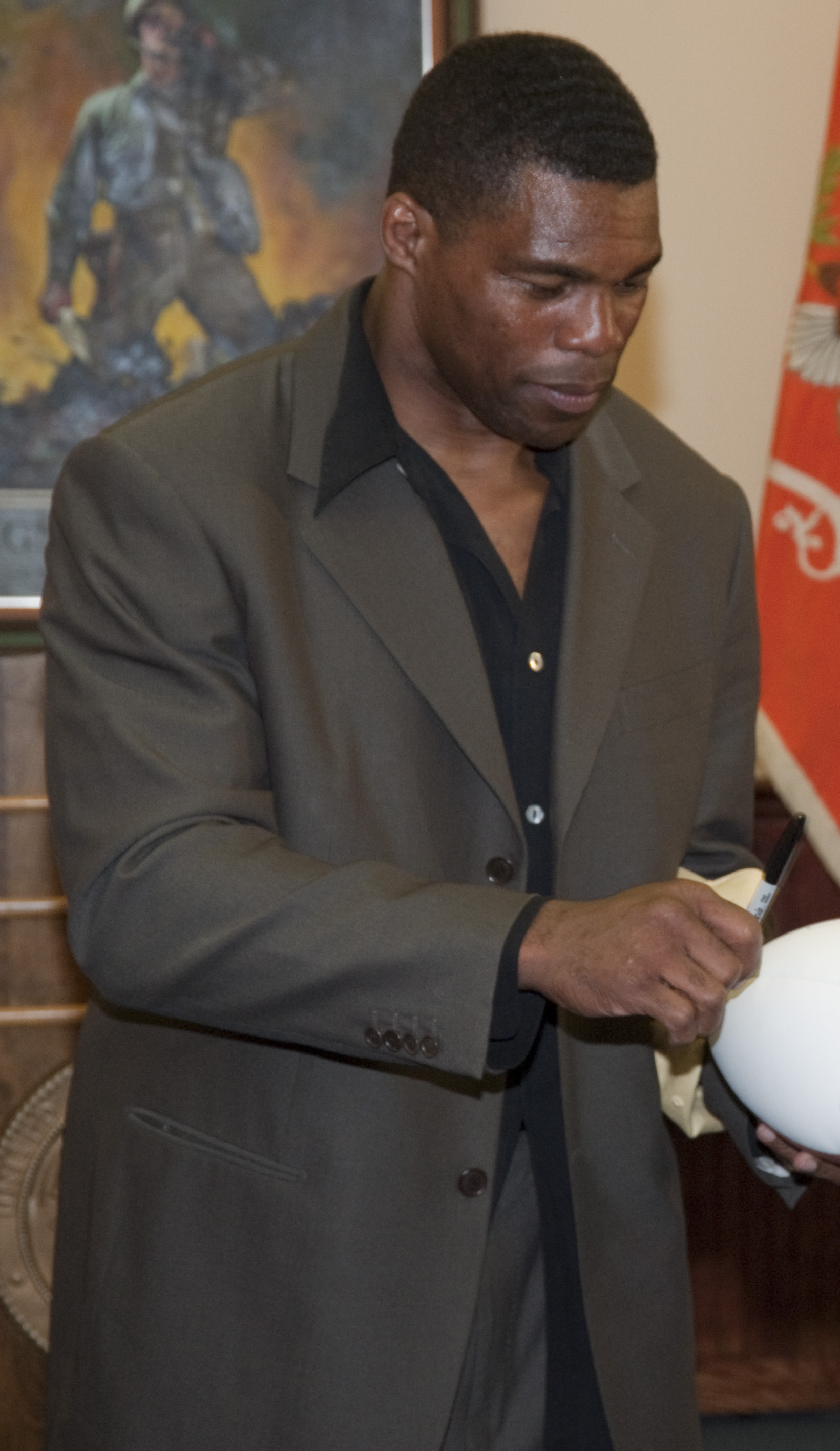
Herschel Walker won the Heisman Trophy in 1982.

- Robert A. "Bob" Baffert, racehorse trainer
- Johnny Bench
- U.S. Triple Crown jockey Steve Cauthen
- Olympic Gold Medal winner Stacy Dragila
- NASCAR Champion Ned Jarrett
- Archie Manning
- National Collegiate Basketball coach Pat Summitt
- Dan Reeves
- Original owner of the Miami Dolphins Joe Robbie
- All-Time leading women's professional basketball scorer Katie Smith
- Heisman Trophy winner Herschel Walker
- Reggie White
