= Roy P. Peterson =

American academic administrator

President of Tennessee State University
- In office 1985–1986

Personal details
- Born: November 16, 1934
- Died: November 28, 1998 (aged 64) Lexington, Kentucky, U.S.
- Education: Southern University; University of Oregon; University of Iowa

Roy P. Peterson (November 16, 1934 - November 28, 1998) was an American academic administrator. He served as the president of Tennessee State University, a historically black public university in Nashville, Tennessee, from 1985 to 1986.

== Early life ==
Peterson was born on November 16, 1934. He graduated from Southern University, where he earned a bachelor's degree. He earned a master's degree from the University of Oregon, and a PhD from the University of Iowa.

== Career ==
Peterson served as the interim president of Tennessee State University from 1985 to 1986.

Peterson briefly worked for the Illinois Oversight Board of Higher Education. He was assistant to the executive director of the Kentucky Council on Higher Education from 1986 to 1995. He served as the secretary of the Kentucky Education, Arts and Humanities Cabinet from 1995 to 1998.

== Personal life and death ==
With his wife Juanita, Peterson had two sons and a daughter. They resided in Lexington, Kentucky.

Peterson died of lung cancer on November 28, 1998, in Lexington, at 64.
