= James Douglas McComas =

13th President of Virginia Polytechnic Institute and State University
- In office 1988–1993
- Preceded by: William Edward Lavery
- Succeeded by: Paul Torgersen

12th President of University of Toledo
- In office 1985–1988
- Preceded by: Glen R. Driscoll
- Succeeded by: Frank E. Horton

14th President of Mississippi State University
- In office 1975–1985
- Preceded by: William L. Giles
- Succeeded by: Donald W. Zacharias

Personal details
- Born: December 23, 1928 Prichard, West Virginia, U.S.
- Died: February 10, 1994 (aged 65) Columbus, Ohio, U.S.

James Douglas McComas (December 23, 1928 – February 10, 1994) was 14th President of Mississippi State University from 1975-1985, the 12th President of the University of Toledo from 1985 to 1988, and the 13th President of Virginia Polytechnic Institute and State University, from 1988 to 1993.

McComas taught Vocational Agriculture in the 1950s and later served as head of the Department of Elementary and Secondary Education at New Mexico State University from 1966 to 1967; dean of the College of Education, at Kansas State University, from 1967 to 1969; and dean of the College of Education at University of Tennessee from 1969 to 1975 when he was named president of Mississippi State.

== President of Virginia Tech ==
McComas was hired to guide Virginia Tech back into smooth waters after the fallout from a controversial land deal and an athletic scandal led to the resignation of William Edward Lavery. He assumed his new duties on September 1, 1988.

From the beginning of his administration, McComas placed major emphasis on undergraduate education. He kept an open-door policy for students, personally visited over 4,500 of them in the residence halls, and advised 16. He established the Center for Excellence in Teaching and the Academic Advising Center; bolstered the honors program; saw that food in the dining halls was improved; created an Office of the Dean of Students; began planning a student recreation and fitness center; established commencement ceremonies at the end of fall semester; and developed EXPO, a “road show” of information about Virginia Tech for high school students throughout the commonwealth. He also established incentives to draw more National Merit Scholars to Virginia Tech, moving the university into the nation’s top 20 in the number of merit scholars it attracted.

McComas had been in office only a year when the state learned that its projected revenues had been vastly overestimated, and Gov. L. Douglas Wilder ordered severe funding cuts to higher education to balance the budget. Cuts to Virginia Tech alone in the 1990-92 biennium totaled $37 million (general fund reductions 1990-96 totaled $46.7 million, but the university was able to offset $16 million, principally by raising tuition). As Virginia dropped to 43rd in the country in state funding for higher education, McComas publicly decried the assault on higher education, resulting in strained relations with Wilder. The cuts forced the university to hold numerous faculty positions vacant for a period of time; 49 classified staff members lost their jobs, but the university was able to reassign 25 of them to other positions.

On the positive side, the Norfolk Southern Corporation gave Hotel Roanoke to the university in 1989. McComas, who had played a leading role in forging stronger ties with the City of Roanoke, directed Virginia Tech as it worked with Roanoke leaders to raise approximately $50 million to renovate the century-old hotel, build an adjacent conference center, and make road and pedestrian-access improvements in the adjacent area.

The president placed special emphasis on Tech’s traditional land-grant role of outreach and service, established a Public Service Division, and appointed an acting vice president for public service. Later, he created the position of vice provost for outreach and international programs and hired the university’s first black vice provost. He led the effort to make the university a force in economic development, helped form the New Century Council to create a strategic vision for the region, and initiated a series of public service forums throughout the state. He worked with town officials to bring a national Family Motor Coach Association convention and the Tour DuPont to Blacksburg to boost regional economic development.

On campus he stressed the importance of community and emphasized the value of all employees to the operation of the university. He supported an overhaul of the university’s governance structure and the inclusion of classified staff in that structure. He encouraged diversity—minority student enrollment increased 26 percent in 1990—and supported the appointment of minorities and women to administrative positions. He oversaw the reorganization of athletics and the recruitment of an academic advising coordinator for athletes, transferred operations of the Alumni Association to the university’s administrative system, and placed administration of Virginia Cooperative Extension under the College of Agriculture and Life Sciences.

During his tenure, research spending reached $125 million, the school of forestry became Tech’s ninth college, U.S. News & World Report ranked Tech in the top 50 national universities, Tech joined the Big East football conference, McComas established the Presidential Award for Excellence to recognize outstanding classified staff members, Tech joined the town and C&P Telephone Company in unveiling the Blacksburg Electronic Village, and serious planning began for a "smart" highway between Blacksburg and Roanoke.

Additionally, the university raised $17 million in a campaign for athletic scholarships and facilities and initiated the Campaign for Virginia Tech to raise $250 million by 1998. State voters approved a $472-million bond issue, which included $46 million for construction at Virginia Tech (McComas had campaigned heavily for the bond issue). The university secured final federal funding for a biotechnology center, and the Virginia Tech Foundation purchased facilities in Switzerland to house a new international studies center. In 1991 a flash flood left over $4 million in damages, principally to the Donaldson Brown Center and War Memorial Gym, spurring a much-needed renovation of the center, which was renamed Donaldson Brown Hotel & Conference Center. Payne Hall, the first new residence hall built on the Virginia Tech campus in more than a decade, and the first to offer air conditioning was completed in 1993. The university also began charging faculty and staff to park on campus, as required by the state, and improved campus accessibility, as required by the Americans with Disabilities Act.

On September 28, 1993, McComas, diagnosed the week before with colon cancer, announced that he was stepping down immediately to begin chemotherapy and would resign effective January 1, 1994. In December 1993 the board adopted a resolution to present McComas with the Ruffner Medal. He died on February 10, 1994.

== Early life and education ==
McComas was born December 23, 1928, in Prichard, West Virginia. He received his bachelor’s degree in Agricultural education from West Virginia University in 1951; and earned a master’s in 1960 and Ph.D. in education in 1962, both from Ohio State University. He Married Adele Stoltz of Gouverneur, New York, on May 10, 1961; they had two children.

== Honors ==
McComas Hall at Mississippi State, which is home of the Department of Communication and the University Art Gallery, is named in his honor.

McComas Hall at Virginia Tech, which houses the Thomas E. Cook Counseling Center, Charles W. Shiffert Health Center, and the Department of Recreational Sports is named in his honor.

McComas Village, home of many fraternities and sororities at the University of Toledo, is named in his honor.

Academic offices
Preceded by William Edward Lavery	Virginia Tech president 1988–1993	Succeeded by Paul Torgersen
Preceded by Glen R. Driscoll	President of University of Toledo; 1985–1988	Succeeded by Frank E. Horton
Preceded by William L. Giles	President of Mississippi State University; 1976–1985	Succeeded by Donald W. Zacharias
