= Paul Torgersen =

American academic (1931–2015)

14th President of Virginia Polytechnic Institute and State University
- In office 1993–2000
- Preceded by: James D. McComas
- Succeeded by: Charles W. Steger

Personal details
- Born: October 13, 1931 Staten Island, New York, U.S.
- Died: March 29, 2015 (aged 83) Blacksburg, Virginia, U.S.
- Education: Lehigh University; Ohio State University
- Website: Official Website

Paul Ernest Torgersen (October 13, 1931 – March 29, 2015) was the 14th President of Virginia Polytechnic Institute and State University.

== Background ==
Torgersen was born in Staten Island, New York. He earned a B.S. degree in industrial engineering from Lehigh University in 1953. Subsequently, he went to Ohio State University, where he received an M.S. degree in industrial engineering in 1956 and a Ph.D. degree in 1959.

Torgersen came to Virginia Tech in 1967 as a professor and the head of the Department of Industrial Engineering. In 1970, he was appointed dean of the College of Engineering, a post he held for over 20 years. He led the College of Engineering to its place of national distinction – being ranked 17th in the nation among public and private institutions – and then served as president of the Corporate Research Center. He was interim vice president for development and university relations. He also briefly served as interim president of Virginia Tech after William Lavery stepped down in 1987 prior to James McComas' arrival in 1988. He was named president of Tech in late 1993 after McComas stepped down and served until January 2000. He taught at least one three-hour course each semester for the past 43 years.

Torgersen was a Fellow of the Institute of Industrial Engineers and the American Society of Engineering Education. In 2001 he received the Institute's highest recognition – the Frank and Lillian Gilbreth Award and earlier, in 1991, had received ASEE's Lamme Medal. He received Tech's first Affirmative Action Award, its 1992 Sporn Award for Teaching Excellence and was named Virginia's Engineering Educator of the Year in 1992. He served from 1979 to 1981 as chairman of the engineering Deans’ Council (the national organization of engineering deans).

== Honors and awards ==
Torgersen received the Benjamin G. Lamme Meritorious Achievement Medal from the Ohio State University in 1990. He also was awarded an honorary D.Eng. degree by Lehigh University in 1997.

On October 6, 2000, with the completion of the 28-million-dollar Communications and Information Technology facility, a dedication was held and the building was named Paul E. Torgersen Hall.

== Death ==
Torgersen gave his final lecture on May 7, 2014, to his Theory of Organization class. He died on March 30, 2015. His wife, Dorothea, to whom he was married for sixty years, had died in October 2014.
