= Paul E. Patton =

American politician (born 1937)

Paul Patton
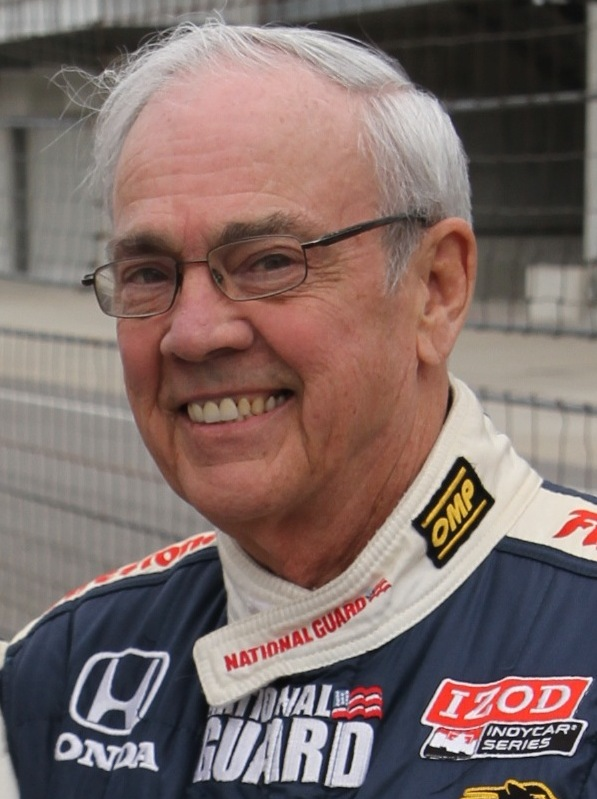
- Patton in 2013

19th President of University of Pikeville
- In office July 6, 2010 – October 19, 2013
- Preceded by: Michael Looney
- Succeeded by: James L. Hurley

59th Governor of Kentucky
- In office December 12, 1995 – December 9, 2003
- Lieutenant: Steve Henry
- Preceded by: Brereton Jones
- Succeeded by: Ernie Fletcher

Chair of the National Governors Association
- In office July 16, 2002 – August 19, 2003
- Preceded by: John Engler
- Succeeded by: Dirk Kempthorne

51st Lieutenant Governor of Kentucky
- In office December 10, 1991 – December 12, 1995
- Governor: Brereton Jones
- Preceded by: Brereton Jones
- Succeeded by: Steve Henry

Judge-Executive of Pike County
- In office January 4, 1982 – December 10, 1991
- Preceded by: Wayne Rutherford
- Succeeded by: Stirl Harris

Personal details
- Born: Paul Edward Patton; May 26, 1937 (age 89) Fallsburg, Kentucky, U.S.
- Party: Democratic
- Spouse(s): Carol Cooley; Judi Conway
- Education: University of Kentucky (BS)

Paul Edward Patton (born May 26, 1937) is an American politician who served as the 59th governor of Kentucky from 1995 to 2003. Because of a 1992 amendment to the Kentucky Constitution, he was the first governor eligible to run for a second term in office since James Garrard in 1800. Since 2013, he has been the chancellor of the University of Pikeville in Pikeville, Kentucky, after serving as its president from 2010 to 2013. He also served as chairman of the Kentucky Council on Postsecondary Education from 2009 to 2011.

After graduating from the University of Kentucky in 1959, Patton became wealthy by operating coal mines for 20 years. He sold most of his coal interests, in the late 1970s, and he entered politics, serving, briefly, in the cabinet of Governor John Y. Brown Jr. and chairing the state Democratic Party. In 1981, he was elected judge/executive of Pike County. He made an unsuccessful bid for lieutenant governor in 1987, but he was elected in 1991, serving, concurrently, as lieutenant governor and secretary of economic development, under Governor Brereton Jones.

Four years later, Patton was elected Governor, over Larry Forgy. The major achievement of his first term was overhauling higher education, including making the state's community colleges and technical schools independent of the University of Kentucky and organizing them into the Kentucky Community and Technical College System. Shortly after Patton turned back a weak challenge to his re-election in 1999, two Democratic state senators defected to the Republican Party, giving Republicans an unprecedented majority in that legislative house. The economic prosperity that fueled Patton's first term success faded into a recession in the early 2000s. Faced with a hostile legislature and a dire economic forecast, Patton was unable to enact much significant legislation in his second term, and his situation was exacerbated, in 2002, when news of an extramarital affair and allegations of a sex-for-favors scandal broke. After initially denying the affair, Patton later admitted to it, but he continued to deny using his office to benefit his mistress. Later in his term, Patton was attacked for pardoning four of his political advisers who were indicted for violating Kentucky's campaign finance laws and for allegedly abusing his patronage powers. These successive scandals derailed any further political aspirations.

Since the death of Martha Layne Collins in November 2025, Patton is Kentucky's oldest and earliest serving former Governor. He is also the only living former Kentucky governor to have served in the 20th century.

== Early life and education ==
Patton was born in Fallsburg, Kentucky, on May 26, 1937, in a retrofitted silo with no indoor plumbing, electricity, or telephone. He was the only son of the three children born to Ward and Irene Patton. The family moved, often, because Ward Patton, a teacher, was assigned to a different school every year. When he was hired by a railroad in Pike County, he and his wife agreed that she would remain in Fallsburg with the children, until they finished school. Patton attended Fallsburg Elementary School, a four-room schoolhouse in his hometown. He was active in the 4-H club, where he began to develop his public speaking ability. In 1951, he enrolled at Louisa High School in Louisa, Kentucky. He was an honor student, a member of the drama club, a football and baseball player, and class president, during his senior year. In 1955, he graduated with the third-highest grade point average in his class of 73.

After high school, Patton attended the University of Kentucky. During the spring of 1956, he was initiated into the Kappa Sigma fraternity. Later that year, he unsuccessfully sought a seat in the Student Government Association. In 1959, he earned a Bachelor of Science degree in mechanical engineering. He was later awarded an honorary Doctor of Public Service degree from the University of Louisville.

== Career ==
=== Coal industry ===
In 1959, after graduation, Patton began work as a day laborer picking slate for the Sizemore Mining Corporation that was owned by his father-in-law. In 1961, he moved to Virgie and founded the Elkhorn Coal Company, with his brother-in-law. In 1972, he purchased Chapperal Coal Company and became extremely wealthy during the coal boom that resulted from the 1973 oil crisis. He sold Chapperal in 1978 and then helped develop Campbell Coal and Oil Supply into a major supply outlet in the eastern part of the state. He became a leader in the coal industry, serving on the board of directors of the Kentucky Coal Association, chairing the Board of the National Independent Coal Operators Association, and becoming a member of the Kentucky Deep Mine Safety Commission. He denounced the Federal Coal Mine Health and Safety Act of 1969 as "right in its diagnosis of the problem but wrong in prescription for the cure". By 1976, he had become president of the National Independent Coal Operators Association. He railed against a federal regulation that would prohibit strip mining on slopes of greater than 20 degrees, which would have effectively ended that method of mining in the Eastern Mountain Coal Fields and lamented the economic disadvantage imposed on Kentucky coal miners by the state's coal severance tax.

Patton was regarded as more moderate than most coal operators, in his relationship to labor unions. Most of his mine workers were not unionized, and those who were generally belonged to the Southern Labor Union, rather than the more confrontational United Mine Workers of America (UMWA). Members of the UMWA local at Shelby Gap maintained that Patton was arrested for clipping a striking miner on a picket line with his pickup truck in the late 1970s. Local law enforcement officials claim no recollection of the incident, and there is no record of an arrest warrant against Patton or an actual arrest.

On October 18, 1976, Patton filed for divorce from Carol Cooley, saying only that their marriage was irretrievably broken. The divorce was final on February 25, 1977. Later that year, Patton married Judi Jane Conway of Pikeville, a secretary at his Kentucky Elkhorn mine. In 1973, Conway had divorced her first husband, Bill Harvey Johnson, with whom she had two children.

=== Politics ===
Patton was introduced to politics by State Senator Kelsey Friend, who arranged for Patton to be a delegate to the 1972 Democratic National Convention. Friend also convinced Patton to help raise money for Walter "Dee" Huddleston's congressional campaign.

As the coal boom began to wane, Patton sold most of his coal interests in 1978. After a meeting with allies of his friend First District Congressman Carroll Hubbard in Madisonville on September 20, 1978, Patton considered a run for governor in 1979. However, he subsequently decided that he lacked the time to organize a campaign before the May primary election; a letter leaked to The Paducah Sun showed that he believed he was losing Hubbard's support. He joined Terry McBrayer's campaign, during the primary, and after McBrayer lost, he worked to elect John Y. Brown Jr., the Democratic nominee. Brown won the election, and Patton was appointed deputy secretary of transportation. He served only three months, before resigning to protest Brown's proposal for a coal severance tax.

In late 1981, Brown asked Patton to become vice-chair of the Kentucky Democratic Party. He would serve under Dale Sights of Henderson. Brown then informed Patton that there had been a change of plans: he had decided to appoint his father, former U.S. Representative John Y. Brown Sr. to the chair, instead of Sights. Brown's advisers convinced him that this would be politically damaging; finally, Brown appointed Patton chair, with June Taylor, daughter of former governor Ruby Laffoon, as vice-chair. The announcement was a surprise to most political observers, as Sights had been the odds-on favorite for the chairmanship. Patton served as chairman until 1983. During his tenure, he learned much about politics from Taylor and was introduced to Andrew "Skipper" Martin of Louisville, who would later become an important adviser and ally.

==== Pike County judge/executive ====
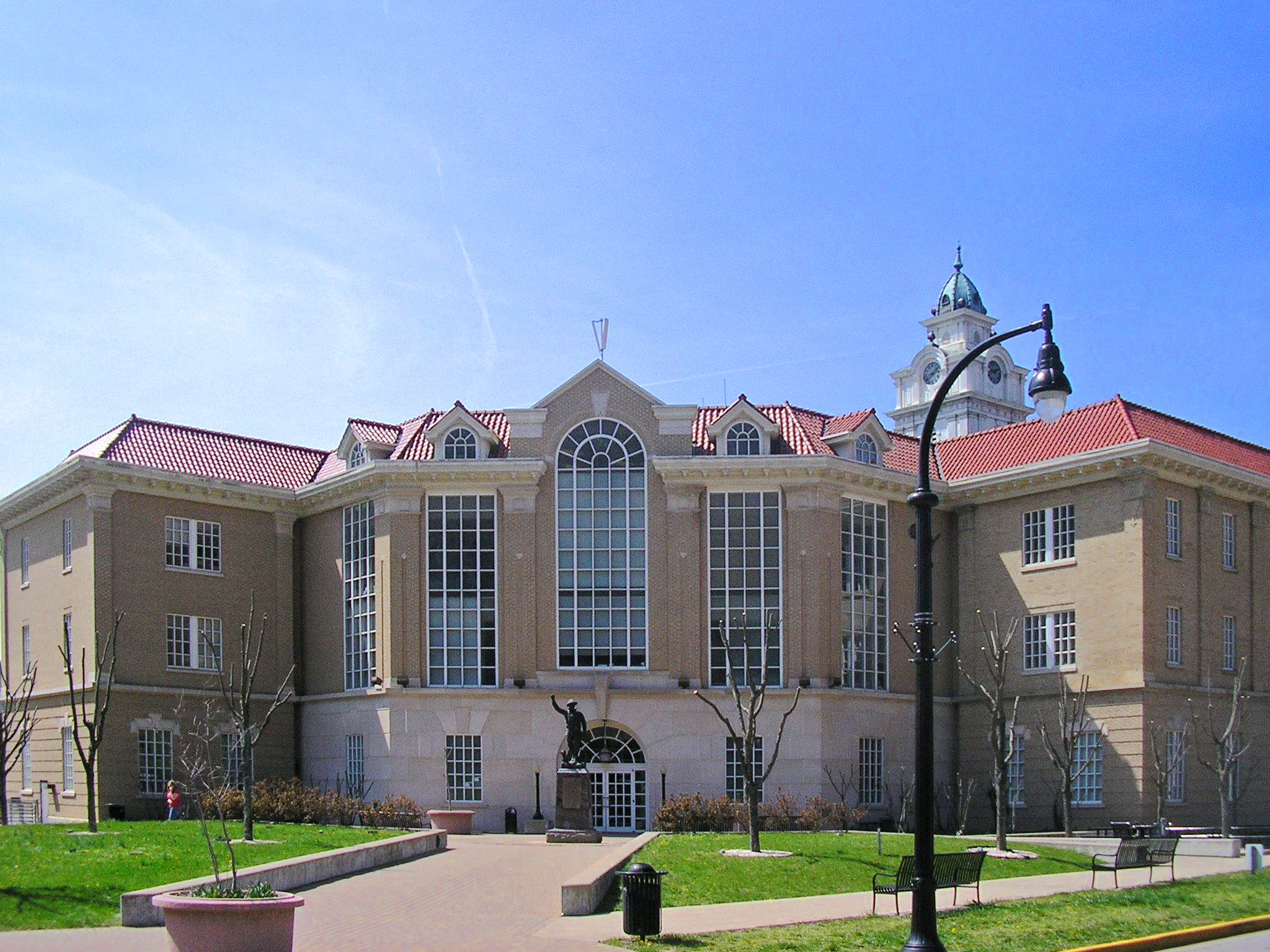
The Pike County courthouse underwent a $5 million renovation under Patton.

In 1981, Patton ran for county judge/executive of Pike County. On the way to a victory in the Democratic primary, he outspent incumbent Wayne Rutherford $191,252 to $49,000. In the general election, he garnered more than 75 percent of the vote against Republican challenger Jim Polley.

Within six months of his election, Patton instituted the state's first mandatory, county-wide garbage collection program, to combat illegal garbage dumping, which was rampant in the county. The program won Patton statewide acclaim. When Patton sought re-election in 1985, he, again, faced Rutherford in the Democratic primary. Rutherford campaigned against the garbage-collection program, promising to repeal it, if elected. This stance may have hurt him, because although some county residents resented the mandatory fee for garbage pick-up, many more recognized the benefits, as illegal dump sites became less common. Patton won the primary, again, and he went on to re-election. However, he won both races by much smaller margins than in 1981 (2,524 votes in the primary and 3,916 votes in the general election).

In his second term, Patton initiated an oil recycling program and established a work program for welfare mothers in day care centers. He oversaw construction of a new jail and a $5 million renovation to the county courthouse. He brought the county its first manufacturing company and stopped the practice of giving away gravel, drains, and bridge lumber from district warehouses to private citizens. Among his other priorities as judge/executive were the construction of rural roads and recreation facilities.

In 1987, Patton ran for Lieutenant Governor of Kentucky. In a crowded primary, his 130,713 votes placed him third, behind Brereton Jones (189,058 votes) and Attorney General David L. Armstrong (147,718 votes), but ahead of state senator David Boswell and Superintendent of Public Instruction Alice McDonald. In the most expensive primary in Kentucky history, at that point, Patton spent more than $2 million of his personal fortune, but he was outspent by Jones, who committed more than $3 million to the campaign. By comparison, Martha Layne Collins had spent $140,000 to win the office in 1979 and Steve Beshear $250,000 to win it in 1983.

Following his defeat, Patton returned to Pike County. In 1989 he was re-elected for a third term as judge/executive, receiving over 70 percent of the vote in a three-way Democratic primary and subsequently winning the general election by nearly a three-to-one margin. He immediately began preparing for another run for lieutenant governor in 1991. In the earlier campaign, the UMWA had been vociferously opposed to Patton, because employees in his coal mines had been affiliated with the Southern Labor Union. Skipper Martin introduced him to Teamsters leaders, and Patton worked with them to unionize Pike County employees. He also worked with Kelsey Friend to pass the Kentucky Rural Economic Development Act, a measure giving financial incentives to companies that located in economically depressed rural counties.

==== Lieutenant governor ====
Patton sought the office of lieutenant governor, again, in 1991. In a crowded seven-candidate field in the Democratic primary, the front runner was Attorney General Fred Cowan of Louisville. Other candidates included Steve Collins, son of former governor Martha Layne Collins, and former Speaker of the Kentucky House of Representatives Bobby H. Richardson. Just days before the primary, it was reported that Cowan's campaign had sought funds from a company that his office was investigating for criminal conduct. Patton beat Cowan by a margin of 146,102 votes to 104,337.

In the general election, Patton faced Republican Eugene Goss. Goss criticized Patton for announcing that, if elected, he would seek the governor's office at the expiration of his term. Goss insisted that he would not seek the governorship, if elected, and he maintained that using the lieutenant governor's post as a stepping stone to the governor's office was a betrayal of the office and its authority. Goss ran an unorthodox campaign, limiting individual contributions to his campaign to $300 and refusing to run television commercials. Patton went on to a lopsided victory in the general election, winning 514,023 votes to Goss's 250,857.

Upon his election as lieutenant governor, Patton resigned his office as Pike County judge-executive. While presiding over the Senate in the 1991 legislative session, Patton voted against a mandatory seat belt law, breaking a 19–19 tie. He was the last Kentucky lieutenant governor to preside over the Kentucky Senate; a 1992 amendment to the state constitution created a new position, President of the Kentucky Senate, and relieved the lieutenant governor of his duties in that body.

In November 1991, Governor Brereton Jones appointed Patton as secretary of economic development, making Patton the first lieutenant governor to serve as an appointed cabinet secretary. In this capacity, he encouraged the use of tax incentives to bring new industry to the state. Bill Bishop, a journalist for the Lexington Herald-Leader, criticized these incentives, saying that Patton, too often, used them to attract low-wage jobs. In response, Patton wrote a series of essays. While he never published them in the newspaper, he later compiled them into a book entitled Kentucky's Approach to Economic Development. He also reorganized Kentucky economic development efforts, securing the adoption of four new development incentive programs and establishing the Kentucky Economic Development Partnership.

=== 1995 gubernatorial election ===
At the expiration of his term as lieutenant governor in 1995, Patton announced his candidacy for governor. The 1995 gubernatorial election was novel, in several ways, following a 1992 constitutional amendment. It was the first election in Kentucky history in which the governor and lieutenant governor were elected as a ticket. Another new provision stated that if no candidate received at least 40 percent of the vote in his or her party's primary, a runoff election would occur between the top two candidates. Most significantly, for the first time in Kentucky history, the winners of each race would be allowed to succeed themselves in office and serve another term. Also, as a result of campaign finance reform passed under Governor Jones, candidates would receive public campaign financing and would have their campaign spending capped, negating the advantage of wealthy candidates.

Patton chose Steve Henry, a surgeon and county commissioner from Louisville, as his running mate. His major opposition in the Democratic primary came from secretary of state Bob Babbage and President Pro Tempore of the Kentucky Senate John "Eck" Rose. Although sitting governor Brereton Jones did not officially endorse Patton, Rose referred to Jones as Patton's "mentor". Rose charged that, like Jones, Patton would not take a hard stand on the issues. Referring to a nickname given to Jones in the 1991 campaign, Rose remarked "If you have liked Jell-O Jones, then you are going to be in a position to love Puddin' Paul Patton." Particularly odious to Rose was that Patton had publicly supported collective wage bargaining for public employees, but he had declared that he would not fight for it, in the upcoming 1996 legislative session. Though Babbage and Rose were political veterans and solid campaigners, Patton won 152,203 votes in the primary, well over the 40 percent needed to avoid a runoff. Babbage ran second with 81,352 votes and Rose was third with 71,740 votes. Two other candidates split the remaining 33,344 votes.

Patton entered the general election as a perceived underdog. The previous year, Republicans had taken over both the U.S. Senate and House of Representatives, and for the first time in decades, a majority of Kentucky's congressional delegation was Republican. State Democrats were also tainted by the Operation Boptrot investigation that sent many of their legislators, including House Speaker Don Blandford, to prison for political corruption. With Democrats in charge of state government for the previous 24 years, Patton feared that the "time for a change" argument would resonate with voters.

Patton's opponent, Republican Larry Forgy, hurt his campaign by aligning himself with the Christian right, alienating moderates in both parties, particularly in Louisville. He also openly opposed the Kentucky Education Reform Act (KERA), which was passed in 1990, during the administration of Wallace G. Wilkinson. Republican supporters of education reform deserted his campaign and helped form a bi-partisan coalition supporting KERA. Traditional Democratic voting blocs such as organized labor and African-Americans turned out, in force, for Patton. To further undermine Forgy, Patton reminded voters of the budget cuts by Congressional Republicans to programs affecting the elderly. These issues ultimately delivered a Patton victory of 500,787 votes to 479,227. It was the closest Kentucky gubernatorial election in 32 years, and it marked the first time an eastern Kentuckian had won the governorship since Bert T. Combs in 1959.

=== Governor of Kentucky ===
==== First term (1995–1999) ====
Though Patton had ambitions to enact education reform, early in his administration, his financial adviser, James R. Ramsey, convinced him to propose a conservative budget in the first legislative session. The two developed a plan to modernize the state government, making it more efficient. State employees were leery of increased efficiency, believing it was a code word for cutting state jobs. Patton dispelled this notion, by promising no involuntary layoffs. Patton also anticipated difficulty persuading legislators to invest an estimated $100 million in equipment and processes to realize improved efficiency. However, when economists projected a budget surplus for 1996, Patton agreed to invest half of it in capital projects, in exchange for using the other half for measures to improve government efficiency. Patton formed an Office for Technology and made improvements in the compatibility and interoperability of the state's computer systems that were recommended by his son, Chris. Investments of $23.3 million yielded a return of $300 million in state revenue. By the time Patton's efficiency program was fully implemented, the state was realizing an annual return of 75 cents for every dollar initially invested.

In December 1996, Patton called a special legislative session to consider the issue of worker's compensation reform. Both Patton and the state's legislators believed that the generous benefits, provided under Kentucky state law, created an unfavorable business climate in the state. The reform measures adopted in the special session included a substantial reduction in benefits, including those to coal miners who developed black lung disease. Patton's support of this measure alienated labor leaders, especially in eastern Kentucky's coal mining communities – which had previously been among his strongest supporters. As the law began to take effect, Patton, himself, agreed that it had gone too far, and his Secretary of Labor worked with representatives from organized labor to draft changes in the law. Those changes were eventually made in the 2002 legislative session.

===== Education reform =====
In the 1997 legislature, Patton began his mission of reforming the state's system of higher education. Noting that the state's community colleges, under the control of the University of Kentucky and technical schools, under the control of the state government, were too often competing with each other in the same community, he proposed removing the community colleges from the university's control. Part of the plan was upgrading the technical schools to colleges, allowing them to award associate's degrees, not just diplomas and certificates. Control of the community and technical colleges would be invested in a new entity, the Kentucky Community and Technical College System. Patton believed that severing the community colleges from the University of Kentucky would allow the university to reallocate resources toward becoming a "Top 20" research university in the nation. The plan also charged the University of Louisville with becoming a nationally recognized urban university. The state's Council on Postsecondary Education (CPE) would help eliminate duplication of programs among the colleges and oversee the improvements in the state's two major universities. In addition, the CPE was to oversee the formation of a "Commonwealth Virtual University" that would serve as a clearinghouse for all the distance learning opportunities offered by the colleges and universities of Kentucky. The new CPE president, Gordon K. Davies, appointed former University of Kentucky engineering faculty and then Databeam Corp. co-founder Lee T. Todd to chair the new Distance Learning Task Force which created the Kentucky Virtual University (now the Kentucky Virtual Campus) and the Kentucky Virtual Library, and worked with the Kentucky Department of Education to create the Kentucky Virtual High School (now the Kentucky Virtual Schools). Patton's plan was outlined in the Kentucky Postsecondary Education Improvement Act of 1997, nicknamed House Bill 1.

While supported by the state's smaller, regional universities, House Bill 1 immediately drew the ire of University of Kentucky president Charles T. Wethington Jr. Before becoming university president, Wethington had administered the community-college system. Most of the community colleges and the constituencies in their communities also opposed the plan. The university and the community colleges ran advertisements, encouraging opposition to the plan; Patton characterized these ads as "mean". Patton was disappointed when Greg Stumbo, a leader in the Kentucky House of Representatives and former advocate of an independent community-college system, announced his opposition the plan. Stumbo represented the community of Prestonsburg, an eastern Kentucky coal mining town, and Patton surmised that he was still angry about the worker's compensation bill. Prestonsburg was also the home of Prestonsburg Community College (now Big Sandy Community and Technical College). In the face of this opposition, Patton negotiated with individual legislators, until he was convinced that he had a majority in both houses of the Kentucky General Assembly. He, then, pushed forward and was able to get the legislation passed.

In addition to this victory, Patton also secured passage of other higher education measures. In the 1998 legislative session, he proposed a $100 million bond issue to fund the Research Challenge Trust Fund, a fund that the state's universities could tap to hire researchers for special projects. The program, later nicknamed "Bucks for Brains,” required the universities to match any resources leveraged from the fund, dollar-for-dollar. The 1998 legislature also approved funding for the Kentucky Educational Excellence Scholarship (KEES) program, which channeled money from the Kentucky Lottery into a special fund for scholarships. To qualify for a KEES scholarship, students have to score at least a 2.5 grade point average in high school and attend a college or university in Kentucky. Awards are made on a sliding scale, with factors such as high school grades, scores on college entrance exams, and continued academic success in college affecting the amount of the award, which is renewable for up to eight college terms.

Patton's education reforms were not confined to higher education. He also sought to make changes to the Kentucky Education Reform Act (KERA) that would mollify its critics, without gutting the law, itself. One of the major complaints, regarding KERA, was the inability to compare the scores to those from other states, to determine progress relative to the rest of the nation. Opponents of KERA in the Senate passed a bill to eliminate the testing, until something better could be implemented. In the House, a more moderate measure was advanced, which added a component to the testing system that would allow students to be compared to national norms. Patton supported the House version of the bill, which ultimately emerged from the conference committee and was enacted into law. The administration's strong support of KERA kept the legislation from being seriously challenged, again, during Patton's term. One notable exception occurred in 2000, when legislators tried to repeal the anti-nepotism provision regarding school hiring. The measure passed both houses of the legislature, but Patton vetoed it.

The passage of his higher education reforms led to Patton becoming the chairman of the Southern Regional Education Board from 1997 to 1998. In 1999, he was chosen chairman of the Education Commission of the States. Other educational organizations, then, sought Patton's leadership; he chaired the National Education Goals Panel and was chosen by the U.S. Secretary of Education to lead a commission to study the high-school senior year.

In the 1998 legislative session, the state enjoyed a $200 million budget surplus. Patton was able to distribute this surplus to legislative allies, giving him substantial leverage for his proposals. As one legislative leader opined, "Money buys a lot of silence." Legislators were also reluctant to oppose the administration for fear that Patton would be re-elected in 1999. Consequently, Patton was able to gain approval of a very ambitious legislative agenda in 1998, including tougher criminal laws, improved economic development, reform for Medicaid, and further reform of the higher-education system. Patton also used some of the budget surplus to provide computers for public classrooms. Because of Patton's commitment to education, Kentucky was the first state in the nation to have every public school classroom wired to the Internet. Once this was accomplished, Patton charged his education secretary, Ed Ford, with developing the Kentucky Virtual High School, a system of distance education that would allow students in smaller high schools in Kentucky to have access to courses in foreign languages and other subjects offered only at larger high schools. The virtual high school was brought online m, in January 2000.

The last plank in Patton's education platform was the improvement of adult education. This issue allowed him to work with a political foe, Republican senator David L. Williams, who had been pushing for additional resources for adult education since 1997. In 1998, Patton personally chaired a task force on adult education, and 18 months later, the task force's recommendations were incorporated into a bill sponsored by Williams. The bill, which increased and equalized funding and tied continuing funds to successful performance by individual adult-education programs, passed both houses of the General Assembly, unanimously. By 2003, the number of adults completing their GED rose by 17 percent, and the number of GED recipients who matriculated to college rose from 13 percent to 18 percent.

===== Criminal justice reform =====
Also on Patton's agenda was a reformation of Kentucky's juvenile justice system. Under Brereton Jones, because of its system of housing and treating juvenile offenders, Kentucky had been one of only two states unable to qualify for federal grants. Among the problems cited by the Department of Justice were abuse of juveniles by state employees and failure to hold juvenile and adult offenders separately from each other. Governor Jones entered into a consent decree, to ameliorate the situation, but his term expired before he could meaningfully address the terms of the decree. Patton went beyond the terms of the decree by implementing mandatory training for state employees who dealt with juvenile offenders and by setting up a hotline for juveniles to report abuse, anonymously. He shifted the responsibility for housing juveniles from local communities to the state, constructing nine new juvenile detention centers. In January 2001, Attorney General Janet Reno proclaimed Kentucky's juvenile justice system a model for the nation.

Patton did not stop with the juvenile justice system, however. He encouraged passage of a bill that required that violent offenders serve at least 85 percent of their sentences (up from the 50 percent previously mandated), while requiring that judges consider home incarceration for first-time, non-violent offenders. The bill also allowed judges to sentence criminals to life without parole; previously, life without parole for 25 years had been the harshest non-capital sentence. The bill passed the legislature in 1999.

==== 1999 gubernatorial election ====
Due to the constitutional amendment enacted under previous governor Brereton Jones, Patton became the first governor in more than 200 years eligible to succeed himself in office. James Garrard had served consecutive terms in 1796 and 1800, but the Kentucky Constitution of 1799 barred any future governor from being elected to consecutive terms. In 1796, Garrard was chosen as governor by an electoral college, not by popular vote, and thus Patton was the first Kentucky governor to be popularly elected for consecutive terms.

Patton was unopposed in the Democratic primary. Republicans nominated Peppy Martin, who many considered a weak candidate. In fact, Patton's old Republican foe, David Williams, announced he would vote for Patton over Martin. In the general election Patton garnered 352,099 votes, 60.6 percent of the total. Martin finished with 128,788 votes, with 88,930 votes going to third-party candidate Gatewood Galbraith. When asked why the Republicans had chosen such a weak challenger, Patton opined "They mistakenly believed I could not be beaten. They made a mistake."

==== Second term as governor ====
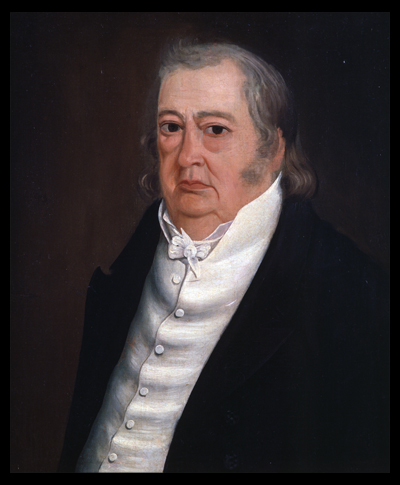
James Garrard was the only Kentucky governor to succeed himself in office prior to Patton, doing so in 1800.

After the gubernatorial election in 1999, Louisville senator Dan Seum announced he would change his party affiliation from Democrat to Republican, citing his conservative voting history, including opposition to the state lottery, KERA, and abortion. This switch, which Patton learned of too late to intervene, equalized the number of Democrats and Republicans in the Senate. Six weeks later, Paducah senator Bob Leeper announced he would also change his party affiliation. Patton traveled to Paducah and met with Leeper, but he was unable to convince him to remain a Democrat. Leeper had a history of conflict with Democratic Senate President Larry Saunders, but he insisted his party switch, like Seum's, was based on political philosophy. Leeper's switch gave Republicans a majority in the Senate, for the first time in the state's history. David Williams was elected President of the Senate, and he held the Republican majority together, effectively. Consequently, Patton faced a difficult task in maneuvering his agenda through a divided General Assembly.

The rift between Williams and Patton became permanent, during negotiations over the state budget in 1999. Patton proposed to Williams a 7-cent-per-gallon gasoline tax, with 1 cent of every 7 dedicated to counties with the most unpaved roads – usually heavily Republican counties ignored by past Democratic governors. Patton claimed Williams told him he had 10 votes in the Senate for the increase. But gas prices spiked, before the measure came to a vote in the Senate, and Williams failed to deliver his votes, after the House passed the tax. The administration and key Republican senators reached a compromise that saved Patton's budget, with tax changes that were mostly revenue-neutral. Patton believed Williams had deliberately misled him, however, and the two never reconciled.

Another issue confronting both Patton and the legislature was how to spend federal funds from the Tobacco Master Settlement Agreement. Kentucky's share of the settlement totaled $3.5 billion over 25 years. Because tobacco was a major cash crop in Kentucky, Patton proposed that half of the settlement be used to diversify the state's farmers' crops. One-fourth of the money would support health care and anti-smoking efforts. The remaining one-fourth would address early-childhood care and education, a cause important to Patton's daughter, Nikki, an early-childhood educator.

In November 2000, Kentucky voters approved a constitutional amendment providing a shorter legislative session in odd-numbered years, with longer sessions in even-numbered years. Most of Patton's proposals failed, in the 2000 and 2001 legislative sessions. The economic boom that had provided ample funds for his programs, during the first term, slowed in 2001, and by 2002, the state was $800 million short of meeting its budget. In 2002, Republicans in the General Assembly called for an end to public campaign finance, as an economy measure. Calling it "welfare for politicians,” Republicans estimated that abolishing public campaign finance could save the state $30 million. Ultimately, the issue derailed the biennial budget, during the regular legislative session. In April 2002, Patton called a special legislative session to approve the budget, but legislators were still unable to agree. For the first time in the state's history, the fiscal year began without a budget. This left Patton to run the state government, for a year, without a budget in place.

Besides the budget, another measure that failed to pass in the 2002 session was a bill to eliminate the death penalty for juveniles. The precedent for the juvenile death penalty had been set in the 1989 Supreme Court case of Stanford v. Kentucky, wherein the court ruled that Kevin Stanford could be executed for the 1981 rape, sodomy, and murder of a gas station attendant in Jefferson County, Kentucky, even though Stanford was only 17 at the time of the crime. In 2003, Patton announced he would commute Stanford's sentence. Patton did oversee the execution of two adult prisoners, that of Harold McQueen Jr. in 1997 and Eddie Lee Harper in 1999, making him the first Kentucky governor to do so since 1962.

===== Tina Conner sex scandal =====
Already plagued by an uncooperative legislature, Patton's situation was exacerbated, in 2002, when it was revealed that, during his first term in office, he had engaged in an extramarital affair with a woman named Tina Conner. According to Conner, the operator of Birchtree Healthcare nursing home in Clinton, Kentucky, the relationship ended in 1999, but Patton continued to call her, until she completely broke off the affair in October 2001. After initially denying the affair, Patton tearfully admitted to it, during a televised press conference at the Kentucky History Center on September 20, 2002. The story made Patton the object of state and national ridicule, and the subject of jokes by Jay Leno on The Tonight Show. The Louisville Courier-Journal called for Patton's resignation, stating that he was "too damaged, as a moral authority, to lead ... [and] too powerless, as a politician, to compel."

Conner alleged that Patton arranged regulatory favors for the nursing home, while the affair was ongoing. Two months after Conner said she ended the affair, Birchtree Healthcare was cited by state regulators for numerous violations of health and safety rules. By July 2002, the state had pulled all Medicare and Medicaid payments from the facility, which soon went bankrupt. Conner further alleged that the state investigation of Birchtree was retaliation, by Patton, for her ending of the affair.

In a separate incident, Conner claimed that Patton helped a construction company she owned obtain certification as a disadvantaged business, which gave the company special preference when bidding for state contracts.

The affair appeared to take a toll on Patton's marriage. His wife, Judi, was reported to be living in separate quarters in the governor's mansion and was rarely seen in public with him.

Patton had risen to national prominence, successively chairing the Southern Governors Association, the Democratic Governors Association, and the National Governors Association (NGA). He was serving as NGA chair, at the time the Tina Conner scandal broke, and he planned to resign his chairmanship in November 2002. Nevertheless, the other governors rallied around him, convincing him to remain in the position. Together, with his Republican vice-chair, Idaho's Dirk Kempthorne, Patton led the NGA effectively, securing federal funding to shore up state budgets and keeping the caucus from a partisan split in a vote over Medicaid.

Conner filed suit against Patton, in September 2002. By late 2003, all but one of her charges against Patton had been dismissed; the remaining charge alleged "outrageous" conduct. In March 2003, the state's Executive Branch Ethics Commission investigated Conner's claims and accused Patton of four ethics violations, charging that he "used or attempted to use his official position" to provide favors for Conner. The favors included contacting the state transportation secretary, with regard to Conner's disadvantaged business application, recommending a promotion for an officer who allegedly helped Conner avoid paying a traffic ticket, appointing Conner to the board of directors for the Kentucky Lottery, and appointing Conner's then-husband to the Agricultural Development Board. Patton claimed that the favors he requested for Conner were the same kind of favors that he had requested for dozens of influential constituents. He also claimed he had not profited, financially, from any of the requested favors. He maintained that his attitude toward constituent services was "If you can do so legally and ethically, help them."

Tina Conner's final claim against Patton – for "outrage" – was dismissed by a judge in May 2006. In October 2006, Conner filed a second lawsuit against Patton, alleging misconduct by a public official and government oppression; a Franklin County judge dismissed the suit, claiming it was an attempt, by Conner, to re-litigate the claims from her first suit.

===== Loss of legislative influence =====
Because of the deteriorating national economic situation, Kentucky faced a severe budget shortfall, in 2003. Patton proposed an overhaul of the state tax system, whereby tax revenue would keep pace with the state's eventual economic recovery. However, such reform would necessarily have meant tax increases, and with the 2003 gubernatorial election looming, legislators from both parties strictly stuck to a pledge not to raise taxes. Consequently, in the 2003 legislative session, members of the General Assembly crafted a budget that completely disregarded any input from Patton. The budget included repealing the campaign finance reform bill, passed a decade earlier. Patton conceded "I have lost any ability to influence the legislature."

===== Patronage accusations =====
During his final months in office, Patton drew criticism for abusing his patronage power. Critics charged that he had appointed several of his family and friends who were in non-merit system jobs to merit system positions, increasing their chances of being retained when a new administration took over. These charges were particularly damaging because, earlier in the year, the General Assembly had ordered Patton to cut 800 non-merit positions to help balance the budget. The Lexington Herald-Leader opined that these charges were more serious than those of the Conner affair. Patton maintained that his friends had followed proper personnel protocol, in applying for and securing merit positions.

===== Campaign finance pardons =====
In June 2003, Patton issued pardons to four men who were under indictment for violating campaign finance laws during the 1995 gubernatorial race. The indictments stemmed from charges by then-candidate Larry Forgy that Patton had skirted campaign finance laws by coordinating expenditures with the Teamsters and the state Democratic Party. A Franklin County grand jury returned the indictments in 1998, but a circuit court judge dismissed them, in 1999, on grounds that the campaign finance law was too vague. An appeals court reversed that decision, the following year, and in 2003, the Kentucky Supreme Court upheld the indictments by a vote of 5–1. The Supreme Court of the United States refused to hear an appeal on June 13, 2003. Two days later, Patton issued pardons for all four men. State attorney general Ben Chandler lamented that the pardons would eliminate the possibility of determining whether Patton won the 1995 contest "honestly and openly.”

=== Later career ===
Patton had publicly stated that he was planning a run against Republican U.S. Senator Jim Bunning, in 2004, but the scandals that plagued him, near the end of his administration, derailed those plans. He retired to Pikeville, Kentucky, after the election of his successor, Republican Ernie Fletcher. He became a member of the First Presbyterian Church of Pikeville, a member of the Big Sandy Regional Economic Development Board, and chairman of the Pikeville/Pike County Industrial and Economic Authority.

Governor Ernie Fletcher renamed a section of U.S. Route 119, in eastern Kentucky, as the Paul E. Patton Highway at a ceremony on October 30, 2008. On February 1, 2009, Patton was chosen chairman of the Kentucky Council on Postsecondary Education (CPE). On August 12, 2009, he was announced as the next president of Pikeville College (now, the University of Pikeville). In September 2009, the Executive Branch Ethics Commission issued an advisory opinion that Patton could serve in both roles without a significant conflict of interest, because the CPE wields scant oversight of Kentucky's private colleges. Patton was advised to allow someone other than himself to be the official liaison between the University of Pikeville and the CPE and to recuse himself from CPE discussions on matters "that directly involve his private institution or that would affect his institution, differently, than any other similarly situated private postsecondary institution."

=== University of Pikeville ===
Patton was formally installed as president of the University of Pikeville on February 16, 2010. He also serves as a Distinguished Visiting Lecturer in Public Policy and Leadership. As president, Patton oversaw the construction of the Expo Center, a new facility to house the university's indoor sports; in 2011, the center's basketball court was named Paul E. Patton Court.

In late 2011, Patton announced that he and Speaker of the Kentucky House of Representatives Greg Stumbo would ask the General Assembly to consider adding the University of Pikeville as the ninth state-supported university in the Kentucky university system. On December 30, 2011, he announced his resignation from the Council on Postsecondary Education, to avoid any potential accusations of a conflict of interest regarding the proposal in the 2012 General Assembly.

In 2013, Patton announced he would step down as president of the university and instead serve as chancellor. Because of his longstanding support of the university's athletics programs, he was inducted into the university's Athletics Hall of Fame, in 2014. In January 2015, the university announced it would move its teacher training program out of the College of Arts and Sciences, creating the new Patton College of Education. The college was scheduled to open for the fall 2015 semester.

== Personal life ==
Following his sophomore year of college, he married Carol Cooley, daughter of a Floyd County, Kentucky, coal mine operator. They had two children together – Nikki and Christopher.

== See also ==
- List of 4-H alumni
- List of Kappa Sigma members
- List of University of Kentucky alumni
- List of Democratic nominees for Governor of Kentucky
- List of governors of Kentucky
- List of Hillary Clinton 2008 presidential campaign endorsements

Party political offices
Preceded by Brereton Jones	Democratic nominee for Lieutenant Governor of Kentucky; 1991	Succeeded by Steve Henry
Preceded by Brereton Jones	Democratic nominee for Governor of Kentucky; 1995, 1999	Succeeded by Ben Chandler
Preceded by Frank O'Bannon	Chair of the Democratic Governors Association; 1999–2000	Succeeded by Gray Davis
Political offices
Preceded by Brereton Jones	Lieutenant Governor of Kentucky; 1991–1995	Succeeded by Steve Henry
Preceded by Brereton Jones	Governor of Kentucky; 1995–2003	Succeeded by Ernie Fletcher
Preceded by John Engler	Chair of the National Governors Association; 2002–2003	Succeeded by Dirk Kempthorne
U.S. order of precedence (ceremonial)
Preceded by Martha McSally as Former U.S. Senator	Order of precedence of the United States; Within Kentucky	Succeeded by Ernie Fletcher as Former Governor
Preceded by Peter Shumlin as Former Governor	Order of precedence of the United States; Outside Kentucky	Succeeded by Ernie Fletcher as Former Governor
