= Robert H. Foglesong =

US Air Force general

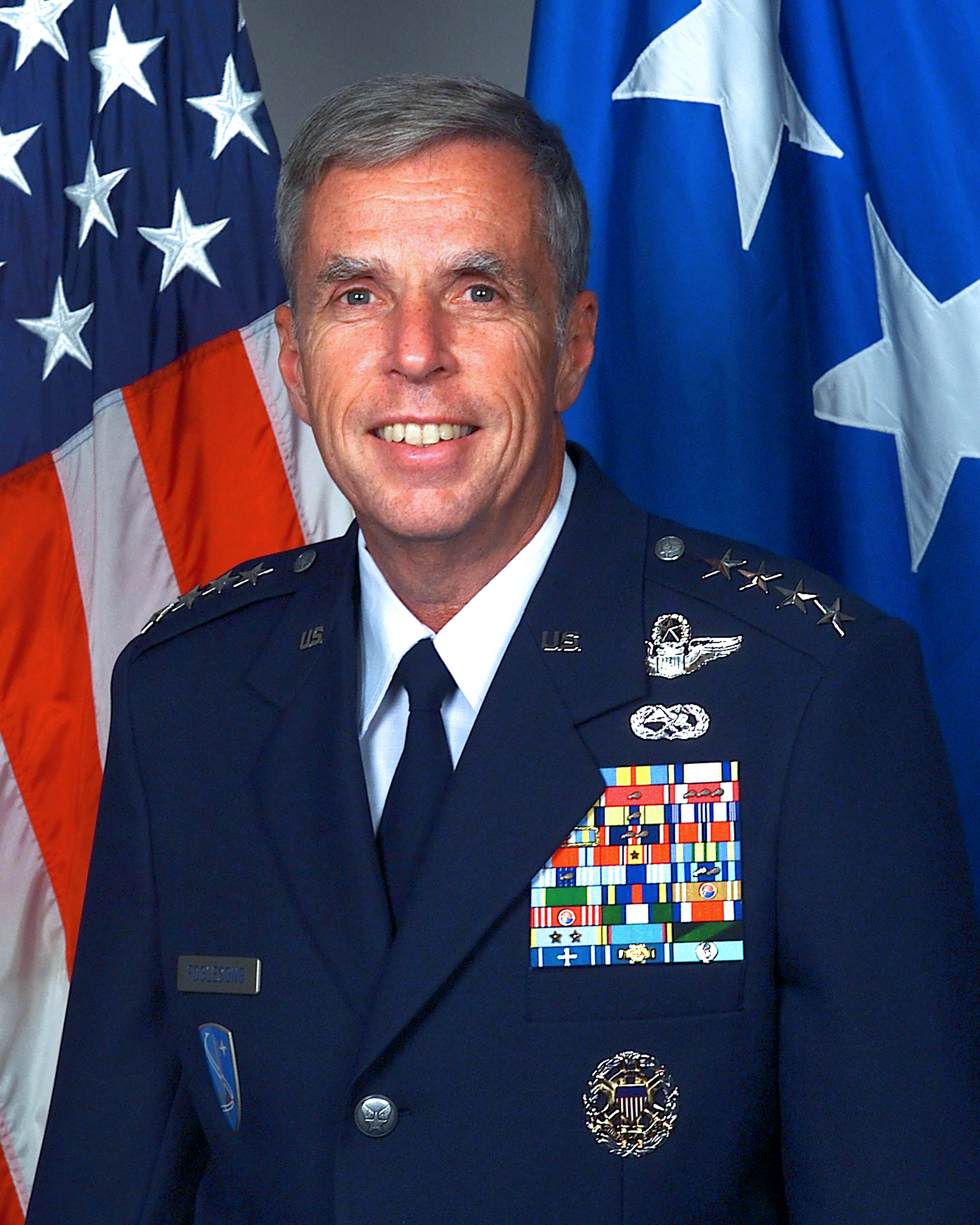
- Born: 13 July 1945 (age 81); Williamson, West Virginia, U.S.
- Military career
- Allegiance: United States of America
- Branch: United States Air Force
- Service years: 1972–2006
- Rank: General
- Commands: U.S. Air Forces in Europe (USAFE); Vice Chief of Staff of the U.S. Air Force
- Conflicts: none
- Awards: Defense Distinguished Service Medal (2); Air Force Distinguished Service Medal (2); Defense Superior Service Medal; Sam Il Korean National Security Medal; Cheon-Su Korean National Security Medal; Medalla De Oro por Servicio Distinguido, El Salvador (Gold Medal for Distinguished Service); Mérito Aeronáutico, Uruguay (Aeronautical Merit); Mérito Aeronáutico, Bolivia; Cruz de la Fuerza Aérea al "Mérito Aeronáutico", Colombia (Air Force Cross of Aeronautical Merit, Grand Cross class); Cruz de las Fuerzas Armadas, Honduras (Armed Forces Cross); Cruz de la Fuerza Aérea, Guatemala; Cruz Peruana al Mérito Aeronáutico, clase Gran Cruz, Perú (Peruvian Cross of Aeronautical Merit, Great Cross category); La Medalla Legion al Mérito Confraternidad Aérea Interamericana, (System of Cooperation Among the American Air Forces Legion of Merit)
- Other work: President of Mississippi State University

General Robert H. "Doc" Foglesong, USAF, Ret., (born 13 July 1945), formerly of Williamson, West Virginia, is a former president of Mississippi State University. He served in the United States Air Force from April 1972 until retirement as general in February 2006.

== Education ==
Foglesong earned the degrees BSc, MSc and PhD at West Virginia University in chemical engineering in 1968, 1969 and 1971 respectively. He holds an honorary Doctorate in Strategic Intelligence, and is a Distinguished Alumnus of West Virginia University. He was selected by the West Virginia Education Alliance as a Graduate of Distinction, and was selected by the West Virginia Executive Magazine as the Patriot of the Year for 2005.

== Air Force career ==
Foglesong attained the rank of four-star general in the United States Air Force 5 November 2001, retiring 1 February 2006 from active duty after 33 years of service. His last post was as Commander of U.S. Air Forces in Europe and of Allied Air Component Command Ramstein where the service's enlisted corps honored him with the Order of the Sword. General Foglesong commanded six times during his Air Force service including flying and maintenance units, a Numbered Air Force, and a Major Command. During his final command, General Foglesong continued his established model of using multiple "Combat" programs throughout his command to focus on military discipline and service standards including facilities maintenance, physical readiness, and leadership and mentoring. While a few Airman saw merit and value of these "Combat" Programs as a renewed emphasis on pride, espirit, and mission; most Airmen sounded their displeasure. Shortly after his retirement, his successor led an effort to reshape these programs begun under Foglesong, dropping two programs, eliminating the "Combat" moniker, and delegating responsibility for 10 of the programs to base and wing commanders.

== Awards and decorations ==
US Air Force Command Pilot Badge
Basic Maintenance and Munitions Badge
Office of the Joint Chiefs of Staff Identification Badge
Allied Air Command Badge

Defense Distinguished Service Medal with one bronze oak leaf cluster
Air Force Distinguished Service Medal with bronze oak leaf cluster
Defense Superior Service Medal
Legion of Merit with oak leaf cluster
Meritorious Service Medal with three oak leaf clusters
Aerial Achievement Medal with two oak leaf clusters
Air Force Commendation Medal with oak leaf cluster
Air Force Achievement Medal
Joint Meritorious Unit Award with oak leaf cluster
Air Force Outstanding Unit Award with two oak leaf clusters
Air Force Organizational Excellence Award with oak leaf cluster
Combat Readiness Medal
National Defense Service Medal with one bronze service star
Global War on Terrorism Expeditionary Medal
Global War on Terrorism Service Medal
Korea Defense Service Medal
Military Outstanding Volunteer Service Medal
Air Force Overseas Short Tour Service Ribbon with oak leaf cluster
Air Force Overseas Long Tour Service Ribbon
Air Force Longevity Service Award with silver and two bronze oak leaf clusters
Small Arms Expert Marksmanship Ribbon
Air Force Training Ribbon
Order of National Security Merit, Sam-il Medal (Korea)
Order of National Security Merit, Cheon-Su Medal (Korea)
El Salvador Gold Medal for Distinguished Services
Aeronautical Merit Medal (Uruguay)
Bolivian Order of Aeronautical Merit, Commander
Air Force Cross of Aeronautical Merit, Grand Cross (Colombia)
Honduran Armed Forces Cross
Air Force Cross (Guatemala)
Grand Cross of Aeronautical Merit (Peru)
SICOFAA Legion of Merit, Officer

== After retirement ==
Foglesong was President of Mississippi State University from 2006 to 31 March 2008. Foglesong was the second retired general to hold the office of president at the university; Confederate lieutenant general Stephen D. Lee was the first. Foglesong tackled a number of competing internal and external agendas that he saw as undermining the school's purpose of delivering a quality education to its students. Under pressure from politicians, students and faculty, he resigned in March 2008. During his tenure enrollment rose 6% from 16,206 to 17,127 in 2008. He also oversaw a significant change to the school's facilities and grounds involving removal of longstanding traditional landscaping including removal of daffodil bulbs which had been on the campus for decades. Much of this landscaping was seen as destructive and shortsighted in nature by students and faculty. Foglesong founded a scholarship program in West Virginia called the Appalachian Leadership and Educational Foundation in 2006. He helped to establish the Appalachian Leadership Honors Program at Mississippi State, which now goes by the name Montgomery Leadership Program in honor of former congressman Sonny Montgomery in 2006. He has also served as a director of now defunct Massey Energy, a major coal company which closed after flagrant safety violations during his tenure.

== See also ==
- List of commanders of USAFE

Military offices
Preceded by John W. Handy	Vice Chief of Staff of the United States Air Force; 2001–2003	Succeeded by T. Michael Moseley
Academic offices
Preceded by J. Charles Lee	President of Mississippi State University; 2006–2008	Succeeded by Mark E. Keenum
