= Hugh Critz =

University president

Hugh Critz (December 21, 1876 – 1939) was the president of the Mississippi Agricultural and Mechanical College from 1930–1934. It was during his tenure that the Mississippi Legislature renamed the school Mississippi State University. Prior to that he had served as president of Arkansas Tech University.

== Honors ==
Critz Hall at Mississippi State is named in his honor.

Academic offices
Preceded by D. G. Armstrong	President of Arkansas Tech University; 1918–1924	Succeeded by Charles G. Lueker
Preceded by Buz M. Walker	President of Mississippi State University; 1930–1934	Succeeded by George Duke Humphrey
