= Buz M. Walker =

University president and math professor

- Born: August 20, 1863; Oktibbeha County, Mississippi, U.S.
- Died: August 21, 1949 (aged 86)
- Occupation: University Professor

Buz M. Walker (August 20, 1863 – August 21, 1949) was a mathematics professor and the President of the Mississippi Agricultural and Mechanical College (now Mississippi State University) from 1925 to 1930. The Walker Engineering building at Mississippi State is named in his honor. He was an instructor at the school from 1883 to 1884, an assistant professor of mathematics from 1888 to 1927, dean of the engineering school from 1922 to 1925, and vice president of the university from 1913 to 1925. He was also involved with the school's athletics, a regular member of the Southern Intercollegiate Athletic Association, and its president around the time of World War I.

He graduated from Mississippi A&M with the class of 1883. From 1885 to 1887 Walker attended the University of Virginia and studied under professor William M. Thornton.

== Mathematics ==
Buz M. Walker achieved worldwide distinction in 1906 with a University of Chicago dissertation "On the Resolution of the Higher Singularities of Algebraic Curves Into Ordinary Nodes", supervised by Oskar Bolza. Walker was an Invited Speaker of the ICM in 1936 in Oslo.

Academic offices
Preceded by David Carlisle Hull	President of Mississippi State University; 1925–1930	Succeeded by Hugh Critz
