= List of presidents of Mississippi State University =

The following persons are, or were, the president of Mississippi State University.

== Presidents of Mississippi A&M (1880–1932) ==
#	Name	Term
1	General Stephen D. Lee	1880–1899
2	John M. Stone	1899–1900
3	John Crumpton Hardy	1900–1912
4	George Robert Hightower	1912–1916
5	William Hall Smith	1916–1920
6	David Carlisle Hull (Note: Alumni)	1920–1925
7	Buz M. Walker	1925–1930
8	Hugh Critz (Note: Hugh Critz was president when the Mississippi Legislature changed the name from Mississippi A&M to Mississippi State College.)	1930–1932

== Presidents of Mississippi State College (1932–1958) ==
#	Name	Term
8 (cont.)	Hugh Critz	1932–1934
9	George Duke Humphrey	1934–1945
10	Fred Tom Mitchell	1945–1953
11	Benjamin F. Hilbun (Note: Benjamin F. Hilbun was president when the Mississippi Legislature again changed the name from Mississippi State College to Mississippi State University in 1958 after the Mississippi State gained university status.)	1953–1958

== Presidents of Mississippi State University (1958–present) ==
#	Name	Term
11 (cont.)	Benjamin F. Hilbun	1958–1960
12	Dean W. Colvard	1960–1966
13	William L. Giles	1966–1976
14	James Douglas McComas	1976–1985
	Harvey S. Lewis (interim)	(Spring 1985)
15	Donald W. Zacharias	1985–1997
16	Malcolm Portera	1998–2001
17	J. Charles Lee	2002–2006
18	Gen. Robert H. Foglesong (Note: On Friday, March 7, 2008 Robert "Doc" Foglesong officially resigned from his position as President of Mississippi State. He resigned for the "express purpose of helping the university move forward.")	2006–2008
	Vance Watson (Note: On Thursday, March 20, 2008, Dr. L. Stacy Davidson, Jr., President of the Mississippi Board of Trustees of State Institutions of Higher Learning (IHL), announced that the Board unanimously named Dr. Vance H. Watson as the Interim President at Mississippi State University.") (interim)	2008
	Roy H. Ruby (Note: On October 20, 2008 "During its emergency teleconference, the Board of Trustees of State Institutions of Higher Learning accepted the resignation of Mississippi State University Interim President Dr. Vance Watson, effective immediately...The Board also announced that long-time MSU Vice President Dr. Roy H. Ruby would serve as Interim President") (interim)	2008–2009
19	Mark E. Keenum	2009–present
