= William L. Giles =

William Lincoln Giles (July 5, 1911 – May 13, 1997) was president of Mississippi State University from 1966 to 1976. Giles was born in Oklahoma and grew up in Little Rock, Arkansas. He earned bachelor's and master's degrees at the University of Arkansas and a Ph.D. in botany at the University of Missouri.

== Early life and career ==
Giles served in the army during World War II, and worked at the Soil Conservation Service in Kansas and the Agricultural research Center in Maryland before coming to Mississippi State University in 1949. At that time is served as the University's Seed Technology Laboratory manager, a position he kept for three years before moving to the Delta Branch Experiment Station in Stoneville, MS. He was appointed the Vice President for Agriculture and Forestry at MSU in 1961.

In the 1960s, Giles garnered numerous awards and accolades. These included being names the "Man of the Year in Agriculture" by Progressive Farmer in 1960 and the "Conservationist of the Year" by the American Society of Soil Conservation in 1963.

In 1966, he was elected the 13th president of Mississippi State University. During his tenure, he was responsible for a large building program that included the addition of a new student union, chapel (built from the remains of Old Main), student health center and over 35 academic buildings that were either constructed, enlarged or renovated. Enrollment also increased from 8,000 to 12,000 students.

== Later life ==
Bill Giles retired in 1976 to his farm near Starkville, MS. He was married to Jean Presson Giles. They had one daughter, Ginger, and two sons, Richard and John. Giles died on May 13, 1997, at the age of 85.

== Honors ==
The William L. Giles Distinguished Professor Award at Mississippi is named in his honor. Giles Hall which houses the Mississippi State University College of Architecture, Art, and Design is named in his honor.

Academic offices
Preceded by Dean W. Colvard	President of Mississippi State University; 1966–1976	Succeeded by James D. McComas
