= William Hall Smith =

William Hall Smith (February 8, 1866 – after 1920) was the President of the Mississippi Agricultural and Mechanical College, now Mississippi State University, from 1916 to 1920. Smith was born near Vernon in Lamar County, Alabama. He was a member of the first Board of Trustees of Mississippi Normal College, now known as the University of Southern Mississippi, and was elected first president of that institution during the period of its construction. Smith Hall at Mississippi State was formerly named in his honor (the building has since been demolished).

Academic offices
Preceded by George Robert Hightower	President of Mississippi State University; 1916-1920	Succeeded by David Carlisle Hull
