= J. Charles Lee =

J. Charles Lee was the President of Mississippi State University from 2002 to 2006. Lee served one year as interim university president before being named to the position on a permanent basis on January 17, 2003.

== Prior Work ==
Prior to becoming interim president in 2002, Lee had been Mississippi State's vice president for agriculture, forestry, and veterinary medicine since 1999. He also served as dean of the College of Agriculture and Life Sciences beginning July 2000. From 1978 to 1983, he was dean of the School of Forest Resources and associate director of the Mississippi Agricultural and Forestry Experiment Station at MSU. In addition to his MSU positions, Lee has held administrative positions at the University of Arkansas at Monticello, where he served as head of the forestry department; and at Texas A&M University, where he held positions including head of the department of forest science, dean and executive associate dean, College of Agriculture and Life Sciences, director of the Agricultural Experiment Station, and deputy chancellor of the Texas A&M University System. Lee also served for 18 months as interim executive vice president and provost of Texas A&M.

Academic offices
Preceded by Malcolm Portera	President of Mississippi State University; 2002-2006	Succeeded by General Robert H. Foglesong
