= George Duke Humphrey =

George Duke Humphrey (August 30, 1897 – September 10, 1973) was the President of the Mississippi State College (now Mississippi State University) from 1934 to 1945. He then became the president of the University of Wyoming from 1945 to 1964.

== Honors ==
The University of Wyoming has an annual faculty teaching award named in his honor.

The Humphrey Coliseum at Mississippi State is named in his honor.

== See also ==
- University of Wyoming
- List of presidents of Mississippi State University

Academic offices
Preceded by Hugh Critz	President of Mississippi State University; 1934–1945	Succeeded by Fred Tom Mitchell
Preceded by James L. Morrill	President of University of Wyoming; 1945–1964	Succeeded by John T. Fey
