= Humphrey Coliseum =

Basketball arena at Mississippi State University

- "The Hump"
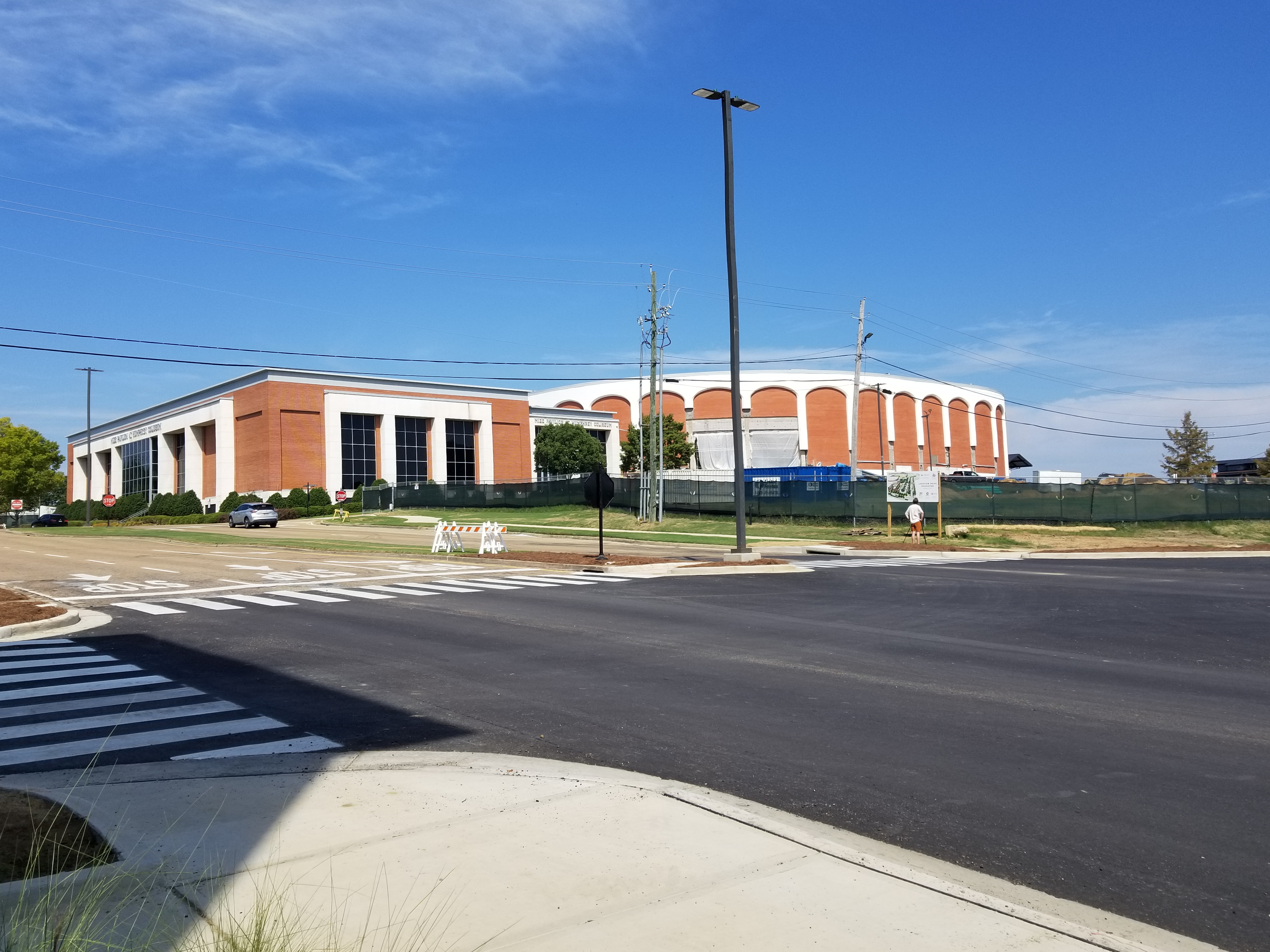
- Interactive map of Humphrey Coliseum
- Location: 55 Coliseum Boulevard; Starkville, MS 39762
- Coordinates: 33°27′42″N 88°47′40″W
- Owner: Mississippi State University
- Operator: Mississippi State University
- Capacity: 9,100 (2023–present) 10,575 (2011–2022); 10,500 (1998–2011); 9,419 (1975–1998)
- Surface: Northern Hard Maple

Construction
- Groundbreaking: September 1973
- Opened: December 1, 1975
- Cost: $6 million ($35.9 million in 2025 dollars)
- Architects: Brewer, Godbold and Associates, Ltd.
- General contractors: Gresham, Williams & Johnson Co.

Tenants
- Mississippi State Bulldogs Men's Basketball; Mississippi State Bulldogs Women's Basketball

Humphrey Coliseum is a 9,100-seat multi-purpose arena located on the campus of Mississippi State University, just outside Starkville, Mississippi, that opened for the 1975-76 basketball season. Nicknamed The Hump, it is home to the Mississippi State Bulldogs men's and women's basketball teams. The building is the equivalent of seven stories high and is in the shape of an oval 318' long by 268' wide.

The outside is marked by regular concrete columns and Mississippi red brick siding, and the school seal adorns the front of the building. In 2004, a center hung scoreboard was provided by the Henry Mize Foundation. The scoreboard featured four sides, each with a video screen. It was replaced in 2015 by a similar but updated scoreboard that includes two ring displays along with four main video displays. The current court design was announced in 2016, with the court itself installed in 2017. It features many design details highlighting the school's local ties. The playing area is surrounded by lettering that lists all 82 counties in the state, all appearing in gray except for the school's home of Oktibbeha County, which is in white lettering at midcourt between the team benches. Directly above the Oktibbeha County name is a white outline of the state with an "X" marking Starkville's location, which is also the point at which substitutes report to enter the game. Also, the city nickname of "Starkvegas" appears in large all-caps lettering at the baseline in front of the student section.

In February 2022, renovation work began as part of the ongoing project in the university athletic district. The phase one renovations include adding more vendors, restrooms, a premium club level, as well as updating the building infrastructure. Phase one is projected to be completed by Fall 2023.

In addition to basketball, the arena is a popular venue for concerts, graduation ceremonies, and other events.

It was named for George Duke Humphrey, president of Mississippi State from 1934 to 1945. It replaced Mississippi State Gymnasium (later known as McCarthy Gymnasium), which was built in 1950, was subsequently converted to an indoor tennis center, and then demolished in 2023 to make way for the Jim and Thomas Duff Center.

== See also ==
- List of NCAA Division I basketball arenas
