= George Robert Hightower =

American politician

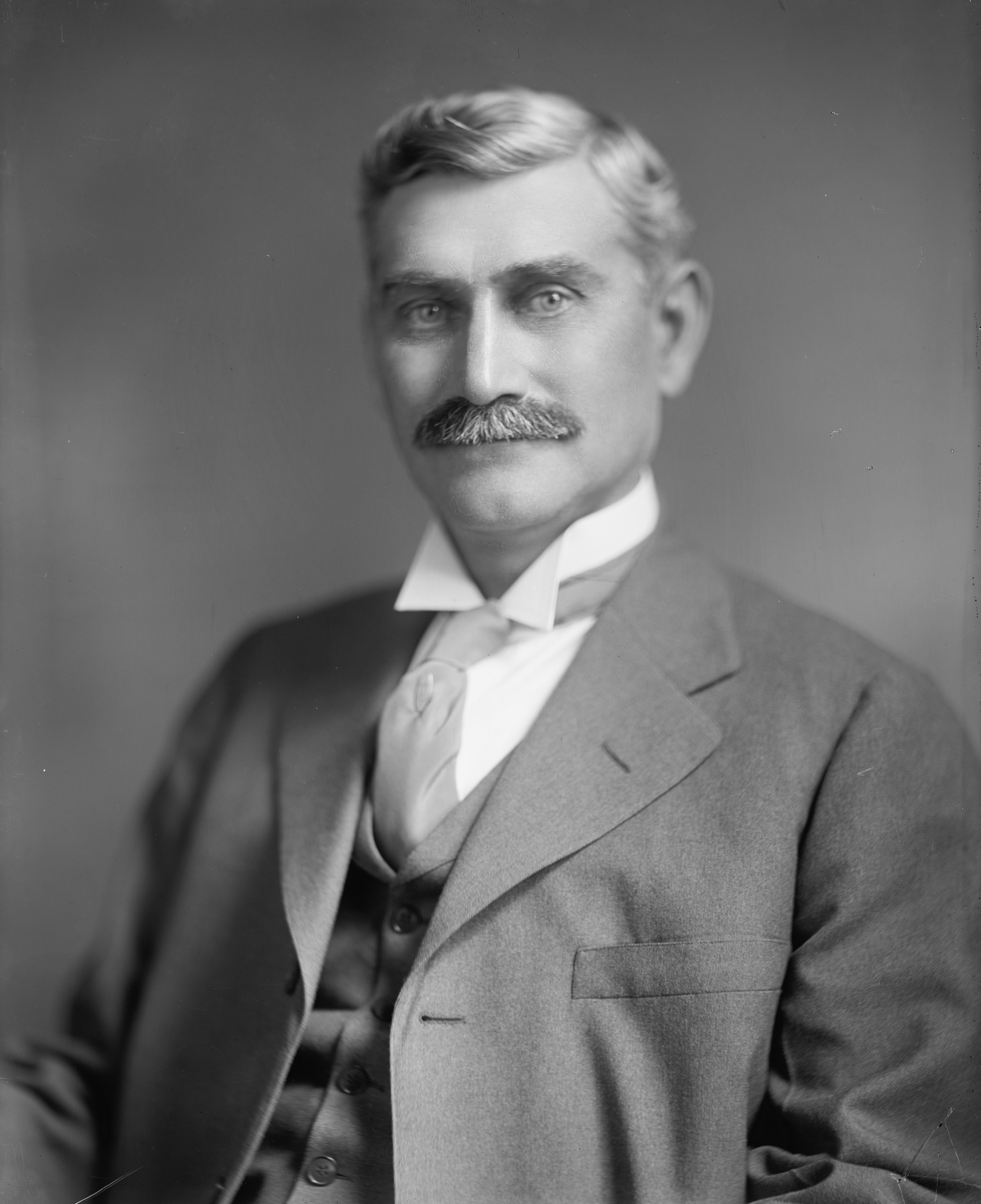
George Robert Hightower

George Robert Hightower (October 15, 1865 – February 19, 1958) was an American state legislator in Mississippi.

He was born at Smith's Mills, in Grenada County, Mississippi, a son of George Hightower, Jr., and Fannie (Kirby) Hightower.

He began his education in the public schools in Grenada County, Mississippi, and later attended Normal College at Buena Vista, Mississippi, for three years, graduating in 1889. He became a teacher, first in Grenada County, then in the Abbeville Normal School in Abbeville, Mississippi, for three years. He next spent a year as instructor in the Grenada Female College at Grenada, Mississippi, and subsequently accepted a teaching position in the public schools of New Albany, Mississippi, where he was later made principal. In 1895 he retired from teaching to engage in farming in Lafayette County, Mississippi; and while residing there he was elected county superintendent of education in 1898 for a four- year term.

He was elected to the state legislature in 1904 and after serving for one term as a member of the Mississippi House of Representatives, he was elected to represent Lafayette County in the Mississippi Senate in 1906, followed by reelection. While Mr. Hightower was a member of the state legislature he was active in having a state department of agriculture created and in securing the passage of a bill reducing the legal rate of interest from ten to eight per cent per annum.

After serving a part of his second term in the legislature, he resigned to become state president of the Farmers Educational and Cooperative Union, a national farmers' organization, which position he occupied until 1912. In 1908 he was appointed a delegate to the International Cotton Conference held in Barcelona, Spain, which he attended in company with Harvey Jordan of Georgia, representative of the National Cotton Association of the United States and James H. Brooks, who represented the United States Department of State.

He became president of the Mississippi Agricultural and Mechanical College at Starkville in 1912, now Mississippi State University, and remained at the head of that institution from until 1916. While serving as its president, he inaugurated a department of markets, which was the first of the kind to be established in any similar institution in the United States. The department of business of the college was also inaugurated during Mr. Hightower's administration as president. He was also instrumental in beautifying the college campus and planting the water oaks and elms.

In January, 1924, he was appointed as state tax commissioner by Governor H. L. Whitfield. Mr. Hightower served under Governor Whitfield's administration and also under Governor Murphree, who became governor of the state upon the death of Governor Whitfield March 18, 1927.

After many years devoted to public service, Mr. Hightower concentrated on the cultivation of more than 3,000 acres (12 km^{2}) of land in Washington, Mississippi, near Natchez. He died February 19, 1958, and is buried in the Natchez City Cemetery. Hightower Hall at Mississippi State was named in his honor but has since been demolished.

Academic offices
Preceded by John Crumpton Hardy	President of Mississippi State University; 1912-1916	Succeeded by William Hall Smith
