= Journal of Early Intervention =

- Discipline: Special education
- Language: English
- Edited by: Laurie Dinnebeil

Publication details
- History: 1981–present
- Publisher: SAGE Publications on behalf of the Division for Early Childhood (Council for Exceptional Children)
- Frequency: Quarterly
- Impact factor: 1.241 (2017)

Standard abbreviations
- ISO 4: J. Early Interv.

Indexing
- ISSN: 1053-8151 (print); 2154-3992 (web)
- LCCN: 92641643
- OCLC no.: 19753071

Links
- Journal homepage; Online access; Online archive

The Journal of Early Intervention is a quarterly peer-reviewed academic journal that covers the field of special education. The journal's editor-in-chief is Laurie Dinnebeil (University of Toledo).

== Abstracting and indexing ==
The journal is abstracted and indexed in Scopus and the Social Sciences Citation Index. According to the Journal Citation Reports, its 2017 impact factor is 1.241, ranking it 18th out of 40 journals in the category "Education, Special",. 39th out of 69 journals in the category "Rehabilitation", and 38th out of 59 journals in the category "Psychology, Educational".
