= Clifford V. Smith Jr. =

American academic administrator (1931–2020)

Clifford Vaughn Smith Jr. (November 29, 1931 – March 13, 2020) was an American academic administrator who was the 4th chancellor of University of Wisconsin–Milwaukee and the first African American four-year college chancellor in the University of Wisconsin System.

Before joining UW-Milwaukee, Smith had been on academic positions with City University of New York, Tufts University, the University of Massachusetts Amherst, the University of Connecticut and Oregon State University. He became the president of GE Foundation after his tenure.

Smith obtained his B.S. from University of Iowa, M.S. and Ph.D. from Johns Hopkins University. He died in Portland, Oregon on March 13, 2020, at the age of 88.

Academic offices
Preceded by Frank E. Horton	Chancellor of the University of Wisconsin–Milwaukee; 1986–1990	Succeeded by John H. Schroeder
