= Judi Patton =

American women's safety and child abuse prevention activist (born 1940)

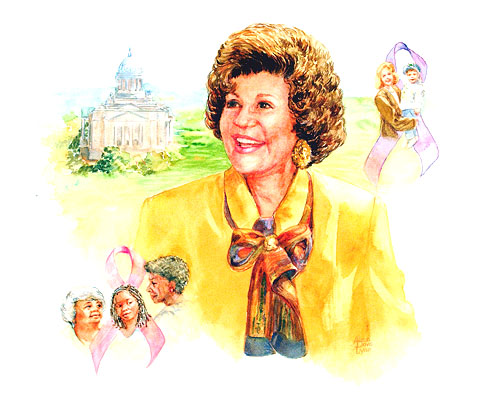

First Lady of Kentucky
- In role December 12, 1995 – December 9, 2003
- Governor: Paul E. Patton
- Preceded by: Libby Jones
- Succeeded by: Glenna Fletcher

Personal details
- Born: Judi Jane Conway; 1940 (age 85–86) Pikeville, Kentucky, U.S.
- Spouse(s): Bill Harvey Johnson (divorced 1973); Paul E. Patton (married 1977)
- Children: Bambi and Jan Harvey Johnson, Jr.; step-children, Nicky and Steve Patton
- Parent(s): Esta and Roy Conway

Judi Jane Conway Patton (born 1940 in Pikeville, Kentucky, US) is an American activist for women's safety and child abuse prevention. She served as the first lady of Kentucky from December 12, 1995, until December 9, 2003, during the tenure of her husband, former Governor Paul E. Patton.

== Early life ==
Judi Conway was born in Pike County, Kentucky as one of four daughters born to Roy and Esta Conway.

Roy Conway was a businessman and former state legislator who had been elected as sheriff "on a platform to clean out bootleggers and stop corruption that spoiled the reputation of our beautiful mountain town". He was assassinated by bootleggers, Tommy and Hubert Vanover, in front of his family home on July 28, 1950, at the age of 44. Esta Conway was originally from the Craft and Wright families of Letcher County, Kentucky and attended Morehead State Teacher's College. She continued her husband's work and was the first female sheriff in the town, but was defeated as she ran for a special election to complete her husband's former term.

After her father's death, the Conway family opened a small grocery store, where the children were expected to work part-time. Mrs. Conway offered credit to women and families in need. While completing college, Mrs. Conway would welcome women and families into their home.

In a 2002 interview, Patton expressed how important these actions were in rescuing women from danger and creating meaningful connections among women in the town: "Many times she would bring women and children home. Mama had this great networking system in Pikeville -- the women she got a job, the kids she put in school. ... Almost until Mama passed away, she was getting letters from women saying they would have been lost if she wasn't there to get them out. So, I thought, if I could do anything to make her proud of me, I would carry on her work." Esta Conway died on April 29, 1991, at the age of 78; she was central in shaping her daughter's activism.

During the Appalachian War on Poverty, Patton was constantly at home with her mother caring for and nurturing the women her mother brought home to their eastern Kentucky home.

== Personal life ==
After graduating from Pikeville College, Judi Conroy married coal operator Bill Harvey Johnson in 1965 and had two children. They divorced in 1973. Two years later Johnson was murdered in a robbery.

In 1977, she married Paul E. Patton who was also from Pike County. They met when she was working as a secretary at Kentucky Elkhorn Coal Mine, which Paul owned. It was a second marriage for both of them.

Patton ran a garden and landscaping business in Pike County, and was active in the Democratic Women's Club, the Pike County Junior Women's Club. She also chaired the Pike County Cancer Society. In 1984 she served as a delegate to the Democratic National Convention.

The Pattons both agreed with the principles and policies of the Democratic Party, which they carried with them through their political careers in Kentucky.

== Activist work ==
In December 1995, Paul Patton became 59th Governor of Kentucky and the Pattons entered the Governor's Office in Frankfort, Kentucky. Immediately, Judi focused on taboo topics such as child abuse and domestic violence.

While in office in Frankfort, Kentucky, she pushed "20 bills that strengthened protections for children, domestic violence and sexual assault survivors, created policy standards for prosecuting perpetrators and expanded training initiatives from local law enforcement to judges, doctors and nurses."

In 1994 the federal Violence Against Women Act passed.

In 1996 Patton received from Janet Reno the federal government's allotted grant funding for the Commonwealth to address the needs of domestic violence and sexual assault victims.

In 1998 Vice President Al Gore presented to Patton a special "full faith and credit" grant of nearly $3 million from the STOP Violence Against Women program from the U.S. Department of Justice. Patton's work led to the creation of 11 advocacy centers in Kentucky's Area Development Districts.

Other leadership roles Patton took on were:

1. Helping create the Governor's Task Force on Sexual Assault, which proposed legislation creating and funding Rape Crisis Centers around the state, removing legal restrictions on marital rape victims, toughening sexual offender laws and creating victim protections.
2. Backing legislation that created Family courts in Kentucky.
3. Promoting legislation that forced insurance companies to cover the cost of breast reconstruction and equalization for cancer patients.
4. Becoming the first governor's wife to serve on the Kentucky Commission on Women.
5. Hosting an annual reception for survivors of breast cancer and helping create the Kentucky Breast Cancer Coalition.
6. Lobbying lawmakers to pass legislation addressing child abuse, rape, domestic violence and child support.

The only bill with which Patton's lobbying did not succeed was the criminalization of sexual assault between spouses.

In 2002, the Kentucky Commission on Women hosted a conference to discuss a report on the Economic Status of Kentucky's Women. Governor Patton had formed a task force in November 2001 after a national survey ranked Kentucky as the third worst state for women. Patton and former Governor Martha Layne Collins served as co-chairs of the task force and produced a report that evidenced Kentucky's failing rankings in health and nutrition, educational attainment, equity in pay and education, economic sufficiency and political and business leadership.

In 2001, Judi's Place for Kids opened in Pikeville - a center named in her honor. Patton is on the Board of Directors of the Big Sandy Area Child Advocacy Center, founded in 1999 to serve the five easternmost counties of Kentucky (Pike, Floyd, Johnson, Magoffin, Martin), in supporting and protecting child abuse survivors.

In 2003, The Judi Conway Patton Endowed Chair of Study on Violence Against Women was established at the University of Kentucky Center for Research on Violence Against Women.

The Judi Patton Center for Families opened in 2021 as a center to provide resources and treatment to women dealing with substance use disorder.

Patton's work concerning women and children continues.

== Awards and honors ==
Patton received over twenty awards between 1996 and 2001 for her work.

- 1996, awarded by the National Center for Missing and Exploited Children.
- 1996: Outstanding Legislative Advocacy award; the Kentucky Coalition against Rape and Sexual Assault.
- 1996: Kentucky Distinguished Citizen Award; the Kentucky Psychological Association
- 1996, received her second national recognition at the 11th National Conference on Child Abuse and Neglect where she received a Commissioner's Award from the U.S. Department of Health and Human Services.
- 1996: Inaugural Committed to Peace in Kentucky Homes Award; Kentucky Domestic Violence Association.
- 1997: Outstanding Leadership award; the Commonwealth's Attorneys' Association.
- 1997: Inaugural Outstanding Advocate Award; Kentucky Council on Child Abuse.
- 1997: she was honored by the Lexington YWCA with the Smith-Breckinridge Award for outstanding leadership in support of women and children.
- 1997: Distinguished Alumna Award; Pikeville High School.
- 1998: she was honored by Board of Directors of Very Special Arts Kentucky for support of Arts Opportunities for Persons with Disabilities.
- 1998: Outstanding Service to Children; Kentucky Council for Exceptional Children, Chapter 5.
- 1998: Junior Williamson Memorial Award; Pike County Chamber of Commerce
- 1999: Friend of Kentucky's Children Award; Exploited Children's Help Organization.
- 1999: Honorary degree of Doctor of Humane Letters (L.H.D.); board of directors of Pikeville College.
- 1999: Children First honored her with a special award for her outstanding leadership in advocating for children.
- 2000: Joy of Life Award; the Kentucky Cancer Program, the Brown Cancer Center
- 2000: Leadership Award; Susan G. Komen Breast Cancer Foundation and BMW Ultimate Drive for the Cure.
- 2000: Outstanding Child Advocate Award; Sunshine Center in Frankfort, Kentucky, where a children's playroom was also dedicated in her honor.
- 2000: Gold Medal Award; Family Place in Louisville for her work on behalf of abused children.
- 2000: Annual Leadership Award; Center for Women and Families in Louisville.
- 2000: she again was honored by the Kentucky Commonwealth's Attorney's Association in recognition of the successful legislative package she championed before the 2000 Session of the Kentucky General Assembly.
- 2001: the Barren River Area Child Advocacy Center honored her for her efforts on behalf of Kentucky's children by establishing the Judi C. Patton Community Conference Hall in the newly constructed advocacy center.
- 2001: she was presented the Key to the city by the Mayor Sandy Jones of Bowling Green who was joined by Warren County Judge Executive Mike Buchanon who presented a joint proclamation declaring January 12, 2001, as Children's Advocacy Day in honor of the First Lady.
- 2010: Woman of Distinction at the Celebration of Service and Survival based Center for Women and Families
- 2023: Flame of Excellence Award; Leadership Kentucky
