= Malcolm Portera =

Malcolm Portera (born January 31, 1946) is the former Chancellor of The University of Alabama System. Prior to that he served as President of Mississippi State University from 1998 to 2001. He has also served as the interim president of the University of Alabama in Huntsville and the University of Alabama at Birmingham.

In January 2012 Portera announced his retirement, pending the installation of his successor.

Academic offices
Preceded by Donald W. Zacharias	President of Mississippi State University; 1998-2001	Succeeded by J. Charles Lee
