= John Crumpton Hardy =

President of the Mississippi Agricultural and Mechanical College (1900 - 1912)

John Crumpton Hardy (December 24, 1864 – October 30, 1938) was the President of the Mississippi Agricultural and Mechanical College (now Mississippi State University) from 1900 - 1912.

== Biography ==
John Crumpton Hardy was born in Newton, Mississippi on December 24, 1864 to John D. and Martha Hardy. He attended Mississippi College where he earned a BA and an MA and earned a law degree at Millsaps College.

Before becoming president of Mississippi A&M College Hardy served as superintendent of the Jackson, Mississippi, schools for nine years. In 1912 he became president of Baylor Female College (now the University of Mary Hardin-Baylor) in Belton, Texas.

Academic offices
Preceded by John M. Stone	President of Mississippi State University; 1900–1912	Succeeded by George Robert Hightower
