= David Carlisle Hull =

David Carlisle Hull (November 20, 1869 – April 3, 1928) was the President of the Mississippi Agricultural and Mechanical College (now Mississippi State University) from 1920 to 1925, and president of Kentucky Wesleyan College from 1925 until his death in 1928.

== Personal life ==
Hull was the father of Roger Hull, president of the Mutual Life Insurance Company of New York.

== Legacy ==
Hull Hall at Mississippi State is named in his honor.

Academic offices
| Preceded by William Hall Smith | President of Mississippi State University; 1920-1925 | Succeeded by Buz M. Walker |
