= Laurie Dinnebeil =

American scholar of childhood education

- Born: Toledo, Ohio, U.S.
- Education: Dominican College (B.A.); Augustana College (MAT); Utah State University (Ph.D.)
- Occupations: Scholar; professor
- Years active: 1994–present

Laurie Dinnebeil is an American scholar of childhood education. She is the Daso Herb Endowed Chair at the University of Toledo. She was editor-in-chief of the Journal of Early Intervention for a period of five years, beginning in 2014.
