= Donald W. Zacharias =

American university administrator

Donald W. Zacharias (September 28, 1935 – March 3, 2013) was the 15th President of Mississippi State University from 1985 to 1997. Previously he served as the 6th president of Western Kentucky University from 1979 until 1985.

== Mississippi State University ==
Zacharias' 12 years leading the university is the second-longest tenure at Mississippi's flagship land-grant institution's 130-year history, ranking only behind Stephen D. Lee's 19-year stint as the first president of the university. Zacharias retired following the Fall 1997 semester at the age of 62 due to his being diagnosed with multiple sclerosis. During his tenure enrollment rose to Mississippi's highest at almost 16,000. African-American enrollment more than doubled to 2,200, making up 15 percent of the student body, the highest percentage among SEC schools. Upon his retirement from Mississippi State University, Zacharias said: "I saw things in Mississippi State University that others might not have seen. I felt that I had made the right decision to be at this university because I liked both what it stood for and its overall character. I liked its mission, and I liked the students and alumni. I saw the potential." The Donald Zacharias Graduate Teaching Assistant of the Year Award is named for him and The annual Donald W. Zacharias Distinguished Staff Awards, given to professional or support staff employees at Mississippi State, were established in his honor in 2013. The Zacharias Housing Village, made up of 4 residence halls, was named in his honor in 2008.

== Western Kentucky University ==
Zacharias became president at Western Kentucky University following the retirement of Dero Downing in 1979. Zacharias Hall, a three-story residence hall built in 1992 on the Western Kentucky University campus that houses 206 upperclassmen and women, is named after Dr. Zacharias.

== Early career ==
Zacharias began his career in higher education in 1963 at Indiana University where he was a faculty member in communication until 1969. He then went to work in the University of Texas communication department, attaining full professor rank before entering administration. As an administrator with the University of Texas System, he held positions as executive assistant to the chancellor of the 14-campus statewide system and as assistant to the president of the Austin campus.

== Education ==
Zacharias received a bachelor's degree from Georgetown College in Kentucky in 1957, where he was a member of the Lambda Chi Alpha fraternity. He received a master's degree in 1959 and a doctorate in communication in 1963 from Indiana University Bloomington. He held an honorary Doctorate of Law from Georgetown for distinguished contributions to the college. He once auditioned for the position of play-by-play announcer at Indiana while he was a graduate student but lost out to a gentleman named Dick Enberg who went on to a Hall of Fame broadcasting career. Zacharias reported that he had a sore throat the day of the auditions.

== Personal life and death ==
Zacharias was born in Salem, Indiana. He and his wife, Tommie Kline Zacharias, were married 53 years. They had three children Eric, Leslie and Alan; and three grandchildren. He also had a sister, Mary Catherine Zacharias Collier, of Yucaipa, California.

Zacharias died of complications of multiple sclerosis on March 3, 2013, at 77 years of age.

== See also ==
- List of presidents of Mississippi State University

Academic offices
| Preceded by James Douglas McComas | President of Mississippi State University; 1985–1997 | Succeeded by Malcolm Portera |
