= Frank E. Horton =

American educator and administrator (born 1939)

3rd Chancellor of the University of Wisconsin–Milwaukee
- In office 1980–1985
- Preceded by: Werner A. Baum
- Succeeded by: Clifford V. Smith Jr.

11th President of the University of Oklahoma
- In office 1985–1988
- Preceded by: William S. Banowsky
- Succeeded by: Richard L. Van Horn

13th President of the University of Toledo
- In office 1989–1998
- Preceded by: James Douglas McComas
- Succeeded by: Vik J. Kapoor

Personal details
- Born: August 19, 1939 (age 87)
- Education: Northwestern University
- Profession: Geographer

Frank Elba Horton (born August 19, 1939) is an American educator and administrator. He had been the chancellor or president of University of Wisconsin–Milwaukee (1980–1985), University of Oklahoma (1985–1988) and the University of Toledo (1989–1998).

== Biography ==
Horton received his Ph.D. in geography from Northwestern University in 1968. He had been a professor of geography, the director of the Institute of Urban and Regional Research at the University of Iowa and the chair of the Urban Affairs Division of the National Association of State Universities and Land Grant Colleges. He became the third chancellor of UW-Milwaukee in 1980 and the 11th president of University of Oklahoma in 1985. After leaving OU, he joined University of Toledo as its 13th president. After leaving the University of Toledo he and his wife Nancy settled down in Colorado. Now he enjoys visits from his grandkids After his retirement from University of Toledo, he also served as the interim president of Southern Illinois University.

The Horton International House at the University of Toledo was named after him.

Preceded by William S. Banowsky	President of the University of Oklahoma; 1985-1988	Succeeded by Richard L. Van Horn
