= William Edward Lavery =

12th President of Virginia Polytechnic Institute and State University
- In office 1975–1987
- Preceded by: T. Marshall Hahn
- Succeeded by: James Douglas McComas

Personal details
- Born: November 20, 1930 Geneseo, New York, U.S.
- Died: February 16, 2009 (aged 78) Blacksburg, Virginia, U.S.

William Edward Lavery (November 20, 1930 – February 16, 2009) was the 12th President of Virginia Tech. He served from January 1, 1975 to December 31, 1987.

== Biography ==
Born in Geneseo, New York, he earned his bachelor's degree from Michigan State University, his master’s in public administration from George Washington University, and his doctorate in extension administration from the University of Wisconsin. He began his professional career as a teacher and coach at Clarence Central High School in Clarence, New York, before serving two years in the Army. He began working for the federal Extension Service’s Division of Management Operations in 1956, where he remained until 1966 when he joined the Virginia Cooperative Extension Service as director of administration. He later served as vice president for finance from 1968 to 1973 and executive vice president from 1973 to 1975.

During his tenure as president, Lavery emphasized research, and expenditures in support of research totaled more than $70.2 million by fiscal year 1987, moving the university into the top 50 research institutions in the nation. He enhanced research opportunities by initiating the Corporate Research Center (CRC) and Virginia Tech Intellectual Properties (VTIP). During his 12-year term, the first two buildings were begun at the center and two more were planned. The CRC received an antenna to link Virginia Tech to the world via satellite, and the Extension division developed a series of 26 downlink sites throughout the state. Installation began on a new communication system for the campus, the university purchased a supercomputer, and the first proposal was developed for what later became the Blacksburg Electronic Village. Lavery placed a high priority on alleviating shortages of classroom, laboratory, and office space, and during his term the total inventory of available space increased by 50.1 percent. A $108 million construction program during his presidency included additions to Newman Library and the War Memorial Gymnasium and construction of Litton Reaves Hall, Johnston Student Center and a new dormitory to house 333 students with an attached dining facility, Cochrane Hall. Another $17.5 million funded a complex to house the Virginia-Maryland Regional College of Veterinary Medicine, which was established during his presidency and opened to students in 1980.

Lavery hired the university’s first vice president for development, Charles Forbes, who launched a campaign to raise $50 million — then raised more than $118 million. Large contributions during his presidency included gifts from John Lee Pratt of $11 million to support engineering and agricultural programs and Marion Bradley Via of $3 million to establish the Harvey W. Peters Research Center and $5 million each to support the departments of civil engineering and electrical engineering. Robert B. Pamplin Sr. and Robert Pamplin Jr. gave $10 million to support the College of Business. Assets of the Virginia Tech Foundation grew from $6.2 million to $140.1 million during his term. Lavery joined the faculty at Virginia Tech in 1966 as director of administration for the Extension division before being tapped as vice president for finance in 1968. In 1973, he became executive vice president, and he was appointed president in 1974, effective January 1, 1975.

During his presidency, he received numerous honors and awards. Among them, the National Conference of Christians and Jews presented him with the Brotherhood Award, the governor of Virginia appointed him to serve on the Commission on Virginia’s Transportation in the 21st Century, United States President Ronald Reagan named him chair of the Board for International Food and Agricultural Development (BIFAD) where he served for three years and was later succeeded by Wales H. Madden Jr. The U.S. Secretary of the Treasury also appointed him to the National Savings Bond Committee, where he chaired the Higher Education Industry Campaign.

Desperate for additional farmland for the support of teaching, research, and extension programs in the College of Agriculture and Life Sciences, Virginia Tech acquired Kentland Farm on December 31, 1986. Virginia Tech secretly traded about 250 acres of research orchards adjacent to a commercial area that would soon become Christiansburg's main shopping district to a group of developers for the historic 1,785-acre Kentland property. The developers on the other end of the swap, one of whom was a former Tech athletics official, quickly sold 40 acres of the former university farmland for $2.7 million. News of the land swap, and especially the fact that it was done behind closed doors, sparked outrage.

Lavery developed a reorganization plan for the troubled Athletic Department that had been rocked by a scandal involving alleged recruiting violations, mismanagement of funds and the bitter departure of two athletic directors in less than a year that resulted in a rebuke from Governor of Virginia, Gerald Baliles. Frank Beamer was hired to replace Bill Dooley as head football coach, but with negative publicity continuing to swirl within and around the university, he announced his resignation on October 16, 1987, effective December 31, 1987, to prevent polarization of the campus.

After stepping down as president on December 31, 1987, Lavery continued to serve the university, first as honorary chancellor, then as the William B. Preston Professor of International Affairs. After his retirement on Aug. 1, 1991, he was named president emeritus. The university recognized his contributions by presenting him with the Ruffner Medal in 1993 and in 1995 he was named an honorary alumnus of Virginia Tech. Additionally, the Class of 1997 named its class ring in his honor.

== Family ==
Lavery married the former Peggy Johnson of Pawnee City, Nebraska in 1956; the couple had four children.

== Legacy and Honors ==
Two buildings at Virginia Tech are named in Lavery's honor, the William E. Lavery Animal Health Research Center at the Virginia-Maryland Regional College of Veterinary Medicine in 1995, and Lavery Hall, the Academic and Student Affairs Building, in 2012.
