= James Campbell (philosopher) =

American philosopher

- Education: State University of New York; Stony Brook University
- Occupation: Philosopher

James Campbell is an American philosopher. He was a distinguished university professor in the department of philosophy and religious studies at the University of Toledo.
