= Blacksburg Electronic Village =

The Blacksburg Electronic Village (BEV) was conceived as a project of Virginia Tech in 1991 and officially born in 1993. The goal of the project was to develop an online community linking the entire town. Extensive outside research had been done by sociologists and computer scientists on this project. Some believe that this is one of the most important assets that Blacksburg has besides Virginia Tech itself.

In 1995, around 30,000 out of the 70,000 residents had access to the Internet. Two-thirds of users used the university's web servers. That means that approximately 42.86% of the town's population was on the World Wide Web. The BEV was so thoroughly integrated in the Blacksburg community, that in 1998, the town was chosen by Guinness World Records as the "Most Wired Community."
