= Kentucky Council on Postsecondary Education =

Coordinates: 38°11′01.5″N 84°48′52.6″W

The Kentucky Council on Postsecondary Education coordinates change and improvement in Kentucky's postsecondary education system as directed by the Kentucky Postsecondary Education Improvement Act of 1997. The Council is a statewide coordinating agency with 16 members: 14 citizens, one faculty member and one student appointed by the Governor; the Commissioner of Education is an ex officio member.

== Responsibilities ==
The Council is charged with leading reform efforts envisioned by state policy leaders in HB1. Among its responsibilities, the Council:

- Serves as the Commonwealth's chief postsecondary education advocate and policy advisor to the Governor and General Assembly.
- Builds consensus around higher education policy proposals and mediates discussions among public and independent colleges and universities, the General Assembly and other key constituents.
- Represents the public's interest through the development and implementation of a strategic agenda that includes measures of educational attainment, effectiveness and efficiency for postsecondary and adult education.
- Produces and submits a biennial budget request and performance funding model for adequate public funding on behalf of public postsecondary and adult education.
- Monitors and approves tuition rates and admission criteria at public institutions.
- Approves academic programs at public institutions.
- Connects eligibility for new academic programs to campus performance in meeting diversity objectives.
- Licenses non-public postsecondary institutions.
- Administers Kentucky's adult education system and GED testing centers.
- Collects, analyzes and reports comprehensive data on postsecondary education performance.
- Ensures the coordination and connectivity of technology among public postsecondary institutions.
- Administers the Kentucky Virtual Campus, Kentucky Virtual Library and Kentucky Regional Optical Network to provide online resources and services to K-12 universities, state agencies and other organizations.
- Procures and manages federal, foundation and state grants to advance legislative mandates and student success initiatives.
- Implements a statewide diversity policy that is aligned with the strategic agenda.
- Develops and implements an orientation and continuing education program for college and university board members or regents.
- Works with campuses to improve the transferability of credits among public two-year and four-year institutions to eliminate unnecessary duplication of credits and shorten time-to-degree.
- Collaborating with the Kentucky Department of Education to implement the "Unified Strategy for College and Career Readiness to reduce college remediation rates.

== History ==
The Council was originally established in 1934 as the Council on Public Higher Education, and was renamed the Council on Higher Education in 1977. Twenty years later, the Kentucky General Assembly passed higher education reforms in the Commonwealth with the passage of the Postsecondary Education Improvement Act of 1997, commonly referred to as House Bill 1 (HB1). House Bill 1 created the Council on Postsecondary Education to provide direction and oversight to all Kentucky postsecondary institutions.

=== Kentucky Virtual Library (KYVL) ===
To further support lifelong learning in the Commonwealth, HB1 also created the Kentucky Virtual Library (KYVL). KYVL serves all Kentuckians by providing free access to multiple learning and research tools to anyone with a library card. KYVL provides users with the ability to search a number of databases of books and scholarly works, while also providing help on research methods and techniques. KYVL serves public and private postsecondary institutions, public and private K-12 schools, public libraries and special research institutions.

=== GEAR UP Kentucky ===
GEAR UP (Gaining Early Awareness and Readiness for Undergraduate Programs) Kentucky is a competitive federal grant program designed to increase the college-going rate. In 2018, the Council was awarded a seven-year, $24.5 million grant to serve at least 10,000 middle and high school students in at least 10 school districts. This was the fourth GEAR UP state grant for Kentucky that has been administered through the Council.

== See also ==
- Education in Kentucky
