= Billy Mitts =

Former Mississippi state senator

F. W. "Billy" Mitts

Member of the Mississippi Senate from the 40th district
- In office 1960–1964

Personal details
- Born: 1919 Clarke County, Mississippi, U.S.
- Died: April 1, 1973 (aged 54) Meridian, Mississippi, U.S.
- Resting place: Enterprise Cemetery; Enterprise, Mississippi
- Party: Democratic Party
- Spouse: Lugennia Mitts
- Parent: F. W. "Buddy" Mitts (father)
- Education: Mississippi State University

Fielden William "Billy" Mitts (1919–1973) was an American attorney and Democratic Party politician from Mississippi. He served in the Mississippi State Senate from 1960 to 1964.

== Biography ==
Mitts was born to F. W. "Buddy" Mitts and his wife, and grew up in Clarke County, Mississippi. He attended Gulf Coast Military Academy and Mississippi State University, where he was a cheerleader and the student body president. He graduated from Mississippi State in 1942.

In 1959, he was elected as the state senator for Clarke and Jasper counties. He ran for re-election in 1963, when the 40th district had been redrawn to include Wayne County in place of Jasper County. He lost in the first round of primary elections to W. Vol "Bill" Jones.

Mitts was opposed to racial integration of schools in Mississippi. He is known for his role in trying to prevent the 1962–63 Mississippi State Bulldogs men's basketball team from playing in the NCAA tournament against the Loyola Ramblers, a team from Chicago which featured four black starting players. Mitts and another state senator, B. W. Lawson, obtained a temporary injunction to restrain the team within the state ahead of gameday. However, this injunction was never served before the team's plane departed for the game, and it was later dissolved for lacking legal basis. The game between the Bulldogs and the Ramblers thus went on as planned, and is now known as the Game of Change.

Mitts died on April 1, 1973, in Meridian Hospital. His funeral was held on April 3, and he was buried in Enterprise Cemetery in Enterprise, Mississippi.

== Personal life ==
He married Lugennia White from Macon, Georgia. He had one son and three daughters, including Chandler Mitts, who ran for the Mississippi House of Representatives twice in the 1990s.

== See also ==
- Russell Fox (politician), a state representative who also opposed NCAA tournament participation
- Walter Hester, a state representative who also opposed NCAA tournament participation
