= Dean W. Colvard =

President of Mississippi State University

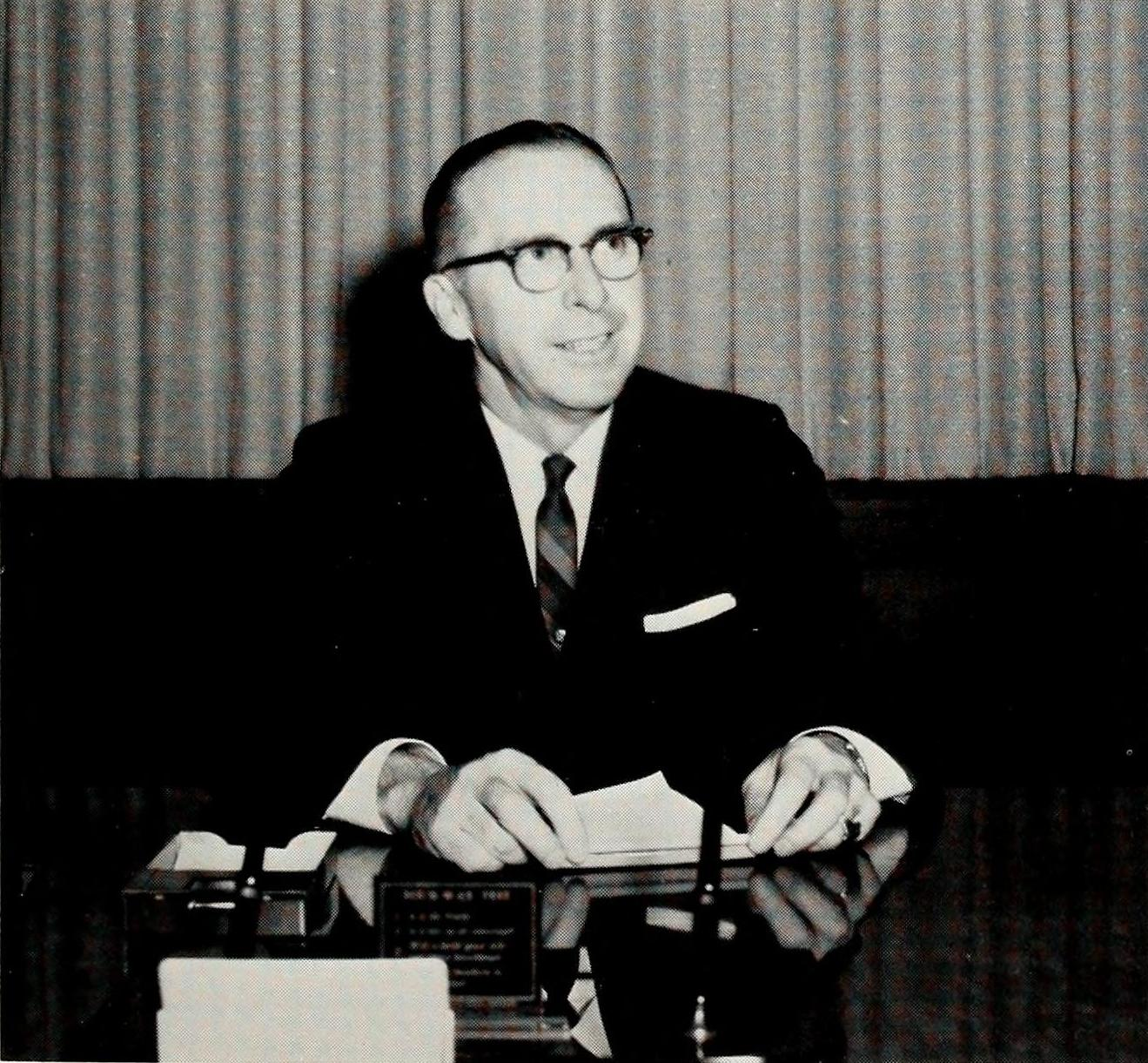
- Colvard at Mississippi State in 1963

12th President of Mississippi State University
- In office 1960–1966
- Governor: Ross Barnett; Paul B. Johnson Jr.
- Preceded by: Benjamin F. Hilbun
- Succeeded by: William L. Giles

1st Chancellor of the University of North Carolina at Charlotte
- In office April 1966 – December 1978
- Appointed by: William Friday
- Succeeded by: E.K. Fretwell

Personal details
- Born: Dean Wallace Colvard; July 10, 1913 Grassy Creek, Ashe County, North Carolina, U.S.
- Died: June 28, 2007 (aged 93)
- Education: Berea College (B.A.); University of Missouri (M.A.); Purdue University (Ph.D.)
- Occupation: Academic administrator

Dean Wallace Colvard (July 10, 1913 – June 28, 2007) was a president of Mississippi State University, notable for his role in a 1963 controversy surrounding the participation of the university's basketball team in the NCAA tournament.

== Early life and education ==
Colvard was born in Grassy Creek, Ashe County, North Carolina on July 10, 1913. Colvard received his Bachelor of Arts degree from Berea College, and followed that up by getting his Master of Arts from the University of Missouri. He then went to Purdue University and received his Ph.D. in science and mathematics. Colvard attended college for a total of 19 years, from 1931 until 1950.

== Career ==
=== Mississippi State University ===
After serving as the Dean of Agriculture at North Carolina State University, Colvard became president of Mississippi State University. He arrived in 1960, when Mississippi had an "unwritten law" against integrated collegiate athletics. This meant that no team from Mississippi could accept an invitation to play against any team that had African Americans on it. The rule came into effect after 1955, when Jones County Junior College accepted the invitation to the Junior Rose Bowl against a team of mixed race from Compton, California.

During the eight-year existence of the "unwritten law", no team confronted it more than the MSU Maroons basketball team. The Maroons (now known as Bulldogs) won three SEC titles between 1959 and 1962, and by winning the title they were granted an invitation to the integrated NCAA Tournament. MSU turned down each offer because of the "unwritten law", and was not able to participate in postseason play because of this.

Babe McCarthy, the head basketball coach at MSU, expressed frustration at having his team excluded from the postseason tournament each year. McCarthy pleaded on his talk show to have his players allowed to play in postseason play during the 1963 season.

"It makes me sick to the heart to think that these players, who just clinched no worse than a tie for their third straight SEC championship, will have to put away their uniforms and not compete in the NCAA tournament… This is all I can say, but I think everyone knows how I feel," McCarthy said.

Colvard promised to take a look at the situation, but was later quoted as saying he "just was glad to have avoided a confrontation." Students still had no idea where Colvard stood on the issue. The Maroons did not compete in the post season that year. Colvard later claimed that the reason was because "he did not feel well-enough established to make a decision of such sort."

In 1963, alumni and fans combined to show their support for the team in their battle against the "unwritten law". The Reflector, Mississippi State's student newspaper, got involved and challenged Colvard's authority.

"Should a dynamic university be led by a man with the intelligence to make a decision on the merits of the case and the guts to back it up?" The Reflector editors wrote. "Or, should it be led by a man, who out of fear for his job, would listen to and be persuaded by politicians who are usually trying to create votes?"

An established alumnus took a shot at Colvard, saying, "Are you...under so much of a threat of coercion and intimidation by those for powerful demagogues that you have no choice in the matter?"

Bowing to pressure to take a stand, Colvard presented the issue as an administrative affair rather than as an educational matter. He told the chairman of the College Board that he was going to allow the Maroons to play in the NCAA championships.

"It had begun to look as if our first major racial issue might pertain to basketball rather than to admissions. Although I knew opinion would be divided and feelings would be intense because of the unwritten law...I thought I had gained sufficient following that, win or lose, I should take decisive action," Colvard later said.

On March 2, 1963, Colvard announced publicly the acceptance of the invitation to the NCAA tournament. He did this fifteen minutes before the team's final game of the season, against rival Ole Miss.

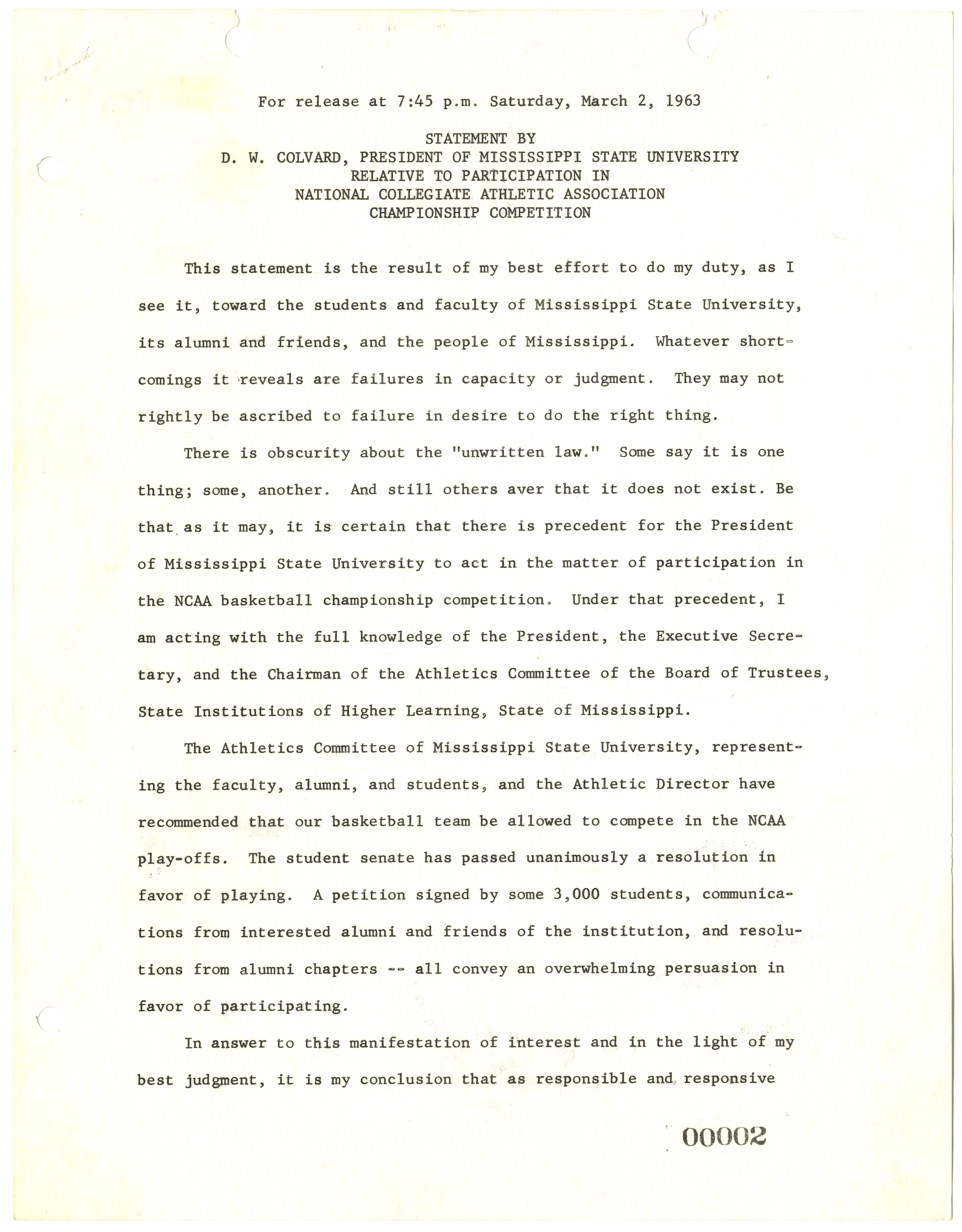
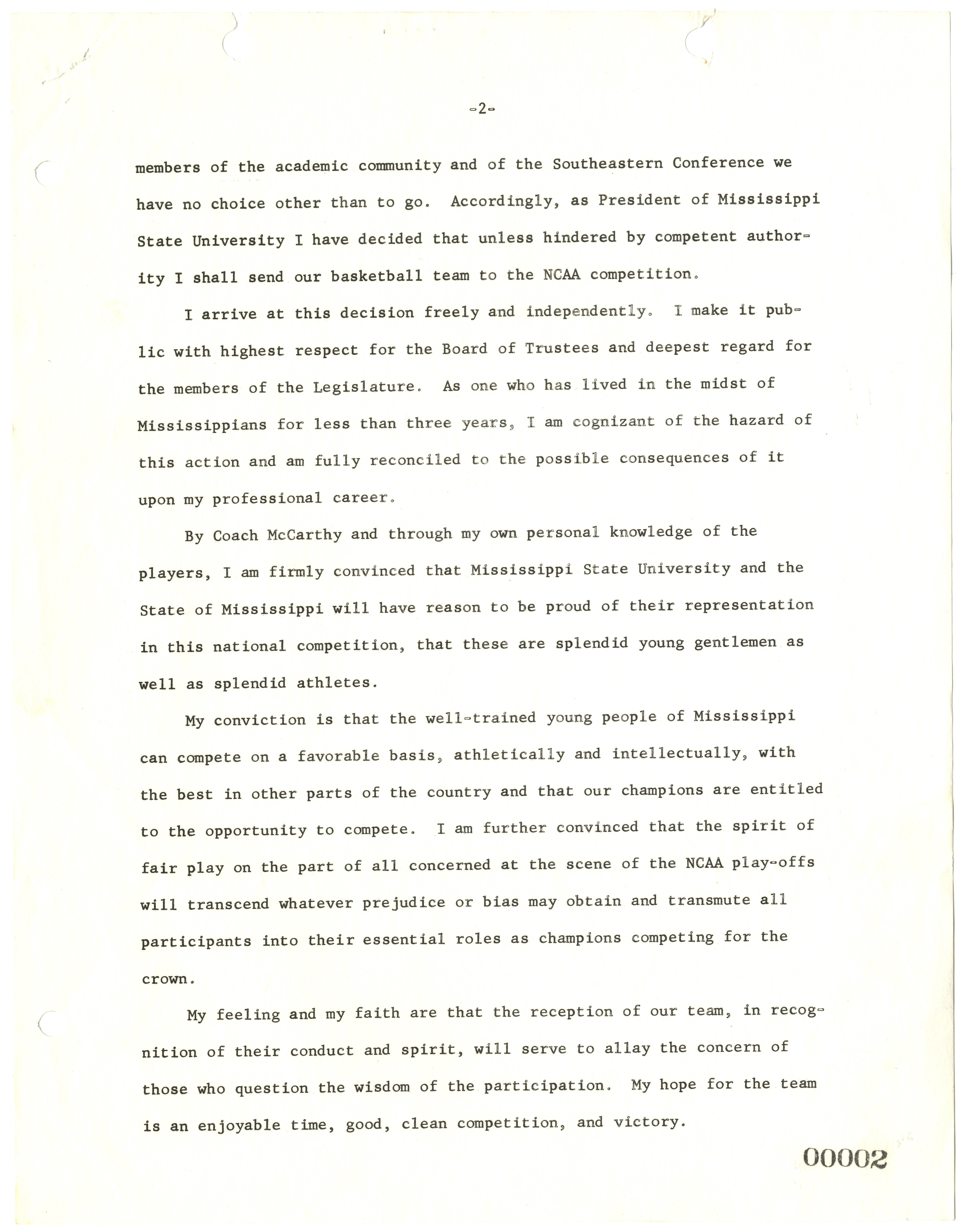
Colvard's public statement announcing his intent to send the Bulldogs to the tournament

Colvard claimed in a statement, "In answer to a manifestation of interest and in light of my best judgment, it is my conclusion that as responsible members of the academic community and of the SEC we have no choice other than to go. Accordingly, as president of MSU I have decided that unless hindered by competent authority I shall send our basketball team to the NCAA competition."

Controversy grew between Colvard and local politicians. Although Governor Ross Barnett never issued a public statement, columnist Charles M. Hills has stated his opinion that Barnett privately "deplored" Colvard's act. Meanwhile, Senator Billy Mitts accused Colvard of striking a "low blow to the people of Mississippi" and advocated "a substantial decrease in the financial appropriation for every university of this great state that encourages integration." He also added that only native sons should be trusted to occupy the chief executive officerships of Mississippi colleges so as never again to risk "a similar tragedy of this sort." Mitts did not stop there. He introduced a resolution in the state senate to prevent winning teams from accepting invitations to post-season games involving integrated teams (it was referred to a committee from which it never emerged). Most striking of all, shortly afterward the Mississippi Board of Trustees of Institutions of Higher Learning, by an 8–3 vote, upheld Colvard's decision, but, just hours before the team was to leave for the tournament, Mitts teamed with a local judge to acquire an injunction to be served on Colvard or Coach McCarthy prohibiting the team from participating in the tournament. Colvard, McCarthy, and the university athletic and assistant athletic director then slipped out of Starkville to prevent the injunction from having effect. The next morning, the basketball players and an assistant coach – not named in the injunction – flew to Nashville to pick up three of those who left to avoid the injunction, including Coach McCarthy, and then toward the game site where the injunction was dissolved by the Mississippi Supreme Court shortly before the first game tipoff.

Although Colvard was considered a hero within the university, outside of it, he was harshly criticized. Editors of local papers spoke out about the decision, claiming that the decision should not have been made, for fear of jeopardizing the southern way of life. Perhaps the harshest statement was made by a student of the university, who said, "... Bobby Kennedy may award you a medal of honor for the betrayal of State University and the people of Mississippi."

In their first post-season appearance following Colvard's decision, MSU played against the Loyola Ramblers, which had four African-American players. This game was ultimately known as the Game of Change.

In a 2003 interview with The Charlotte Observer, Colvard said of segregation controversy: "I was going to send those boys to that tournament. If anybody was going to get in the way, well, I'd be the winner of that."

=== University of North Carolina at Charlotte ===
After Colvard's tenure at MSU, he became the first full-time Chancellor at the newly minted University of North Carolina at Charlotte. He was selected by UNC System president William Friday and took office in April 1966. He held that position until his eventual retirement in 1978. Colvard was active in increasing the reputation of the university's science and mathematics program, where he was also on the board of trustees. During his tenure, he oversaw the development of the University Research Park and the Discovery Place science museum in Uptown Charlotte.

== Death ==
Colvard continued to donate to UNC Charlotte and attended campus events until his death. Colvard died at the age of 93 on June 28, 2007.

== Honors ==
The Colvard Student Union at Mississippi State is named in his honor.

The D. W. Colvard Scholarship for Merit, available to entering freshmen attending the University of North Carolina at Charlotte, is named in his honor.

The Colvard Building on UNC Charlotte's main campus is named after him.

Academic offices
Preceded by Benjamin F. Hilbun	President of Mississippi State University; 1960–1966	Succeeded by William L. Giles
Preceded by Bonnie Cone (as president of Charlotte College)	Chancellor of University of North Carolina at Charlotte; 1966–1978	Succeeded by E.K. Fretwell
