= Benjamin F. Hilbun =

Benjamin Franklin Hilbun (November 14, 1890 – December 13, 1963) was the President of the Mississippi State College during its name change to Mississippi State University from 1953–1960. Dr. Hilbun was a long time employee of Mississippi State having served on the faculty at MSU from 1925 until his retirement as President in 1960.

Hilbun supported the legal degradation of African-American citizens. As president of the university, Hilbun did not permit its athletic teams to play against teams with African-American players or participate in post-season tournaments that welcomed African-American players. While Mississippi State's basketball team qualified for the 1959 NCAA basketball tournament, Hilbun forbade the team from entering. Mississippi State University honored Hilbun by naming the Departments of Geosciences and Physics & Astronomy building Hilbun Hall.

Academic offices
Preceded by Fred Tom Mitchell	President of Mississippi State University; 1953–1960	Succeeded by Dean W. Colvard
