= Fred Tom Mitchell =

American academic (1891–1953)

Fred Tom Mitchell (July 4, 1891 – December 5, 1953) was the President of the Mississippi State College (now Mississippi State University) from 1945 to 1953. He was an alumnus of Mississippi State University. He received a master's degree from Peabody College (now part of Vanderbilt University) and a PhD from Penn State University

== Honors ==
The Mitchell Memorial Library at Mississippi State is named in his honor.

Academic offices
Preceded by George Duke Humphrey	President of Mississippi State University; 1945-1953	Succeeded by Benjamin F. Hilbun
