= 1963 NCAA University Division basketball championship game =

1963 NCAA tournament championship game
National championship game
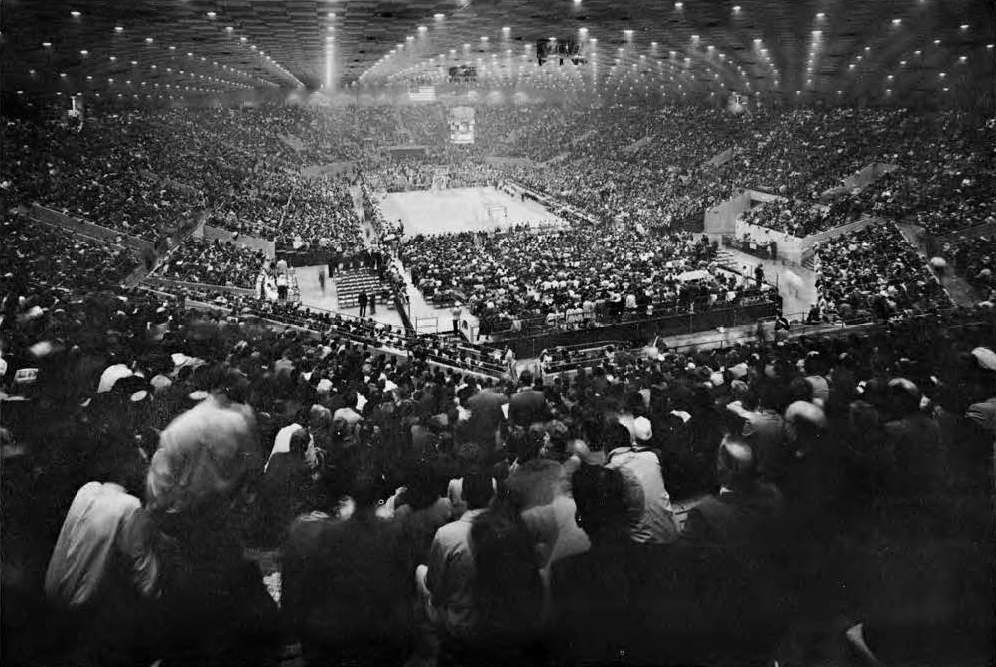
- Freedom Hall circa 1963
Loyola Ramblers	Cincinnati Bearcats
Independent	MVC
(28–2)	(26–1)
60	58
Head coach: George Ireland	Head coach: Ed Jucker
- AP: 3
- Coaches: 4
- AP: 1
- Coaches: 1
	1st half	2nd half	OT	Total
Loyola Ramblers	21	33	6	60
Cincinnati Bearcats	29	25	4	58
- Date: March 23, 1963
- Venue: Freedom Hall, Louisville, Kentucky
- Referees: Bill Bussenius and Alex George
- Attendance: 19,153

United States TV coverage
- Network: Sports Network Incorporated

The 1963 NCAA University Division basketball championship game was the final of the 1963 NCAA University Division basketball tournament and determined the national champion in the 1962–63 NCAA University Division men's basketball season. The game was held on March 23, 1963, at Freedom Hall in Louisville, Kentucky. The matchup pitted the Loyola-Chicago Ramblers, who were making their first NCAA tournament appearance, against the Cincinnati Bearcats, the two-time defending national champions. After trailing by 15 points in the second half, Loyola rallied to force an overtime period, and won the game 60–58 on a basket by Vic Rouse with one second left. The Ramblers earned their first championship in men's college basketball.

== Background ==
=== Cincinnati Bearcats ===
The 1962–63 Bearcats were coached by Ed Jucker, who was in his third season on the job. In the previous two seasons, Cincinnati won the national championship, defeating Ohio State in the 1961 and 1962 national championship games. The Bearcats were attempting to become the first program ever to win the NCAA Tournament for a third consecutive year. They began the season as the number-one ranked team in the AP Poll. Their first game was a 97–39 win over DePauw on December 1, after which they defeated Virginia by 49 points. Cincinnati won its next three games by double-figure margins, before traveling to Kansas, where the team posted a 64–49 victory at Allen Fieldhouse. In their next contest, Dayton became the first team to avoid a double-digit defeat against the Bearcats, losing 44–37 in Cincinnati's lowest-scoring game of the season.

After three more victories brought the Bearcats' record to 10–0, the team began play in the Missouri Valley Conference (MVC) with a January 5, 1963 home game against Wichita (now known as Wichita State), the eighth-ranked team in the country. By a 63–50 score, Cincinnati maintained their perfect record. The Bearcats remained undefeated through mid-February; their victories included a 62–53 win at third-ranked Illinois, along with seven MVC games. On February 16, the Bearcats suffered their first and only defeat of the regular season: in a second game against Wichita, the Shockers prevailed by one point, 65–64. Cincinnati won their next four games, ending the regular season with a 23–1 record. The Bearcats remained the top-ranked team in the AP Poll throughout the season, and they won the MVC championship with an 11–1 conference record, four games ahead of second-place Wichita.

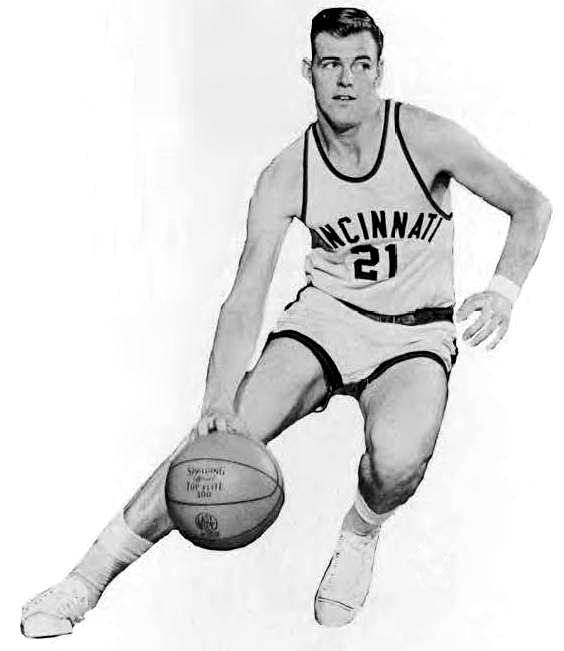
Cincinnati's leading scorer Ron Bonham

The Bearcats played conservatively on offense and were the NCAA's leading defensive team statistically, allowing an average of 51.9 points a game to opponents. Their leading scorer was forward Ron Bonham, who averaged 21.0 points per game. Forward Tom Thacker had per-game averages of 15.8 points and 10.0 rebounds, while center George Wilson averaged 15.0 points and a team-high 11.2 rebounds per game. Other regular players included guards Larry Shingleton and Tony Yates, and Ken Cunningham and Dale Heidotting were among the bench players.

Cincinnati received an invitation to the 1963 NCAA tournament, where they were matched up with Texas in the Midwest regional semifinals. After not having to play in the first round, the Bearcats advanced to the regional final with a five-point win. The team then earned a place in the Final Four of the tournament by defeating Colorado 67–60. In the Final Four, they faced Oregon State. After leading by three points at halftime, the Bearcats clinched a berth in the national championship game with an 80–46 victory. Cincinnati held the Beavers to 28.8% shooting for the game, while making 54.9% of their shots; Wilson led the Bearcats with 24 points and made eight of his nine field goal attempts.

=== Loyola-Chicago Ramblers ===
The Ramblers, coached by George Ireland, began the season ranked fourth in the AP Poll. In their first game, against Christian Brothers on December 1, Loyola posted a 114–58 victory. After three more wins by margins of more than 45 points, the Ramblers scored 123 points against Western Michigan, their highest total of the season. A 12-point victory at Indiana followed, after which Loyola defeated 10th-ranked Seattle 93–83. The Ramblers remained undefeated entering 1963, and started the year as the number two team in the country. Their first game in 1963 was a 45-point win over Marshall; the Rambers ultimately won their first 21 games of the season. On February 16, Bowling Green State gave the Ramblers their first loss, by a score of 92–75. After wins in their next three games, Wichita defeated Loyola in the Ramblers' regular season finale, leaving them with a 24–2 record. The Ramblers finished third in the final AP Poll.

In contrast to Cincinnati, the Ramblers played an aggressive style of offensive basketball, and their defense frequently pressed the opposition. With an average point output of 93.9 per game, Loyola led the country in scoring. Jerry Harkness posted a team-high 21.4 points per game, and four other regulars—Les Hunter, John Egan, Vic Rouse, and Ron Miller—each averaged more than 13.0 points per game. Rouse was the Ramblers' leading rebounder, with 12.1 rebounds per game.

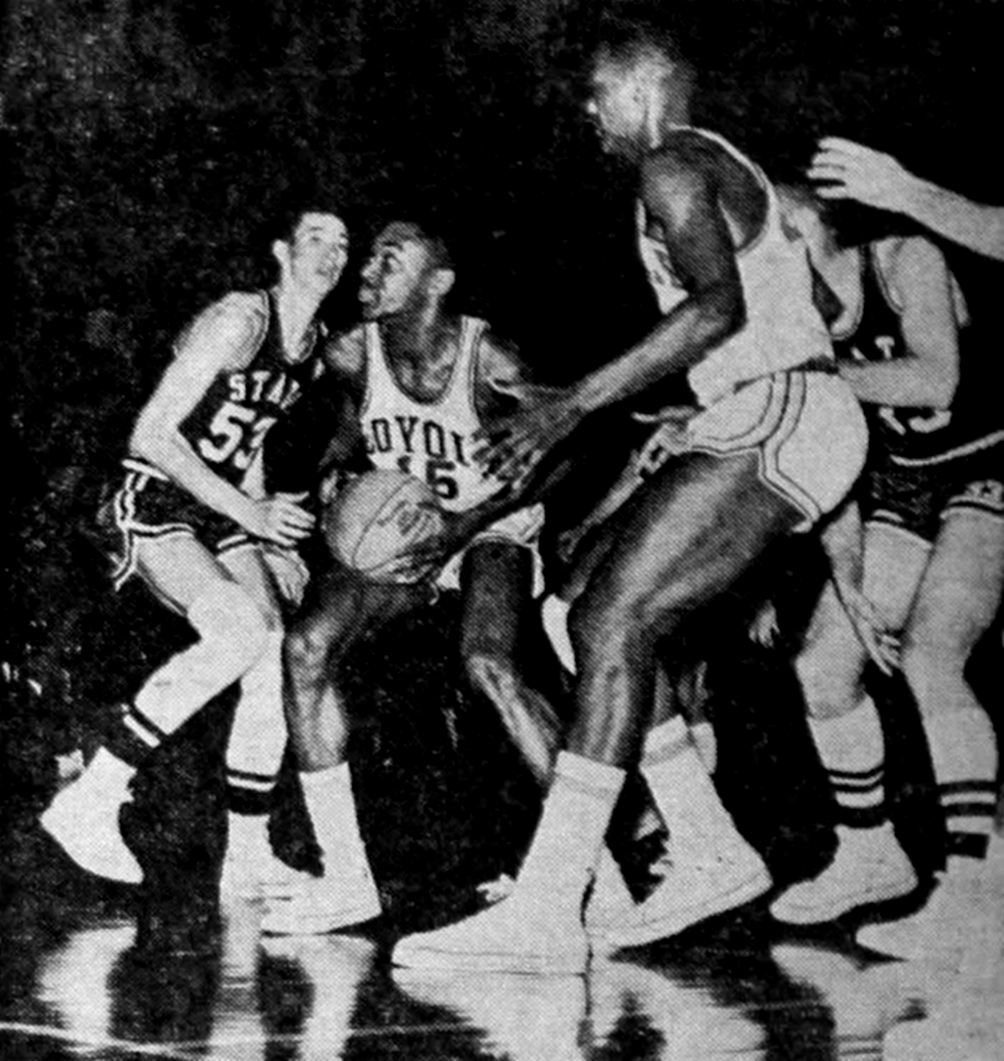
Loyola captain Jerry Harkness earning a lay-up against Mississippi State in the Game of Change earlier in the tournament

Loyola's berth in the NCAA tournament was the first in program history. Unlike Cincinnati, the Ramblers were required to play in the first round; they were placed in the Mideast regional and faced Tennessee Tech. By a 69-point margin, they advanced to the regional semifinals and a matchup with the Mississippi State Bulldogs. At the time, teams from Mississippi were unofficially banned from playing against integrated opponents due to segregation policies in the state. According to USA Today's Mike Lopresti, the Bulldogs "had to rush out of Starkville just to get to the tournament" game in Michigan, which came against a Loyola team with four black starters. The action came despite an injunction in the state, and the resulting contest became known as the Game of Change. The Ramblers advanced with a 61–51 win over Mississippi State.

In the regional final against Illinois, the Ramblers gained a spot in the Final Four with a 15-point victory. There, they faced Duke, the second-ranked team in the country. Ireland, noting Duke's lack of experience against teams with African-American players, claimed before the game that "Any good team with a predominantly Negro lineup could beat them. Behind 29 points by Hunter and 20 from Harkness, Loyola earned a place in the NCAA final by defeating Duke 94–75.

== Game summary ==
The game took place on March 23 at Freedom Hall in Louisville, Kentucky, before an announced crowd of 19,153 spectators, a sellout. Prior to the championship game, a third-place game was held between Final Four losers Duke and Oregon State. The Blue Devils prevailed by an 85–63 score. Cincinnati had six players compete in the game: Bonham, Heidotting, Shingleton, Thacker, Wilson, and Yates. Loyola featured five players for the entire game: Egan, Harkness, Hunter, Miller, and Rouse. Seven of the 10 starters were African-American; this marked the first time that over half the players in the NCAA championship contest were black.

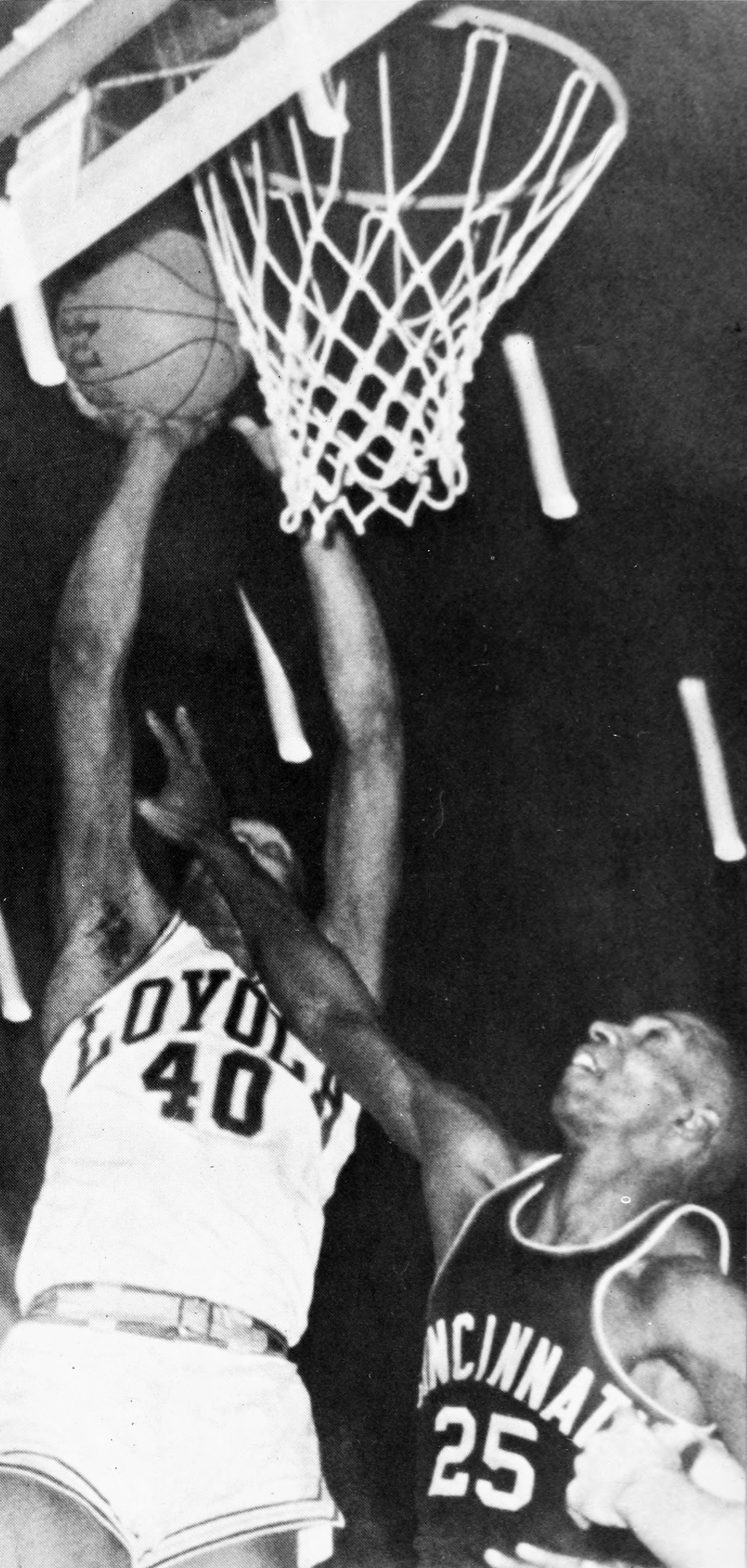
Loyola forward Vic Rouse shoots over Cincinnati's Tom Thacker.

Loyola's shooters started the game slowly, missing all but one of their first 14 field goal attempts. Early on, the Bearcats took a 19–9 lead, as picks by Shingleton set up Bonham to score. The Ramblers' poor shooting continued for the rest of the first half, as they missed 26 of 34 shots and Harkness was held scoreless. At halftime, the Bearcats held a 29–21 advantage. Sports Illustrated's Ron Fimrite wrote that "The Bearcats' lead was not so much the product of an impenetrable defense as of a Rambler offense decidedly out of whack."

The Bearcats extended their advantage at the beginning of the second half. Behind a streak of three consecutive field goals by Bonham, Cincinnati made five of six attempts at one point. Just over six minutes into the second half, the Bearcats held a 15-point advantage, 45–30. However, they were required to make a substitution a few minutes later after Wilson was called for a foul, his fourth of the game; he was briefly benched in favor of Heidotting. The Bearcats suffered from an accumulation of fouls as the second half progressed, as Thacker and Yates picked up four fouls each and neared the point of fouling out. Still, Cincinnati maintained a 48–36 lead into the final eight minutes. In response to the high number of Cincinnati players with numerous fouls, Jucker ordered his team to play more conservatively on offense, stalling to keep their lead intact; they were not required to shoot due to the lack of a shot clock. Hunter later cited this decision as a turning point, saying that it took the Bearcats out of their offensive rhythm. Cincinnati turned the ball over repeatedly, as Loyola made a scoring run that put them back into the game. After more than 35 minutes without a basket, Harkness made two in under 10 seconds, the second following a Bearcats turnover. The Ramblers' 18–3 run brought them to within 48–45. Cincinnati then stretched their lead back to five with 3:42 left in regulation, before the Ramblers made the score 50–48.

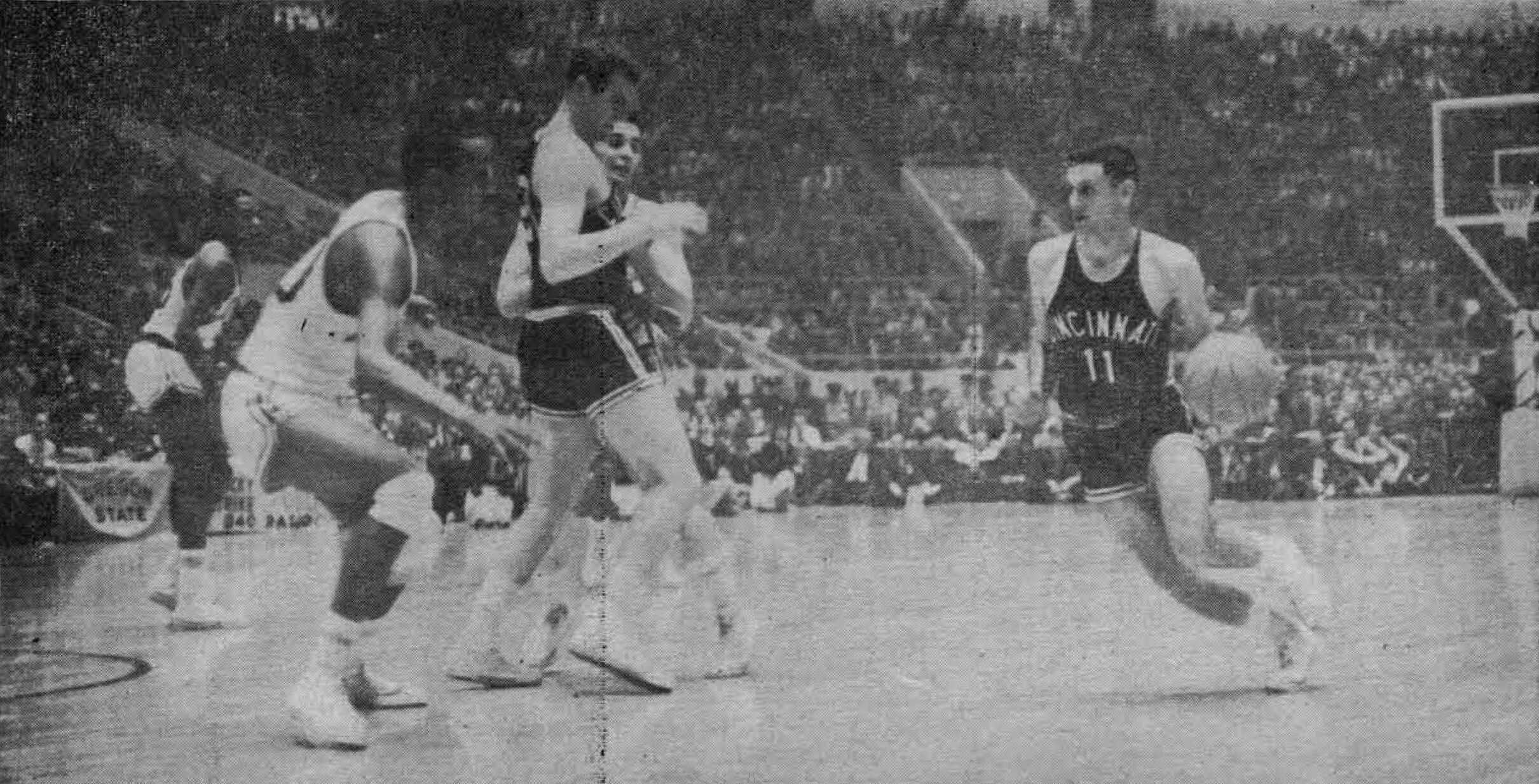
Larry Shingleton of Cincinnati drives to the basket.

Although Loyola had closed their deficit, the Bearcats continued to stall on offense. A field goal by Hunter cut Cincinnati's advantage to one point, 51–50, entering the final minute. The Bearcats came out of their stall and ran a fast break, which was capped by a Thacker basket. With 17 seconds on the clock, Hunter responded by scoring again, bringing the Ramblers back within one point. Harkness fouled Shingleton with 12 seconds on the clock, sending him to the free throw line for two attempts. Making both would put the Bearcats on the verge of winning the NCAA championship, as there were no three-point field goals at the time. After making one free throw, Shingleton was off on his second try, and Hunter secured the rebound for Loyola. Miller received the ball and juggled it briefly; Ireland and Fimrite believed that he had been guilty of traveling, but it was not called a violation on the court. Miller passed the ball to Harkness, who attempted a 12-foot jumper. His shot was good, tying the game at 54–54. Jucker attempted to call a timeout, but the referees did not hear his request due to crowd noise and the clock expired with the game still tied. A five-minute overtime period was required to break the deadlock. Three previous NCAA finals had needed one, including the Bearcats' 1961 title game.

The extra period was described as "a cautious game of cat-and-mouse" by Mal Florence of the Los Angeles Times. The opening tip of overtime was won by Rouse and controlled by Hunter. Harkness received a pass from Hunter and scored on a layup, giving the Ramblers the lead. Wilson responded with a basket for the Bearcats, before a long-distance shot by Miller restored a two-point lead for the Ramblers. Loyola later had an opportunity to extend their advantage, but missed a field goal attempt; after coming down with the rebound, Thacker made a long pass to Shingleton, and a resulting layup evened the score at 58–58. The game remained tied with under two minutes on the clock, as the Ramblers called a timeout with possession of the ball and subsequently went into a slow-paced offense themselves. Play was stopped with 1:21 remaining, as a jump ball was required to determine possession; Egan and Shingleton jumped against each other. Egan earned possession for Loyola, and the Ramblers held the ball to attempt the last shot of the overtime period. Harkness drove to the basket with about seven seconds on the clock, but elected to pass to Hunter, who attempted a shot. Hunter's effort bounced off the rim, but Rouse rebounded the ball and scored. One second was left on the clock. It expired before Cincinnati could inbound the ball, as the Ramblers won their first national championship in men's basketball, 60–58.

== Statistical summary ==
The Ramblers won despite shooting around 27% from the field (23 of 84). Hunter led Loyola in scoring with 16 points. Rouse contributed 15 points; both Hunter and Rouse made six of 22 field goal attempts. In addition, Rouse led the Ramblers had 12 rebounds, one more than Hunter. Harkness scored 14 points on 5-of-18 shooting. All five starters for Loyola played the entire game without being substituted.

Cincinnati made 22 field goals in the game, but attempted only 45, 39 fewer than Loyola. Turnovers hindered the Bearcats; the Ramblers' defense forced 16 in the game, many more than Cincinnati typically had and 13 more than the Ramblers committed. Bonham led all scorers with 22 points, making half of his 16 shots. In the final 17 minutes, though, he did not attempt a field goal as the Bearcats went into their stall offense. Thacker added 13 points and a game-high 15 rebounds, while Wilson had 10 points and 13 rebounds. Among the Bearcats' starters, only Wilson was substituted.

== Legacy ==
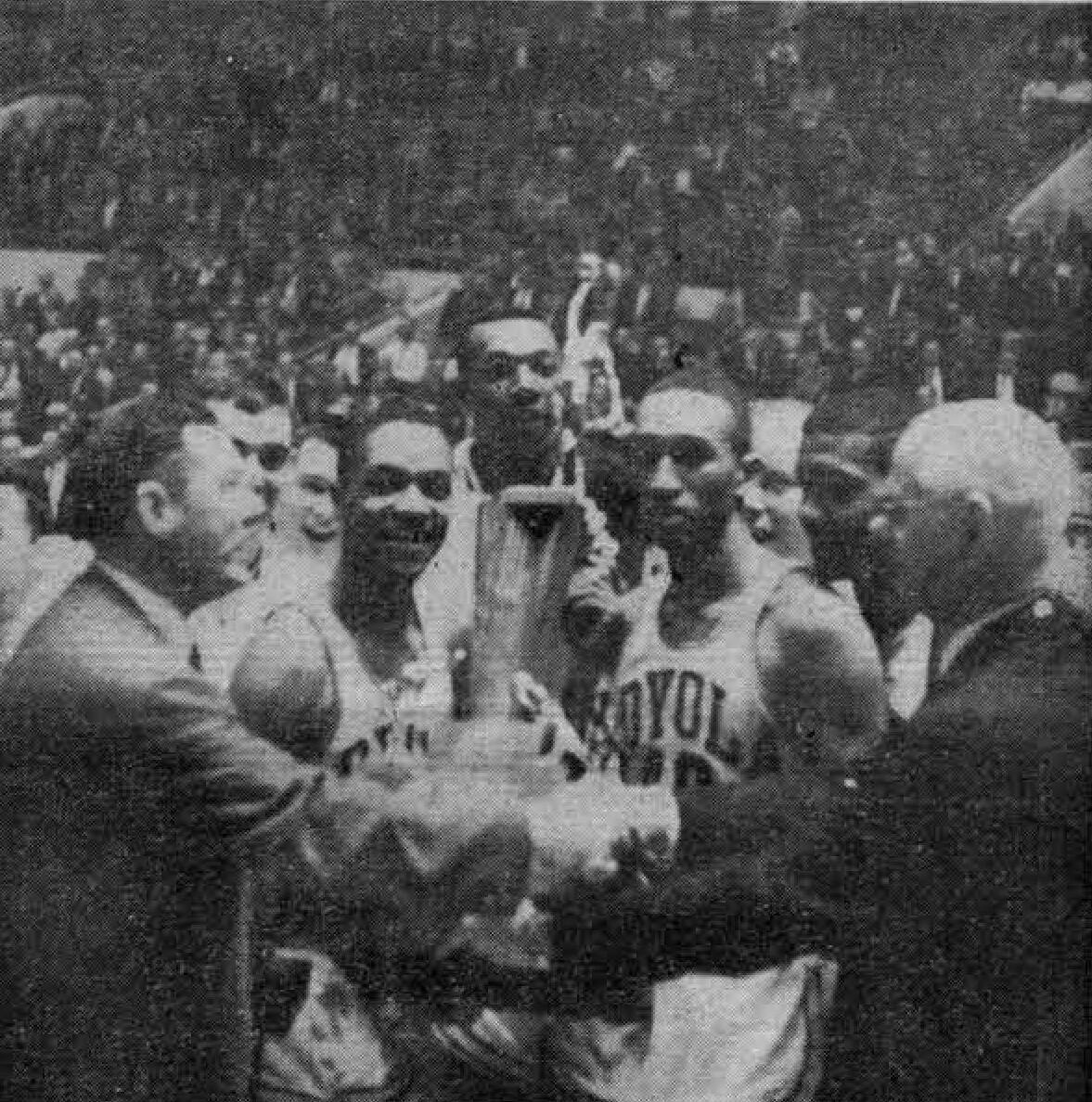
Loyola with the championship trophy

In 2013, author Tom Hager listed the 1963 NCAA championship game as the best ever played in the event. The game has received attention as the first national title contest to feature a majority of black starters; according to Ireland, an "unspoken" rule existed at the time that led to most teams starting only one or two African-Americans at most. However, over time the 1966 championship game, in which an all-African-American Texas Western team defeated an all-white Kentucky squad, became more widely recognized as a key moment in college basketball history. Regardless, Loyola's Miller later said that he believed the game was significant, as it encouraged college coaches to increase their recruiting efforts to black players. He said that the players of the 1963 title game "helped a little, [and] maybe gave some people an opportunity that wasn't there prior to that."

The contest was broadcast on national television on Sports Network Incorporated. It was part of a six-year contract to televise the NCAA championship game annually. In national television ratings, it finished higher than episodes of the shows Gunsmoke and Have Gun – Will Travel that aired during the telecast. In the Ramblers' home market of Chicago, however, the game was broadcast on tape delay, after multiple other sporting events.

The Bearcats had a 17–9 record in the 1963–64 season, but did not play in the 1964 NCAA tournament. Cincinnati has participated in numerous NCAA Tournaments since 1963, but as of 2020 the program has not reached another national championship game. The team has advanced as far as the national semifinals only once, in 1992. Loyola began the 1963–64 season ranked first in the AP Poll and ended up winning 22 games. The Ramblers were again invited to the NCAA tournament, but their title defense ended in the regional semifinals. They appeared in two more NCAA tournaments in the 1960s, but never advanced past the first round. The Ramblers made it to the Sweet Sixteen in 1985. After a 33-year drought, Loyola reached the tournament in 2018, advancing to the Final Four for the first time since 1963. The 1962–63 Ramblers are the only NCAA Division I men's basketball champions from the state of Illinois.

== Bibliography ==
- 2016–17 Cincinnati Basketball Media Guide (PDF). University of Cincinnati. 2016. Archived from the original (PDF) on February 2, 2017.
- 2017 Men's Final Four Records Book (PDF). National Collegiate Athletic Association. 2017.
- Loyola Men's Basketball 2015–16 Fact Book (PDF). Loyola University Chicago. 2015.
- Hager, Tom (2012). The Ultimate Book of March Madness: The Players, Games, and Cinderellas that Captivated a Nation. MBI Publishing Company. ISBN 978-1-61058-668-9.
