= Game of Change =

1963 college basketball game

1963 NCAA tournament mideast regional semifinal
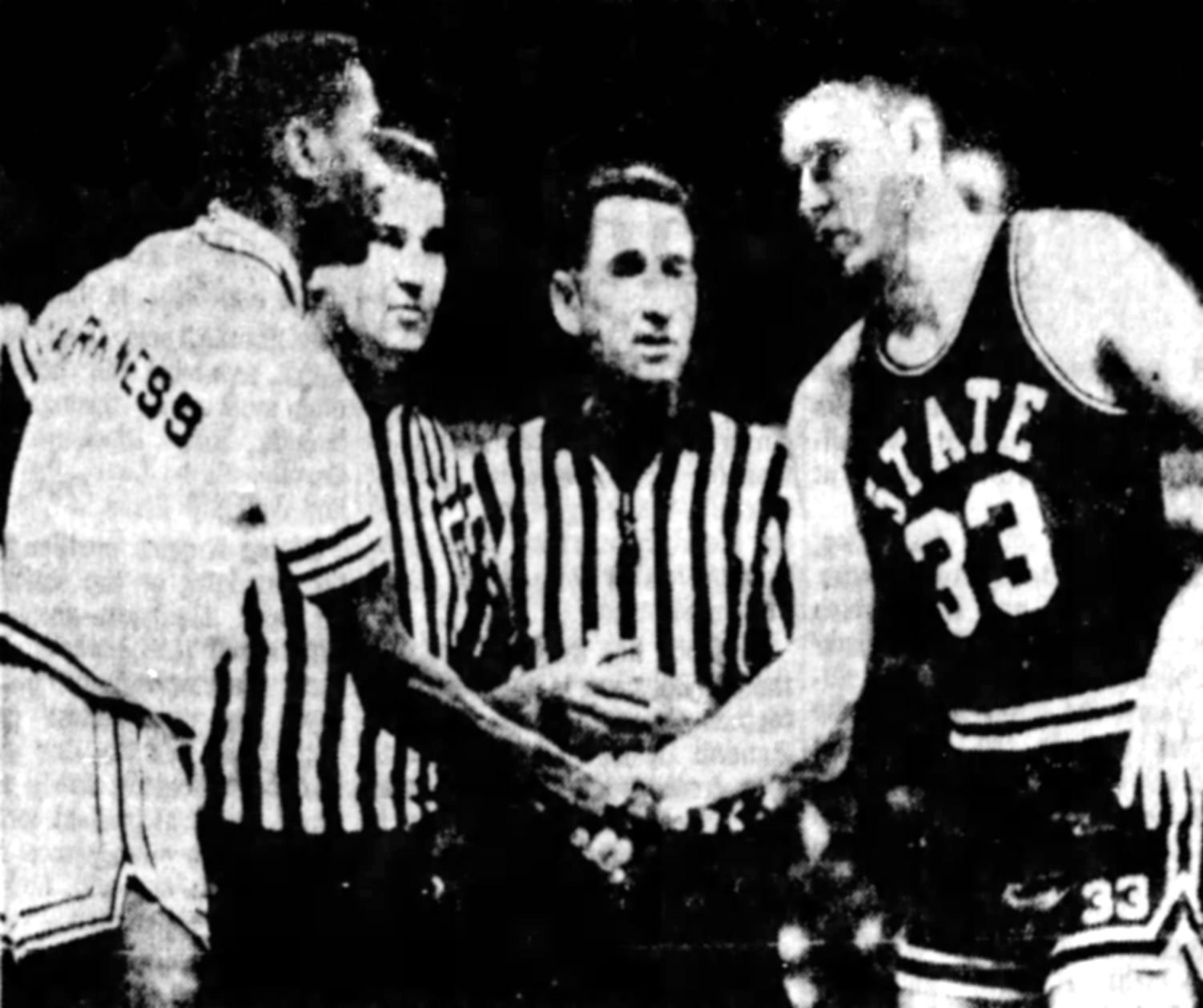
- Captains Jerry Harkness and Joe Dan Gold shake hands before tip-off.
Mississippi State Bulldogs	Loyola Ramblers
(21–5)	(25–2)
51	61
Head coach: Babe McCarthy	Head coach: George Ireland
- AP: 6
- Coaches: 7
- AP: 3
- Coaches: 4
	1st half	2nd half	Total
Mississippi State Bulldogs	19	32	51
Loyola Ramblers	26	35	61
- Date: March 15, 1963
- Venue: Jenison Fieldhouse, East Lansing, Michigan
- Referees: Philip Fox, John Stevens
- Attendance: 12,143

The Game of Change was a college basketball game played between the Loyola Ramblers and the Mississippi State Bulldogs on March 15, 1963, during the second round of the 1963 NCAA University Division basketball tournament, at Jenison Fieldhouse in East Lansing, Michigan. Taking place in the midst of the American civil rights movement, the game between the racially integrated Loyola team and the all-white Mississippi State team is remembered as a milestone in the desegregation of college basketball.

In an era when teams typically played no more than two black players at a time, Loyola had four black starters. Despite regularly facing racism on the road, Loyola finished the 1962–63 regular season with a dominant 24–2 record. Mississippi State came into the postseason with their fourth Southeastern Conference (SEC) title in five years; however, due to an unwritten law that Mississippi teams would never play against black players, they had never before participated in the NCAA tournament. When university president Dean W. Colvard announced that he would send the team to the tournament, several state officials objected and attempted to restrain the team in the state. Employing a plan involving decoy players, the Bulldogs avoided being served an injunction as they took a charter plane to Michigan the day before the game.

Loyola had advanced to the second round after beating Tennessee Tech by 69 points, the largest margin of victory in tournament history, while Mississippi State had received a first round bye. The regional semifinal game was preceded by a handshake between Jerry Harkness, a black Loyola player, and Joe Dan Gold, a white Mississippi State player. Loyola won the game 61–51 and would ultimately win the entire NCAA tournament with a victory over Cincinnati in the championship game.

== Background ==
=== Loyola-Chicago ===
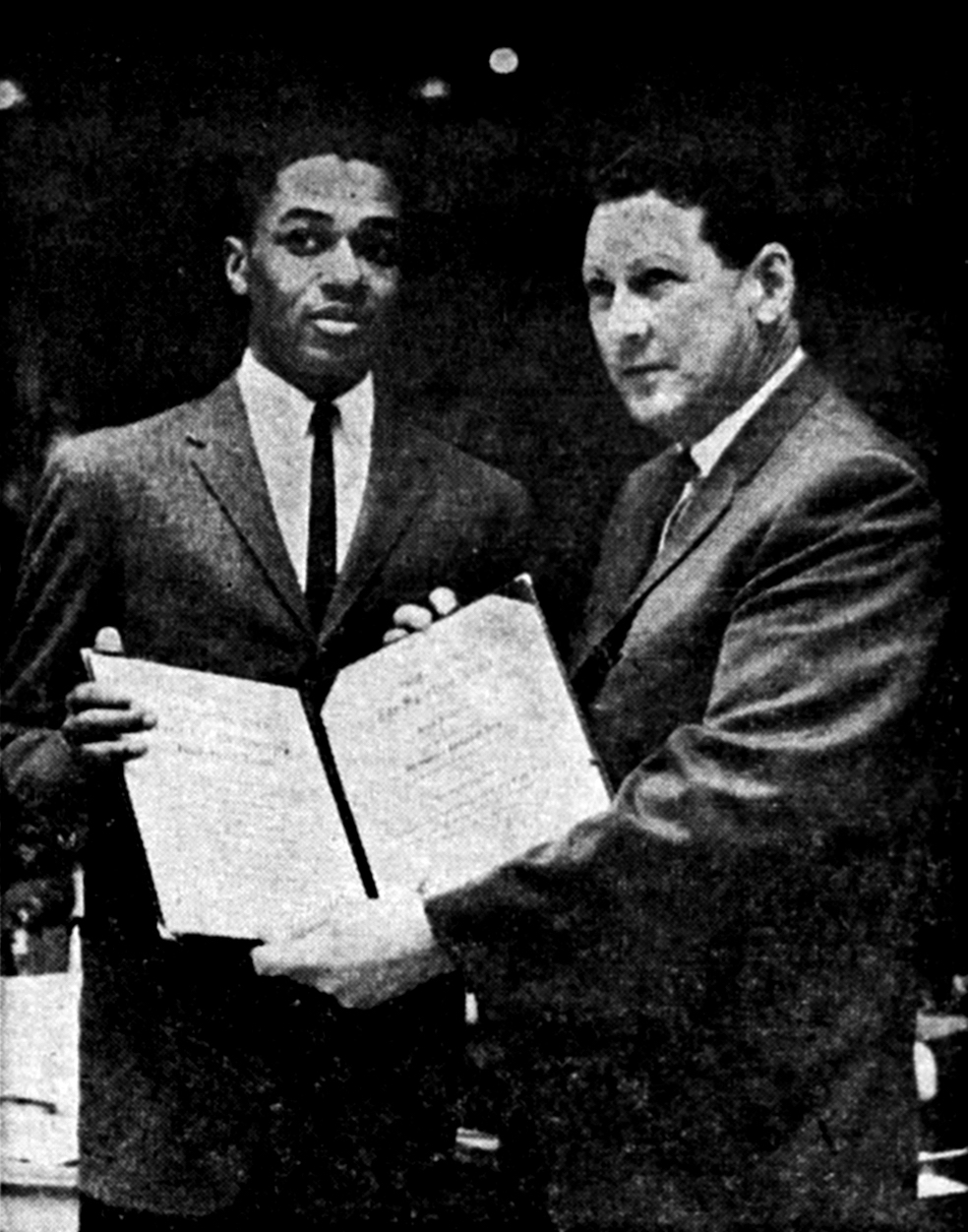
Loyola coach George Ireland presents Jerry Harkness with an All-American award.

In the early 1960s, college basketball had an unwritten rule that teams should only play two or three black players at a time. For the first decade of his career, Loyola head coach George Ireland had obeyed this rule. In the Ramblers' 1961–62 season, Ireland's starting lineup had three black players (Jerry Harkness, Vic Rouse, and Les Hunter) and two white players (Jack Egan and Mike Gavin). As the season progressed, however, sophomore Ron Miller developed as a guard, and Rouse says several players felt that Miller should have been starting over Gavin. Miller said he was told explicitly by Ireland that he could not play him because of the limit of three black players. After falling to Dayton in the semifinal of the 1962 National Invitation Tournament, however, Ireland was "tired of losing", according to Egan. The following night, he violated the unwritten rule for the first time by starting Harkness, Rouse, Hunter, Miller, and Egan in the NIT consolation game.

Loyola performed well with this lineup, and Ireland would go on to use the same five throughout the 1962–63 season. According to Ireland, this stance on black players made him unpopular in the basketball world; he once said that other coaches "used to stand up at banquets and say, 'George Ireland isn't with us tonight because he's in Africa — recruiting.'" This animosity was persistent, and the Loyola players regularly faced discrimination on the road. In January 1962, the Ramblers had planned to stay at Xavier University of Louisiana while traveling to a game against Loyola of New Orleans; however, this plan fell through at the last minute, and the black and white players were forced to find separate lodgings. Chicago news outlets reported on Ireland's outrage at the situation, although some of his players later suggested he played up the controversy. Another incident took place on February 23, 1963, when Loyola faced a hostile crowd at Houston road game. The spectators at the University of Houston, which would not fully desegregate until the next fall, shouted racial slurs, threw popcorn, ice, and pennies, and chanted, "Our team is red hot. Your team is all black."

Despite these troubles, the Ramblers performed well on the court, and they concluded the regular season with a 24–2 record. They remained in the top five rankings throughout their campaign, and ultimately finished at No. 3 in the AP Poll and No. 4 in the Coaches Poll. On February 18, Loyola was awarded one of eleven at-large bids for the NCAA tournament. In the tournament's first round game on March 11, the Ramblers defeated Tennessee Tech 111–42, the largest margin of victory in tournament history as of 2025. This led them to face Mississippi State, who had received a first round bye, in the mideast regional semifinal on the campus of Michigan State University in East Lansing, Michigan.

=== Mississippi State ===
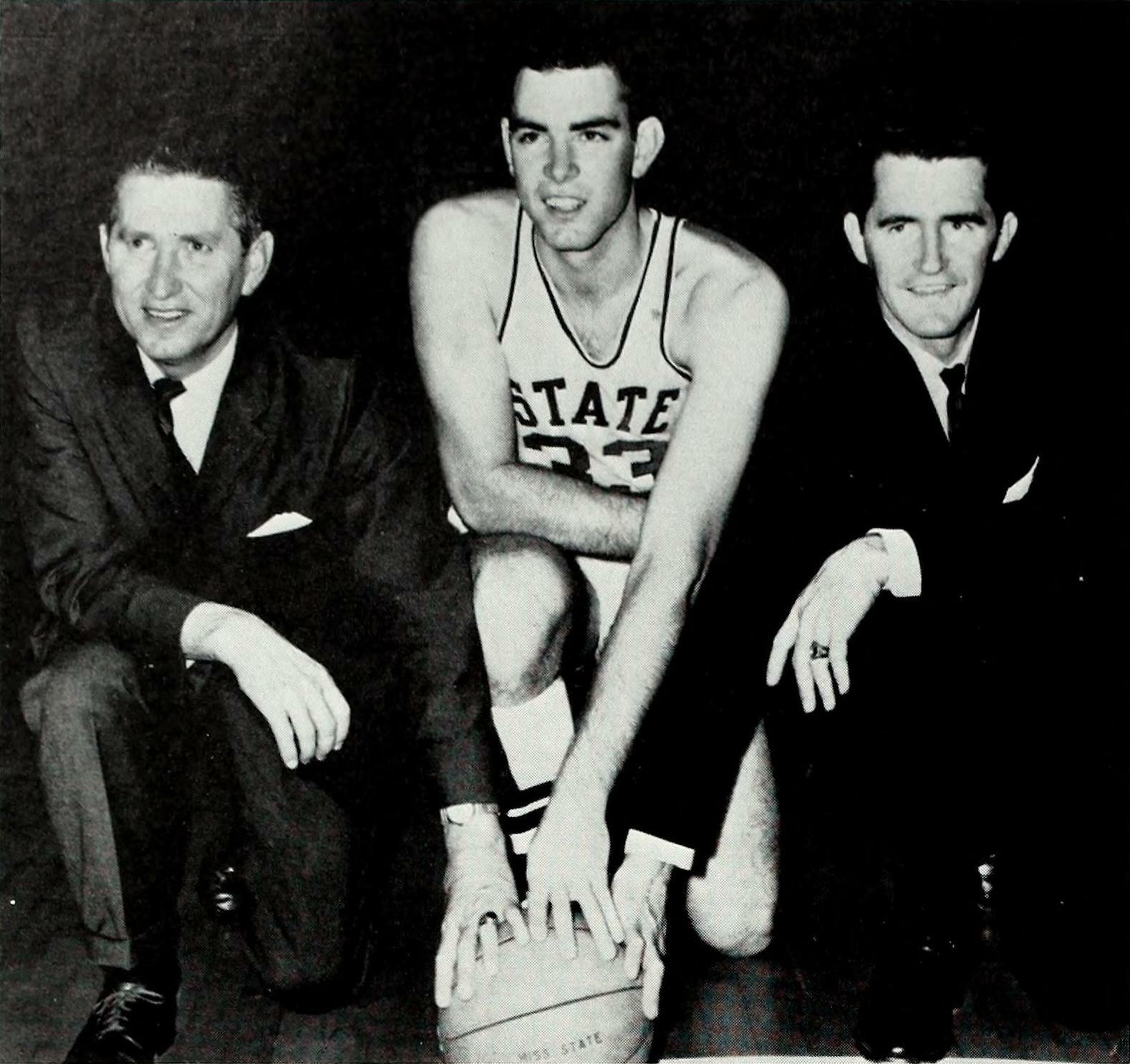
Head coach Babe McCarthy, captain Joe Dan Gold, and assistant coach Jerry Simmons

In the late 1950s and early 1960s, head coach Babe McCarthy led the Mississippi State Bulldogs to much success in the Southeastern Conference (SEC). Starting with the 1958–59 season, they won the SEC title four times in five years. They entered the 1962–63 season with high expectations after their 24–1 record the previous season, appearing at No. 7 in the Coaches Poll. After starting the year with a 7–2 record, they briefly dropped out of the national poll, but soon reappeared after starting SEC play with 8 wins to 1 loss. They won the SEC title outright with a win over Ole Miss on March 2. They finished the season at No. 6 in the AP Poll and No. 7 in the Coaches Poll. After winning nine of their final eleven games, Mississippi State finished the regular season with 21 wins and 5 losses.

However, at that time there existed an "unwritten law" that Mississippi teams would not play against racially integrated teams. Since 1946, when a football game between Mississippi State and an integrated Nevada team was cancelled, it had been the custom in Mississippi to decline any invitation to face teams with black players. This became a greater point of contention as McCarthy's successes repeatedly earned NCAA tournament invitations, and the coach increasingly expressed his discontent at being held back from the national stage. After Kentucky took the Bulldogs' slot at the 1962 NCAA tournament, McCarthy was quoted saying, "I think the boys should be allowed to play against integrated teams away from home", and further, "I feel that the majority of the people in Mississippi would favor our playing integrated teams out of the state." Early in the 1962–63 season, some of McCarthy's players recall him committing to do everything he could to make a tournament appearance happen that season.

As the civil rights movement was gaining traction around the country, the unwritten law began to face opposition from outside the team as well. On February 25, 1963, the Bulldogs secured a tournament invitation with a win over Tulane, and that night, hundreds of students gathered outside the home of Dean W. Colvard, president of Mississippi State University since 1960, chanting "we want to go". Over the next two days, Mississippi State's student senate voted unanimously to recommend that the Bulldogs accept the tournament invitation and gathered 2,000 student signatures on a resolution to the same effect.

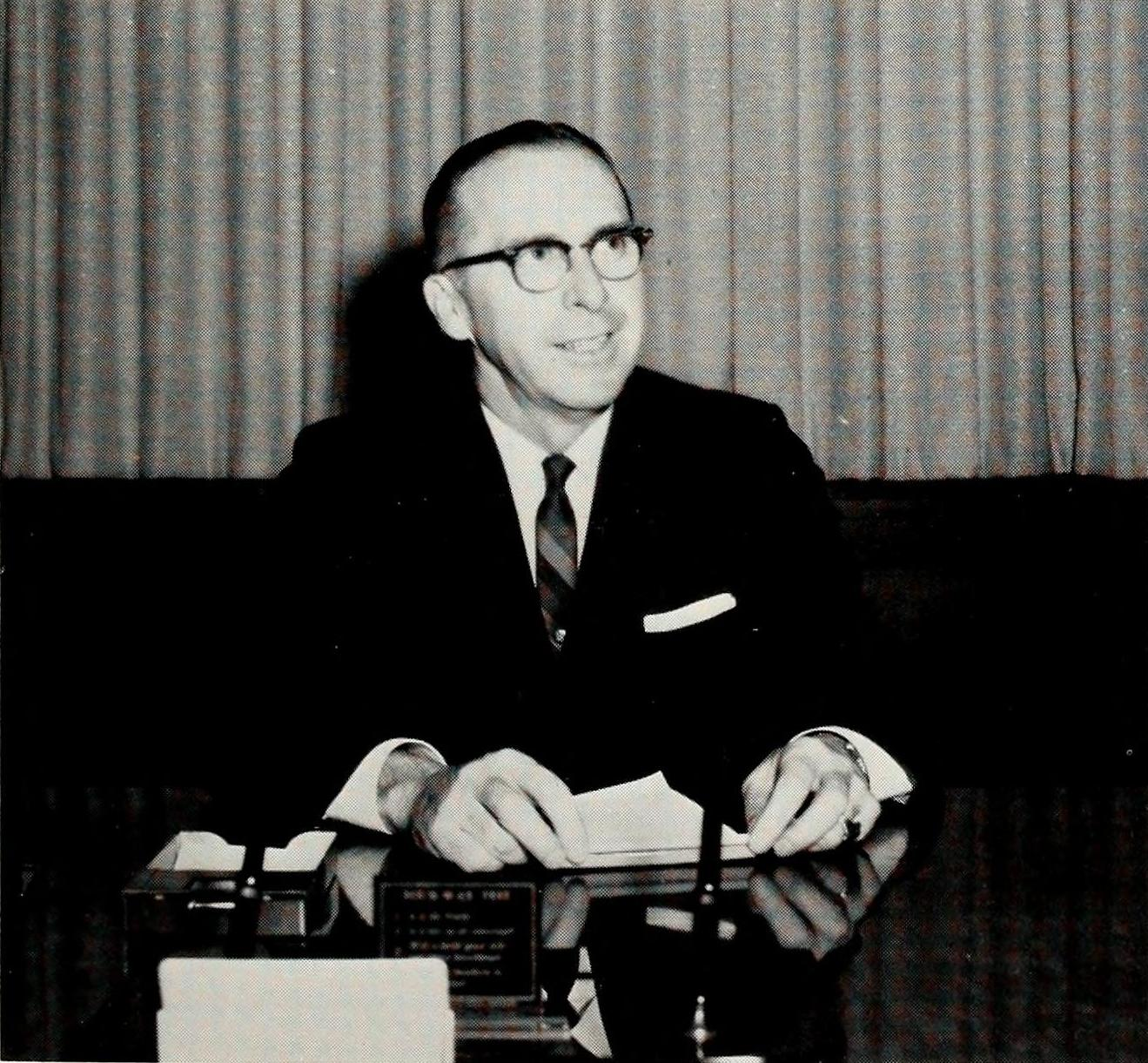
Dean W. Colvard, president of Mississippi State

The decision ultimately fell upon Colvard, who was being bombarded with calls, telegrams, and letters from people across the state. Most who contacted him were in favor of playing; of the 389 letters in Mississippi State's archives, 333 were in favor of going to the tournament. Colvard had personally been in favor of attending the tournament in 1961 and 1962, but the question never came directly to him, and he felt he lacked the political capital to oppose figures such as Governor Ross Barnett on this issue so early in his presidency. In 1963, however, the issue did come to his desk, and he felt he had the opportunity to act. The previous year, Barnett had attempted to pressure the state board of higher education into denying the admission of James Meredith as the first black student at the University of Mississippi. This political interference prompted a warning from the Southern Association of Colleges and Schools and jeopardized the accreditation of Mississippi state schools. This forced Barnett to step back from the issue, and Colvard felt he had some leeway. On March 2, 1963, Colvard issued a statement announcing that he would be sending the team to the tournament "unless hindered by competent authority".

Colvard's decision sparked widespread debate within the state of Mississippi. Many local newspapers ran columns that decried the decision as treasonous or as a threat to the state's unity; one anonymous letter wrote that "something more than the game will be lost". Several Mississippi legislators, including State Senator Billy Mitts, State Representative Russell Fox, and State Rep. Walter Hester, expressed their disapproval of the decision. In a statement, Hester wrote, "This action follows the Meredith incident as an admission that Miss. State has capitulated and is willing for the Negroes to move into that school en masse." State Sen. Sonny Montgomery, on the other hand, was alone amongst his colleagues in publicly voicing support for the decision. Sending the team to the tournament was also favored by the players themselves, who unanimously indicated their desire to play when interviewed by The Clarion-Ledger, as well as by the general public, with a poll conducted by WJTV and WSLI reporting 85% approval.

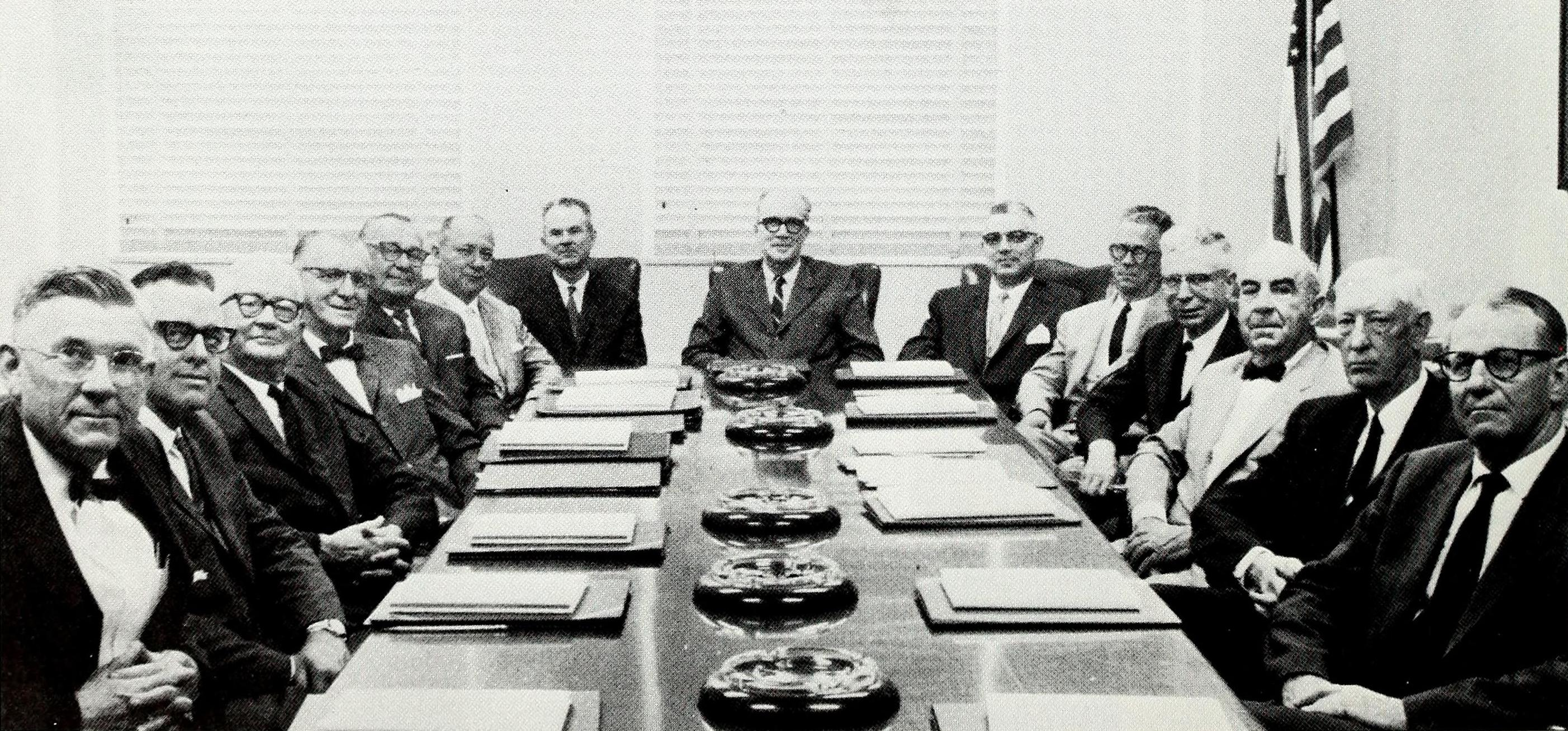
Mississippi's board of higher education voted 8–3 in support of sending the Bulldogs to the tournament.

On March 5, the state board of higher education announced they would be holding a special session to review Colvard's decision. The meeting was convened by trustee M. M. Roberts of Hattiesburg, whom Sports Illustrated's Alexander Wolff describes as a "tenacious lawyer and proud racist". Barnett opposed Colvard's decision in a prepared statement on March 6, writing, "Personally, I feel it is not for the best interest of Mississippi State University, the state of Mississippi, or either of the races." When the board met several days later in Jackson, Mississippi, protesters and petitioners on both sides of the debate were present outside the building. The board voted 8–3 in support of the tournament decision, and 9–2 in a vote expressing confidence in Colvard's leadership.

Nevertheless, participation in the game was still opposed by many in the state. On the afternoon of March 13, State Sens. Billy Mitts and B. W. Lawson obtained an injunction from the Chancery Court of Hinds County forbidding the team from playing in the game. That night, the injunction was reportedly received by the Oktibbeha County deputy sheriff, Dot Johnson. Colvard and the university vice president fled to a motel in Birmingham, Alabama, and coach Babe McCarthy and the athletic director headed north to Nashville.

On the morning of March 14, the day before the game was to be played, the team sent trainer Dutch Luchsinger and five reserve players to Starkville airport at 8 a.m. as decoys. Had they been stopped by authorities while trying to board, the rest of the team would have taken a private plane to Nashville and flown commercially to Michigan. The Clarion-Ledger reported that Deputy Sheriff Johnson went to the airport to serve the injunction, but left after learning that the plane had not yet arrived due to delays in Atlanta. Other accounts suggest alternate reasons why Johnson failed, such as that he arrived too late because he stopped to finish his coffee first; historian Michael Lenehan sums up the legend of Dot Johnson as "a deputy sheriff who tried to do his duty, but not too hard".

Regardless of why, it is clear that the reserve squad did not encounter the deputy sheriff when they arrived, and thus returned to campus to reunite with the rest of the team. Thirty minutes later, they received word that the plane was en route, and the entire team headed to the airport together. Facing no further obstruction, their plane took off at 9:44 a.m. They stopped over in Nashville to pick up McCarthy before proceeding to the game site in East Lansing, Michigan. The injunction was suspended later that day by an associate justice of the Supreme Court of Mississippi, and ultimately dismissed ten days later.

== Game summary ==
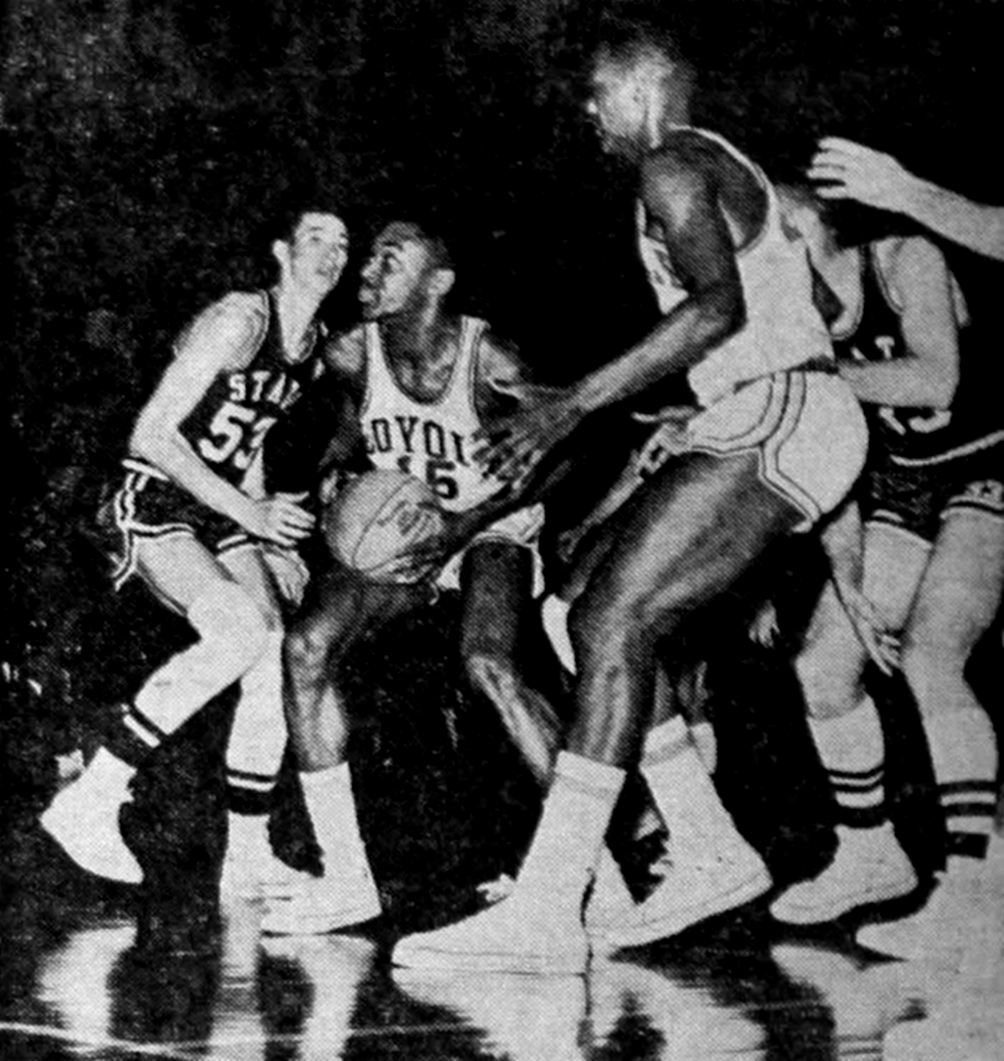
Loyola captain Jerry Harkness about to make a layup over opposing guard Stan Brinker

On game night, Jenison Fieldhouse was packed with a reported crowd of 12,143 in the 12,500-capacity gym. The Loyola–Mississippi State matchup was the second half of a doubleheader, following a 7:30 p.m. game between Illinois and Bowling Green. The game was preceded with a handshake between Jerry Harkness, a black Loyola player, and Joe Dan Gold, a white Mississippi State player. In a 2013 interview, Harkness told NPR of the moment: "The flashbulbs just went off unbelievably, and at that time, boy, I knew that this was more than just a game. This was history being made."

Despite the circumstances, the game itself was played without incident. The underdog Mississippi State team started out with a jump shot and two lay-ups for a 7–0 lead, holding Loyola scoreless for several minutes. Ron Miller ended the shutout, scoring Loyola's first basket with 14:11 remaining in the half. His teammate Jerry Harkness shortly followed it with two three-point plays to bring the game to a 12–12 tie. With 7:01 left, John Egan made a jump shot to give Loyola the lead. Thanks to several missed Bulldogs free throws, Loyola led Mississippi State 26–19 at halftime.

With Vic Rouse and Les Hunter leading in field goals and rebounds, Loyola stretched its lead to 39–29 with 13:15 left in the second half. However, Mississippi State's offense picked up the slack, going on a 9–1 scoring run and narrowing the score to 41–38 with 10:55 remaining. The Bulldogs remained competitive in the game until forward Leland Mitchell, their leading scorer and rebounder, fouled out with 6:47 left. With Rouse scoring eight points in the final six minutes, Loyola's lead grew to 57–42, and the Bulldogs were never able to recover. The Ramblers won with a final score of 61–51.

After the game, Loyola coach George Ireland praised Mississippi State as "the most deliberate offense we ran into all year". Bulldogs coach Babe McCarthy attributed Loyola's win to strength in rebounding – the Ramblers had 44 rebounds to Mississippi State's 25 – and said he thought his team would have had to play "a near perfect game" to beat the Ramblers.

== Box score ==
Friday, March 15
9:30 p.m. EDT

Mississippi State 51, Loyola-Chicago 61
Scoring by half: 19–26, 32–35
Pts: L. Mitchell – 14; Rebs: L. Mitchell – 11	Pts: J. Harkness – 20; Rebs: V. Rouse – 19

Jenison Fieldhouse – East Lansing, Michigan
Attendance: 12,143
Referees: Philip Fox, John Stevens

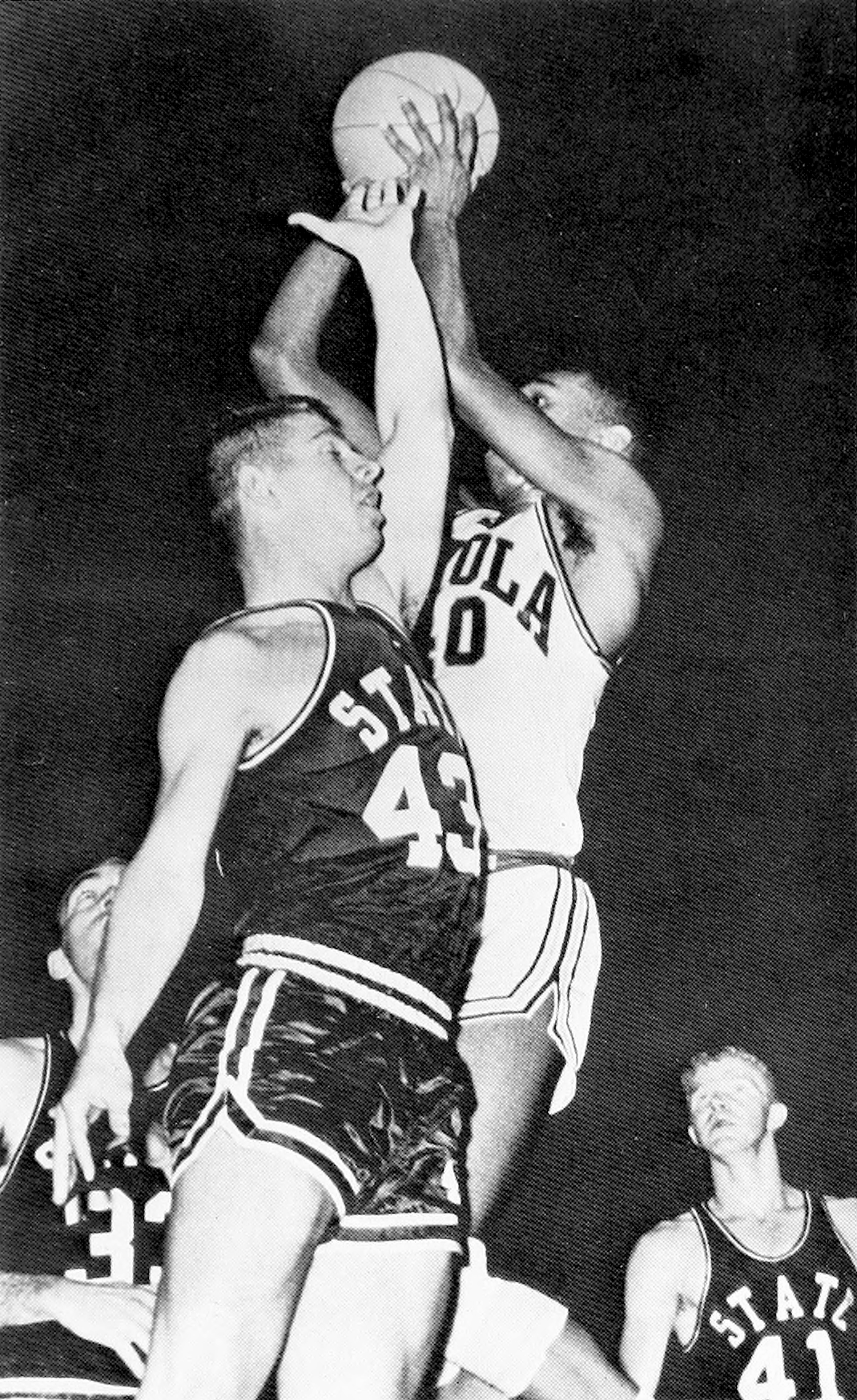
Loyola forward Vic Rouse shoots over Mississippi State's Aubrey Nichols.

Legend
No.	Jersey number	Pos	Position	FGM	Field goals made
FGA	Field goals attempted	FTM	Free throws made	FTA	Free throws attempted
Reb	Rebounds	PF	Personal fouls	Pts	Points

Mississippi State Bulldogs
No.	Player	Pos	FGM	FGA	FTM	FTA	Reb	PF	Pts
44	Leland Mitchell	F	6	10	2	5	11	5	14
33	Joe Dan Gold	F	3	9	5	7	3	3	11
42	Doug Hutton	G	5	9	0	2	1	0	10
53	Stan Brinker	G	3	6	3	5	7	4	9
41	Red Stroud	G	3	15	1	1	3	2	7
43	Aubrey Nichols	G	0	0	0	0	0	0	0
Team totals			20	49	11	20	25	14	51
Statistics from Sports-Reference.com, rosters from game program

Loyola Ramblers
No.	Player	Pos	FGM	FGA	FTM	FTA	Reb	PF	Pts
15	Jerry Harkness	F	7	11	6	7	9	1	20
40	Vic Rouse	F	8	24	0	0	19	4	16
41	Les Hunter	C	3	13	6	7	10	3	12
42	Ron Miller	G	5	9	1	1	4	1	11
11	John Egan	G	1	9	0	1	1	5	2
23	Chuck Wood	G/F	0	0	0	0	1	3	0
Team totals			24	66	13	16	44	17	61
Statistics from Sports-Reference.com, rosters from game program

== Aftermath ==
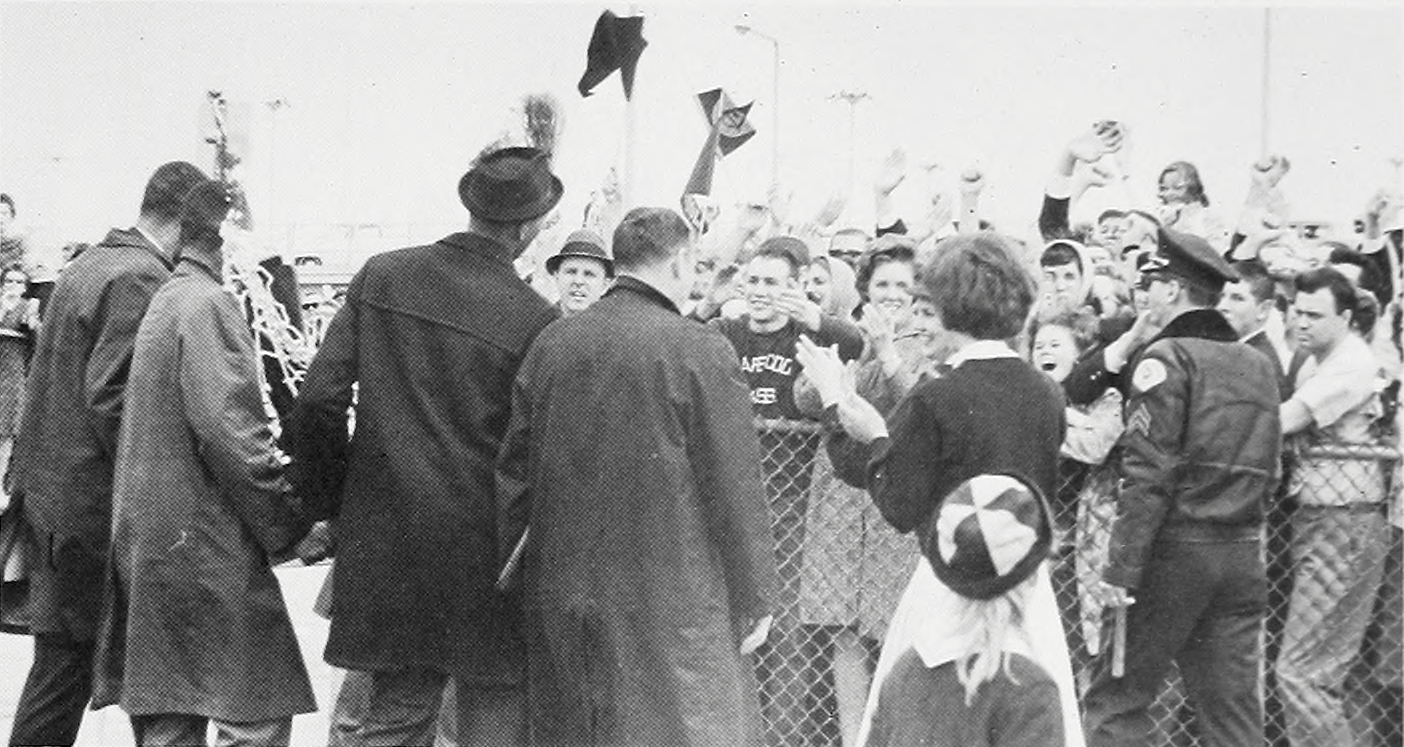
The Ramblers show off their championship trophy as they arrive home at O'Hare International Airport.

After defeating Mississippi State, Loyola faced Illinois from their home state for the regional final. After outrebounding Illinois 65 to 49, Loyola held a 28-point lead with 3:50 remaining. Harkness scored 33 points in the 79–64 victory. Loyola was considered a slight favorite heading into the national semifinal game against Duke. Loyola led the entire game, and the score was 44–31 at half. An Art Heyman basket brought Duke within three points late in the second half, but Loyola rallied with a 10–0 scoring run and proceeded to a 94–75 victory. In the championship game, the Ramblers went to overtime against Cincinnati before ultimately winning by a score of 60–58. It was the first national championship in Loyola-Chicago history, and as of 2026, it remains the only national championship for the state of Illinois.

The day after the Loyola game, Mississippi State faced Bowling Green in a consolation game. They won 65–60, and returned to Starkville as the third place team from the mideast region. Upon landing at the airport in Mississippi, they were greeted by a crowd of 700–1000 fans. In the weeks that followed, Barnett-appointed trustees on the state board of higher education made proposals to formalize the unwritten law or require board involvement in future decisions, but the board voted these proposals down. In 1965, Mississippi State became an integrated campus when Richard Holmes became the first black student to enroll.

== Legacy ==
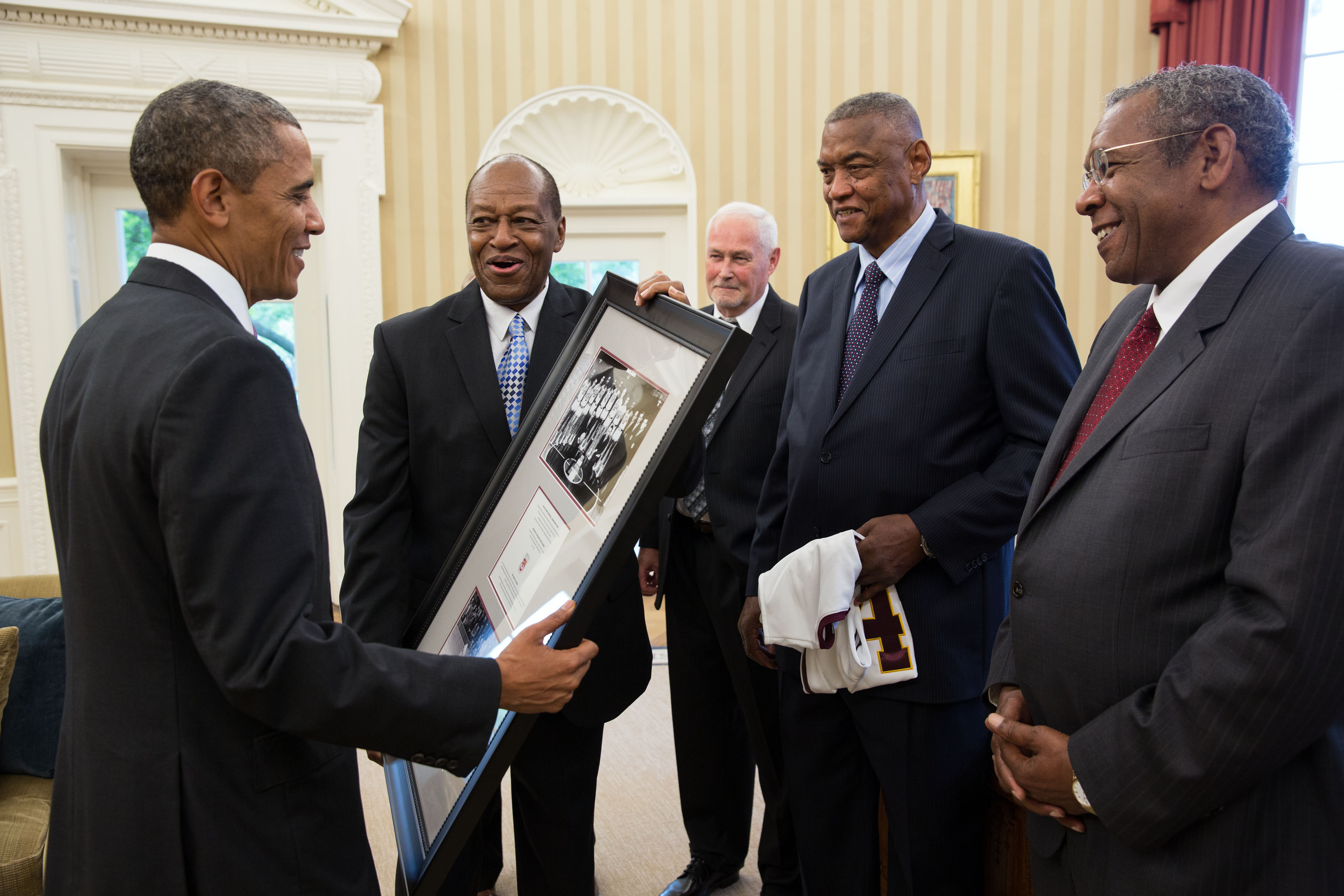
President Obama meets with members of the 1962–63 Loyola team for their 50th anniversary.

The 50th anniversary of the Game of Change was marked with a number of commemorative events. On December 15, 2012, Mississippi State visited Loyola for the teams' first meeting since the 1963 tournament. With surviving players from both of the historic teams present, Loyola won by a score of 59–51. On July 10–11, 2013, members of the 1962–63 Loyola team reunited for a two-day trip to Washington, D.C. On the first day, they toured the Capitol Building and met privately with Senator Dick Durbin and House Minority Leader Nancy Pelosi, and on the second day, they met with President Barack Obama in the Oval Office. On November 24, 2013, the 1962–63 Loyola team was inducted into the National Collegiate Basketball Hall of Fame, the first time an entire team was inducted collectively. The team was also inducted into the Chicagoland Sports Hall of Fame on September 18, 2013.

The 1962–63 Loyola Ramblers are often overlooked, or overshadowed by the 1965–66 Texas Western Miners, who won the 1966 NCAA championship with an all-black starting lineup over an all-white Kentucky team. The Miners' story gained prominence after the 2006 release of the film Glory Road, a dramatic retelling of the 1965–66 season and championship game. Jerald Harkness, a filmmaker and son of Loyola player Jerry Harkness, had pitched movie studios in the early 2000s on a dramatization of the 1962–63 Loyola Ramblers, but was turned down as Glory Road was already in production. Harkness went on to produce the documentary film Game of Change, which was released in 2008. The game is also memorialized in several books.

The overall significance of the Game of Change to the civil rights movement has been debated. In a 2018 opinion piece for The Washington Post, Kevin Blackistone argues that the game did not actually bring about much change. Blackistone points to significant setbacks that the movement faced in Mississippi after the game, such as the murder of Vernon Dahmer and the shooting of James Meredith at the March Against Fear, and suggests that the modern narrative of celebrating the game serves to whitewash history instead of preserving it. In a response letter to the editor, journalist Charles Paikert contends that, although the game did not cause sudden major change to ongoing racial tensions in the South, it did show that white athletes and students rejected the unwritten rule against interracial sports competitions. He further writes that the national publicity garnered by Loyola's championship run was a "big deal" in 1963.
