= Vic Rouse (basketball) =

College basketball player

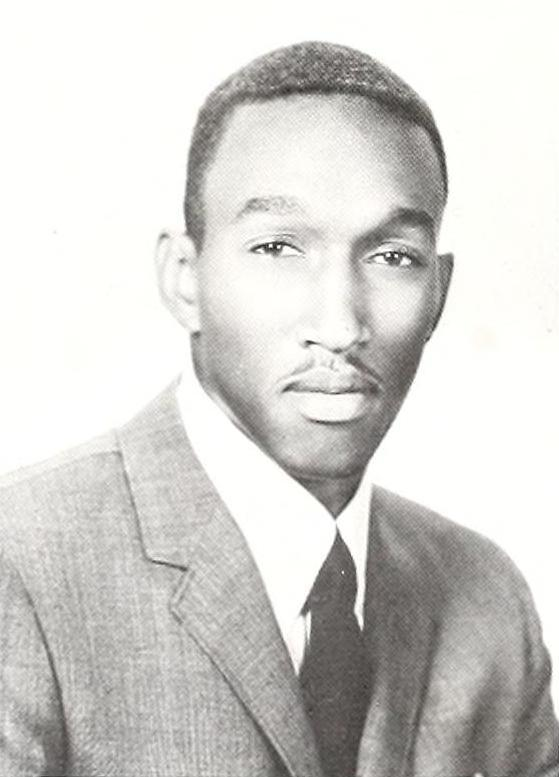
- Rouse in his senior year at Loyola

Personal information
- Born: March 15, 1943 East St. Louis, Illinois, U.S.
- Died: May 31, 1999 (aged 56) Annapolis, Maryland, U.S.
- Listed height: 6 ft 7 in (2.01 m)

Career information
- High school: Pearl (Nashville, Tennessee)
- College: Loyola Chicago (1961–1964)
- NBA draft: 1964: 7th round, 60th overall pick
- Drafted by: Cincinnati Royals
- Position: Power forward
- Number: 40

Career highlights
- NCAA champion (1963); AP honorable mention All-American (1964); No. 40 retired by Loyola Ramblers
- Stats at Basketball Reference

Walter Victor Rouse (March 15, 1943 – May 31, 1999) was an American college basketball player. He was an All-American at Loyola University of Chicago and is best remembered for hitting the game-winning shot as time expired in the overtime period of the 1963 NCAA championship game.

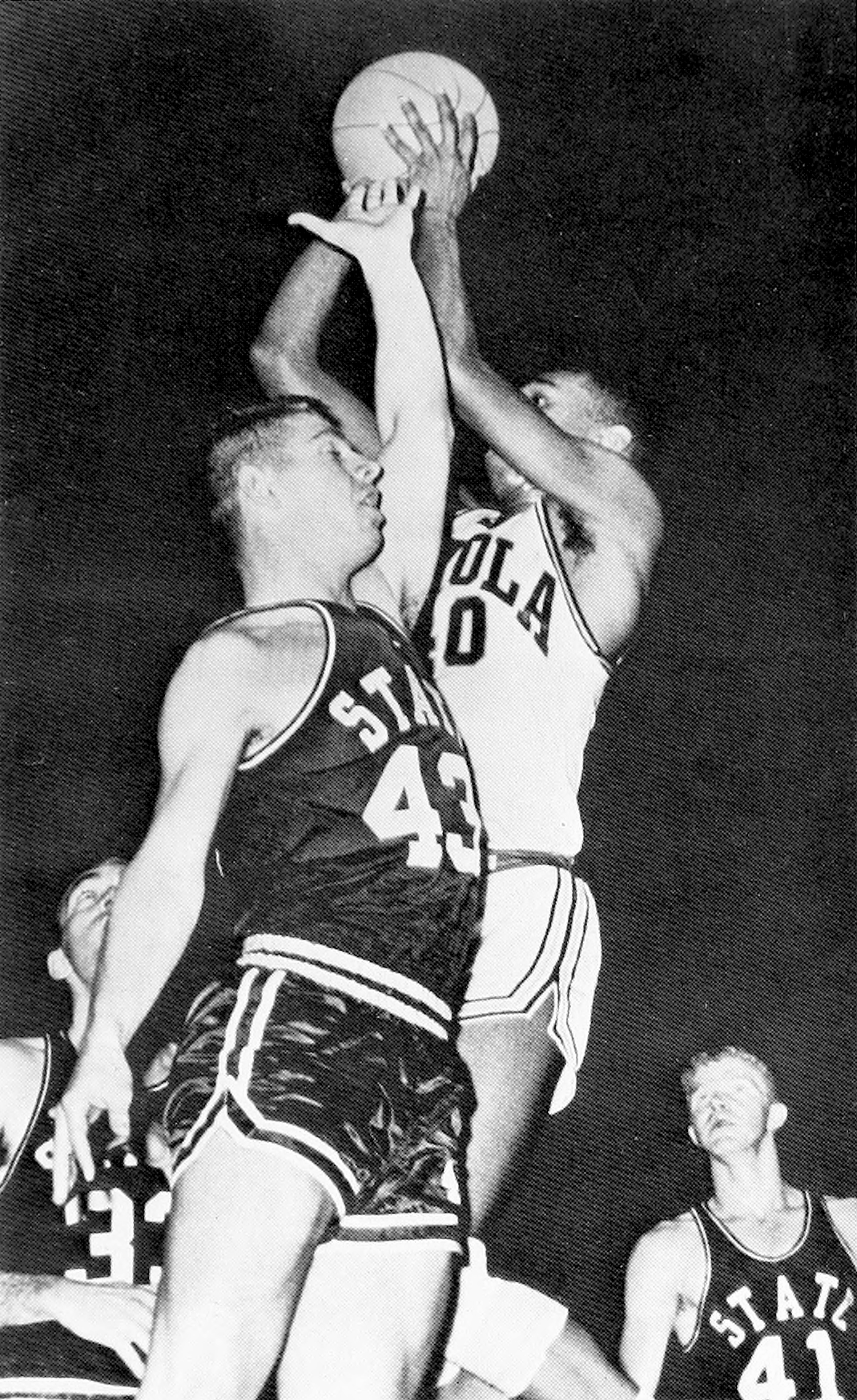
Rouse shooting over a Mississippi State player in the 1963 regional semifinal

Rouse, a 6'7" forward from Pearl High School in Nashville, Tennessee, played college basketball for Loyola for coach George Ireland. He, along with high school teammate Les Hunter, joined the Ramblers and helped them become the first NCAA champion to feature four African-American starters in his junior year. Rouse anchored the middle, leading the team in rebounding as a sophomore (11.3 per game) and junior (12.1 per game). In the championship season of 1962–63, Rouse averaged 13.5 points.

Rouse is best known for following Hunter's miss as time expired to defeat Cincinnati and spoil that school's bid to win a third straight NCAA title. The shot gave Loyola its first, and so far only, NCAA basketball championship. Rouse and the four other Loyola starters played the entire championship game, without substitution.

In his senior year, Loyola returned four starters and had eyes on repeating as champions. Rouse upped his averages to 15.6 points and 12.5 rebounds per game. However, he dislocated his shoulder early in the season, hampering his effectiveness. Rouse was still named an honorable mention All-American at the close of the season. Rouse scored 1,169 points and grabbed 982 rebounds in his Loyola career. His #40 jersey was retired in 1993.

Following the close of his college career, Rouse was drafted by the Cincinnati Royals in the 1964 NBA draft (seventh round, 60th pick); however, he never played in the league. Instead, Rouse earned three master's degrees and a PhD. During his postgraduate academic study, he served as a student member of the Southern Illinois University Board of Trustees from 1971 to 1974. He owned his own educational consulting firm and taught courses at the University of Maryland.

On July 11, 2013, to observe the 50th anniversary of the national championship, President Barack Obama welcomed surviving Loyola players Hunter, Jerry Harkness, John Egan and Ron Miller to the Oval Office to honor the team. The entire squad was then inducted in November of that year by the College Basketball Hall of Fame.

He died on May 31, 1999, in Annapolis, Maryland at age 56.
