= Leland Mitchell =

American basketball player

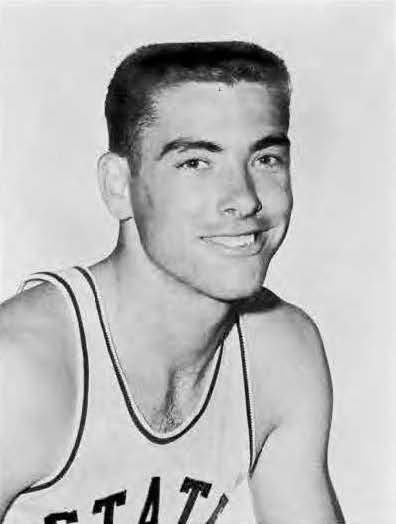
- Mitchell with Mississippi State

Personal information
- Born: February 22, 1941 Kiln, Mississippi, U.S.
- Died: July 6, 2013 (aged 72) Starkville, Mississippi, U.S.
- Listed height: 6 ft 4 in (1.93 m)
- Listed weight: 210 lb (95 kg)

Career information
- High school: Kiln (Kiln, Mississippi)
- College: Pearl River CC (1959–1960); Mississippi State (1960–1963)
- NBA draft: 1963: 2nd round, 14th overall pick
- Drafted by: St. Louis Hawks
- Playing career: 1967–1968
- Position: Shooting guard
- Number: 22

Career history
- 1967–1968: New Orleans Buccaneers

Career highlights
- 2× First-team All-SEC (1962, 1963)
- Stats at Basketball Reference

Leland Mitchell (February 22, 1941 – July 6, 2013) was an American basketball player.

== College ==
A 6'4" shooting guard, Mitchell played at Mississippi State University under Babe McCarthy during the early 1960s. He was an All-Southeastern Conference honoree in 1963, a season in which Mississippi State lost to eventual champion Loyola University Chicago in the regional semifinals of the NCAA Tournament.

MSU's appearance in the tournament was controversial in their home state. To that point, MSU's all-white teams had only played against other all-white teams, but the NCAA Tournament was open to integrated teams, including Loyola, which fielded four black starters. The school had to sneak out of town to reach the tournament, since an unwritten Mississippi law prevented racial integration on the basketball court. Mitchell later said, "We wanted to play. We had just won the SEC championship for the third year in a row and we hadn't been allowed to play in the NCAA Tournament the past two years. For us, the biggest thing was getting the opportunity to play in the tournament because it was something we felt we deserved." He also noted, "It was much more than a basketball game. We were making history. We were ambassadors for the south, though none of us realized it at the time".

In the regional semifinal, now known as the Game of Change, Mitchell had 14 points and 11 rebounds against Loyola before fouling out with over six minutes left. The Chicago Tribune identified Mitchell's absence down the stretch as the key to Loyola's victory, noting, "Mitchell was a great performer and the only southerner who could rebound with [Loyola]." Mitchell was later named to the All-Tournament Team, along with Jerry Harkness of Loyola, Dave Downey of Illinois, Howard Komives of Bowling Green State University, and Nate Thurmond, also of Bowling Green.

== Professional career ==
Mitchell was later selected by the St. Louis Hawks in the second round of the 1963 NBA draft. He never played for the Hawks, but spent the 1967–68 season in the American Basketball Association as a member of the New Orleans Buccaneers, who had hired Babe McCarthy as their coach. In 78 games, he averaged 4.1 points and 2.3 rebounds.

Mitchell died at his Starkville, Mississippi home on July 6, 2013. He was 72 years of age.

== Career statistics ==
Legend
| GP | Games played | GS | Games started | MPG | Minutes per game |
| FG% | Field goal percentage | 3P% | 3-point field goal percentage | FT% | Free throw percentage |
| RPG | Rebounds per game | APG | Assists per game | SPG | Steals per game |
| BPG | Blocks per game | PPG | Points per game | **Bold** | Career high |

=== ABA ===
==== Regular season ====
| Year | Team | GP | MPG | FG% | 3P% | FT% | RPG | APG | PPG |
|---|---|---|---|---|---|---|---|---|---|
| 1967–68 | New Orleans | 78 | 14.0 | .349 | .276 | .659 | 2.3 | .9 | 4.1 |

==== Playoffs ====
| Year | Team | GP | MPG | FG% | 3P% | FT% | RPG | APG | PPG |
|---|---|---|---|---|---|---|---|---|---|
| 1968 | New Orleans | 7 | 8.1 | .111 | .000 | .500 | .4 | .4 | .4 |
