= Walter Hester =

American politician

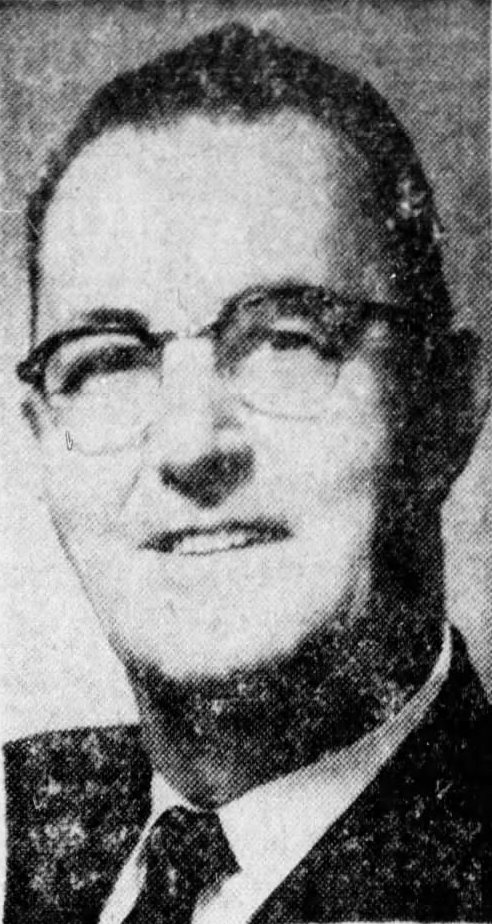
- Hester circa 1960

Personal details
- Born: 1909/1910
- Died: May 25, 1988 (aged 78) Jackson, Mississippi
- Profession: Politician

Walter McCree Hester Sr. was an American politician. He served in the Mississippi state legislature from 1952 to 1964.

Hester was opposed to racial integration of Mississippi schools. He opposed the participation of the 1962–63 Mississippi State Bulldogs men's basketball team in the 1963 NCAA University Division basketball tournament on the grounds that the team would face the majority-black Loyola Ramblers team. The Bulldogs ultimately did participate in the tournament, facing the Ramblers in what is now known as the Game of Change.

Hester died of heart failure on May 25, 1988, in Jackson, Mississippi.
