= Joe Dan Gold =

American basketball player and coach

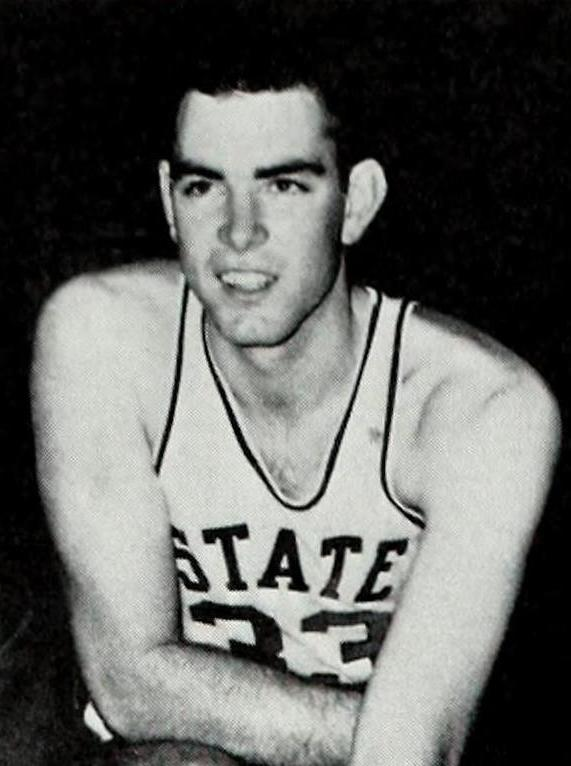
- Gold during the 1962–63 season

Biographical details
- Born: June 7, 1942; Benton, Kentucky, U.S.
- Died: April 14, 2011 (aged 68); West Liberty, Kentucky, U.S.

Playing career
- 1960–1963: Mississippi State
- Position: Forward

Coaching career (HC unless noted)
- 1964–1965: Mississippi State (assistant)
- 1965–1970: Mississippi State
- 1971–1973: Paducah JC
- 1973–1974: Mercer

Head coaching record
- Overall: 67–82

Joe Dan Gold (June 7, 1942 – April 14, 2011) was an American basketball player and coach, most notably at Mississippi State University.

== Early life and college ==
Gold, a 6'5 forward was born in Benton, Kentucky; he played at Mississippi State from 1960 to 1963, where he helped lead the Bulldogs to three shared or outright Southeastern Conference titles playing for coach Babe McCarthy. Gold averaged 12.3 points and 7.8 rebounds per game for his career. He was named third team All-SEC as a senior and was a member of the SEC academic honor roll.

In his senior year, Gold was captain of the first Mississippi State basketball team to compete against African-American players. After turning down NCAA tournament invitations in previous years, Coach McCarthy and his team accepted a bid to the 1963 NCAA tournament (the school's first), where they faced an integrated Loyola of Chicago team in what has since been named the Game of Change. The Bulldogs had to sneak out of the state to play the game, as they defied an order from Mississippi governor Ross Barnett. Gold's pregame handshake with Loyola star Jerry Harkness was the subject of a photograph that was heavily circulated in newspapers across the United States. Loyola won the game and eventually went on to win the national championship that year.

== Coaching career ==
Following the conclusion of his collegiate playing career, Gold turned to coaching. He became the freshman coach at his alma mater and ultimately an assistant to his mentor Babe McCarthy. After McCarthy resigned in 1965, Gold was named head coach at the age of 23. Gold coached the Bulldogs for five years, compiling a record of 51–74 and resigned in 1970.

Gold next coached at Paducah Junior College in Paducah, Kentucky, then took the reins at Mercer in 1973. However, he resigned at the end of his only season there, a successful 16–8 campaign.

== Post coaching career ==
After leaving Mercer, Gold became a school administrator in his native Kentucky. He was enshrined in the Mississippi State Athletic Hall of Fame in 1996.

Gold died on April 14, 2011, following a long illness. He was survived by his wife Rosemarie and two children, John Douglas and JoMarie. The couple lived in West Liberty, Kentucky, at the time of his death.

== Head coaching record ==
Record table
| Season | Team | Overall | Conference | Standing | Postseason |
|---|---|---|---|---|---|
Mississippi State Bulldogs (Southeastern Conference) (1965–1970)
| 1965–66 | Mississippi State | 14–11 | 10–6 | T–3rd | |
| 1966–67 | Mississippi State | 14–11 | 8–10 | T–5th | |
| 1967–68 | Mississippi State | 9–17 | 5–13 | 8th | |
| 1968–69 | Mississippi State | 8–17 | 6–12 | 9th | |
| 1969–70 | Mississippi State | 6–18 | 3–15 | 10th | |
| Mississippi State: | | 51–74 (.408) | 32–56 (.364) | | |
Mercer Bears (NCAA Division I independent) (1973–1974)
| 1973–74 | Mercer | 16–8 | | | |
| Mercer: | | 16–8 (.667) | | | |
| Total: | | 67–82 (.450) | | | |
