= Loyola Ramblers men's basketball =

NCAA Division I team for Loyola University Chicago

| 2026–27 Loyola Ramblers men's basketball team |
- University: Loyola University Chicago
- First season: 1914; 112 years ago
- Head coach: Drew Valentine (6th season)
- Location: Chicago, Illinois
- Arena: Joseph J. Gentile Arena (capacity: 4,486)
- Conference: Atlantic 10
- Nickname: Ramblers
- Colors: Maroon and gold
- Student section: The Pack
- All-time record: 1,317–1,151 (.534)

NCAA Division I tournament champions
- 1963
Other NCAA Division I tournament results
| Final Four | 1963, 2018 |
| Elite Eight | 1963, 2018 |
| Sweet Sixteen | 1963, 1964, 1985, 2018, 2021 |
| Appearances | 1963, 1964, 1966, 1968, 1985, 2018, 2021, 2022 |

Conference tournament champions
- 1985, 2018, 2021, 2022

Conference regular-season champions
- 1980, 1983, 1985, 1987, 2018, 2019, 2021, 2024

Uniforms
| Home | Away |

The Loyola Ramblers men's basketball team represents Loyola University Chicago in Chicago, Illinois. The Ramblers participate as members of the Atlantic 10 Conference. The Ramblers joined the Missouri Valley Conference in 2013, and stayed until 2022. Prior to 2013, the team had spent 34 seasons as a charter member of the Horizon League.

In 1963, Loyola won the 1963 NCAA Division I men's basketball tournament (then the "NCAA University Division") men's basketball national championship under the leadership of All-American Jerry Harkness, defeating two-time defending champion Cincinnati 60–58 in overtime in the title game. All five starters for the Ramblers played the entire championship game without substitution.

Surviving team members were honored on July 11, 2013, at the White House to commemorate the 50th anniversary of their victory. The entire team was inducted in November of that year in the College Basketball Hall of Fame. As of 2025, Loyola remains the only school from the state of Illinois to win a men's Division I basketball NCAA tournament. Loyola's first-round regional victory over Tennessee Tech on March 11, 1963, remains a record for margin of victory (69 points) for any NCAA men's basketball tournament game.

The team gained national publicity again in 2018, as a result of both their Cinderella Story-esque performance in the tournament, in which they upset numerous teams to reach the Final Four as an 11-seed, tying for the lowest seed ever to do so, and the cultural popularity of their team chaplain, the then-98-year-old religious sister Jean Dolores Schmidt ("Sister Jean").

As of February 17, 2021, the team had achieved its highest Kenpom ranking ever, at number nine in the country, with the number one ranked defense.

== History ==
=== Racial integration ===
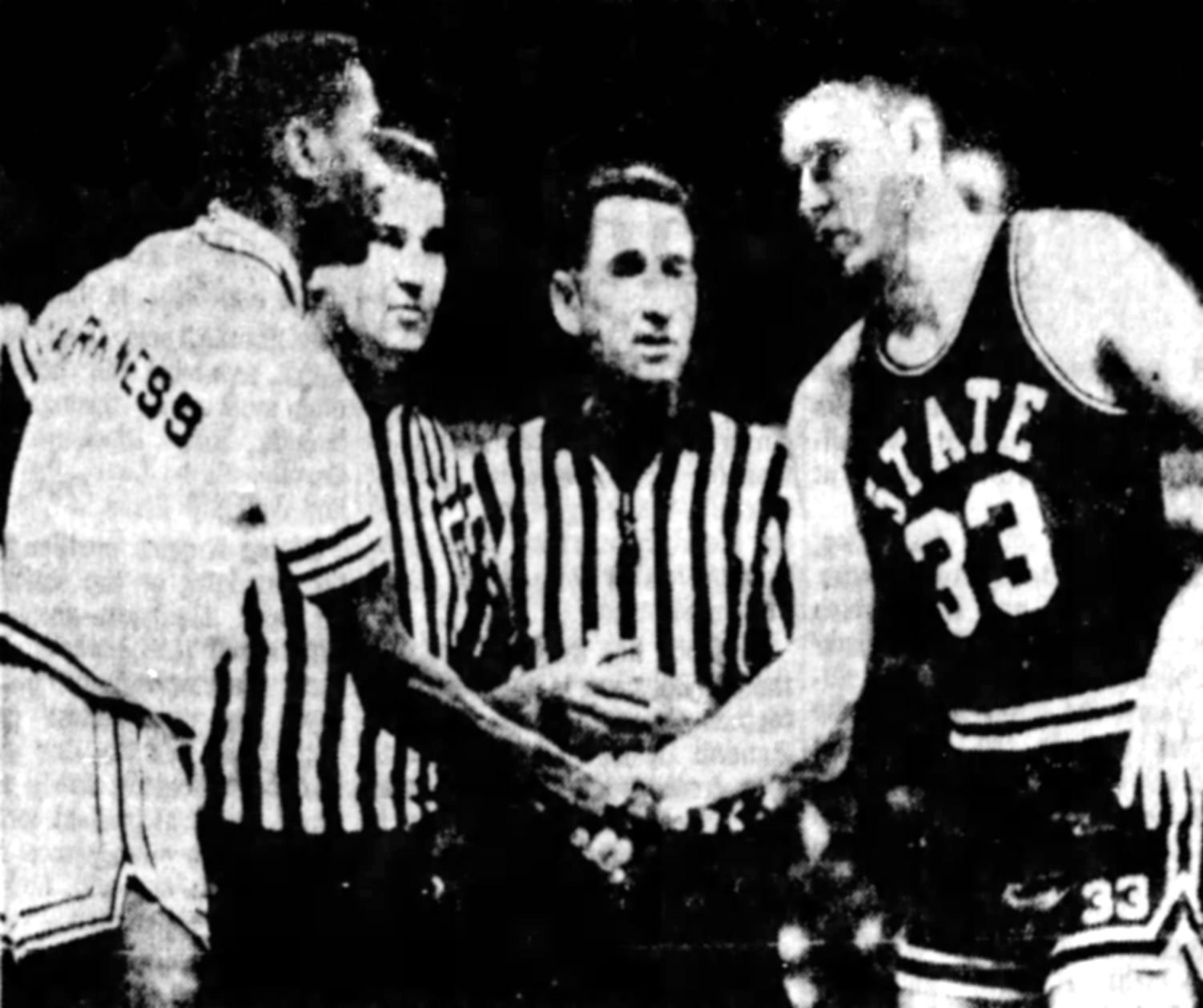
Loyola's Jerry Harkness shaking hands with Mississippi State's Joe Dan Gold ahead of the Game of Change in 1963

The Loyola University Chicago teams of the early 1960s, coached by George Ireland, are thought to be responsible for ushering in a new era of racial equality in the sport by shattering all remaining color barriers in NCAA men's basketball. Beginning in 1961, Loyola broke the longstanding gentlemen's agreement (not to play more than three black players at any given time), putting as many as four black players on the court at every game. For the 1962–63 season, Ireland played four black Loyola starters in every game. That season, Loyola also became the first team in NCAA Division I history to play an all-black lineup, doing so in a game against Wyoming on December 29, 1962. In that season's NCAA tournament, Loyola defeated the all-white team of then-segregated Mississippi State by a score of 61–51, a game especially notable because the Bulldogs defied a state court order prohibiting them from playing against a school with black players. The game has since been dubbed the "Game of Change" in popular culture.

In 1963, Loyola shocked the nation and changed college basketball forever by starting four black players in the NCAA championship game. Loyola's stunning upset of two-time defending NCAA champion Cincinnati, in overtime by a score of 60–58, was the crowning achievement in the school's nearly decade long struggle with racial inequality in men's college basketball, highlighted by the tumultuous events of that year's NCAA Tournament. Loyola's 1963 NCAA title was historic not only for the racial makeup of Loyola's team, but also due to the fact that Cincinnati had started three black players, making seven of the 10 starters in the 1963 NCAA Championship game black.

=== Home venues ===
The team's original home venue was the on-campus Alumni Gym. However, Loyola later moved to play their games at DePaul University's Alumni Hall, and subsequently moved around, with stints at Northwestern University's McGaw Memorial Hall (today known as Welsh Ryan Arena), the University of Illinois at Chicago's Illinois-Chicago Pavilion, and the Chicago Stadium. From 1987 until 1989, Loyola played at the International Amphitheatre, but suffered poor attendance at that venue. From 1989 until 1994, the team played at the Rosemont Horizon (today known as the "Allstate Arena"), but suffered low attendance at the venue and moved back to the on-campus Alumni Gym in 1994. In 1996, the team moved into their current on-campus home, the Joseph J. Gentile Arena, which replaced Alumni Hall.

== Postseason ==
=== NCAA tournament results ===
The Ramblers have appeared in eight NCAA tournaments. Their combined record is 15–7. They were National Champions in 1963. On March 24, 2018, the Ramblers defeated Kansas State 78–62 to advance to play in their second Final Four in school history.

| Year | Seed | Round | Opponent | Result |
|---|---|---|---|---|
| 1963 | – | Round of 25; Sweet Sixteen; Elite Eight; Final Four; National Championship | Tennessee Tech; Mississippi State; Illinois; Duke; Cincinnati | W 111–42; W 61–51; W 79–64; W 94–75; W 60–58 |
| 1964 | – | Round of 25; Sweet Sixteen; Regional 3rd Place Game | Murray State; Michigan; Kentucky | W 101–91; L 80–84; W 100–91 |
| 1966 | – | Round of 22 | Western Kentucky | L 86–105 |
| 1968 | – | Round of 23 | Houston | L 76–94 |
| 1985 | #4 | First Round; Second Round; Sweet Sixteen | #13 Iona #5 SMU #1 Georgetown | W 59–58; W 70–57; L 53–65 |
| 2018 | #11 | First Round; Second Round; Sweet Sixteen; Elite Eight; Final Four | #6 Miami (FL) #3 Tennessee #7 Nevada #9 Kansas State #3 Michigan | W 64–62; W 63–62; W 69–68; W 78–62; L 57–69 |
| 2021 | #8 | First Round; Second Round; Sweet Sixteen | #9 Georgia Tech #1 Illinois #12 Oregon State | W 71–60; W 71–58; L 58–65 |
| 2022 | #10 | First Round | #7 Ohio State | L 41–54 |

=== NIT results ===
The Ramblers have appeared in seven National Invitation Tournaments. They reached the championship game twice, and won the third place consolation game once. Their combined record is 9–6.

| Year | Round | Opponent | Result |
|---|---|---|---|
| 1939 | Semifinals; Championship Game | St. John's; Long Island | W 51–46; L 32–44 |
| 1949 | First Round; Quarterfinals; Semifinals; Championship Game | CCNY; Kentucky; Bradley; San Francisco | W 62–47; W 61–56; W 55–50; L 47–48 |
| 1962 | Quarterfinals; Semifinals; Third Place | Temple; Dayton; Duquesne | W 75–64; L 82–98; W 95–84 |
| 1980 | First Round | Illinois | L 87–105 |
| 2019 | First Round | Creighton | L 61–70 |
| 2024 | First Round | Bradley | L 62–74 |
| 2025 | First Round; Second Round; Quarterfinals; Semifinals | San Jose State; San Francisco; Kent State; Chattanooga | W 73–70; W 77–76; W 72–62; L 73–80 |

=== CBI results ===
The Ramblers have appeared in the College Basketball Invitational (CBI) once, winning it in 2015. Their record is 5–0.

| Year | Round | Opponent | Result |
|---|---|---|---|
| 2015 | First Round; Quarterfinals; Semifinals; Championship Game 1 Championship Game 2 | Rider; Oral Roberts; Seattle; Louisiana–Monroe; Louisiana–Monroe | W 62–59; W 86–78; W 63–48; W 65–58; W 63–62 |

== Retired numbers ==
As of 2022, eight players have had their jerseys retired by the school.

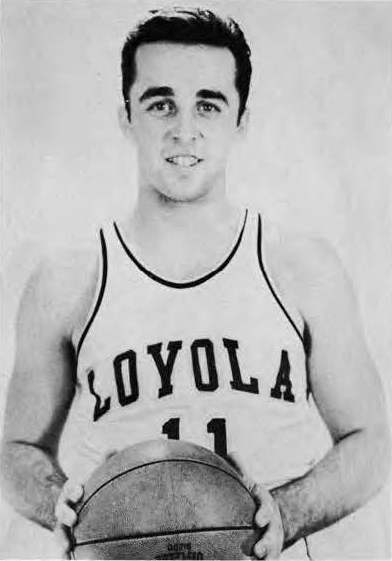
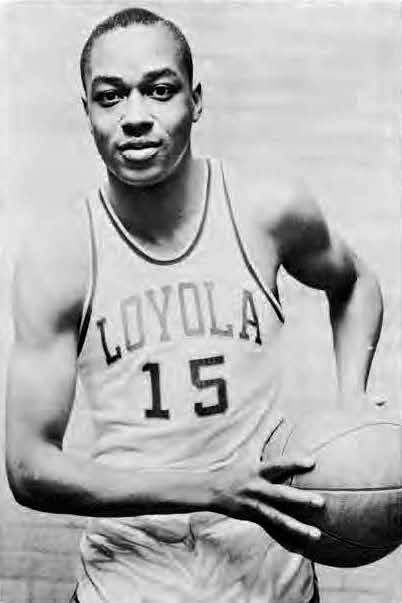
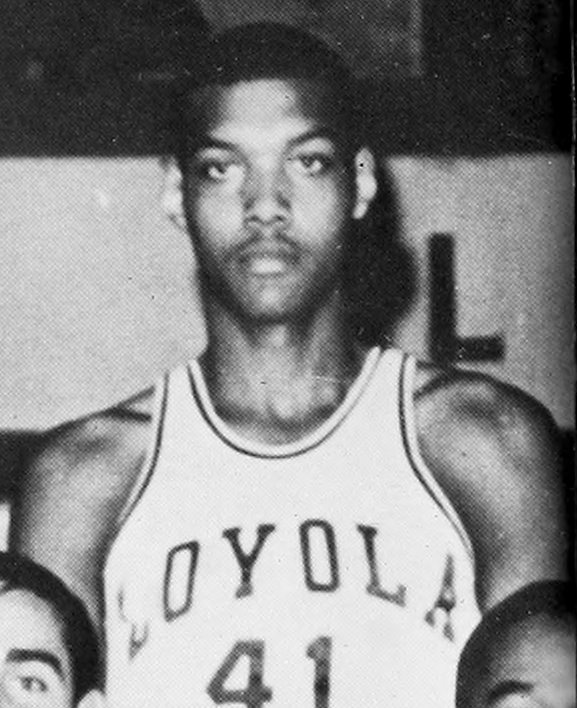
Fltr: John Egan, Jerry Harkness, and Les Hunter, whose numbers 11, 15, and 41 were retired by Loyola

Loyola Ramblers retired numbers
| No. | Player | Career | Ref. |
| 3 | Nick Kladis | 1949–52 | |
| 11 | John Egan | 1961–64 | |
| 15 | Jerry Harkness | 1960–63 | |
| 20 | LaRue Martin | 1969–72 | |
| 21 | Alfredrick Hughes | 1981–85 | |
| 40 | Vic Rouse | 1961–64 | |
| 41 | Les Hunter | 1961–64 | |
| 42 | Ron Miller | 1961–64 | |

== Awards ==
All-Americans

- 1929, 1930 – Charlie "Feed" Murphy
- 1937 – Marv Colen
- 1938, 1939 – Mike Novak
- 1938, 1939 – Wibs Kautz
- 1948 – Jack Kerris
- 1952 – Nick Kladis
- 1962, 1963 – Jerry Harkness
- 1967 – Jim Tillman
- 1970, 1972 – LaRue Martin
- 1982 – Wayne Sappleton
- 1985 – Alfredrick Hughes
- 2006 – Blake Schilb (Honorable Mention)
- 2018 – Clayton Custer (Honorable Mention)
- 2021 – Cameron Krutwig (Third Team)

Academic All-Americans

- 2013 – Ben Averkamp (Second Team)
- 2019 – Clayton Custer (Third Team)
- 2021 – Cameron Krutwig (Second Team)

MCC/Missouri Valley Coach of the Year

- 1985 – Gene Sullivan
- 2018 – Porter Moser

MCC/Horizon League/Missouri Valley Player of the Year

- 1981 – Darius Clemons
- 1982 – Wayne Sappleton
- 1983, 1984, 1985 – Alfredrick Hughes
- 1987 – Andre Moore
- 2018 – Clayton Custer
- 2019 – Marques Townes
- 2021 – Cameron Krutwig

MCC/Horizon League/Missouri Valley First Team

- 1981 – Darius Clemons
- 1981, 1982 – Wayne Sappleton
- 1983, 1984, 1985 – Alfredrick Hughes
- 1984, 1986 – Carl Golston
- 1985 – Andre Battle
- 1986, 1987 – Andre Moore
- 1987 – Bernard Jackson
- 1988 – Gerald Hayward
- 1990, 1991 – Keith Gailes
- 1992 – Keir Rogers
- 1998, 1999 – Javan Goodman
- 2001, 2002 –
- 2004 – Paul McMillan
- 2005, 2006, 2007 – Blake Schilb
- 2017 – Milton Doyle
- 2018 – Clayton Custer
- 2019 – Marques Townes
- 2019, 2020, 2021 – Cameron Krutwig

MCC/Horizon League/Missouri Valley Second Team

- 1980, 1982 – Darius Clemons
- 1983 – Andre Battle
- 1985 – Carl Golston
- 1985 – Andre Moore
- 1988 – Kenny Miller
- 1989 – Keith Gailes
- 1994 – Vernell Brent
- 1996, 1997 – Derek Molis
- 2000 – Earl Brown
- 2003 – David Bailey
- 2012, 2013 – Ben Averkamp
- 2018 – Donte Ingram
- 2021 – Lucas Williamson

Missouri Valley Conference Third Team

- 2017 – Donte Ingram
- 2018 – Cameron Krutwig
- 2019 – Clayton Custer
- 2020 – Tate Hall
- 2021 – Aher Uguak

MCC/Horizon League/Missouri Valley All-Defensive Team

- 1998, 2000 – Earl Brown
- 2004 – Demetrius Williams
- 2006, 2007 – Majak Kou
- 2018 – Ben Richardson
- 2020 – Lucas Williamson
- 2021 – Aher Uguak
- 2021 – Lucas Williamson

MCC/Horizon League/Missouri Valley Newcomer of the Year

- 1984 – Carl Golston
- 1986 – Bernard Jackson
- 1988 – Kenny Miller
- 1989 – Keith Gailes
- 2003 – Paul McMillan
- 2014 – Milton Doyle

MCC/Horizon League/Missouri Valley All-Newcomer Team

- 1988 – Kenny Miller
- 1993 – Vernell Brent
- 1996 – Derek Molis
- 1999 – Chris Williams
- 2003 – Paul McMillan
- 2003 – Demetrius Williams
- 2006 – Leon Young
- 2014 – Milton Doyle
- 2017 – Aundre Jackson
- 2018 – Cameron Krutwig
- 2020 – Tate Hall
- 2021 – Braden Norris

Missouri Valley Freshman of the Year

- 2014 – Milton Doyle
- 2018 – Cameron Krutwig

Missouri Valley All-Freshman Team

- 2014 – Milton Doyle
- 2018 – Cameron Krutwig
- 2018 – Lucas Williamson
- 2019 – Cooper Kaifes
- 2020 – Marquise Kennedy

Missouri Valley Sixth Man of the Year

- 2017 – Aundre Jackson

Missouri Valley Defensive MVP

- 2018 – Ben Richardson
- 2021 – Lucas Williamson

MCC/Horizon League/Missouri Valley Tournament MVP

- 1983, 1985 – Alfredrick Hughes
- 2018 – Donte Ingram
- 2021 – Cameron Krutwig

MCC/Horizon League/Missouri Valley All-Tournament Team

- 1980, 1982 – Darius Clemons
- 1982 – Wayne Sappleton
- 1983, 1985 – Alfredrick Hughes
- 1984, 1985 – Carl Golston
- 1985 – Andre Battle
- 1986 – Carl Golston
- 1987 – Bernard Jackson
- 1987 – Andre Moore
- 1989, 1990, 1991 – Keith Gailes
- 1992 – Keir Rogers
- 2002 – David Bailey
- 2002 – Ryan Blankson
- 2005, 2007 – Blake Schilb
- 2018 – Donte Ingram, Ben Richardson, Marques Townes
- 2021 – Cameron Krutwig, Braden Norris

== Ramblers in the NBA draft ==
| Year | Player | Team | Round |
|---|---|---|---|
| 1949 | Jack Kerris | Chicago | Second |
| 1952 | Nick Kladis | Philadelphia | Third |
| 1962 | Jerry Harkness | Syracuse | Eighth |
| 1963 | Jerry Harkness | New York | Second |
| 1964 | Les Hunter | Detroit | Second |
| 1964 | Vic Rouse | Cincinnati | Seventh |
| 1964 | Ron Miller | Baltimore | Seventh |
| 1966 | Billy Smith | Cincinnati | Ninth |
| 1968 | Jim Tillman | Chicago | Fifth |
| 1968 | Corky Bell | Chicago | Ninth |
| 1970 | Wade Fuller | Cincinnati | Fourth |
| 1970 | Walter Robertson | Cleveland | Eighth |
| 1972 | LaRue Martin | Portland | First |
| 1976 | Ralph Vallot | Washington | Seventh |
| 1978 | Andre Wakefield | Phoenix | Fifth |
| 1979 | Larry Knight | Utah | First |
| 1980 | LeRoy Stampley | Phoenix | Fourth |
| 1981 | Kevin Sprewer | Utah | Sixth |
| 1982 | Wayne Sappleton | Golden State | Second |
| 1982 | Darius Clemons | San Diego | Fourth |
| 1985 | Alfredrick Hughes | San Antonio | First |
| 1985 | Andre Battle | Boston | Third |
| 1987 | Andre Moore | Denver | Second |
| 1987 | Bernard Jackson | Portland | Sixth |

== Ramblers players in the NBA/ABA ==
- Wilbert Kautz (1947)
- Mickey Rottner (1947–1948)
- Jack Dwan (1949)
- Mike Novak (1949–1950)
- Jerry Nagel (1950)
- Jack Kerris (1950–1953)
- Don Hanrahan (1953)
- Ed Earle (1954)
- Jerry Harkness (1964–1969)
- Les Hunter (1965–1973)
- LaRue Martin (1973–1976)
- Andre Wakefield (1979–1980)
- Wayne Sappleton (1985)
- Alfredrick Hughes (1986)
- Andre Moore (1988)
- Milton Doyle (2017–2018)
- Lucas Williamson (2026-)
