= 1962–63 Mississippi State Bulldogs men's basketball team =

American college basketball season

1962–63 Mississippi State Bulldogs men's basketball

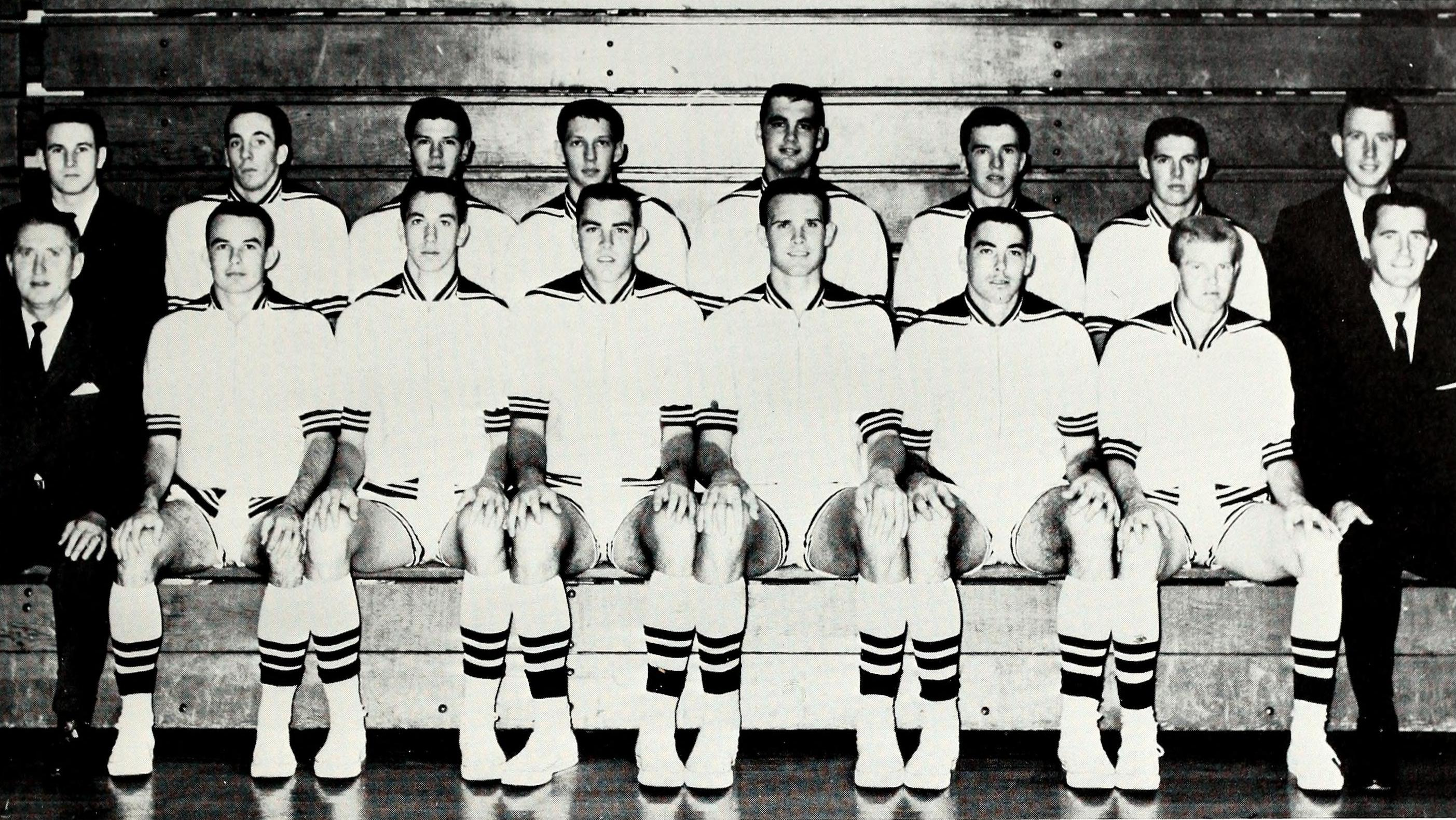

Southeastern Conference Champions

NCAA tournament, Mideast 3rd Place
- Conference: Southeastern Conference

Ranking
- Coaches: No. 7
- AP: No. 6
- Record: 22–6 (12–2 SEC)
- Head coach: Babe McCarthy (8th season)
- Home arena: McCarthy Gymnasium

The 1962–63 Mississippi State Bulldogs men's basketball team represented Mississippi State University in the 1962–63 NCAA University Division men's basketball season. Led by head coach Babe McCarthy, the Bulldogs finished with a 22–6 record (12–2 SEC) and received an invitation to the NCAA tournament in the Mideast region.

Mississippi State secured the SEC title outright with a win over Ole Miss on March 2. At that time, the SEC did not hold a postseason tournament, so the only conference title went to the regular season champion.

Having long followed an unwritten rule that teams from Mississippi would never play integrated teams with black players, the Bulldogs had declined all NCAA Tournament invitations prior to 1963. In 1963, however, university president Dean W. Colvard decided to take a risk and accept the tournament invitation. On March 2, 1963, Colvard issued a statement announcing that he would be sending the team to the tournament "unless hindered by competent authority." The decision faced challenges from the state college board and segregationists throughout the South, but ultimately the Mississippi State team was able to depart the state to play in Michigan. In what is now called the "Game of Change", the Bulldogs faced a majority-black Loyola-Chicago team in the Mideast regional semifinal. They lost 61–51, but won a consolation game against Bowling Green the following day to finish in 3rd place for the Mideast region.
