= Innovation Center =

Innovation Center may refer to:

== United States ==
- Agriculture Innovation Center
- Cambridge Innovation Center
- Energy Innovation Center
- Entrepreneurship and Innovation Center
- Entrepreneurship and Technology Innovation Center
- Innovation Center station
- Meta-Research Innovation Center at Stanford
- Oregon Manufacturing Innovation Center
- Samsung Strategy and Innovation Center
- Science and Technology Education Innovation Center

== Europe ==
- Business Innovation Center of Croatia, Croatia
- South Moravian Innovation Centre, Czech Republic
- Innovation Centre Denmark, Denmark
- Innovation Center for Artificial Intelligence, Netherlands
- Skolkovo Innovation Center, Russia
- Kroto Innovation Centre, United Kingdom
- Low Carbon Innovation Centre, United Kingdom
- National Automotive Innovation Centre, United Kingdom
- Scottish Aquaculture Innovation Centre, United Kingdom
- St John's Innovation Centre, United Kingdom
- Vaccines Manufacturing and Innovation Centre, United Kingdom

== Other ==
- Microsoft Innovation Center, worldwide
- Australian Transformation and Innovation Centre, Australia
- District 3 Innovation Centre, Canada
- Ghana Climate Innovation Centre, Ghana
- Cluster Innovation Centre, India
- National Innovation Center, Nepal
