= ATIC =

ATIC may refer to:

- ATIC Records
- Air Technical Intelligence Center, a former incarnation (1951–1961) of the current American National Air and Space Intelligence Center
- ATIC, a gene which codes inosine monophosphate synthase
- Advanced Thin Ionization Calorimeter, a balloon-borne experiment to detect cosmic rays
- Advanced Technical Intelligence Center, an educational institution focusing on technical intelligence
- Atic Atac, a video game for the ZX Spectrum
- Advanced Technology Investment Company, an investment company owned by Mubadala Investment Company
- Australian Transformation and Innovation Centre, a computer laboratory run by Thales Australia

== See also ==
- Attic (disambiguation)
- Edin Atić, Bosnian basketball player
