= Oregon Institute of Technology, Portland-Metro =

Public university in Wilsonville, Oregon, US

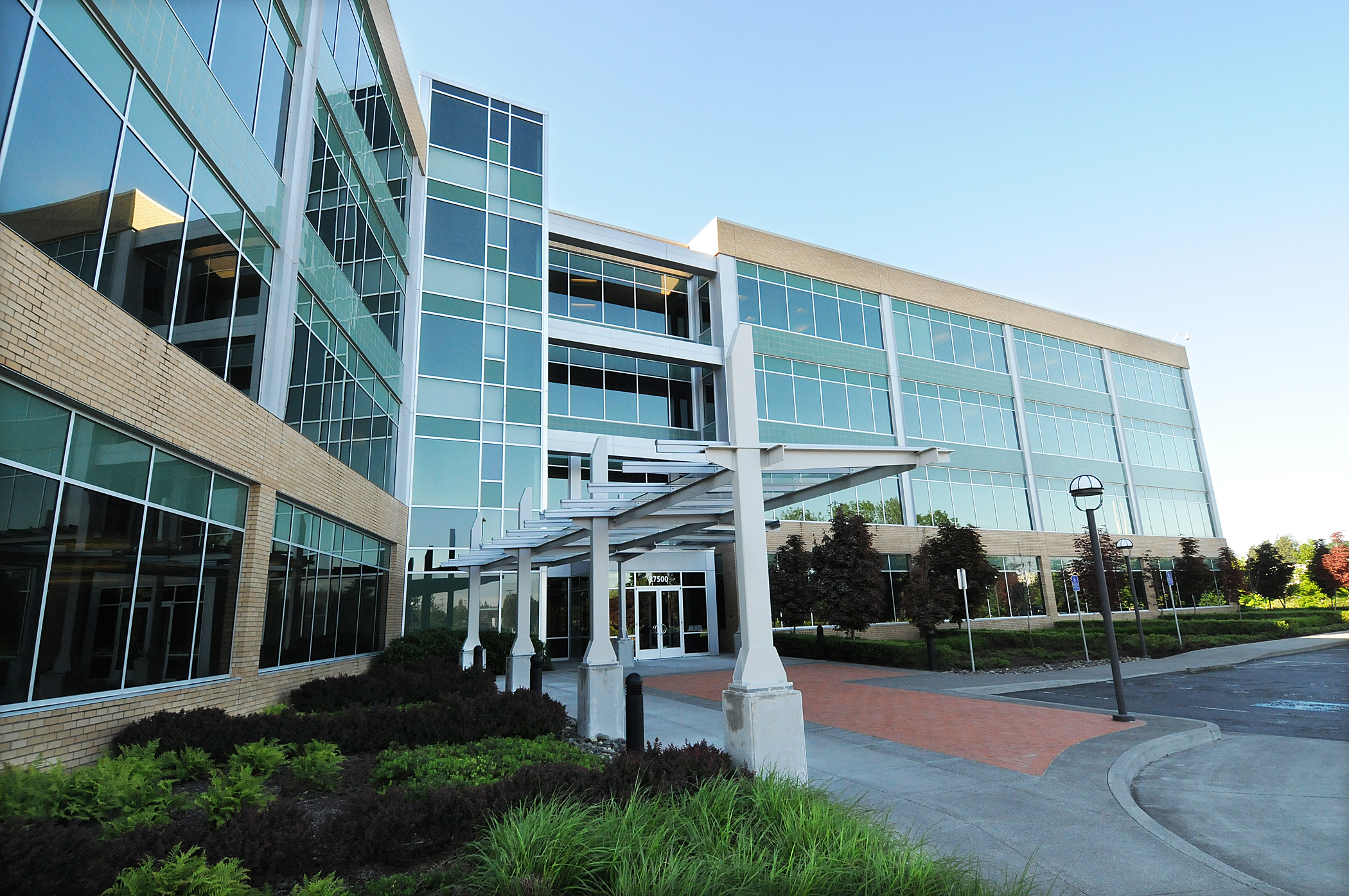
- Motto: Per cognitionem, lux (Latin)
- Motto in English: Through knowledge, light
- Type: Public college
- Established: July 22, 2012
- Endowment: $6.20 million (2015)
- Faculty: 28 professional faculty
- Students: 844 (Fall 2019)
- Undergraduates: 688 (Fall 2018)
- Postgraduates: 46 (Fall 2018)
- Location: Wilsonville, Oregon, U.S. 45.321°N 122.766°W
- Campus: Urban Total 2.2 acres (0.89 ha) Core Campus 2 acres (0.81 ha)
- Colors: Blue & Gold
- Mascot: Hootie the Owl
- Website: www.oit.edu/portland-metro
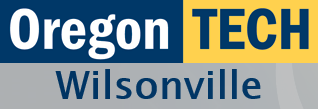

The Oregon Institute of Technology, Portland-Metro or Oregon Tech Portland-Metro, previously Oregon Tech Wilsonville, is a campus in Wilsonville, Oregon of the Oregon Institute of Technology, a public college in Oregon. It offers bachelor's and master's degrees in the fields of Clinical Laboratory Science and Paramedic Science in partnership with OHSU, and engineering, technology and management degrees in electrical and renewable energy engineering, electronics, embedded systems, manufacturing, mechanical, software engineering, computer science, information technology, operations management, and geomatics. Oregon Tech is also affiliated with the Oregon Manufacturing Innovation Center in Scappoose, Oregon.

== History ==
Oregon Tech's four locations in the Portland metropolitan area were consolidated into a single campus in 2012 at InFocus' former headquarters in Wilsonville following a rebranding campaign launched in the same year. The Oregon Tech Portland-Metro campus was officially operational in 2012. The last major renovations at this campus were complete in June, 2015. This included the addition of four new offices for staff on the second floor of the campus and the renovation of a classroom on the fourth floor. Minor improvements to individual classes and the usability of space and resources was still in process until early 2016 when resources to all departments had been allocated.

The original In-Focus building began construction in 1999 and was completed in 2001. After purchasing the building from In-Focus in 2008, Oregon Tech planned to keep much of the original "modern" design and architecture. The Portland-Metro campus currently occupies the first, second and fourth floors of the building, while Rockwell Collins, an Iowa-based aviation-electronics company, occupies the third floor.

Plans for expansion of the Klamath Falls campus were discussed in 2007 and 2008 to merge the Portland area sites, allow for a threefold increase in the number of students it serves and spur the creation of new degrees in specialized scientific and technical fields.

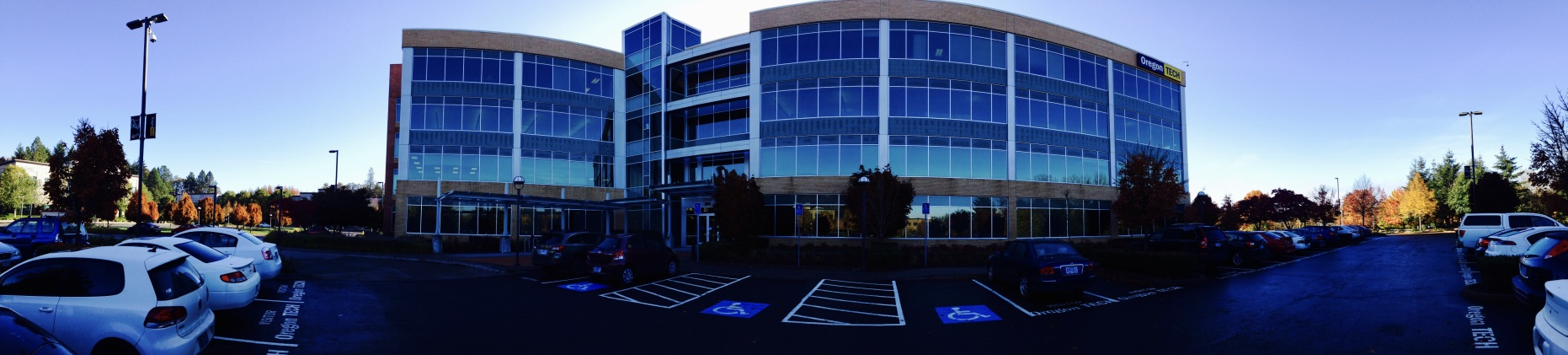
Wide angle lens of OT Wilsonville (2016)

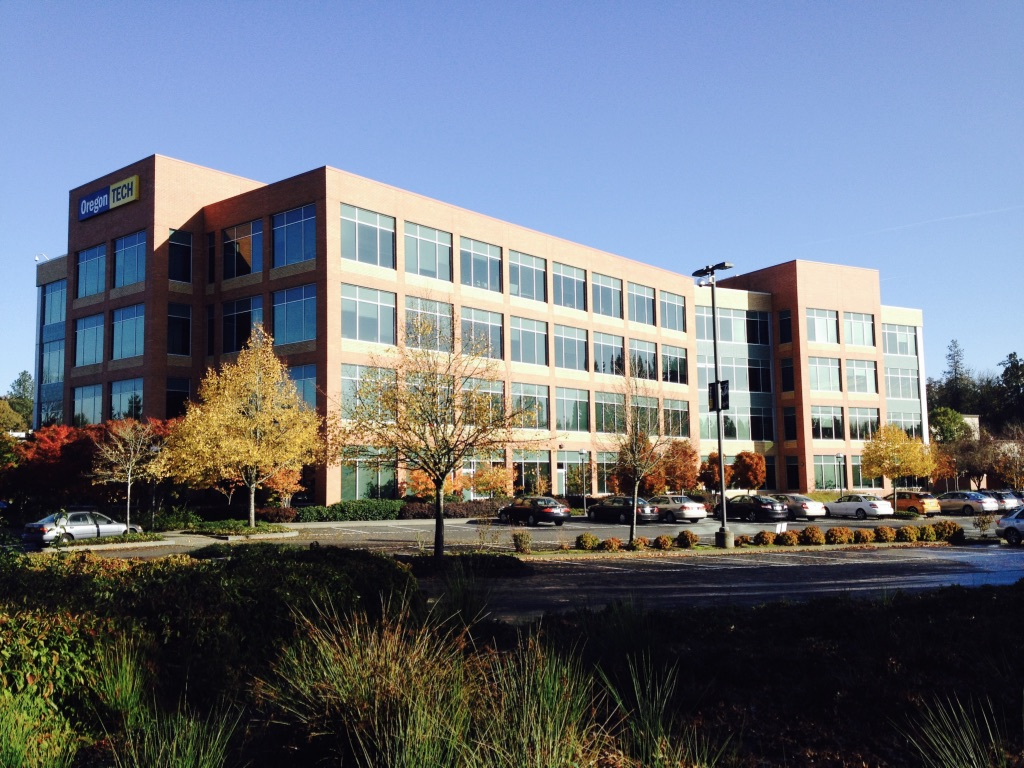
Wilsonville (Fall 2016)

Oregon lawmakers approved using $20 million in lottery-backed bonds to cover two-thirds of the building's cost, $20.6 million to purchase the structure and $9.4 million for renovations and related costs.

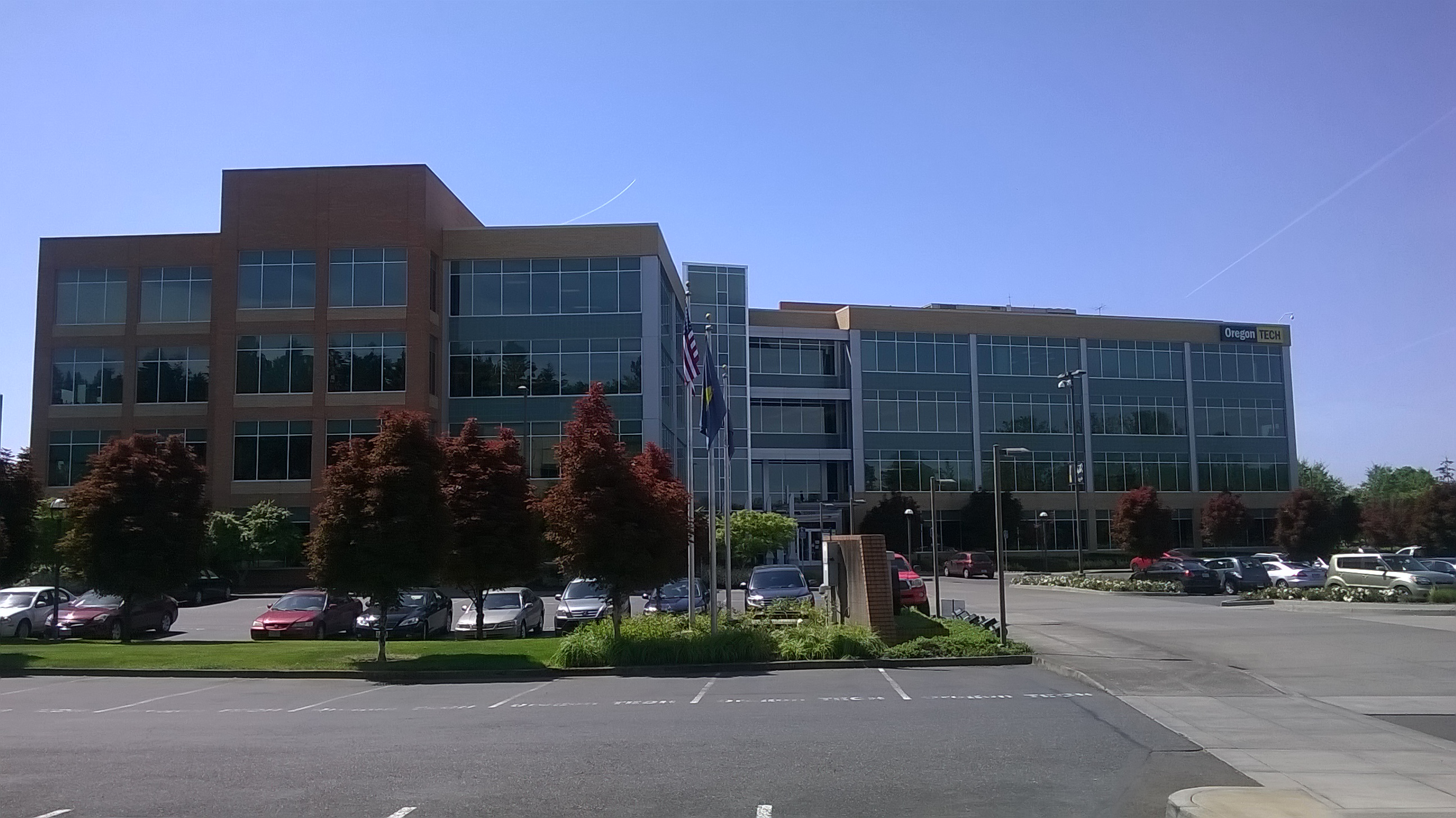
Wilsonville (Summer 2015)

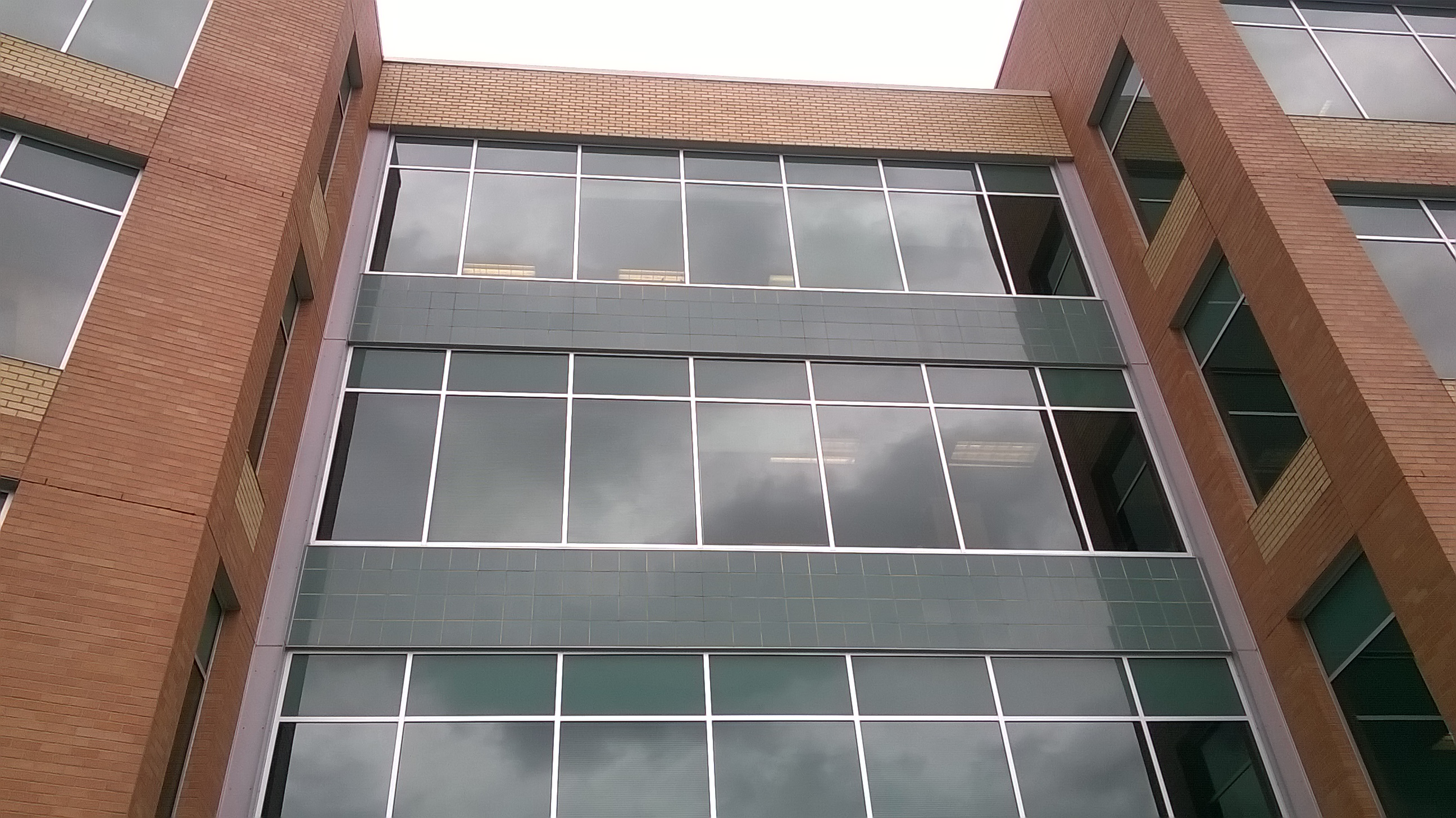
Multicolored brick architecture with blue accented windows mirror the original InFocus building design on the South side of the Oregon Tech Wilsonville building

While offering many of the same programs that the Klamath campus has, there are two signature programs at this campus: medical lab sciences, in partnership with the Oregon Health and Science University, and renewable energy engineering. Current enrollment at this campus is about 750 to 1,000 students per term. Many undergraduate students typically intern and work professionally while working towards a degree.

=== End of the OUS (Oregon University System) ===
Portland State University, Oregon Tech and Oregon State University were the last holdouts of the Oregon University System before its legal abolishment in July 2015. The decision left Oregon state universities to be run by their own independent governing boards, such as Oregon Tech Klamath Falls which now governs all Oregon Tech campuses under an independent board. All records from the OUS have been transferred to the Oregon Higher Education Coordinating Commission (HECC), which has more limited powers than OUS did.

== Organization and administration ==
Oregon Tech Portland-Metro is a public college governed by 13 publicly appointed board of trustees at the Klamath Falls campus. It is still under the umbrella of the Oregon Tech oversight and is allotted separate funding from Klamath Falls.

== Campus life ==
Oregon Tech Portland-Metro is situated around several technology companies which periodically enroll employees into the universities' student body as well as pool new graduates. Students typically purchase food from a micro market in the Student Commons or walk to either Argyle square or the Wilsonville city center.

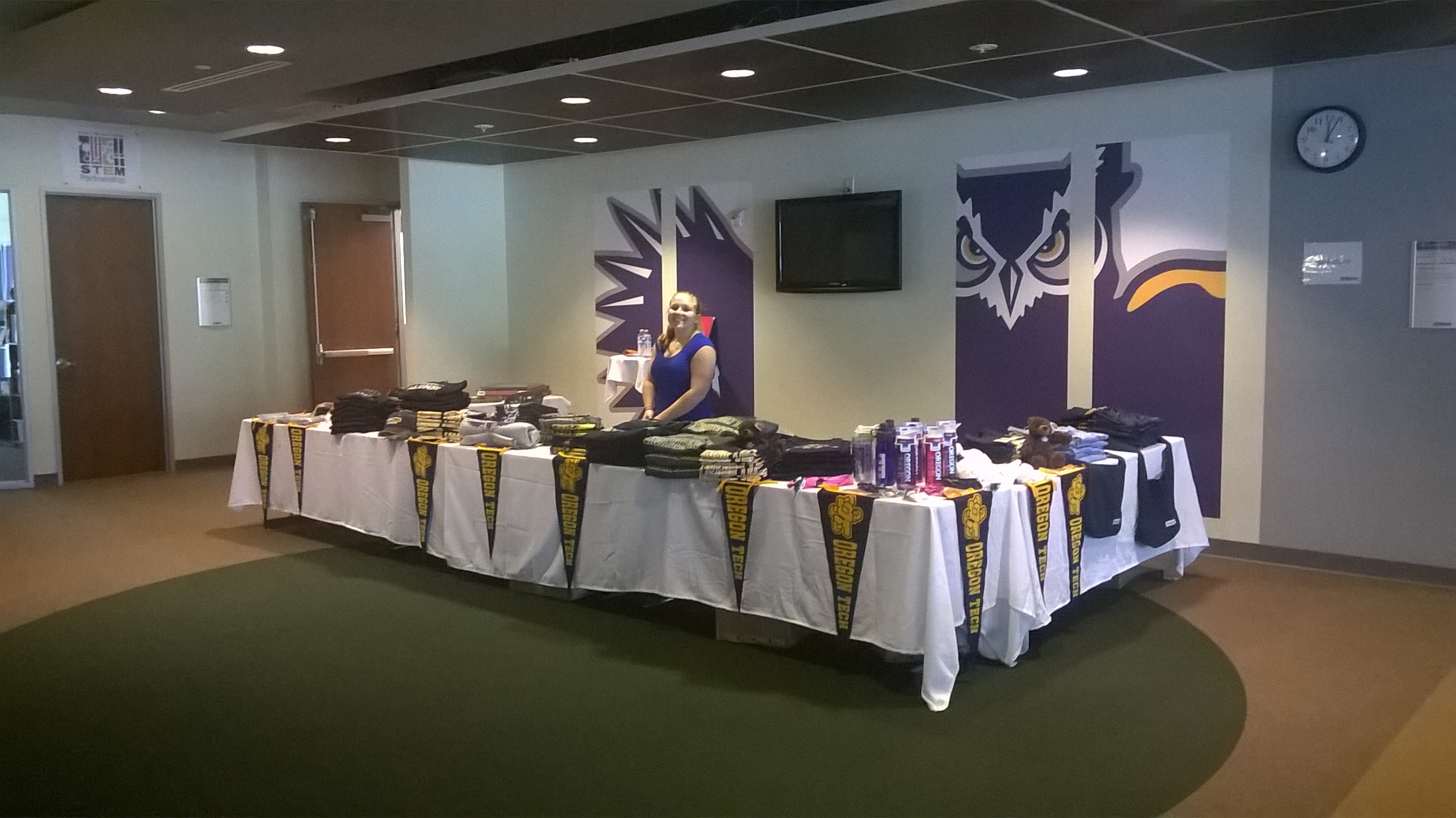
Second floor bookstore

=== Library ===
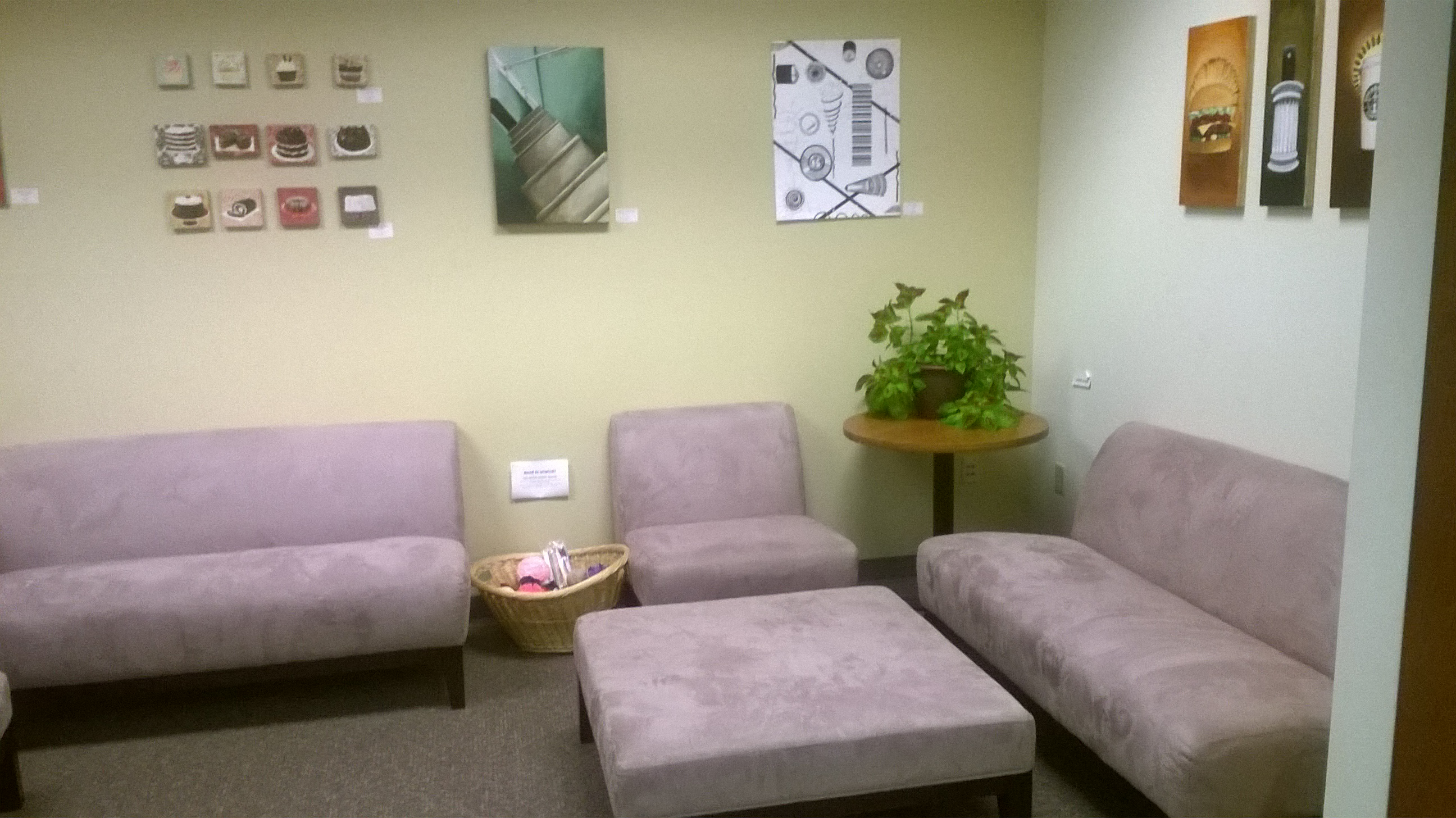
Fourth floor "Library Lounge Nest"

The campus has a library located on the fourth floor. The library houses approximately 1200 volumes and has access to all electronic resources to which the institution subscribes. Students may also check out items through Summit from more than 37 different university library campuses in the Pacific Northwest. The library has seven rooms that students can check out for studying or for group collaboration and functions as the hub for many school and industry related projects around campus.

=== Tutoring ===
Oregon Tech has a free and open tutoring service for students dubbed "Peer Consulting" which is located on the fourth floor, opposite of the campus library. The objective of the center is to have students who have a 'B' or higher in their classes assist their peers by providing direction in their study or work. The Peer Consulting center is unique because it attempts to de-stigmatize academic assistance, provide a space for students to ask questions and connect with their peers.

=== Intel workstation donation ===
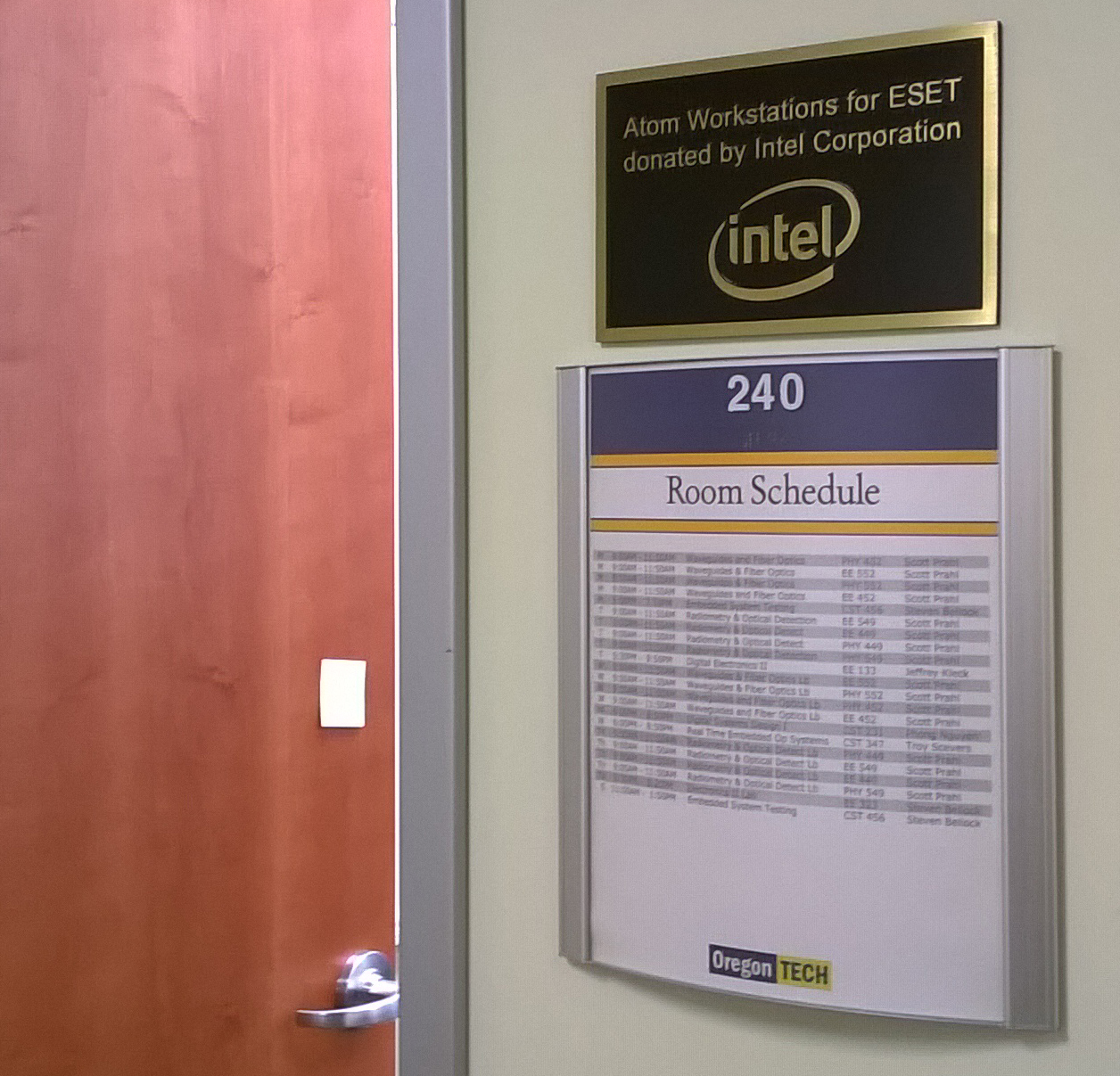
Intel dedication plaque (2014)

Intel donated the workstation computers on the fourth floor of the campus and an Atom workstation in 2012 for ESET students.

=== Student Life Traditions ===
==== Annual Events ====
===== Healthy Active Challenge =====
The Healthy Active Challenge provide a fun and competitive way for students to meet their own personal nutrition, fitness and lifestyle goals in an effort to enhance their overall well-being. The event runs during the spring term and features health presentations, weekly prizes and an end of competition party.

===== Student Project Symposium =====
This official event at the Portland-Metro campus allows students to showcase the projects that they conduct during their studies. The event is held annually towards the end of Spring term, and it provides an opportunity for students from different programs to share their work, as well as get to see other projects.

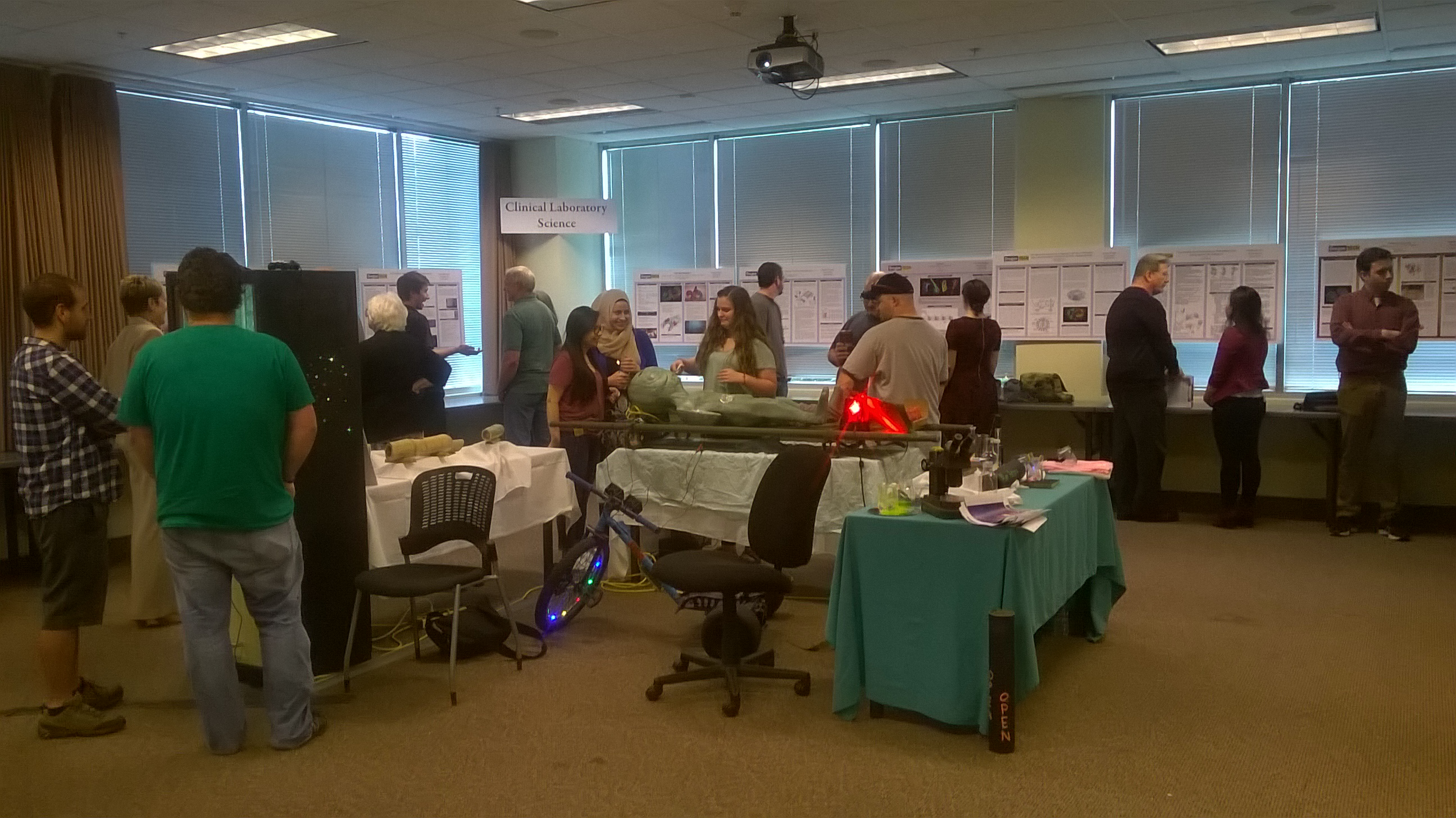
The CLS and Group Communication projects at the 2016 Symposium in the West Wing Lecture Hall.

The Symposium includes project posters, demonstrations, and oral presentations and typically lasts two hours long. Students, faculty, family members, employers, educational and industry partners, as well as members of the public typically attend each year.

==== Pranks ====
Around 2013, after Oregon Tech purchased the old Wilsonville building from InFocus, rumors of the institution's plans to convert it into a "flagship tech-focused" campus spread among the staff. A picture of a duck pushing an owl out from a building, presumed to be the Wilsonville Campus, was found in the student commons and later removed.

===== Rivalry with Caltech =====
Since around mid-2012, there has been rivalry between Oregon Tech and Caltech after Oregon Tech rebranded from its stylized OIT logo and focused on being the number one institute of technology on the West Coast.

On September 18, 2014, students handed out shirts in the first floor commons to freshmen that had "Caltack on Titan" on the front and the image of Caltech's beaver mascot running in fear, while Oregon's Hootie the owl mascot plays an electric guitar.

On December 10, 2015, a cardboard cut-out of the Big Bang theory's Sheldon Cooper with thumbs-up and a speech-bubble that said, "Oregon Tech. It's above California Tech. That's why I moved!", placed in the stairway leading to Rockwell Collins, presumably a pun on the recently aired Oregon State Lottery commercial "All things Oregon."

== ASOIT ==
Associated Students of Oregon Institute of Technology (ASOIT) is the student government on campus. ASOIT helps coordinate programs, clubs and events to enhance the quality of life for students and promote community on campus.

=== Active Clubs ===
The following are clubs that maintain an active presence on campus and are a registered club in accordance with ASIOT (Associated Students of Oregon Tech).

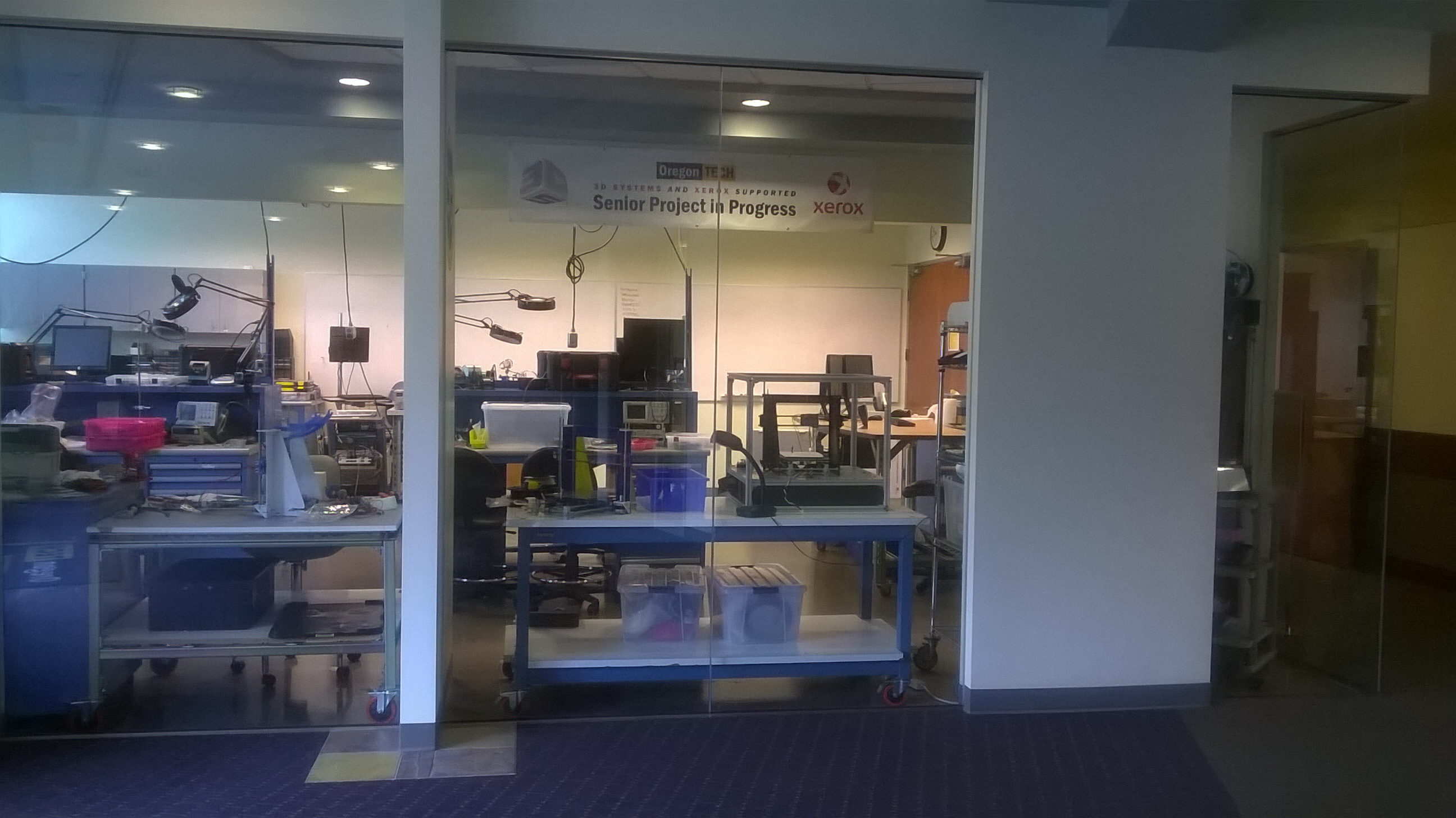
OT Wilsonville Rapid Prototyping Room

==== 3D Print Club ====
Oregon Tech Wilsonville has a 3D print club which actively aids student projects and other clubs. Since its founding in early 2014, the 3D print club supports all students' projects; however, students are required to provide materials if it is not for a class.

==== IEEE Oregon Tech Wilsonville ====
This club is part of the Oregon Institute of Technology Portland-Metro Student Branch of the Institute of Electrical and Electronics Engineers.

==== Hyperion International ====
The Hyperion International club works with the Foundation "Solar HOPE" (non-profit) dedicated to providing renewable energy solutions to underdeveloped regions of the world. Named after the Titan god of light and traveling internationally, the club installs solar systems at schools, hospitals, and orphanages where there is little or no electricity. This brings opportunities for lights, water pumping, phone/computer charging, vaccination refrigeration and more.

==== Tech Owls in Action ====
The purpose of TOA is to bring together students with interest in clean energy to provide development in leadership, professional, and project planning abilities, access to clean energy information, at least one clean energy event on campus, and to ultimately exercise teamwork to implement student led solutions that benefit the Wilsonville community.

==== Gravity and Space (GRASP) ====
GRASP Research is an organization that facilitates and conducts space experiments. It brings students and faculty of diverse backgrounds together to carry out various hands-on aerospace projects. As of March 2016, Oregon Tech Wilsonville has started partnering with SpaceX to test new designs and projects.

==== Other Clubs ====
- Technologists in Training
- Graduate Student Organization
- OWL Veterans Organization
- International Energy Club
- Inventors Club
- Outdoor Club

== Academics ==
In their 2020 report U.S. News & World Report considers Oregon Tech to be the #6 Public College in the regional West part of the United States. Forbes in 2019 rated Oregon Tech #423 in Top Colleges, #143 in public colleges, #82 among all West Coast universities and #217 in best value colleges considers it to be "innovative" and "very competitive."

The Wilsonville Oregon Tech campus was officially operational in 2012 and is located on Parkway Avenue in the remodeled InFocus building. The last major renovations at this campus were complete in winter 2019–20 with the addition of new offices for staff on the fourth floor of the campus and the renovation of the student Commons to create additional recreational space for students. The Wilsonville campus currently occupies the first, second and fourth floors of the building, while Rockwell Collins, an Iowa-based aviation-electronics company, occupies the third floor.

Engineering degrees at the institution are accredited by the Engineering Accreditation Commission of ABET.

Oregon Tech graduates success rate is 97.5% graduate success, which is defined as being employed or continuing an educational path, within six months of receiving a degree and the average starting salary for an Oregon Tech graduate is $60,000 per year."

=== Institution Philosophies ===
Oregon Tech Portland-Metro claims to have a student-to-faculty ratio of approximately 14:1, allowing the staff to have a personal connection with the student as they make an individual progression towards a degree. The Portland-Metro campus has a focus on a hands-on learning style, "... guided by a willingness to try, fail, learn, and try again, is one that encourages students to dream big and set high standards with measurable goals for themselves."

The institution is noted as having the highest return on investment (ROI) of any college or university in Oregon according to the 2019 April Payscale report.

== Access to Campus ==
=== Transportation and housing ===
The Portland-Metro campus does not offer housing since many students live in surrounding cities such as Clackamas, Portland, Wilsonville, Tigard and Tualatin. Oregon Tech students can ride the S.M.A.R.T. (South Metro Area Transit) buses in Wilsonville to and from campus for free with a valid student ID.
