= 2021 Oregon Tech strike =

2021 American university faculty strike

- Date: April 26 – May 4, 2021 (1 week and 1 day)
- Location: Klamath Falls, Oregon, United States; Wilsonville, Oregon, United States
- Caused by: Disagreements over labor contract between university and union
- Goals: Decreased workload; Increased pay
- Methods: Picketing; Strike action
- Result: Union ratifies labor contract including wage increases and codified work environment protections

Parties
Oregon Tech - American Association of University Professors	Oregon Institute of Technology

The 2021 Oregon Tech strike was a labor strike involving faculty members from the Oregon Institute of Technology. The strike was organized by the Oregon Tech - American Association of University Professors (OT-AAUP), a local union representing the faculty members that had been formed in 2018 and was recognized by the university in 2019. Following its recognition, the union and university entered into contract negotiations for the faculty members' first labor contract. However, negotiations proceeded slowly, and by early 2021, an agreement had not been reached. On March 17, both sides presented their final offers and the following month, union members voted to authorize strike action. On April 26, following a round of last-minute negotiations, the union officially commenced strike action.

At the start of the strike, faculty members began picketing outside of the university's campuses in Klamath Falls and Wilsonville. Some classes were affected by the strike, while the university brought in temporary replacement workers to cover for some of the striking workers. Negotiations began several days after the strike started, and on May 4, a tentative agreement was reached that saw the faculty members return to work, with ratification voting occurring over the next few days. The five-year contract included provisions for pay increases and codified certain provisions for work environment and workload for the faculty.

== Background ==
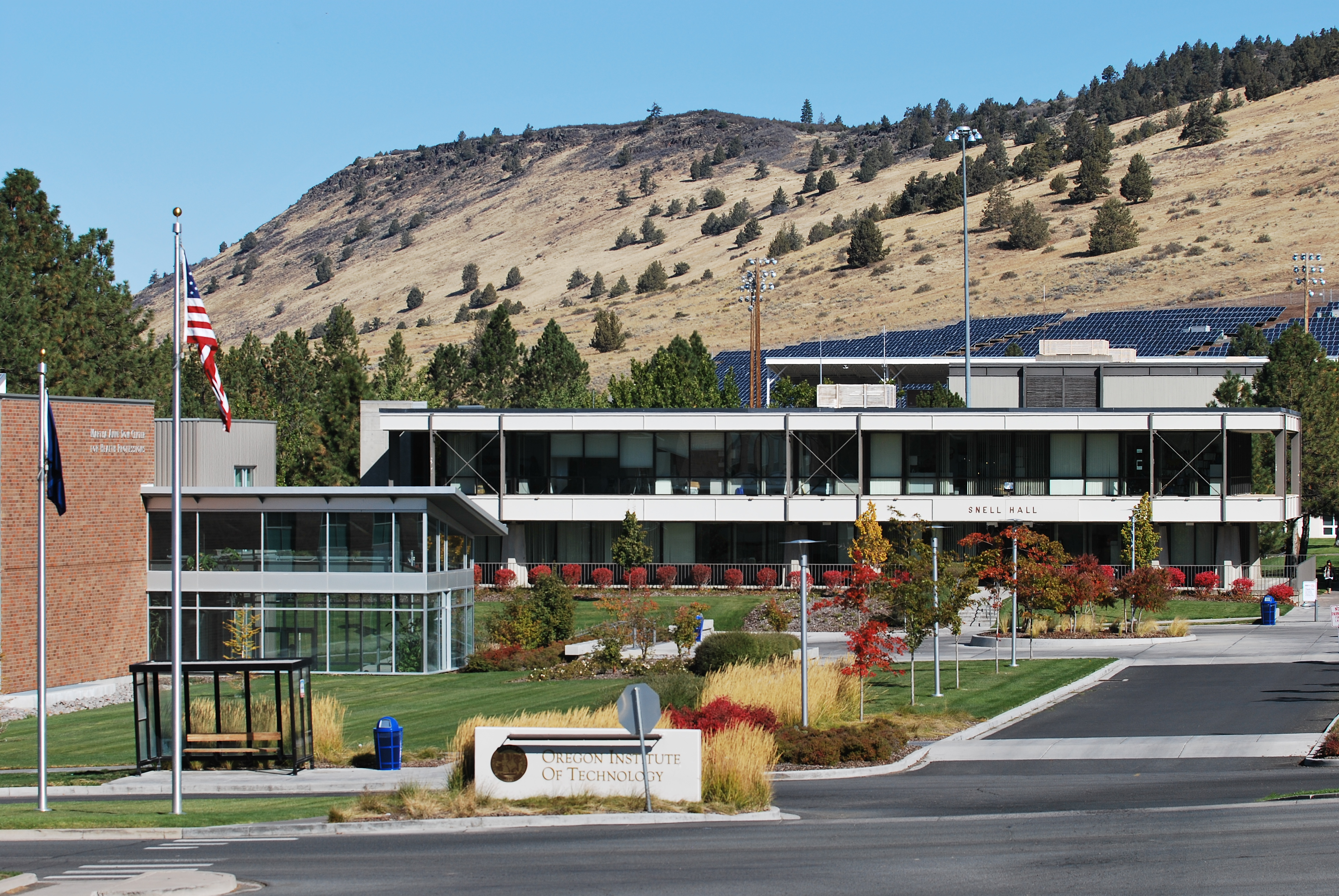
Oregon Tech's campus in Klamath Falls, 2014

The Oregon Institute of Technology (Oregon Tech) is a public institute of technology with campuses in Klamath Falls and Wilsonville, Oregon. In late 2019, the university entered into negotiations with the Oregon Tech - American Association of University Professors (OT-AAUP), the local union representing faculty members at Oregon Tech, over the terms of a labor contract. The union had been formed in 2018 and was recognized by the university in 2019. However, by early 2021, after roughly 16 months of negotiating (with the last 6 months including mediation), the two sides were at an impasse, with workloads and pay being the main points of contention. On March 17, both sides presented their final offers, which was followed by a 30-day cool down period where both sides continued negotiations. Following this period, Oregon Tech was allowed to implement their offer and the union was allowed to pursue strike action. According to the university, the union was seeking a 20 percent wage increase and a 20 percent reduction in workload, which they said would amount to a $9 million increase in cost over three years. The university rejected this proposal and submitted their own, which, according to the university, would have included "proposed retroactive pay increases as well as merit-based increases". With no agreement reached, the union held a vote for strike authorization, which would allow the union to call for a strike if a settlement between the union and university was not reached. By April 2, the union stated that 96 percent of their members had voted, with 92 percent voting in favor of strike authorization. The two sides were still undergoing negotiations at the time of the vote, with their last meeting occurring a day earlier. OT-AAUP President Sean St. Clair stated that, while the union did not want to strike, they would if they felt it were necessary, while Oregon Tech President Nagi Naganathan stated, "After 16 months of negotiating, Oregon Tech is disappointed that OT-AAUP has decided to focus on using this approach instead of coming to the table with a true intent to work on an agreement and reach a resolution." Around the same time, faculty dissatisfaction with President Naganathan had reached a point where, in a vote of no confidence held by the Faculty Senate, 92 percent of the faculty voted in favor of no confidence, with the results of the vote presented to the Oregon Tech Board of Trustees. One union member, in an interview with Inside Higher Ed, stated that efforts towards unionization at the university had started in 2018 following Naganathan's arrival to Oregon Tech.

On April 8, OT-AAUP gave the university their strike notice, stating that strike action would commence "no earlier than Monday, April 26". At the time, no public university in Oregon had experienced a labor strike from its faculty. Portland State University faculty had authorized strike action in 2014, but an agreement was reached before a strike was called, while in 2006, faculty at Eastern Oregon University had come close to strike action. On April 21, Oregon Tech filed a petition with the Oregon Employment Relations Board (OERB) urging them to declare the proposed strike unlawful, and additionally, the university filed an unfair labor practice charge, arguing that the university was not bargaining in good faith. Over the weekend leading up to April 26, the university and union engaged in negotiations, but again, the two sides remained at an impasse.

== Course of the strike ==
On the morning of April 26, the strike officially commenced, with faculty members picketing at the Klamath Falls and Wilsonville campuses. In addition, informational picketing occurred at the university's Dental Hygiene Clinic in Chemeketa Community College. Students were advised to attend class unless otherwise notified by school officials, and faculty tasks were carried out by part-time instructors and faculty members who chose not to participate in the strike. However, the union claimed that over 40 classes did not have teachers on the first day of the strike. Additionally, some students joined in picketing and protesting with the strikers. Picketing continued on a daily basis for the duration of the strike. In response to the strike, the university stated that they had made an offer with the faculty that would have seen a 13 percent wage increase over the duration of the proposed contract, which included a flat 9.5 percent increase and an additional 3.5 percent based on performance, but that this proposal had been rejected. OT-AAUP stated that the strike was open-ended and would continue until an agreement was reached with the university.

By April 28, the union was accusing the university of hiring an outside firm that was violating state law, though the university rejected that they had violated the state statute. The union stated that the firm, Focus EduVation, did not notify temporary workers that they were acting as strikebreakers. That same day, negotiations resumed between the two groups, but neither side was able to reach an agreement. On April 29, the OERB dismissed the university's petition to rule the strike as unlawful. The next day, the union and university met again for negotiations, this time with mediators present. These sessions continued over the next several days. On the morning of May 4, the strike was called off following a tentative agreement that had been reached between the two groups. Voting commenced among the union's members over the following days. The contract was officially ratified by union members on May 18.

== Aftermath ==
According to a union representative, the agreement between the union and university included an 11.5 percent wage increase over the course of the five-year long contract, with additional opportunities for merit-based pay increases in the latter part of the contract. This included annual pay increases of between 2 and 3 percent and a retroactive 2 percent wage increase. In addition, the contract codified the union's right to bargain and included protections against excess workloads and changes to working conditions, and the university agreed to cover between 95 and 97 percent of the faculty's health care costs. The contract also stipulated that the university could not withdraw from the benefits offered by the Public Employee Benefit Board unless it did so for all union members, which would also include members of another union at the university. The contract would be retroactive from 2020 and run until June 30, 2025.

== See also ==
- COVID-19 pandemic in Oregon
- Impact of the COVID-19 pandemic on education
- Strikes during the COVID-19 pandemic
