= Attic (disambiguation) =

An attic is an area under the roof of a house.

Attic may also refer to:

== Attica-related ==
- The adjectival form of the word Attica, a historical region that encompasses the city of Athens
- Attic Greek, a dialect of the Greek language spoken in ancient Athens
- Attic orators, ten ancient Athenian speechwriters
- Attic peninsula, another name for Attica
- Attic (architecture), a story or low wall above the cornice of a façade in classical architecture

== Other uses ==
- Attic (backup software)
- Apache Attic, a repository for Apache Software Foundation software projects that have been retired
- Attic Entertainment Software, a defunct German computer game developer and publisher
- Attic Records, a Canadian record label
- Attic (or atticus), is the epitympanic recess of the middle ear

== See also ==
- The Attic (disambiguation)
- ATIC (disambiguation)
- Attic ochre
- Attik (1885–1944), Greek composer
- Atiq, Arabic name
