= Vaccines Manufacturing and Innovation Centre =

Vaccine research and manufacturing facility in Oxfordshire, England

Coordinates: 51.7163889°N 1.2161111°W

The Vaccines Manufacturing and Innovation Centre (VMIC) is a vaccine research and manufacturing facility in Harwell Science and Innovation Campus in Oxfordshire, England.

== History ==
The construction of VMIC, the first dedicated biologics development and manufacturing facility in the UK, was announced in December 2018. Reportedly, a key event that motivated its creation was the Western African Ebola epidemic of 2014; furthermore, Britain's vaccine production capabilities had declined substantially during the 1980s and 1990s. VMIC was organised as a not-for-profit entity with the aim of combining vaccine research and manufacturing within a single facility. Several organisations collaborated in the initiative, including Imperial College London, the London School of Hygiene and Tropical Medicine, Oxford University, Johnson and Johnson, GE Healthcare, Merck Group, Vale of White Horse District Council and UK Research and Innovation (the latter being a body of the British government). At the time of this announcement, VMIC was scheduled to be opened in 2022.

In April 2020, construction of the 7,000 square metre facility in Harwell was begun by main contractor Glencar ahead of schedule as part of as part of the national response to the COVID-19 pandemic. Other companies involved in the construction process included WHP Engineering, which provided design and development services and GE Healthcare, which supplied bioprocessing expertise and training.

In May 2020, it was announced that the UK government had decided to invest £93 million into VMIC's construction and that the centre would now open in summer 2021, 12 months earlier than had originally been planned. In March 2021, an additional £47.6 million was provided to support VMIC's expansion and acceleration.

Starting in 2020, the centre's personnel contributed to development of the Oxford–AstraZeneca COVID-19 vaccine AZD1222, and began medium-scale production from October of that year. It was reported in January 2021 that VMIC would not be fully operational until 2022. Other diseases that VMIC was reportedly planning to research included influenza, Ebola, Zika and Lassa fever.

In early 2022, reports emerged that VMIC may be sold and that discussions with a potential buyer were underway. Reportedly, VMIC’s board had decided to pursue the sale of the facility shortly after the UK government's decision to not provide additional investments for fully completing VMIC. In April 2022, it was announced that the American pharmaceutical company Catalent had agreed terms to purchase the centre; these would involve the investment of up to £120 million to complete it as well as to employ 400 people on site. By early 2024, Catalent had postponed its investment plans for the centre.
