= The Attic =

The Attic may refer to:

- Attic (disambiguation)

== Film ==
- The Attic (1962 film), an Italian comedy film
- The Attic (1980 film), a horror–thriller film starring Ray Milland and Carrie Snodgress, about a young woman caring for her disabled father
- The Attic (2007 film), a horror film starring Elisabeth Moss, about a haunted attic
- The Attic: The Hiding of Anne Frank, a 1988 television film
- "The Attic" (Dollhouse), an episode of Dollhouse

== Music ==
- The Attic (band)
- The Attic (musical), a Hungarian musical
- The Attic (magazine), an online music magazine
- "The Attic", a song by Poppy from the album Zig (album)

== Other uses ==
- The Attic (restaurant), formerly in West Vancouver
- The Attic or Mansarda: satirična poema, a 1962 novel by Danilo Kiš
