= Oregon Manufacturing Innovation Center =

Building in Scappoose, Oregon, United States

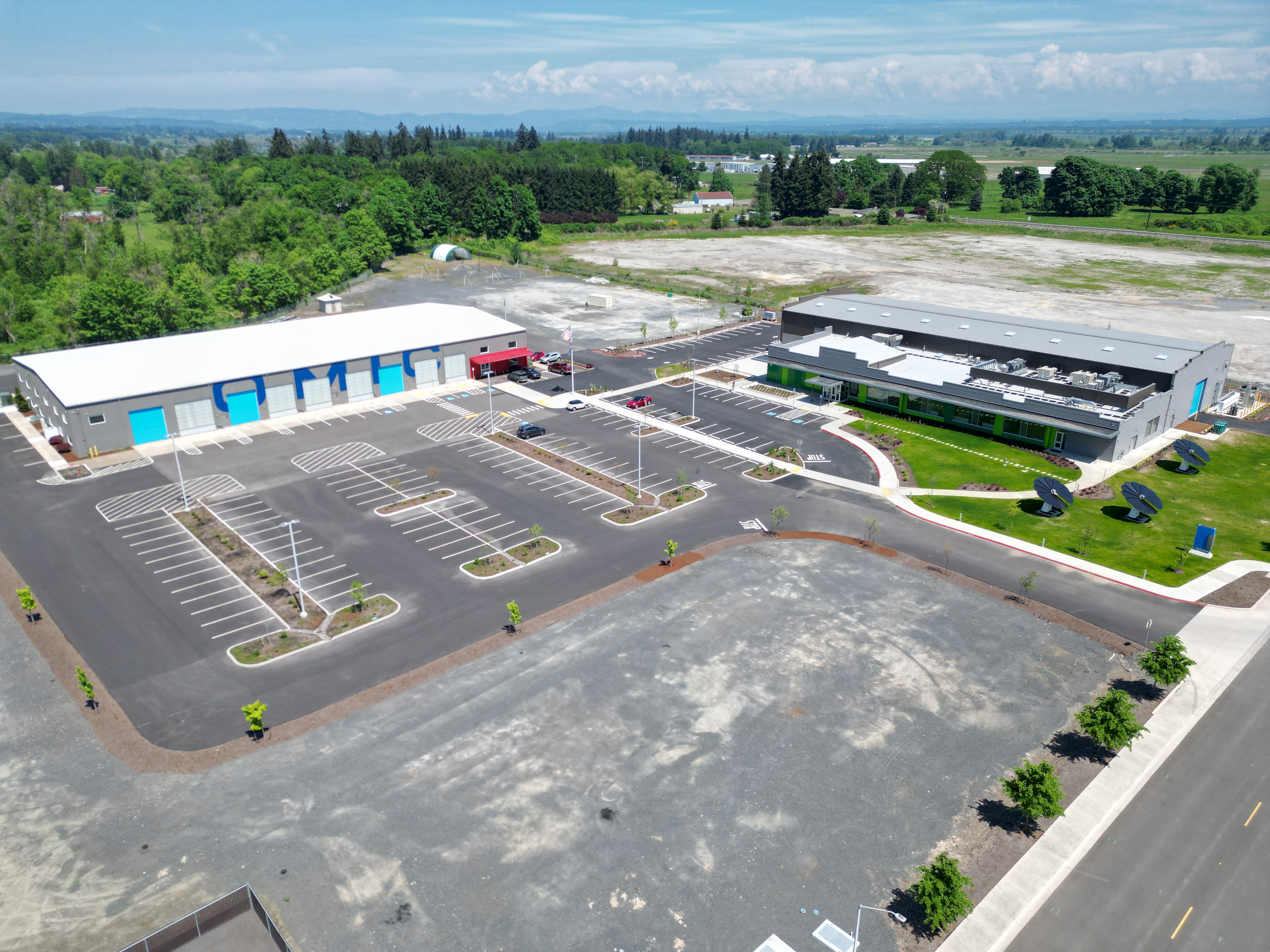
Photo of the OMIC R&D Campus, taken in May 2023. Photo includes the original and new additive building completed in Spring 2023.

The Oregon Manufacturing Innovation Center, Research & Development, abbreviated as OMIC R&D, is a research facility located in Scappoose, Oregon. OMIC R&D is a collaborative environment bringing together industry, higher education, and government in partnership to develop new tools, techniques, and technologies to address near-term manufacturing challenges through applied research and advanced technical training. OMIC R&D is modeled after the University of Sheffield Advanced Manufacturing Research Center (AMRC) with Boeing in Sheffield, England.

In 2017, the Oregon Legislature approved funding of $7.5 million to develop OMIC R&D. The facility officially launched following the signing of its initial Membership Agreement among industry and higher education partners in the second quarter of 2017. Between the 2016 and 2017 Legislative Sessions, OMIC R&D has received a total of $21.5 million in state funding.

== Organization ==
OMIC R&D is overseen by a Board of Governors made up of industry and higher education members. Operations are overseen by its host, the Oregon Institute of Technology (Oregon Tech), a public polytechnic university, which is also the building owner and landlord. OMIC R&D is managed by the executive director, Craig Campbell.

=== OMIC Research and Development Center ===
Located in Columbia County, Oregon, OMIC R&D focuses on applied research and advanced manufacturing for industrial companies. It works with manufacturers, metals manufacturing suppliers, and higher education partners. University and company researchers work with undergraduate and graduate student assistants on problem sets defined by OMIC R&D's industry members. The 33,800 sq. ft. facility was bought in part by the $2.5 million in Oregon Lottery Revenue Bonds and a $1.7 million investment by the Oregon Institute of Technology. Oregon R&D has also received capital bond and operating funds from the Oregon Legislature and a $3 million grant from Commerce's Economic Development Administration. It has recurring funding from OMIC R&D membership dues at varying rates based on each member's participation level. Members include national and international corporations, as well as three Oregon universities: Oregon Institute of Technology, Oregon State University, and Portland State University. OMIC R&D is an anchor for innovation, enhancing the competitiveness of the metals manufacturing industry by serving companies of all sizes through an industry-driven collaborative, and providing a critical mass of workforce and innovation assets in the region, creating both an R&D and training partnership for advanced manufacturing in Oregon.

== OMIC R&D Benefits ==
OMIC R&D benefits include: three to five years of industry training for college and university students and incumbent workers; the creation of new technologies through integrated applied research; and growing and strengthening Oregon's manufacturing industries. OMIC R&D has the following partners:

OMIC Partnership Table
| Industry members | Government partners and agencies | Research members | Labor and trade organizations |
|---|---|---|---|
| ATI Technologies | Oregon Legislature | Oregon Institute of Technology (Oregon Tech) | Machinists Union |
| Blount International | Business Oregon | Oregon State University (OSU) | Society of Professional Engineering Employees in Aerospace (SPEEA) |
| Boeing | Oregon Higher Education Coordinating Commission | Portland State University (PSU) | AFL–CIO |
| Caron Engineering | Oregon Employment Department | | Oregon Manufacturing Extension Partnership (OMEP) |
| CGTech Vericut | Greater Portland Inc. (GPI) | | Pacific Northwest Defense Coalition (PNDC) |
| Daimler Trucks North America | Columbia County Economic Team (CCET) | | |
| Haimer | Columbia-Pacific Economic Development District | | |
| Hangsterfer's | City of Scappoose | | |
| IMS Software Inc. | United States Department of Commerce, Economic Development Administration | | |
| Kennametal | | | |
| Mistsubishi Materials | | | |
| Portland General Electric | | | |
| OSG USA | | | |
| Sandvik Coromant | | | |
| Schaeffer Oil | | | |
| Seco Tools | | | |
| Silver Eagle Manufacturing | | | |
| Sugino Engineering | | | |
| Summit Manufacturing Inc. (SMI) | | | |
| Walter Tools | | | |
| WFL Millturn Technologies | | | |
| ZOLLER Inc. | | | |
