= Energy Innovation Center =

- Clifford B. Connelley Trade School
- U.S. National Register of Historic Places
- Pittsburgh Landmark – PHLF
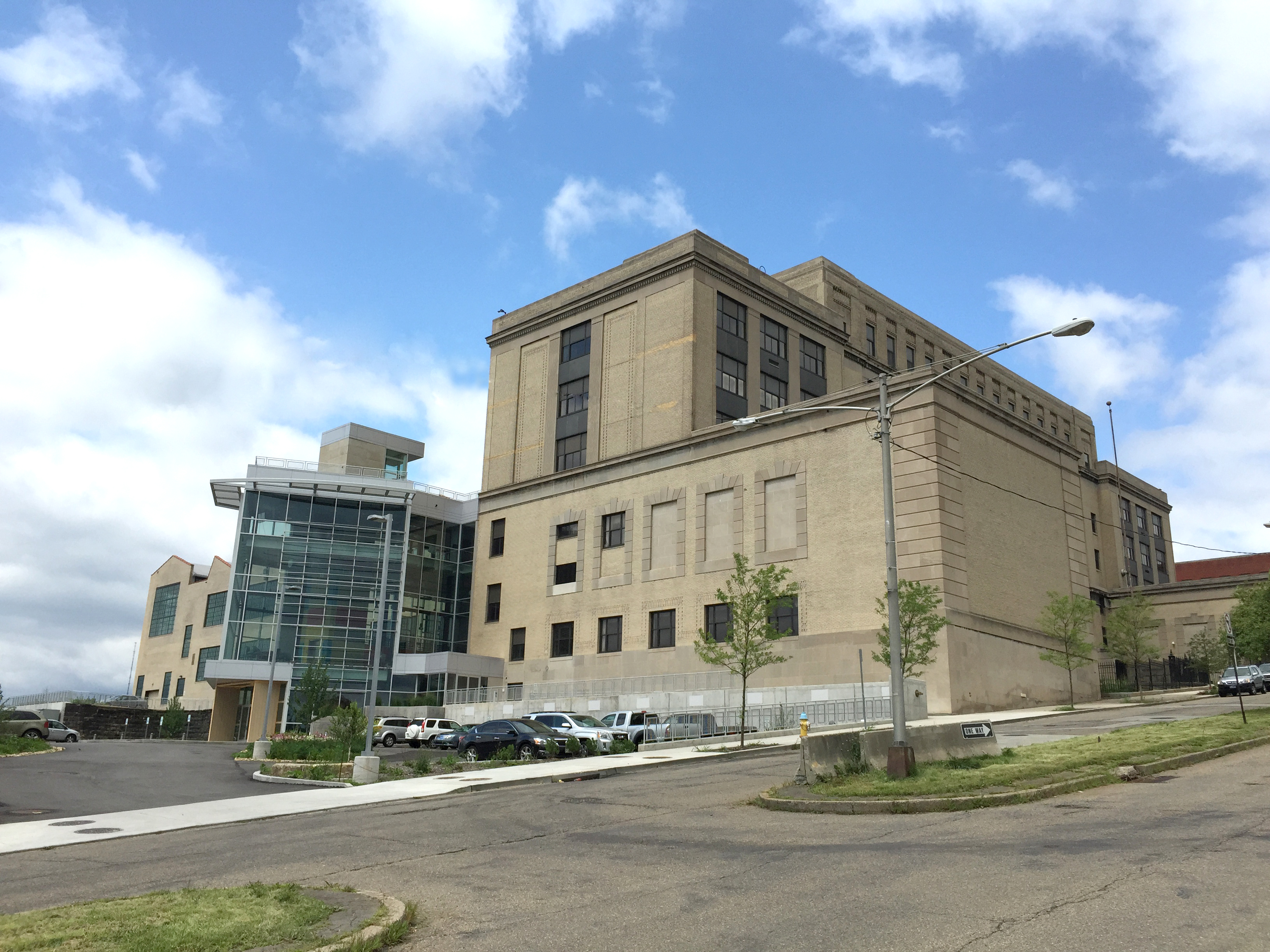

- Location within Pittsburgh Location within Pennsylvania Location within the United States
- Location: 1435 Bedford Avenue (Crawford–Roberts), Uptown Pittsburgh Pittsburgh, Pennsylvania
- Coordinates: 40°26′39.28″N 79°59′19.2″W
- Built: 1930
- Architect: Edward B. Lee, J.G. Fullman Co.
- Architectural style: Classical Revival
- Website: EICPittsburgh.org
- NRHP reference No.: 86002661

Significant dates
- Added to NRHP: September 30, 1986
- Designated PHLF: 2002

The Energy Innovation Center is a multi-disciplinary institution in Pittsburgh, Pennsylvania, United States, that integrates workforce development programs, green technology research laboratories, a business incubator and collaborative university-industry projects. It is housed in the former Clifford B. Connelley Trade School, which was renovated both to accommodate diverse uses and to serve as a case study for green adaptive reuse. In 2014 the renovated building received the Engineers' Society of Western Pennsylvania Project of the Year Award for Sustainability. It is listed on the National Register of Historic Places and on the List of Pittsburgh History and Landmarks Foundation Historic Landmarks, making it perhaps the only LEED Platinum structure to qualify for Historic Tax Credits.

== Renovation ==
The idea for a sustainability research and education center emerged from a growing concern with green economic development, led by two Pennsylvania politicians, Congressman Michael F. Doyle and Jim Ferlo. In 2008 a consortium of non-profits, unions, community organizations, universities and small businesses formed Pittsburgh Green Innovators, a non-profit organization with a mission to support green economic and community development. One goal was to re-establish a central educational institution for high-demand, skilled trades, with specialized curricula in green energy and sustainability, and the Connelley Trade School was suggested as a possible site. Once on the cutting edge of vocational training, enrollment at the Connelley School declined along with Pittsburgh's population, leading to the school's closure in 2004.

Recognizing that the scope of this work was beyond their capacity, Pittsburgh Green Innovators invited Pittsburgh Gateways Corporation, a local non-profit developer, to lead the project. Pittsburgh Gateways rented the vacant Connelley building from the Board of Public Education, eventually purchasing it in 2011. In Spring of the following year, with permission from the National Register of Historic Places, renovation began, according to plans designed by DLA+ Architects and design-build contractor Mascaro Construction. Under Gateways' guidance, the Connelley school underwent a massive renovation with the aim of bringing the old building up to LEED Platinum certification standards, at an estimated cost of $40 million. (The project has not yet received certification.) Construction began February 2013. In 2014 it re-opened as the Energy Innovation Center, changing the building address in the process, from 1501 to 1435 Bedford Avenue.

Consistent with the project's ecologically sustainable focus, renovation began with a deconstruction and salvage plan coordinated by Pittsburgh Green Innovators to divert construction and demolition debris from landfill. As of writing the project remains incomplete, but is reportedly on track to receive LEED Platinum NC certification, and even meet the stringent 2013 District energy, water and transportation emissions reduction targets.

== Connelley Trade School history ==
=== Construction and opening ===
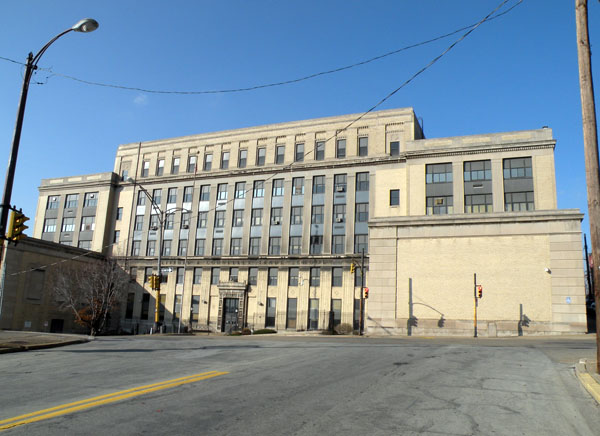
Connelley Trade School in 2009

The Connelley Trade School sits on a 3.56-acre site in the Hill District/Crawford–Roberts & Uptown/Uptown, Pittsburgh neighborhood of Pittsburgh, Pennsylvania. The 172,152 square foot Classical Revival and Art Deco structure was designed by architect Edward B. Lee with builder J.G. Fullman and realized in steel, and clad in brownstone, with brick throughout and an asphalt roof. The academic block housed a cafeteria, gymnasium, auditorium and swimming pool (below ground) - features shared by countless other educational institutions built or added to during the 1920s. By contrast, the shop building, which sits behind the academic block and faces the downtown business district to the north-west, is marked by a distinctive saw-toothed roof. According to a brief history of the school, compiled by an instructor in the Mathematics and Physics department and published in 1960, the total cost came to $1,754,096.38.

The laying of the cornerstone took place on February 11, 1929, accompanied by an address by James J. Davis, United States Secretary of Labor. In his address Davis argued for an elevated view of skilled labor, comparing the skill of the tradesman to the abilities required of an artist or military leader: "Let us not seek to despise the human hand. It is not so humble as we think. We do not despise the great writers and artists of our race, and these people have been compelled to use their hands in writing their books or painting their pictures. In the old days when a king went out at the head of his army to fight, he carried a sword and did his share of the fighting."

The school's official opening ceremony took place on Friday afternoon, May 1, 1931, presided over by Marcus Aaron, the President of the Board of Public Education and a dedication by Gerald D. Whitney of the University of Pittsburgh.

=== Clifford B. Connelley ===
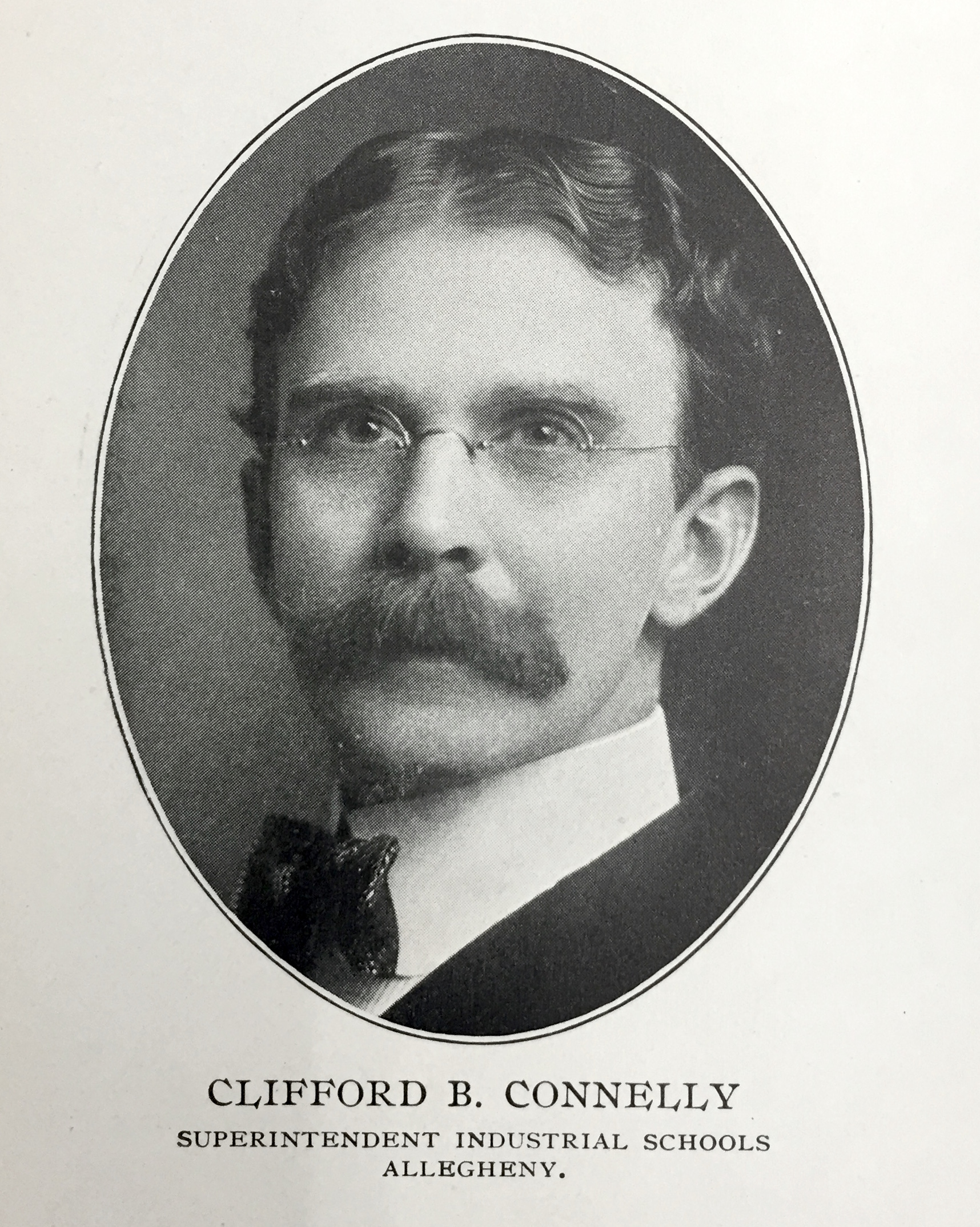
Unknown photographer, Portrait of Clifford B. Connelley, published in Notable Men of Pittsburgh and Vicinity (Pittsburgh Printing Company, 1901).

The trade school took its name from Clifford Brown Connelley, who served as Commissioner of the Pennsylvania Department of Labor and Industry from 1919-1923. Connelley was a pioneer and life-long advocate of technical and industrial education. Notably, he was one of the original designers of Carnegie Mellon University (CMU), retaining an affiliation there for 20 years.

Connelley was born March 26, 1863, in Monongahela City, Pennsylvania, to George and Elizabeth (née Brown) Connelley. Little is known of his childhood and youth. Despite his mother's hopes that her son might one day enter the clergy, young Connelley proved talented at design and handwork, crafting small toys, miniature furniture and boxes. Ironically perhaps, given his later achievements in the field of education, Connelley left school at age 11 to work as a messenger boy for Blair Iron & Steel Company at a salary of $3/week. He also apprenticed in machine shops at Robinson & Rea Company, Pittsburgh, and Williams Sellers & Co., in Philadelphia, eventually completing his high school education at the Seventeenth Ward School. In an unusual arrangement, he took a position at the Western University of Pennsylvania (now the University of Pittsburgh), while simultaneously putting a portion of his earnings towards classes there. He subsequently enjoyed a long and distinguished career in education and public service, eventually receiving honorary degrees M.A. and Sc.D. from Duquesne University.

Connelley's first contribution to vocational education was in founding and serving as first principal of the Fifth Ward Training School. The first of its kind, it trained students in technical skills. Retrospectively, Connelley explained his vision as

a form of technical training which would direct into useful channels the bound-up energy of the restless boys and girls who were not well adapted to academic studies and would need a little special training to enable them to find their places in the industrial system. We were just then beginning to realize what was meant by industrial education by what Mr. Carnegie later called ‘handucation and headucation’.

In 1906 Connelley joined Carnegie Institute of Technology (present-day CMU), initially as Head of the School of Apprentices and Journeymen. Three years later he became the Dean of the School of Applied Industries. He was also a charter member of the Pittsburgh Board of Education, which was founded in 1911, and the Society for Vocational Education, in which capacity he helped implement the Smith-Hughes Act in the state of Pennsylvania. On April 23, 1919, Connelley was appointed Acting Commissioner of the Pennsylvania Department of Labor and Industry, assuming full office on November 13. In a profile of the same year, The Index (a society publication) called Connelley “one of the most prominent educators in Pennsylvania.” His roles in various organizations, clubs, committees and funds which were listed at time of writing as including president, chairman, trustee, director, advisory board member and a member of no fewer than seven community groups.

After a period of public service Connelley returned to Carnegie Tech in 1922 as Director of Industrial Relations, a post he held until 1928. He also served on Pittsburgh City Council from 1930-1934 (during which period the eponymous trade school was erected), representing that body to the Carnegie Institute of Technology Board of Trustees.

Connelley died at his Northside home in Pittsburgh on September 29, 1938. An affectionate obituary published in the Carnegie Alumnus read, "Dean Connelley was beloved not only by the host of students who came under him but also by a wide circle of friends among the school teachers of Pittsburgh." His papers are housed at the Senator John Heinz History Center in Pittsburgh.

=== Vocational education at Connelley ===
At the time of its opening, Connelley was one of the largest and most modern schools of its kind, offering day and night classes in a range of occupations, including carpentry, plumbing, and automotive mechanics. The facilities were designed to accommodate 1500 students, although one source suggests that at its height, it was training up to 1800 per year.

Over the years, Connelley's identify adapted to changing circumstances, each time changing its name. In 1937, the school name was changed from Clifford B. Connelley Trade School to the Clifford B. Connelley Vocational High School. In 1971 Connelley shifted its focus from youth to adult education, changing its name to Connelley Skill Learning Center and again in 1992, to The Clifford B. Connelley Technical Institute and Adult Education Center, followed its accreditation by the Middle States League. It offered classes in computer technology, medical skills, and literacy, alongside its traditional vocational curriculum. Between 1971 and 2005, some 64,000 adult students had passed through Connelley's doors, graduating with G.E.D.s and certificate programs, including English as a Second Language.

=== Connelley's Principals ===
- 1930-1941: Dr. Loron. H. Turner; Vice-Principal: Dr. Joseph W. Fleming
- 1941-1954: D. C. Ellinger; Vice-Principal: Jay D. Fogg
- 1954-1964: Henry W. Dosey; Vice-Principal: Robert J. Gregg (until 1960)
- 1964-1966: Ward Swain; Vice-Principal: James Edyud (until 1966)
- 1966-1968: James Egyud (Acting Principal)
- 1968-1971: Michael J. Wolak
- 1971-1972: Dr. Lucille W. Campbell, Director (Connelley becomes the Connelley Skill Learning Center)
- 1972-1974: Savero DonGiovanni and William Jackson serve as interim administrators
- 1974- at least 1980: Anthony Bellini

=== Decline and closure ===
Vocational education remained a priority for Pittsburgh educators even as manufacturing and industry declined. But retraining and additional certifications were not enough to halt the decline—and eventual closure—of the Connelley school. The reasons for closure were many. First, the institution's new focus departed from the K-12 education mandate of the Pittsburgh Public Schools, which remained the Connelley school's administrative head. Then in the summer of 1995 the Republican-controlled state legislature eliminated $1.8 million that had supported the school's operations through the School Board. Connelley's administrators failed to improve dismal enrollment rates, which continued to fall as the city's population declined. In December 2003, enrollment had fallen to a mere 730, well below capacity. Even worse, the following year, the state cut the $2.5 million annual appropriation needed to support vocational programs. Faced with an unsustainable situation, the school board closed Connelley. Nevertheless, the need for career and technical education remained a topic of debate, and several proposals for new technical high schools were floated, but none realized. The issue was raised again in 2013, this time by mayoral candidate Bill Peduto in a post on his website. In it, he argued for an integrated approach to vocational education, "a Pittsburgh Connelly [sic] for the 21st century."

== Historical designations ==
The building was added to the National Register of Historic Places on September 30, 1986, and to the List of Pittsburgh History and Landmarks Foundation Historic Landmarks in 2002.
