= Entrepreneurship and Innovation Center =

Center at the University of Florida

Coordinates: 29.65130°N 82.34028°W

Entrepreneurship & Innovation Center at the University of Florida
- Established: 2000
- Director: Arnold A. Heggestad
- Students: 2,500
- Location: Florida, USA
- Campus: Stuzin Hall
- Website: Official website

The Entrepreneurship & Innovation Center is a center created to promote Innovation and Entrepreneurship at the University of Florida. The center is part of the Warrington College of Business and is located in Bryan Hall. Around 2500 students are enrolled in classes over the course of the school year. The center works with six other colleges at the university to deliver introductory and specialized courses for both undergraduate and graduate students. Courses taught through the center include Creativity, Global Entrepreneurship, Entrepreneurial Marketing, New Venture Creation, Venture Finance, Entrepreneurial Selling and Social Entrepreneurship.

The center has several programs for undergraduate and graduate students as well as for faculty to promote the concept of entrepreneurship. Several initiatives that the center has started has raised awareness for both entrepreneurship and innovation in both the community of Gainesville, Florida and throughout the country.

== Programs / Concentrations ==
- Thomas S. Johnson Master of Science in Entrepreneurship
  - On-Campus Traditional Master of Science in Entrepreneurship
  - Online Master of Science in Entrepreneurship
- GatorNest
- Social Entrepreneurship & Sustainability Initiative
- Young Entrepreneurs for Leadership & Sustainability High School Summer Program
- Internships

== Events & Activities ==
- Veterans Entrepreneurship Program
- Experiential Classroom
- Gator100
- TEDxUF
- JumpstART
- Gainesville Entrepreneurship & Adversity Program
- Entrepreneurship and Empowerment in South Africa (EESA)
- Big Idea Gator Business Plan Competition
- Entrepreneur of the Year
  - S. Clark Butler Entrepreneurship Award

== Student organizations ==
- CEI Ambassadors
- Entrepreneurship Club (eClub)
- TedxUF
- TED Club
- Change the World
