= Glencar =

Glencar may refer to:

- Glencar Lough, a lake in the electoral division of Glencar, between County Sligo and County Leitrim in Ireland
- Glencar, Letterkenny, a district spanning the townlands of Glencar Irish and Glencar Scotch in County Donegal, Ireland
- Glencar, County Kerry, a populated area in County Kerry, Ireland
