= Nagi Naganathan =

7th President of the Oregon Institute of Technology
- Incumbent
- Assumed office March 31, 2017
- Preceded by: Christopher Maples; Jay Kenton (interim)

Interim President of the University of Toledo
- In office July 1, 2014 – June 30, 2015
- Preceded by: Lloyd Jacobs
- Succeeded by: Sharon Gaber

Nagi Ganapathy Naganathan is the current president of the Oregon Institute of Technology and the former dean of the College of Engineering at the University of Toledo.

== Education ==
Naganathan received his bachelor's degree in mechanical engineering from Regional Engineering College, Tiruchirappalli (now known as National Institute of Technology, Tiruchirappalli), master's degree in mechanical and industrial engineering from Clarkson University and his doctorate of philosophy degree in mechanical engineering from Oklahoma State University.

== Career ==
Born in Madras, India; he was named interim president of the University of Toledo serving since July 1, 2014. In November 2016, Naganathan was selected as president of the Oregon Institute of Technology. National Institute of Technology, Tiruchirappalli awarded him the Distinguished Alumnus Award in 2007.

In 2021, faculty at Oregon Institute of Technology held a vote of no confidence in Naganathan, citing a disregard of university policy, shared governance, and fiscal management. The vote passed with approval from roughly 92% of faculty.
