= Advanced Technical Intelligence Center =

Advanced Technical Intelligence Center (ATIC)
- Type: Nonprofit
- Industry: Research and development Education; Training; Intelligence; MASINT; GEOINT; Remote sensing Radar; IMINT; CBRNE; Homeland security Cyber Security
- Founded: 2006; 20 years ago Beavercreek, Ohio, U.S.
- Headquarters: Greater Dayton Area; Miami Valley
- Website: Wright State University Research Institute

The Advanced Technical Intelligence Center for Human Capital Development (ATIC) is a university and industry-focused research, education, and training nonprofit corporation within the Dayton Region. It consolidates technical intelligence education and training in the DoD, national agencies, and civilian institutes and industry.

ATIC incorporates on-site and distance learning environments and a research lab. It is close to the National Air and Space Intelligence Center (NASIC), a technical intelligence exploitation center; the scientists and engineers of the Air Force Research Laboratory (AFRL); the Air Force Institute of Technology (AFIT), an Associate member of the National Intelligence University System; and the growing contractor base in the Dayton region. ATIC reinforces Wright Patterson Air Force Base’s (WPAFB) in education, training, research, development and operational employment of intelligence data.

== History ==
ATIC was formed in 1945 by a confederation of Dayton-area government, industry and academic organizations with congressionally directed funding to help solve the shortage of technical intelligence expertise. Growth in the use of technical intelligence, e.g., Measurement and Signature Intelligence (MASINT)/Advanced Geospatial Intelligence (AGI), Geospatial Intelligence (GEOINT) and Signals Intelligence (SIGINT)—combined with the increased application of Human Intelligence (HUMINT) and Open Source Intelligence (OSINT)—by the Intelligence Community (IC) and warfighters are straining the technical intelligence workforce. This is leading to a nationwide shortage of expertise with appropriate clearances. Growth in this workforce from within civilian U.S. graduate schools is hindered by the increasing numbers of foreign national faculty and students enrolled in engineering and science programs. ATIC intends to be the only not-for-profit organization of its kind, to offer the IC specialized, technical, in-residence and distance learning, short courses, certificate programs, accredited associate and bachelor programs, along with the ability to host conferences and events in a secure auditorium, Video Teleconferencing (VTC) and/or meeting room capability, all delivered from a single, secure location.

== Aims ==
The ATIC aim is to develop an Advanced Technical Intelligence (ATI) workforce by providing training and education to all elements of the Intelligence Community (IC) and those interested in becoming part of the IC, and by providing research facilities for emerging technologies. To accomplish this mission, the ATIC will operate an educational and research facility, staffed by faculty and subject-matter experts, to instruct and grow this workforce in the Dayton area.

== Customers ==
- United States Intelligence Community (IC)
- United States Department of Defense (DoD)
- United States Air Force, Air Force Intelligence, Surveillance and Reconnaissance (ISR) Agency
- United States Army, Military Intelligence Corps
- United States Navy, Office of Naval Intelligence (ONI)
- Defense Intelligence Agency (DIA)
- National Geospatial-Intelligence Agency (NGA)
- Department of Homeland Security (DHS)
- Defense contractors

== Board of Trustees and Officers ==
ATIC has a Board of Trustees. Members come from a variety of backgrounds and professions.

- Dr. David Hopkins (Wright State University, ATIC Chairman)
- Mr. Hugh K. Bolton (ATIC, President & CEO)
- Ms. Ellen McCarthy (Intelligence and National Security Alliance)
- Mr. Jeff Hoagland (Dayton Development Coalition)

Officers

- Mr. Hugh K. Bolton (ATIC, President & CEO)
- Ms. Beverly Shillito (Sebaly Shillito + Dyer, ATIC Secretary)

== Collaborative partners ==
- AFIT Center for MASINT Studies and Research (CMSR), whose education and research programs have led the way in approaches to human capital development for the IC
- AFRL, a leader in Intelligence, Surveillance, and Reconnaissance (ISR), materials, and human effectiveness research
- NASIC, a scientific and technical intelligence center serving as the primary (DoD) producer of foreign aerospace intelligence
- Dayton Development Coalition (DDC), the regional economic development and advocacy organization whose mission is to support job creation for the citizens of the Dayton region
- Wright State University (WSU), the state university in the Dayton area serving nearly 17,000 students, offering more than 100 undergraduate and 50 Ph.D., graduate, and professional degrees
- Riverside Research Institute (RRI), an independent not-for-profit research institute that has been at the forefront in establishing the ATIC initiative, which provides technical training, short courses and curriculum in AGI and MASINT
- Dayton Area Defense contractor's Association (DADCA), a not-for-profit, industry association serving as a focal point to improve the defense industrial base in the Dayton region for research, development, and acquisition, which supports aeronautical, aerospace, and information systems and promotes regional economic development activity among local defense contractors and WPAFB
- Ohio Supercomputer Center (OSC), a provider of training, network design, modeling and simulation capabilities, software infrastructure, and research and consulting services
- Naval Postgraduate School (NPS), an academic institution emphasizing study and research programs relevant to the Navy’s interests and the interests of other arms of the DoD, whose programs are designed to accommodate the requirements of the military, such as the newly established Remote Sensing Center
- New Mexico State University (NMSU), a research university whose existing Physical Sciences Laboratory has strong federal undergraduate internship programs
- University of Missouri - Columbia (MU), whose Center for Geospatial Intelligence has strong ties to the National Geospatial-Intelligence Agency (NGA) operation in St. Louis, MO
- National Geospatial-Intelligence College (NGC), the training arm of NGA, providing Geospatial Intelligence in support of national security
- Professional associations: The Advanced Technical Intelligence Association (ATIA), US Geospatial Intelligence Foundation (USGIF), Association of Old Crows (AOC), and others who are committed to the professional development of the ATI workforce
