= Oregon Institute of Technology =

Public college in Oregon, US

- Former names: Oregon Vocational School (1947–1948); Oregon Technical Institute (1948–1973)
- Motto: Per cognitionem, lux (Latin)
- Motto in English: "Through knowledge, light"
- Type: Public college
- Established: July 14, 1947; 79 years ago
- Accreditation: NWCCU
- Academic affiliations: Oregon Higher Education Coordinating Commission; Space-grant
- Endowment: $34.9 million (2024)
- President: Nagi Naganathan
- Provost: Hesham El-Rewini (interim)
- Students: 5,490 (2017)
- Location: Klamath Falls, Oregon, United States; 42.256°N 121.785°W
- Campus: 305 acres (1.23 km^{2}); Remote town
- Other campuses: Salem; Seattle; Wilsonville
- Newspaper: The Edge
- Colors: Blue and gold
- Nicknames: Owls; Lady Owls; Hustlin' Owls
- Sporting affiliations: NAIA – Cascade
- Mascot: Hootie the Owl
- Website: oit.edu

The Oregon Institute of Technology (Oregon Tech) is a public college in Oregon with a residential campus in Klamath Falls, Oregon, an urban campus in Wilsonville, Oregon, and additional locations in Salem and Seattle. Almost all students complete externships, co-ops, or other hands-on training inside and outside the classroom.

== History ==
Oregon Tech was founded as the "Oregon Vocational School" on July 15, 1947, to train and re-educate returning World War II veterans. Under the direction of Winston Purvine, the first classes were held in a deactivated Marine Corps hospital three miles northeast of Klamath Falls. The following year, the school's title was changed to the "Oregon Technical Institute". In 1953, Associate degree programs in surveying and structural engineering technologies first accredited by the American Engineers' Council for Professional Development.

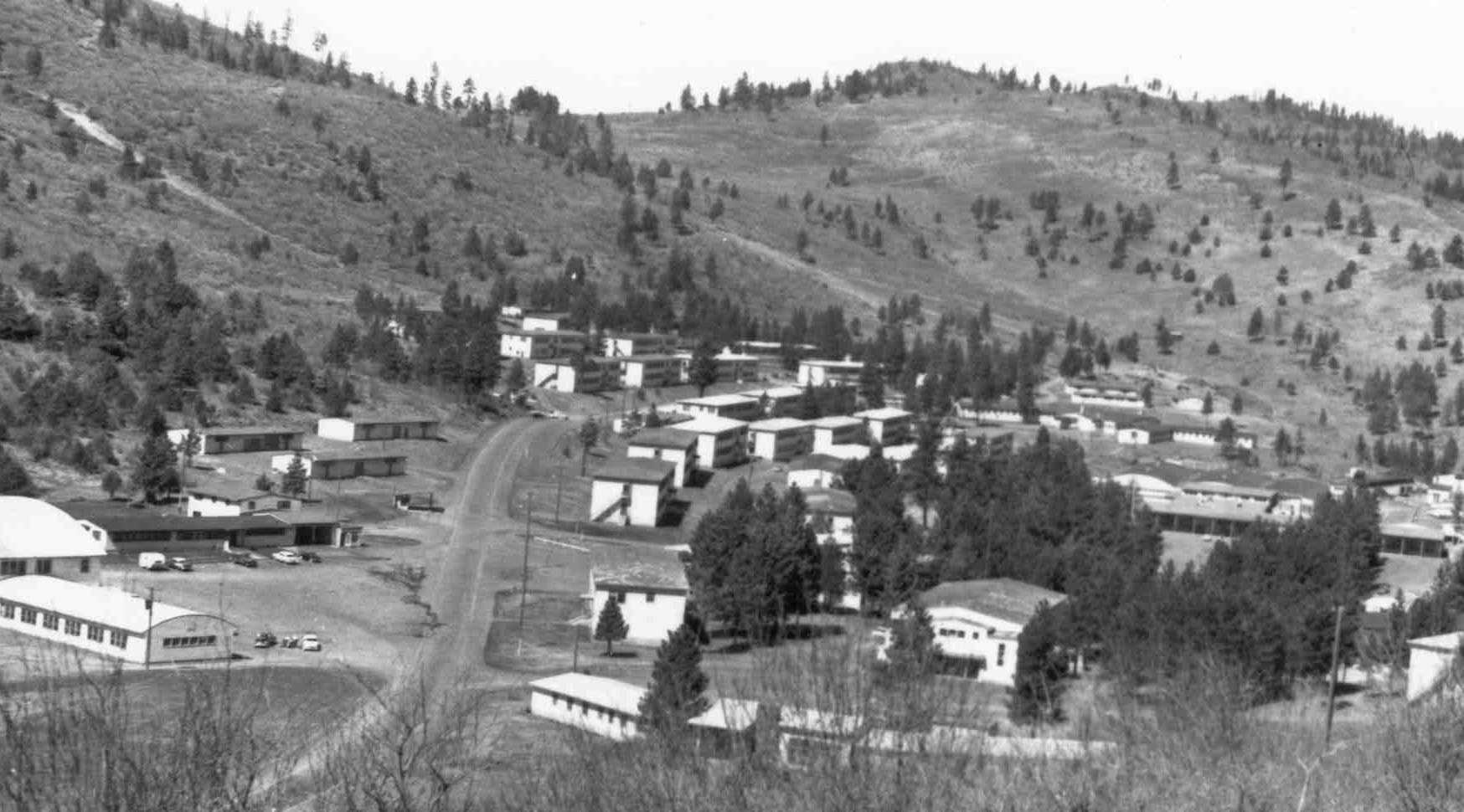
The old Oregon Tech campus photographed in 2012

In 1954, KTEC, the institution's first radio station, went on air. By 1953, associate degree programs in the Surveying and Structural Engineering Technologies were accredited by the Engineers Council for Professional Development. In 1956, KOTI television opened on campus. However, KOTI is no longer operated on campus. In 1962, the institute was accredited by the Northwest Association of Secondary and Higher Schools. In 1970, the first bachelor's degree programs were accredited by ABET. when The first master's degrees were offered 25 years later. In 1975, the first Geo-Heat Center was established.

The campus moved to its current location in 1964, followed by another name change to the Oregon Institute of Technology in 1973. In 2012, the Oregon Institute of Technology officially rebranded to "Oregon Tech." Oregon Tech's four locations in the Portland metropolitan area were consolidated into a single campus in Wilsonville in 2012 at InFocus' former headquarters. By 2015, the Oregon Institute of Technology became an independent public body governed by a board of trustees.

On April 26, 2021, the faculty went on strike after more than 500 days of initial contract negotiations between the faculty union and administrators. This was the first strike conducted by a public college or university faculty union in Oregon's history.

As of 2025, Oregon Tech is Oregon's fourth largest four-year public college or university for student enrollment. Over the previous 10 years, most four-year, public colleges and universities in Oregon experienced a decline in student enrollment, with the only exceptions being Oregon Tech, Oregon State University, and University of Oregon. This has helped Oregon Tech maintain and expand the number of undergraduate and graduate degrees offered even while the state is dealing with budget difficulties.

In 2025, Oregon Tech announced a plan to establish a new public College of Osteopathic Medicine (DO) at its Klamath Falls campus to tackle the rural healthcare provider shortage. Key features include becoming the state's first public osteopathic medical school, an accelerated three-year curriculum, and a partnership with Sky Lakes Medical Center. In 2023, Oregon Tech and OHSU began a joint Doctor of Physical Therapy (DPT) program at Oregon Tech's Klamath Falls campus to target healthcare worker shortages and focus on rural practice needs in the Pacific Northwest. The DO and DPT programs will join existing healthcare-related programs at Oregon Tech, including: nursing, dental hygiene, medical imaging, respiratory care, marriage and family therapy, healthcare leadership, and others.

=== Rankings and recognition ===
In 2025, the personal finance company SmartAsset released new data for the Best Value Colleges in the U.S., ranked Oregon Tech as #1 in Oregon for college graduates' average starting salary of $72,273. The study listed the average starting salary for all Oregon higher education graduates as $52,079.

In 2025, the American Council on Education and the Carnegie Foundation for the Advancement of Teaching recognized Oregon Tech as a "Research Colleges and Universities" university for its financial commitment to research.

In 2026, U.S. News and World Report ranked Oregon Tech as #2 among Western regional colleges and #46 in the nation for best undergraduate engineering program. The U.S. News list of regional Colleges in the West lists the top baccalaureate colleges across Alaska, Arizona, California, Colorado, Hawaii, Idaho, Montana, Nevada, New Mexico, Oklahoma, Oregon, Texas, Utah, Washington, and Wyoming.

== Campuses ==
- Oregon Tech Klamath Falls, the University Residential Campus
- Oregon Tech Wilsonville, the University Urban Campus

== Gallery ==
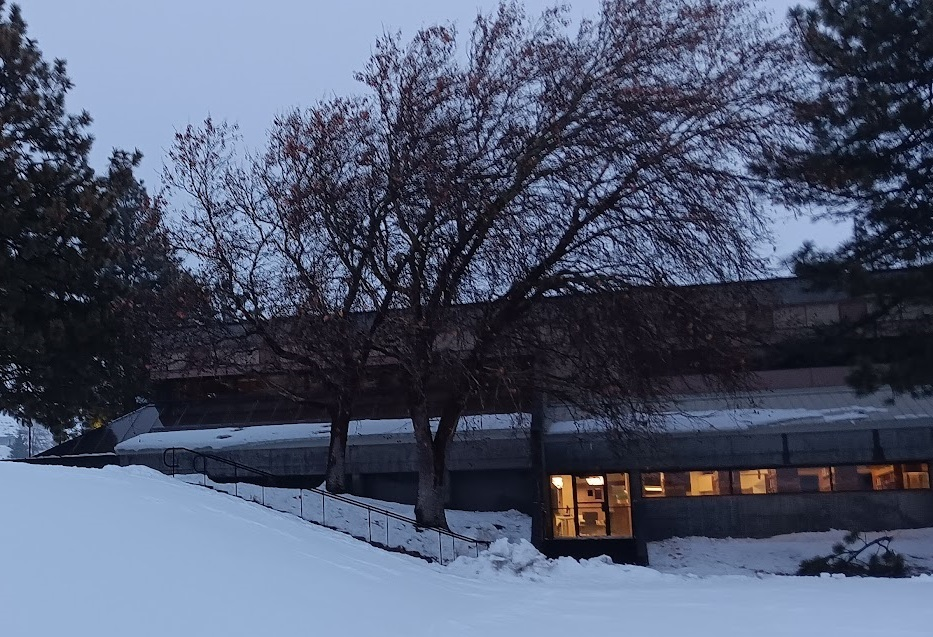
Winter Jan. 2024

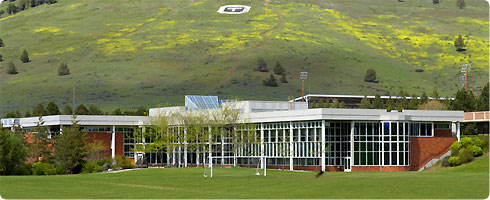
The OIT hillside monogram

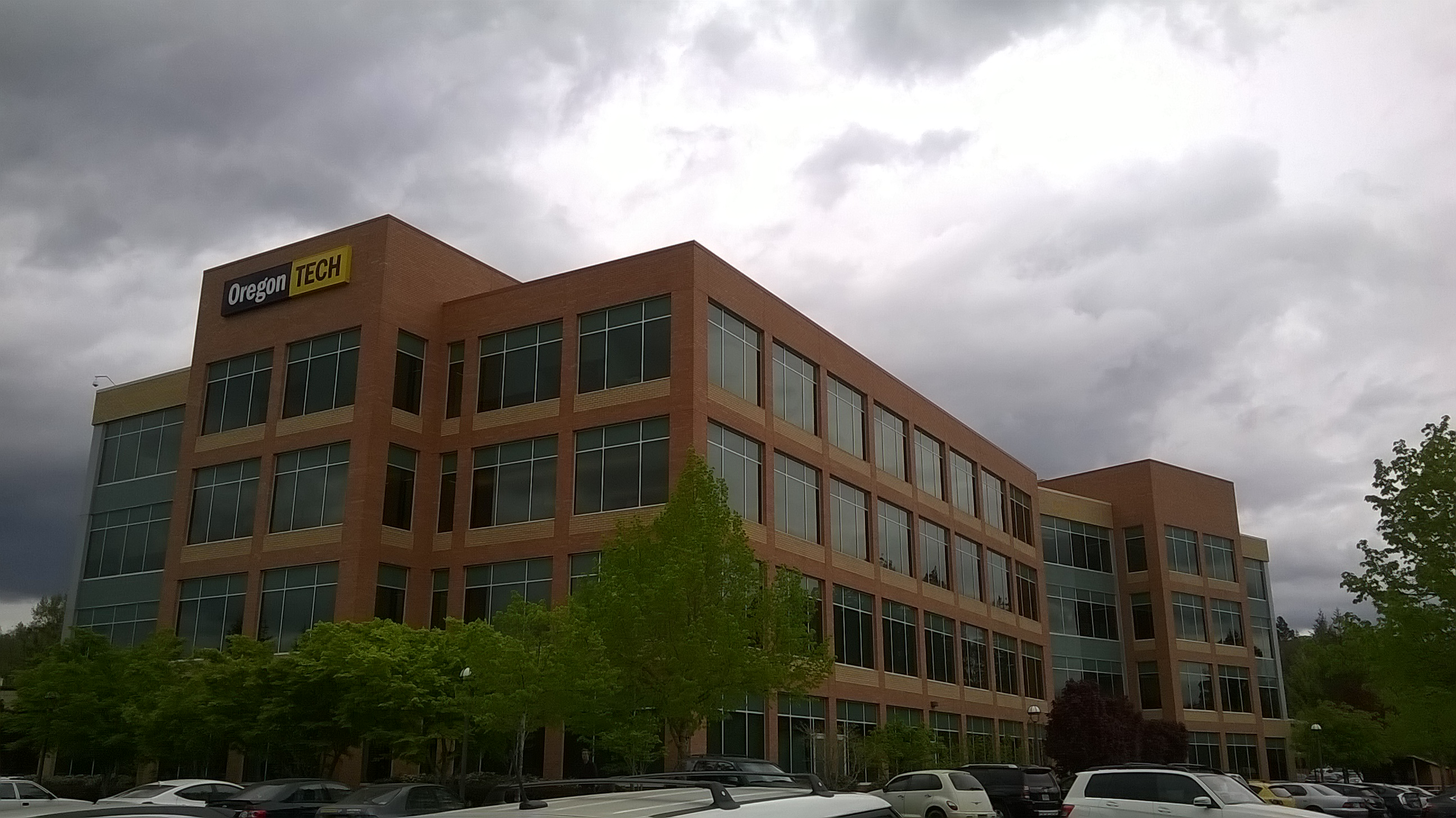
Oregon Tech Wilsonville

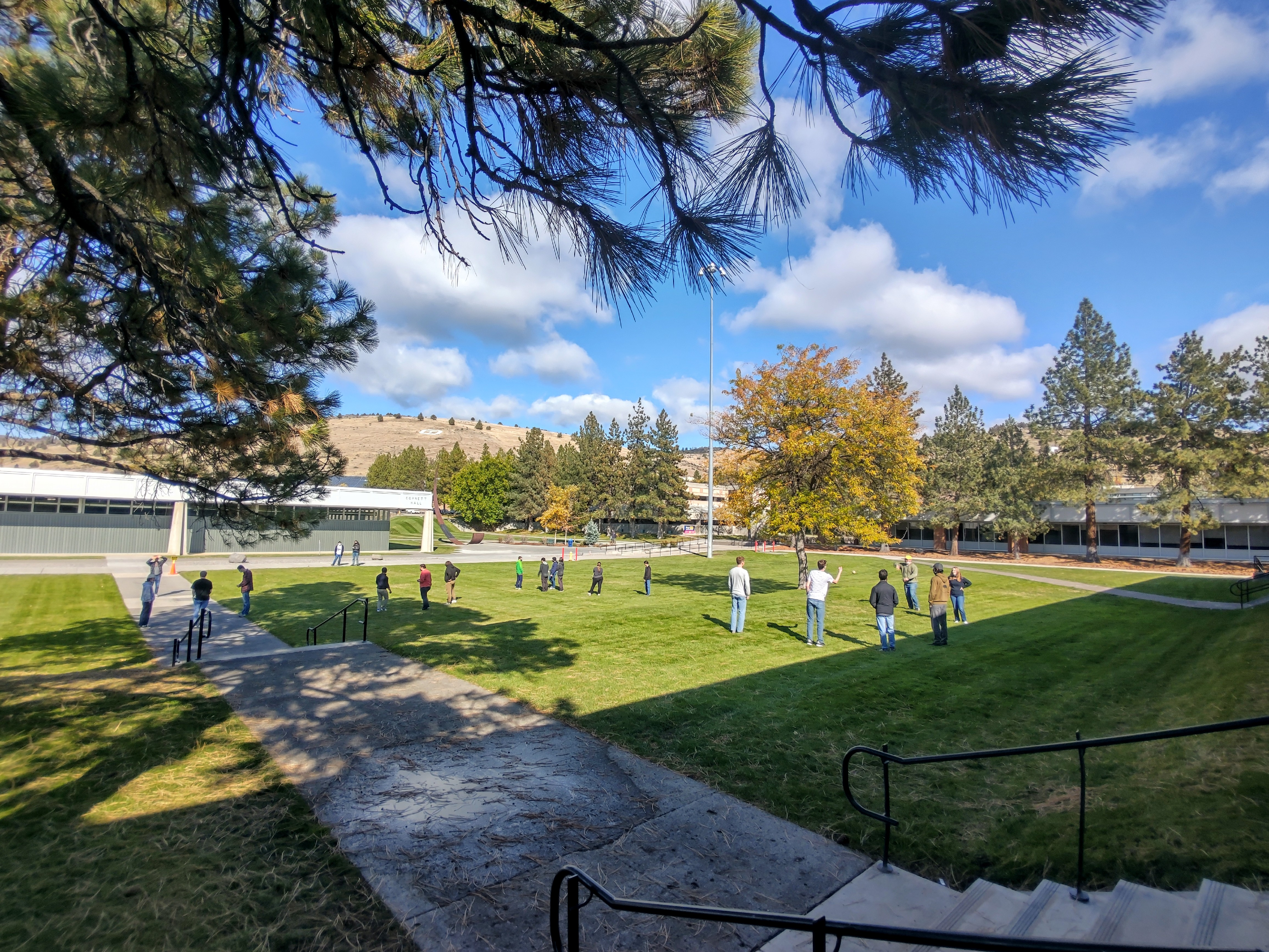
Oregon Tech in Fall season

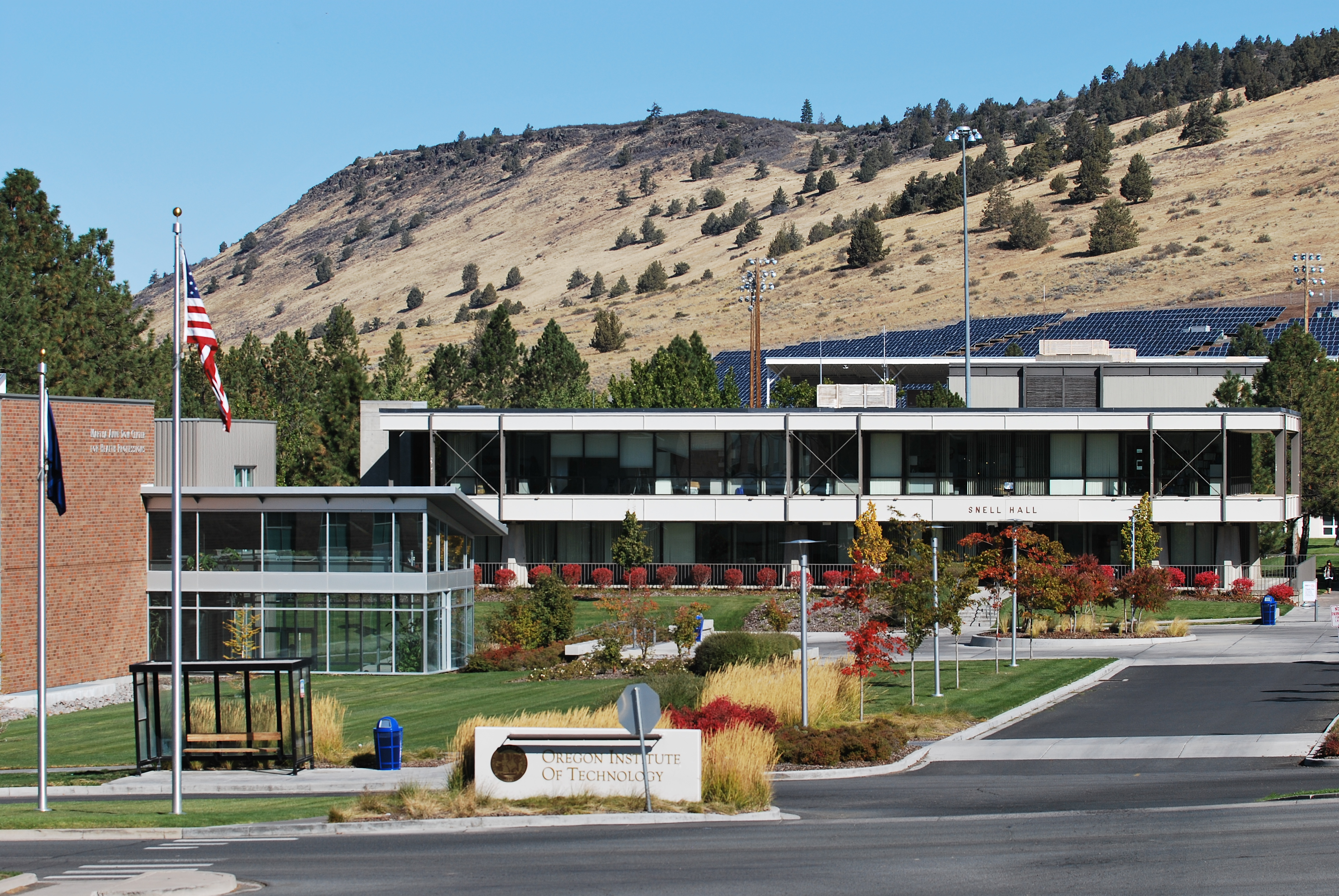
Klamath Falls campus

== Student life ==
Undergraduate demographics as of Fall 2023
Race and ethnicity	Total
White	64%
Hispanic	17%
Two or more races	7%
Asian	6%
Black	2%
Native Hawaiian/Pacific Islander	1%
American Indian/Alaska Native	1%
International student	1%
Unknown	4%
Economic diversity
Low-income (Note: The percentage of students who received an income-based federal Pell grant intended for low-income students.)	30%
Affluent (Note: The percentage of students who are a part of the American middle class at the bare minimum.)	70%

== Athletics ==
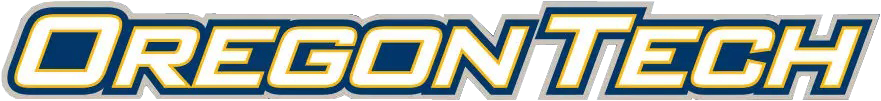
Oregon Tech athletics wordmark

The Oregon Tech athletic teams are called the Owls and Lady Owls (sometimes known as the Hustlin' Owls). The institute of technology is a member of the National Association of Intercollegiate Athletics , primarily competing in the Cascade Collegiate Conference since the 1993–94 academic year.

Oregon Tech competes in 13 intercollegiate varsity sports. Men's sports include baseball, basketball, cross country, golf, soccer and track & field; while women's sports include basketball, cross country, golf, soccer, softball, track & field and volleyball.

=== Rivalries ===
Oregon Tech's traditional athletic nemesis is Southern Oregon University in Ashland, Oregon. The close proximity of the schools and alternate academic foci (science and technology at Oregon Tech, liberal arts at SOU) result in a natural rivalry between the two.

=== Men's basketball ===
OIT has won multiple NAIA Men's Basketball Championships. Former men's basketball coach Danny Miles completed his 1,000th win February 1, 2014, in his 43rd year of coaching at OIT. This is the fourth most of any men's college basketball coach all-time (NCAA & NAIA).

=== Softball ===
OIT's softball program won the NAIA Softball Championship in 2011. OIT was the national runner up in the NAIA Softball Championship in 2021.

=== Mascot ===
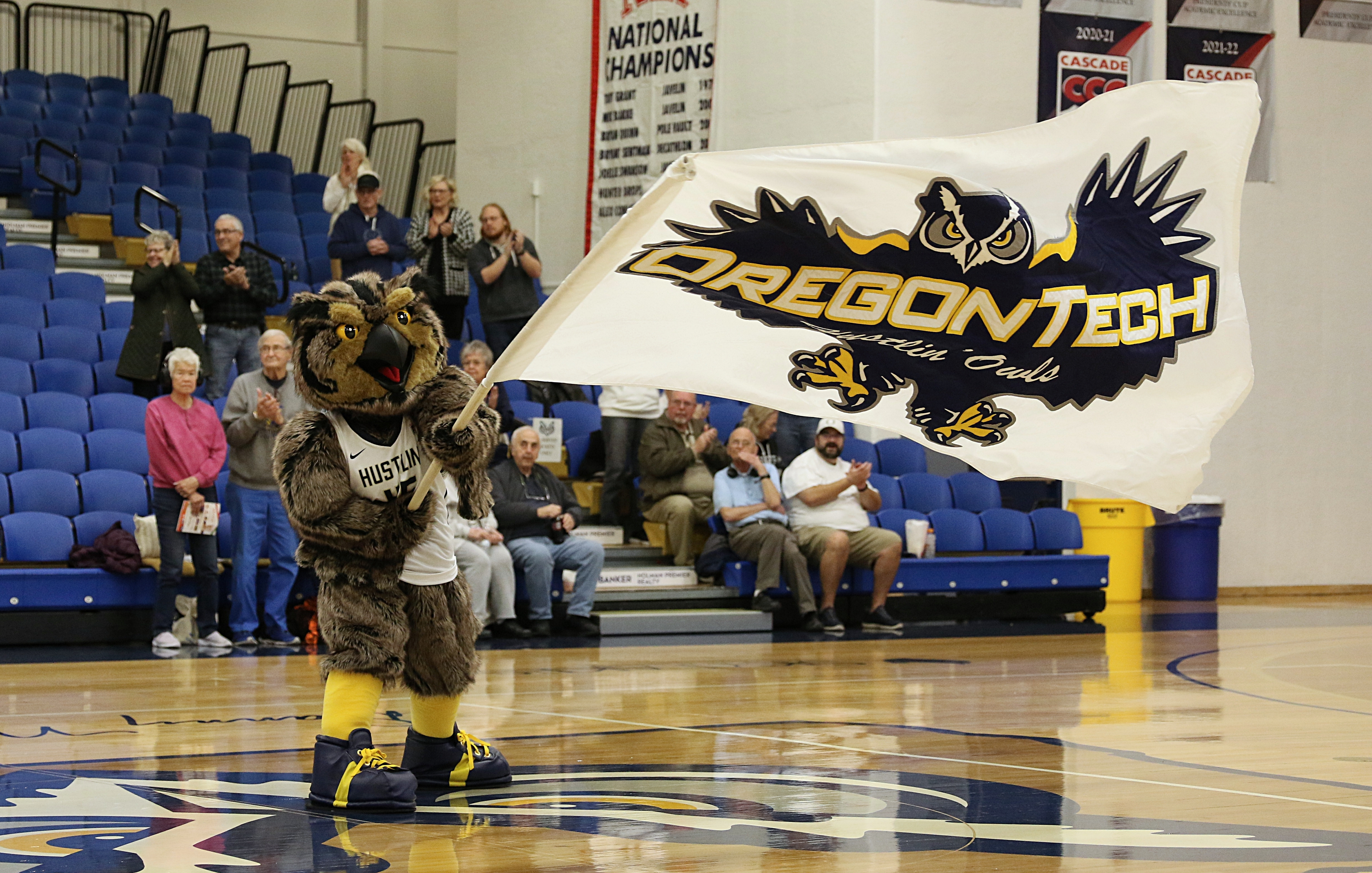
Oregon Tech mascot, "Hootie", waves the team flag during player intros at a home game at Danny Miles Court in Klamath Falls, OR

Oregon Tech's mascot, Hootie the Hustlin' Owl, is a great horned owl and has been portrayed as a costumed character since 1980. He sports the jersey number 47 as an homage to the school's founding year.

Known originally as "OIT OWL", he first hatched out of a giant papier mâché egg during a home football game. Hootie's other alias was "OWLY OOP" in the 1990s amidst the loss of the school's football team, in an attempt to further emphasize their basketball program. The mascot was created by executive secretary Nancy Cox, inspired by the San Diego Chicken after attending a Padres game in 1980 and proceeding previous attempts at an official school mascot such as a rally head in the 1960s named Otis and a live owl.

Notable stunts include skydiving, ziplining, basketball trick shots, and various feats of acrobatics and professional dancing abilities. Performed by actress Brooke Eldridge (2021–2025), as featured on ABC Nightline News. The mascot has won the following awards:

- CCC Mascot of the Year 2014, 2018
- Mascot Training Camp Champion 2023
- Mascot Hall of Fame Awards Nominee 2023 (best video skit, most community impact)

== Notable alumni ==
- Benny Agbayani, professional baseball player
- Joe Cain, professional football player
- Tim Freeman, Oregon House of Representatives
- Ty Knott, professional football coach
- Wayne Krieger, Oregon House of Representatives and Oregon State Police
- Nate Lewis, professional football player
- Doug Mikolas, professional football player
- Justin Parnell, college basketball coach
- Earl Snell, former governor of Oregon
- Don Summers, professional football player
