= Australian Transformation and Innovation Centre =

The Australian Transformation and Innovation Centre (ATIC) is a Thales Australia facility based at the Garden Island Naval Base in Sydney. It is used to put concepts into action by developing and demonstrating new technological capabilities and engineering solutions. The ATIC works with its customers to capture their ideas and then translate these into concept demonstrators. The ATIC was officially opened on 15 March 2006 by the then Minister for Defence The Honourable Dr Brendan Nelson, MP.

== Capabilities ==
The ATIC demonstrates the impact that new concepts, technologies or systems may have on business or military operations. The facility is used to explore a problem space, evaluate possible solutions and demonstrate the benefits or the expected outcomes of these solutions. The ATIC uses gaming tools, simulation and modelling to undertake its projects. Software developers and engineers put together mock-ups of possible future systems and then test these by building wargames and other scenarios that show how the system would be used.

== Past projects ==
Projects that have been worked on by the ATIC include a concept demonstrator for a new naval communications technology, benchmarking a tool to model the soldier's battlespace and creating a test-bed for modelling security scenarios such as civil unrest, peacekeeping and anti-terrorism operations.

== Links to other laboratories ==
The ATIC is part of a network of three laboratories at Thales Australia. The other two labs – NEWLab and Oceanlab – provide specialist expertise in communications and information systems and in underwater warfare. NEWLab and Oceanlab develop system prototypes and reduce risk by using the actual technologies selected for a system solution. The ATIC is part of the Thales Battlespace Transformation Centre (BTC) which has set up similar facilities in Europe and internationally.
