= Mike Hill (athletic director) =

American university sports administrator (born 1968)

Biographical details
- Born: September 26, 1968 (age 58); Clemson, South Carolina, U.S.
- Education: University of North Carolina at Chapel Hill (B.A., 1990)

Administrative career (AD unless noted)
- 1988–1990: North Carolina (sports information student asst.)
- 1990–1992: Ball State (marketing coordinator)
- 1993–1996: Blockbuster Bowl (asst. AD)
- 1993–1996: Florida Gators (marketing coordinator)
- 1996–2000: Florida (director of marketing and promotions)
- 2000–2002: Florida (asst. AD for marketing)
- 2002–2005: Florida (asst. AD for external affairs)
- 2005–2010: Florida (assoc. AD for external affairs)
- 2010–2012: Florida (senior assoc. AD for external affairs)
- 2012–2018: Florida (executive assoc. AD for external affairs)
- 2018–2025: Charlotte

Mike Hill is an American university sports administrator. He most recently served as the athletic director at the University of North Carolina at Charlotte from 2018 to 2025.

== Career ==
Before arriving in Charlotte, Hill was a member of the University of Florida athletics department for 25 years, where he started as a marketing coordinator in 1993 and eventually moved on to become the executive associate athletics director for external affairs. While at Florida, Hill was part of a search team that hired coaches such as Billy Donovan, Mike White and Jim McElwain.

On February 28, 2018, Hill was named the athletics director at Charlotte, replacing Judy Rose, who had served at the post since 1990 before announcing her retirement in January 2018. Hill officially began on March 15, 2018. Hill's contract terms were extended after the successful 2019 football season.

On October 21, 2021 Hill presided over Charlotte joining 5 other Conference USA teams in moving to the American Athletic Conference, joining former Metro Conference and C-USA rivals there.

On October 16, 2025 Hill was fired from Charlotte just 13 months removed from signing a four-year extension.
