= Judy Rose =

American basketball coach and athletic director

Current position
- Title: Special assistant
- Team: Charlotte 49ers

Biographical details
- Born: Blacksburg, South Carolina, U.S.
- Education: Winthrop University

Playing career
- 1970–1974: Winthrop Eagles

Coaching career (HC unless noted)
- 1974–1975: Tennessee (GA)
- 1975–1982: Charlotte

Administrative career (AD unless noted)
- 1976–1982: Charlotte (Women's Coord.)
- 1981–1985: Charlotte (Asst. AD)
- 1985–1990: Charlotte (Assoc. AD)
- 1990–2018: Charlotte

Judith Wilkins Rose is the former director of athletics for the University of North Carolina at Charlotte, Charlotte 49ers.

== Playing career ==
Rose played women's basketball for the Winthrop Eagles from 1970 to 1974.

== Education ==
Rose graduated from Winthrop University in 1974 with a B.S. degree in Physical Education. She received a Master's degree in Physical Education from the University of Tennessee in 1975.

== Coaching career ==
While at Tennessee, Rose was a graduate assistant under legendary women's basketball coach Pat Summitt.

Rose joined the Charlotte 49ers program in 1975 as women's basketball and tennis coach. She served as UNC Charlotte's coordinator of women's athletics from 1976 to 1982. She served as the women's basketball team's first head coach from 1975 to 1982. Rose produced success on the AIAW Division II level and built a career record of 93–56, which included three 20-plus win seasons and two AIAW All-Americans (Paula Bennett and Patricia Walker).

== Athletics administrative career ==
Rose was promoted to assistant athletic director in 1981 and was named associate director of athletics in 1985 to then-athletic director and men's basketball coach Jeff Mullins. In 1982, the 49ers women's program left the AIAW for NCAA Division I, and Rose was named assistant athletic director.

In 1990, Mullins was asked by the UNC Board of Governors to relinquish his dual role. With Coach Mullins' recommendation UNC Charlotte Chancellor Dr. James H. Woodward appointed Judy Rose director of athletics at UNC Charlotte on July 1, 1990. Dr. Woodward promoted Mullins to Associate Vice Chancellor/men's basketball coach at that time.

Rose became the sixth person to head the athletics department and just the second who was not also the men's basketball coach. She was the third woman, ever, to spearhead a collegiate program.

Since her appointment as A.D., Rose added a full-time Compliance Officer, revamped the athletic academic advising program, hired a full-time strength and conditioning staff and developed a goals and objectives program for head coaches, administrative staff and student-athletes.

Early in her administrative career, Rose pioneered the department's most successful fundraiser, the annual Great Gold Rush Auction. It began in 1984 and has generated over nearly $3 million in its 27-year history, including more than $100,000 each of the last 20 years, a record $270,000 in 2006 and six straight years over the $200,000 plateau. She was also the creator of the 49ers' successful "Let Me Play" Luncheon that raises funds for women's athletics. 2011 will see the 8th Annual Luncheon, which has raised over $600,000 for women's athletics.

In her first year as director, the program left the Sun Belt Conference and joined the Metro Conference; the athletic department's D. L. Phillips Athletic Complex, home of the varsity baseball, soccer and softball fields were expanded and plans were finalized for the James H. Barnhardt Student Activity Center and Dale F. Halton Arena.

The athletic program received a construction facelift as two major projects were unveiled in 1994. In October 1994, the Wachovia Athletic Field House, a 10,000-square foot locker room and office complex for baseball, men's soccer, women's soccer and softball was opened. By 1996, the 49ers had the $5.7 million Irwin Belk Track and Field Center/Transamerica Field, a 4,000-seat stadium complex which includes a 400-meter track, Transamerica Field for soccer and 11,000-square feet in field house space. Tennis courts were relocated to make a 15-court venue in the Phillips Complex. The multi-purpose $26 million Barnhardt Student Activity Center (SAC) and the 9,105-seat Halton Arena hosted its first athletic contest December 2, 1996. Rose attracted what at the time was the largest gift in UNC Charlotte history in naming the Barnhardt Center and a second substantial gift in naming Halton Arena. The Miltimore-Wallis Athletics Center, which is an addition to the SAC, was completed in December 2003 and in the summer of 2006, the 49ers broke ground on Robert and Mariam Hayes Stadium. In 1995, Rose and Dr. Woodward led Charlotte into Conference USA and in 2003 accepted an invitation to join the Atlantic 10 Conference in the 2005–06 season.

The students successfully lead the efforts to add a college football program to the Charlotte 49ers, when Chancellor Dr. Phillip Dubois and the University Board of Trustees voted to add the program in 2008. In March 2011 Rose hired the 49ers' first football coach, former Wake Forest Demon Deacons defensive coordinator Brad Lambert. In April 2011 construction began on the program's $45 million home stadium, which will debut for the inaugural game on August 31, 2013.

With the addition of 63 more athletics scholarships for the football program, an offsetting amount of Title IX mandated women's sports will be added. These will most likely include Field Hockey, Women's Lacrosse and Swimming; however, Rose has been an advocate of adding Competitive Cheerleading as a Title IX compliant sport.

Rose coordinated the 49ers effort as host institution of the 1991 and 1993 NCAA Men's Basketball Southeast Regionals, the 1994 NCAA Men's Final Four, the 1996 NCAA Women's Final Four and the 1999 and 2000 NCAA Men's Soccer College Cup. Charlotte joined Kentucky and Minnesota as the only programs to host both basketball Final Fours. More recently, Charlotte hosted the 2008 NCAA Men's Basketball Regional and the 2011 NCAA Second and Third Rounds as Time Warner Cable Arena.

On January 4, 2018, 49ers athletics announced Rose's retirement, effective June 30, 2018. During the last four years of her tenure, the Men's Basketball and Football team did not have a winning season, with football coming off of a 1-11 season and men's basketball firing third-year head coach Mark Price less than a month before she announced her retirement. She was replaced by Mike Hill, who officially assumed his duties on March 15, 2018. However, Rose will serve as a special assistant to the chancellor for intercollegiate athletics until her retirement date.

== Recognition and awards ==
Rose has received several awards over her career, most notably the 2001 NACDA Southeast Region Athletic Director of the Year Award. Other awards have included the Pegasus Award in 1999, the 1996 Bob Quincy Award by the Charlotte Sportsman Club, and the 1996 Charlotte Regional Sports Commission "Sixth-Man" Award for citywide athletic achievement. She was selected the 1996 Woman of the Year in Charlotte and was named the 1997 Citizen of the Year by the University Chamber of Commerce. In 1986, she became the first female inducted into the Blacksburg (SC) Hall of Fame and she received her 25-Year Service Award from UNC Charlotte in 2000. More recently, she was inducted into Winthrop's Athletics Hall of Fame, was named one of the city's Top Businesswomen by The Business Journal and was recognized with the Judy Wilkins Rose endowment as part of the University YMCA's Y Pathways program. In 2010, she was featured by Charlotte USA Women celebrating 20 Dynamic Women and was a recipient of Business Leader Media "2010 Charlotte Women Extraordinaire". In 2011, she was inducted into the Women's History Hall of Fame (Charlotte Club). Rose was among the 2020 class for the North Carolina Sports Hall of Fame.

== Committees and appointments ==
Rose was active on numerous boards, NCAA and Atlantic 10 Conference Committees and is a popular guest speaker. She was chair of the Championship and Sport Cabinet for the NCAA and was recently appointed to serve on the NCAA Workgroup for Resource Allocation and her past committee involvement includes: Division I Women's Basketball Discussion Group; NCAA Diversity Leadership Planning and Division I Men's Collegiate Basketball Partnership. She was on the board of the Charlotte Regional Sports Commission and the selection committee for the Greater Charlotte Sports Hall of Fame. She was a member of the National Advisory Board for the Intercollegiate Athletics Leadership master's degree Program at the University of Washington. She has served on the board of directors of the NC Sports Hall of Fame; the USA Basketball Board, the Metro YMCA Board, the Board of managers for University City YMCA; and the NC High School Athletic Association Foundation. She has chaired the NCAA Walter Byers Postgraduate Scholarship Committee.

== Judy W. Rose Football Center ==
On August 11, 2012, having already secured naming rights for the football center at McColl–Richardson Field; longtime university supporter and former Pepsi of the Carolinas CEO Dale Halton named the facility in Judy Rose's honor. The football center includes locker rooms, coaches' offices, an academic center, a tiered classroom, a training suite, a strength training suite, conference rooms, a hospitality deck, and a players' lounge.

== Personal ==
She married her husband Ken in 1986. The couple live in Denver, North Carolina.
