= Norm the Niner =

Athletics mascot of the University of North Carolina

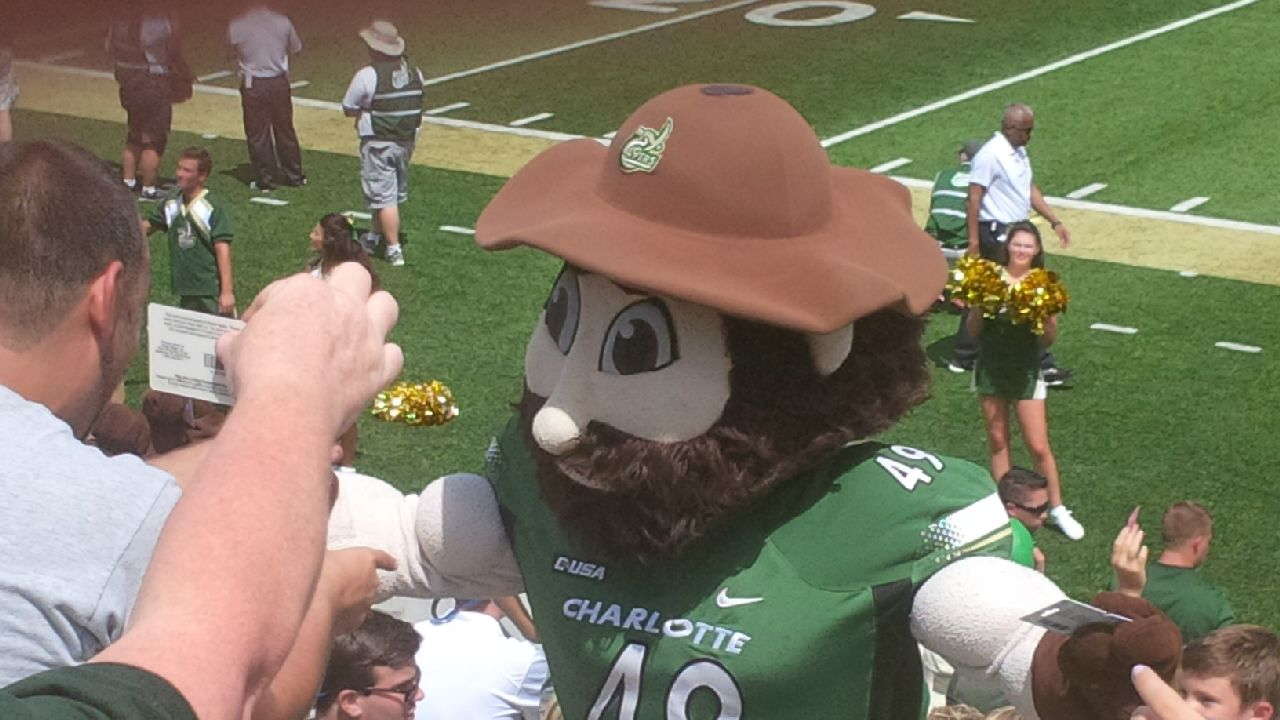
- Norm at Jerry Richardson Stadium during a home football game in 2014
- University: University of North Carolina at Charlotte
- Conference: The American
- Description: Gold Miner
- Origin of name: Student vote
- First seen: 1962

Norm the Niner is the athletics mascot of the University of North Carolina at Charlotte. Norm is a student dressed in appropriate Charlotte 49ers athletics uniforms with a headpiece. Norm made his debut in 1962 after a student vote in November 1961 to change the mascot, with periodic updates to design and wardrobe occurring in the years since. Norm is rarely seen without his trusty pick-axe and never takes his slouch hat off. As a member of the spirit squad, Norm the Niner travels with the cheerleaders to away athletics events, to many events around the university and often makes appearances around Charlotte and the surrounding region. Norm has also made appearances in commercials for local and regional businesses that sponsor 49ers Athletics.

== History ==
The nickname "49ers" derives from the fact that the university's predecessor, Charlotte Center of the University of North Carolina (CCUNC - established in 1946) was saved from being shut down by the state in 1949 by Bonnie Ethel Cone, when the Charlotte Center became Charlotte College. Due to this "49er spirit" that Cone felt embodied the University, referring to the settlers that endured much hardships in traveling across the United States to seek fortune in the California Gold Rush, students of the fledgling UNC Charlotte chose "49ers" as the school's mascot. The fact that the site of the U.S.'s first major gold discovery, Reed's Gold Mine, is located nearby may also be a contributing factor to the nickname.

The fact that the University's Main Campus front entrance is located on North Carolina Highway 49 is pure coincidence.

Prior to the "49ers" moniker, the athletic teams were known as the "Owls" due to CCUNC's beginnings as a night school.

In 2011 Norm was named the 45th of 50 top college basketball mascots by Bleacher Report. Norm's image and persona has steadily evolved over the years.
