= Philip L. Dubois =

American professor and academic administrator

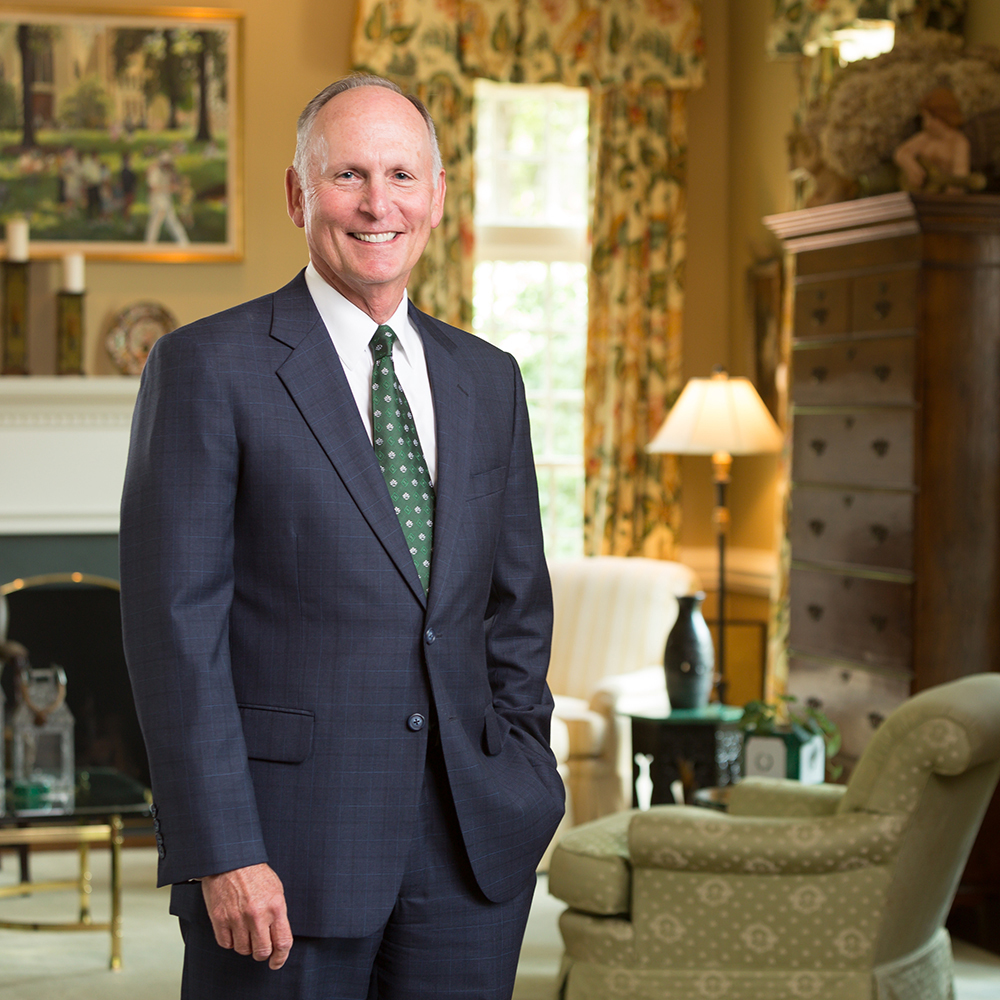
- Born: October 17, 1950 (age 75); Oakland, California, USA
- Education: University of California, Davis (BS); University of Wisconsin–Madison (MS, PhD)
- Occupations: Professor, University Administration
- Years active: 1976–2020
- Known for: Being the president of the University of Wyoming, and senior chancellor of UNC Charlotte
- Predecessor: James H. Woodward
- Successor: Sharon Gaber

Philip L. Dubois (born October 17, 1950) is a retired American professor and academic administrator best known for his role as university president at the University of Wyoming from 1997 to 2005, and later his role as chancellor of the University of North Carolina at Charlotte from 2005 to 2020.

== Life and career ==
A native of Oakland, California, and a first-generation college student, Dubois earned his bachelor's degree in political science in 1972 from the University of California, Davis. He graduated summa cum laude. He then went on to earn his master's (1974) and doctoral (1978) degree in political science from the University of Wisconsin-Madison. He started his career in academics as an assistant professor at UC Davis, and held various administrative positions there. In 1991, he was recruited by UNC Charlotte to become provost and vice chancellor for academic affairs. Under his leadership, he helped establish the first doctoral programs at UNC Charlotte. In 1997, Dubois was appointed as president of the University of Wyoming. During that time, he helped Wyoming's only university implement more academic and support services. He was succeeded by Tom Buchanan. In 2005, Dubois was named chancellor of UNC Charlotte, and assumed the role on July 15, 2005. Under his administration, 10 bachelor's, 17 master's, and 12 doctoral programs were added to UNC Charlotte. He retired in 2020, and was succeeded by Sharon Gaber. He currently resides with his wife, Lisa, in Georgia. He has 3 children.

== Awards ==
- Charlotte Regional Partnership “Jerry” Award (2009)
- Creative Thinkers Award (2012)
- Charlotte Cornerstone Award (2012)
- Charlotte Energy Leadership Award (2013)
- Belk Innovation in Diversity Award (2013)
- Leo M. Lambert Engaged Leader Award (2014)
- CASE District III Inclusion and Diversity Leadership Award (2015)
- Charlotte World Affairs Council World Citizen Award (2016)
- Higher Education Civic Engagement Award from the Washington Center (2016)
- North Carolina Power 100 List (2018)
- Eileen Tosney Award for Career Service in Higher Education Leadership (2018)
- Charlotte Business Journal’s List of Most Admired CEOs (2019)
- Charlotte Magazine Charlottean of the Year (2019)
- City of Charlotte Mayor's Award (2019)
- Order of the Long Leaf Pine (2020)
- Order of the Hornet (2020)
- Outstanding Mentor Award (presented by ACE) (2020)
