= Halton-Wagner Tennis Complex =

Tennis facility at University of North Carolina at Charlotte

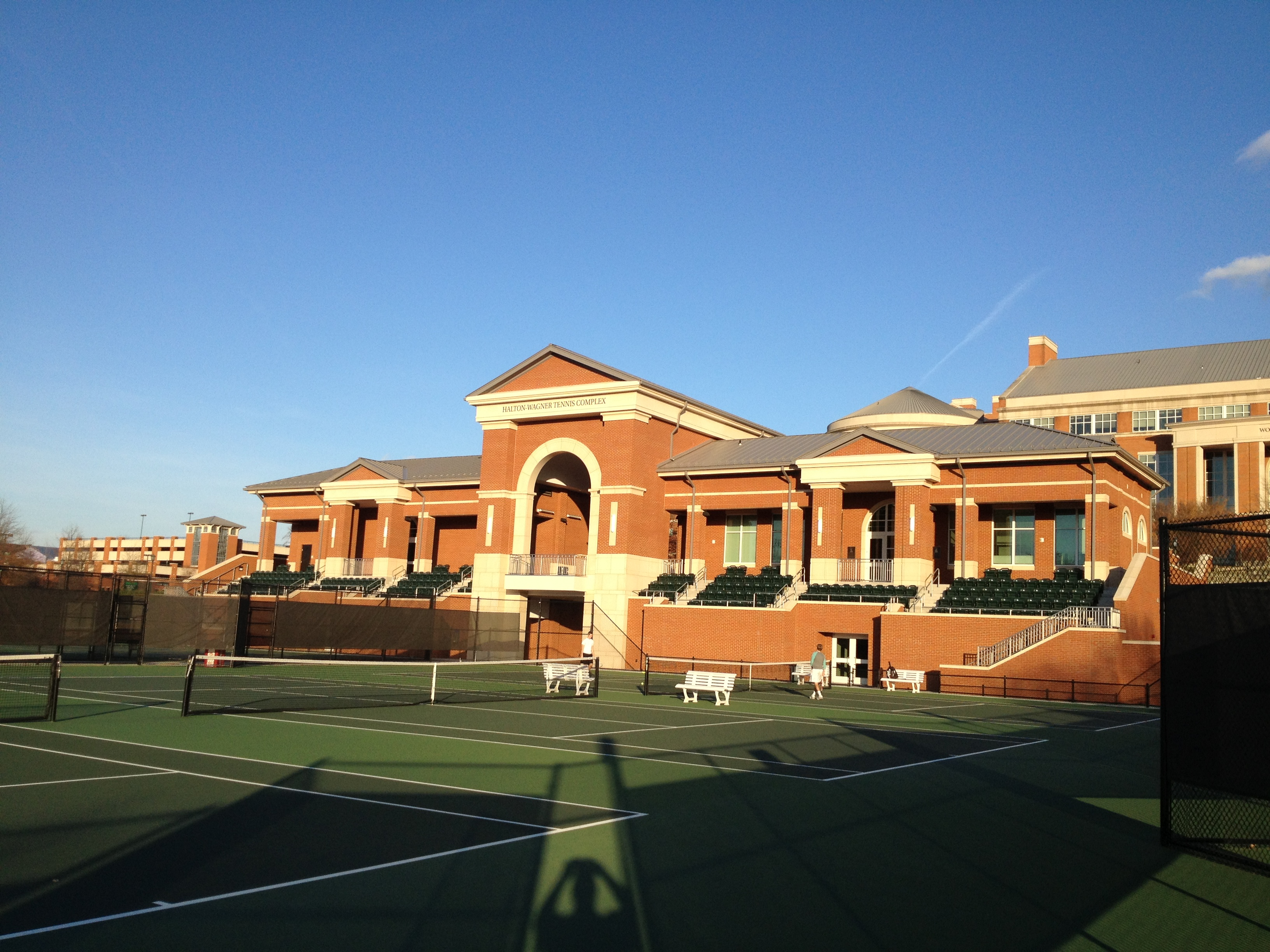
- Interactive map of Halton-Wagner Tennis Complex
- Location: University of North Carolina at Charlotte
- Coordinates: 35°18′26.4″N 80°44′14.5″W
- Owner: UNC Charlotte
- Capacity: 250 (seated)
- Surface: Post Tension Concrete

Construction
- Opened: January 21, 2011 (courts)
- Cost: $5.2 million ($7.44 million in 2025 dollars)
- Architect: ADW Architects
- General contractors: JE Dunn/Chancy & Theys

Tenant
- Charlotte 49ers (NCAA) (2011-present)

The Halton-Wagner Tennis Complex is a facility located on the campus of the University of North Carolina at Charlotte. Rebuilt in 2011, the facility is home to the 49ers men's and women's tennis teams.

== Courts ==
The current 12 courts were constructed to replace 15 previous courts located in the same place at the corner of Phillips Rd. and Cameron Blvd. The court is laid over a post-tension concrete slab which provides a medium-fast ball speed on impact.

== Buildings ==
The courts are served by a small building with men's and women's locker rooms.

A new two-story support facility is between the courts and Cameron Blvd. The new tennis building includes new offices for the men's and women's tennis coaches, new men's and women's locker rooms, a racquet stringing room, and training room with ice and warm baths and taping area. The new building opened in the Spring of 2012.

== Photos ==
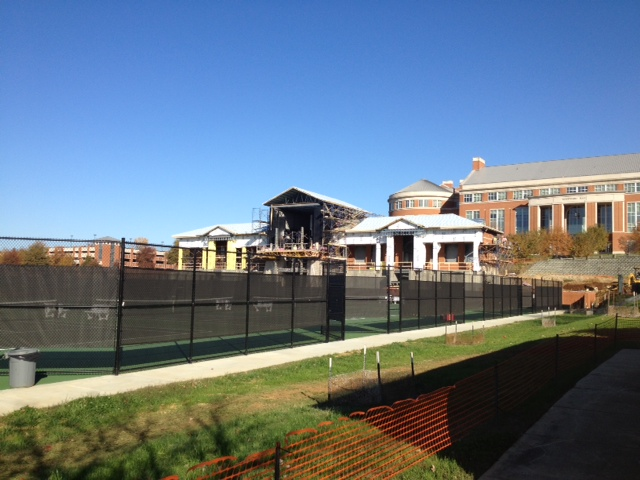
View of building construction

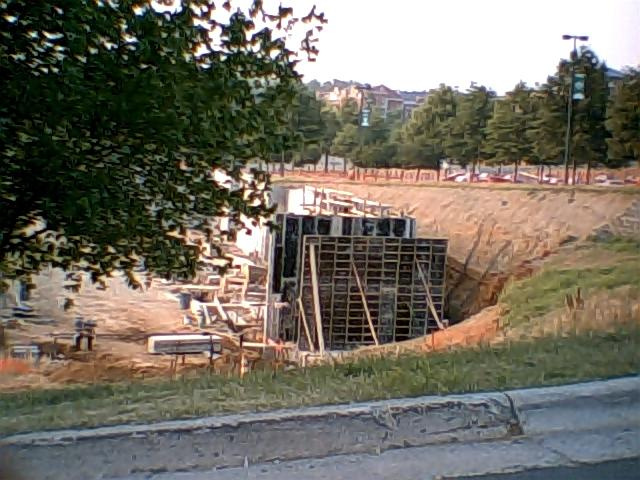
Side view of construction

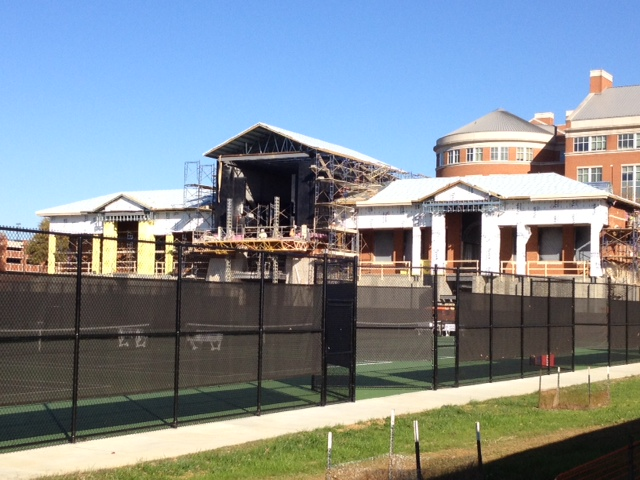
Court view of construction

== Statues ==
Two Richard Hallier athletic statues grace the facility's front entrance. They depict a male and a female tennis player in action. Like the twelve other Hallier sports statues on campus, they were donations by Charlotte businessman Irwin "Ike" Belk.
