= Sharon Gaber =

Chancellor of the University of North Carolina

5th Chancellor of University of North Carolina at Charlotte
- Incumbent
- Assumed office July 20, 2020
- Preceded by: Philip L. Dubois

17th President of the University of Toledo
- In office July 1, 2015 – July 6, 2020
- Preceded by: Lloyd Jacobs; Nagi Naganathan (interim)
- Succeeded by: Gregory Postel (interim)

Personal details
- Education: Occidental College (BA); University of Southern California (MA); Cornell University (PhD)

Academic background
- Thesis: Municipal shelter siting in New York City, 1980-1990: An examination using contrasting theories of decision-making and homelessness causality (1993)
- Doctoral advisor: Pierre Clavel

Academic work
- Discipline: Urban planning
- Institutions: University of Nebraska–Lincoln; Auburn University; University of Arkansas; University of Toledo; University of North Carolina at Charlotte

Sharon Gaber is an American urban planning scholar, currently serving as the 5th chancellor of the University of North Carolina at Charlotte since July 2020.

She served as the 17th president of the University of Toledo in Ohio from July 2015 to July 2020 and as provost of the University of Arkansas from 2009 to 2015.

== Early life and education ==
Gaber grew up in Pasadena, California.

She earned an A.B. in economics and urban studies from Occidental College, an M.P.L. in planning from the University of Southern California, and a Ph.D. in city and regional planning from Cornell University. Her research interests are in planning methods and community needs assessment of marginalized populations.

== Career ==
Gaber was a faculty member at the University of Nebraska–Lincoln. She served as department chair, and held the A. Leicester Hyde endowed professorship.

She served at Auburn University as a professor of sociology and as associate dean of the College of Architecture, Design, and Construction. She was senior associate provost and associate provost for academic administration. She was also the interim provost.

She was the provost at the University of Arkansas from May 1, 2009, to 2015.

On April 28, 2020, Gaber was announced as the incoming 5th chancellor of the University of North Carolina at Charlotte, effective July 20, 2020.

== Awards ==
- Named by the American Enterprise Institute as one of the best college presidents of the century (#25 out of more than 400) in 2025
- Received the World Citizen Award from the Charlotte World Affairs Council in 2025
- Named the 2025 Business Person of the Year by the Charlotte Business Journal
- Named to Business North Carolina Power List (2021-2026)

== Works ==
- "Qualitative Assessment of Transit Needs: The Nebraska Case" J. Urban Plann. Dev. 125, 59 (1999)
