= Charlotte 49ers =

Intercollegiate athletics team of the University of North Carolina

- University: University of North Carolina at Charlotte
- Nickname: 49ers
- NCAA: Division I (FBS)
- Conference: American Conference
- Athletic director: Kevin White
- Location: Charlotte, North Carolina
- Varsity teams: 19 (9 men's, 10 women's)
- Football stadium: Jerry Richardson Stadium
- Basketball arena: Dale F. Halton Arena
- Baseball stadium: Robert and Mariam Hayes Stadium
- Softball stadium: Sue M. Daughtridge Stadium
- Soccer stadium: Transamerica Field
- Other venues: Halton-Wagner Tennis Complex
- Colors: Green and white
- Mascot: Norm the Niner
- Website: charlotte49ers.com
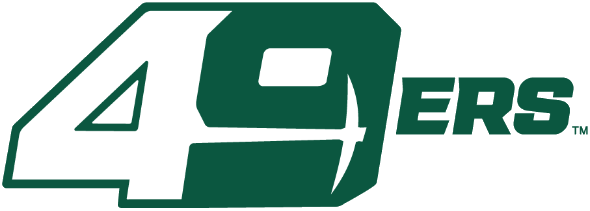

The Charlotte 49ers are the intercollegiate athletics teams that represent the University of North Carolina at Charlotte in Charlotte, North Carolina. The 49ers compete at the National Collegiate Athletic Association (NCAA) Division I level as a member of the American Conference.

The university sponsors 19 varsity athletic teams, nine for men, ten for women with the addition of women's lacrosse in the 2024–25 school year. The other sports sponsored are baseball, men's and women's basketball, men's and women's cross country, men's and women's golf, football, men's and women's soccer, softball, men's and women's tennis, men's and women's outdoor and indoor track and field, and women's volleyball.

== Overview and history ==
American Athletic Conference logo in Charlotte's colors

=== Name ===
The athletics department officially changed its name to simply Charlotte in 2000. Before then, the school's identity suffered from years of constant confusion, most commonly confused with the University of North Carolina at Chapel Hill (Tar Heels). While UNCC and UNC Charlotte were the officially accepted athletic names, media outlets frequently used unofficial nicknames such as N.C.-Charlotte, N.C.-Char, North Carolina-Charlotte, UNC, UNC-C, UNCC at Charlotte, and others. When the name change was made official, Athletics Director Judy Rose summarized the sentiment that drove the name change:

"We're proud to be members of the University of North Carolina university system. But, frankly, we are tired of being confused with other institutions or having our own identity misused and misconstrued. It's harder to make a name for yourself, when your name keeps getting confused. Not only will this logo simplify matters, but it gives the program an exciting new look that better captures our essence."

While the school's legal name remains the University of North Carolina at Charlotte, it changed its academic brand name in 2021 to simply "Charlotte".

=== Nickname ===
The nickname "49ers" derives from the fact that the university's predecessor—Charlotte Center of the University of North Carolina (CCUNC – established in 1946) was saved from being shut down by the state in 1949 by Bonnie Cone, when CCUNC became Charlotte College. Due to this "49er spirit" that Cone felt embodied the university, referring to the settlers that endured much hardships in traveling across the United States to seek fortune in the California Gold Rush, students of the fledgling UNC Charlotte chose "49ers" as the school's mascot. The name is also a nod to the region's mining past during the Carolina gold rush, which led to the creation of the Charlotte Mint. The fact that the University's Main Campus front entrance is located on North Carolina Highway 49 is pure coincidence.

Prior to the "49ers" moniker, the athletic teams were known as the "Owls" due to CCUNC's beginnings as a night school.

=== Logo ===
The primary athletics logo, called the "All-In C", contains a pick-axe, a reference to the Gold Rush, inside a stylized block C placed at a 9° angle. According to the university, this signifies "positive energy and forward momentum".

=== Conference affiliations ===
==== Conference realignment ====
Charlotte began regular intercollegiate athletics play as an inaugural member in the NAIA's Dixie Conference in 1962.

After spending their first five seasons in the NCAA's Division I as an independent, UNC Charlotte became a charter member of the Sun Belt Conference in 1976. They would later join the Metro Conference in 1991, before becoming a founding member of Conference USA in 1995 when the Metro merged with the Great Midwest Conference.

Despite a popular and competitive Conference USA in which UNC Charlotte enjoyed rivalries with the likes of Memphis, Louisville, Cincinnati, Marquette, and others, the collegiate sports landscape underwent a major restructuring in 2004–2005. C-USA took the most serious hit of any conference, losing many of its most successful members, including Charlotte.

After this dramatic reshuffle, UNC Charlotte received an invitation to join the Atlantic 10 Conference, which it accepted. Upon joining the A-10, Charlotte experienced much success in nearly every category with the exception of the signature sport of men's basketball.

With the football program restarting, and an attempt to restore geographic rivalries, UNC Charlotte returned to a revised Conference USA starting with the 2013–2014 academic season, except for football, where they joined in 2015, and was fully eligible in 2016.

On October 21, 2021, Charlotte was accepted along with 5 other Conference USA teams to join the American Conference (then known as the American Athletic Conference), joining former Metro Conference and CUSA rivals there. The 2023 entry date was officially confirmed in June 2022. All Charlotte 49ers programs officially made the transition to the American on July 1, 2023.

==== Conference membership ====
- Dixie Conference (NAIA, 1965–1970)
- NCAA Division I Independent (1970–1976)
- Sun Belt Conference (1976–1991)
- Metro Conference (1991–1995)
- Conference USA (1995–2005)
- Atlantic 10 Conference (2005–2013)
- Conference USA (2013–2023, football 2015–2023)
- American Conference (2022–present in men's soccer; 2023 for other sports)

== Sports sponsored ==
A member of the American Conference, Charlotte currently sponsors teams in nine men's and ten women's NCAA sanctioned sports:

Men's sports	Women's sports
Baseball	Basketball
Basketball	Cross country
Cross country	Golf
Football	Lacrosse
Golf	Soccer
Soccer	Softball
Tennis	Tennis
Track and field^{†}	Track and field^{†}
	Volleyball
† – Track and field includes both indoor and outdoor

=== Baseball ===
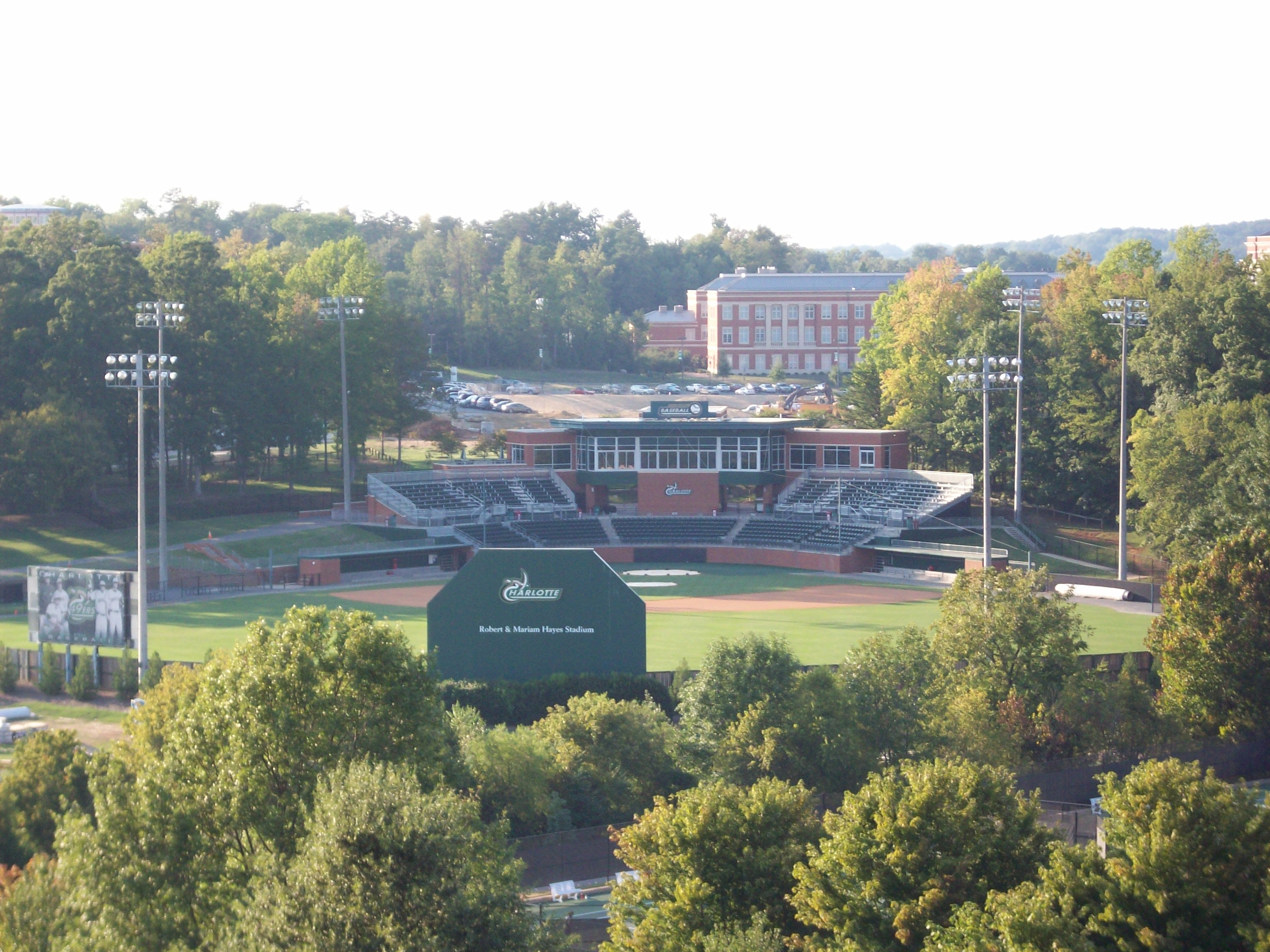
Hayes Stadium has been the home of the 49ers' baseball team since 1984. A major renovation finished in 2008.

- First season: 1979
- Conference Regular Season Championships (7)
  - 1994, 1995, 2007, 2008, 2010, 2011, 2013
- Conference Tournament Championships (5)
  - 1993, 2007, 2008, 2011, 2023
- NCAA tournament Appearances (5)
  - 1993 (0–2)
  - 1998 (0–2)
  - 2007 (2–2)
  - 2008 (0–2)
  - 2011 (1–2)
  - 2021 (1–2)
  - 2023 (2–2)
- Recognized Jerseys
  - 7 Barry Shifflett
  - 15 Tim Collie
  - 5 Joey Anderson
  - 31 Adam Mills
  - 4 Bo Robinson

=== Men's basketball ===
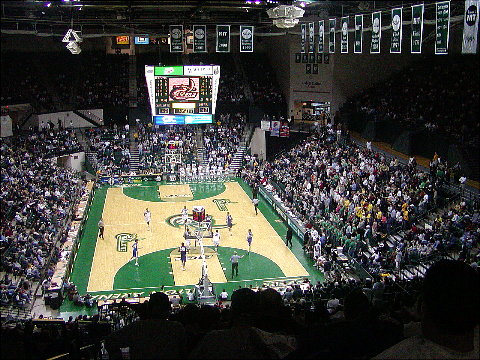
Halton Arena has been the on-campus facility for basketball and volleyball since 1996.

- First season: 1965–66
- Conference Regular Season Championships (5)
  - 1977, 1978, 1988, 1995, 2004
- Conference Tournament Championships (7)
  - 1969, 1970, 1977, 1988, 1992, 1999, 2001
- NCAA tournament Appearances (11)
  - 1977 (Final Four)
  - 1988 (1st Round)
  - 1992 (1st Round)
  - 1995 (1st Round)
  - 1997 (2nd Round)
  - 1998 (2nd Round)
  - 1999 (2nd Round)
  - 2001 (2nd Round)
  - 2002 (1st Round)
  - 2004 (1st Round)
  - 2005 (1st Round)
- NIT Appearances (7)
  - 1976 (Finals), 1989, 1994, 2000, 2006, 2008, 2013
- Recognized Jerseys
  - 33 Cedric Maxwell
  - 32 Melvin Watkins
  - 34 Henry Williams
  - 23 Jarvis Lang
  - 4 Byron Dinkins
  - 45 Charles Hayward
  - 4 DeMarco Johnson
  - 13 Eddie Basden
  - Coach Lee Rose
  - Coach Jeff Mullins

=== Women's basketball ===
- First season: 1975–76
- Conference Regular Season Championships (4)
  - 1990, 2003, 2006, 2022
- Conference Tournament Championships (2)
  - 2009, 2022
- NCAA Appearances (2)
  - 2003 (1st Round)
  - 2009 (1st Round)
  - 2022 (1st Round)
- WNIT Appearances (13)
  - 1990, 2004, 2005, 2006, 2007, 2008, 2010, 2011 (WNIT Final Four), 2012, 2013, 2016, 2019, 2021
- Recognized Jerseys
  - 21 Paula Bennett
  - 35 Kristen Wilson

=== Football ===
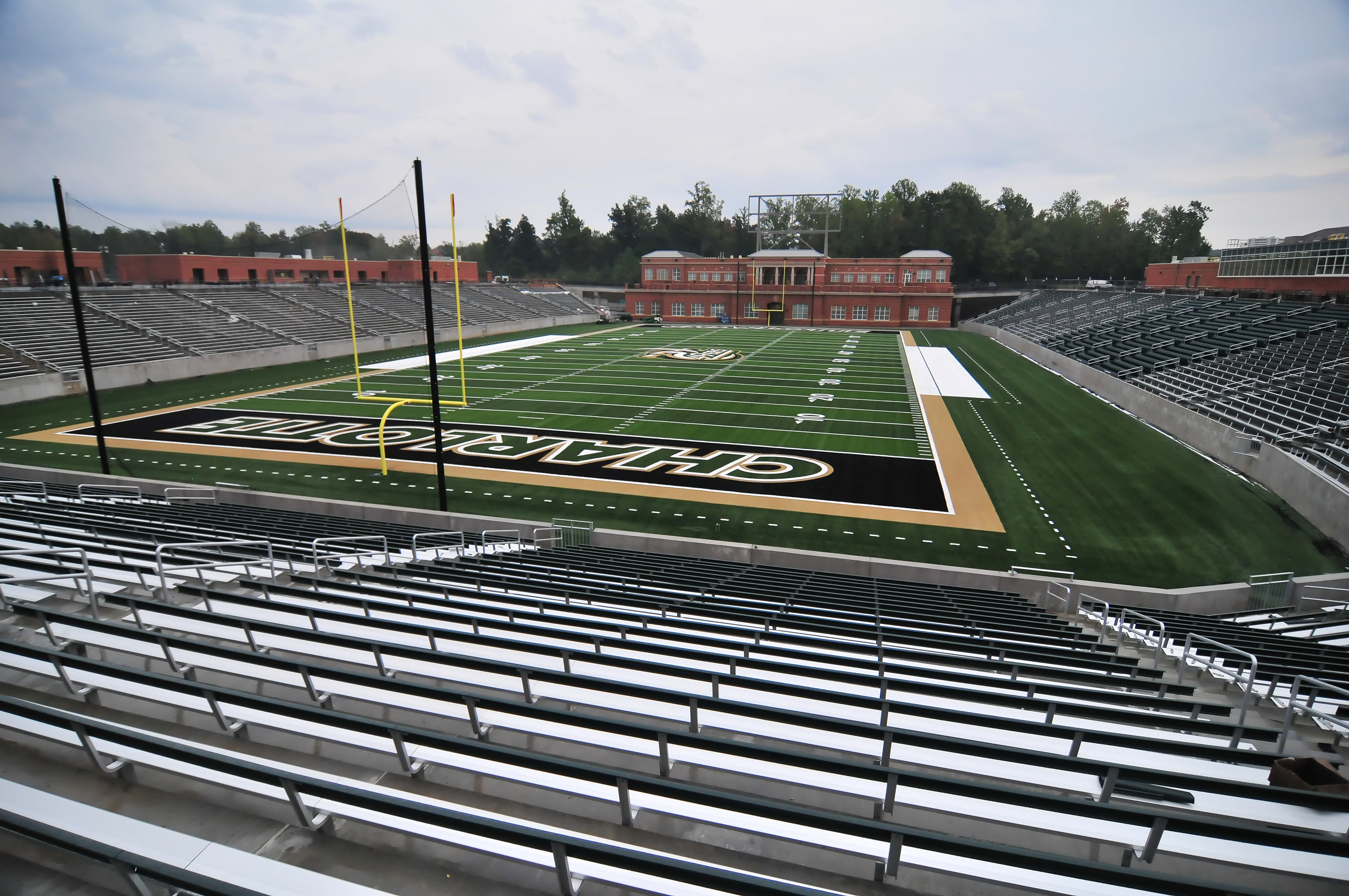
Jerry Richardson Stadium opened in 2013 with the 49ers' Inaugural Season.

The first football program developed in 1946 and lasted until 1948. In 2006, students and alumni began a push for a football team to return to the school. The Board of Trustees approved it in 2008, and with funding approved in 2010, the school fielded its first official varsity football program since 1948 in 2013. The team would post a 5–6 record in their first season in 2013 under coach Brad Lambert.

- First season: 2013
- Conference Championships (0)
- Bowl Games (1)
  - Bahamas Bowl, 2019
- NFL Draft Picks as of 2024 (5)

=== Track & Field ===
- The Track & Field team boasted the most decorated athlete in school history, Shareese Woods. While at UNC Charlotte (2003–2007), Woods became a four-time NCAA All-American, placing at multiple NCAA championships and breaking 12 school records.
- She went on to compete internationally in the sprints and made numerous United States teams at the 2006 NACAC Under-23 Championships in Athletics, 2007 NACAC Championships, and 2007 Pan American Games and 2008 IAAF World Indoor Championships, medaling at all of those competitions.

=== Men's golf ===
- In the Fall of 2007, the men's golf team was ranked as the consensus No. 1 team in the nation by three major polls: Golfweek, Golfstat, and Nike. It was the first national No. 1 ranking in any varsity sport for Charlotte.
- Conference Championships (12)
  - 1996, 2006, 2007, 2008, 2009, 2010, 2011, 2013, 2022, 2023, 2025, 2026
- NCAA Championship 3rd Place – 2007
- NCAA Championship 8th Place – 2008

=== Women's golf ===
- Women's Golf was added to the Charlotte sports lineup for the 2017–18 school year. Holly Clark was hired to be the program's first coach.

=== Women's lacrosse ===
- Women's lacrosse played its first season in spring 2025. Clare Short headed up the inaugural team.

=== Men's soccer ===
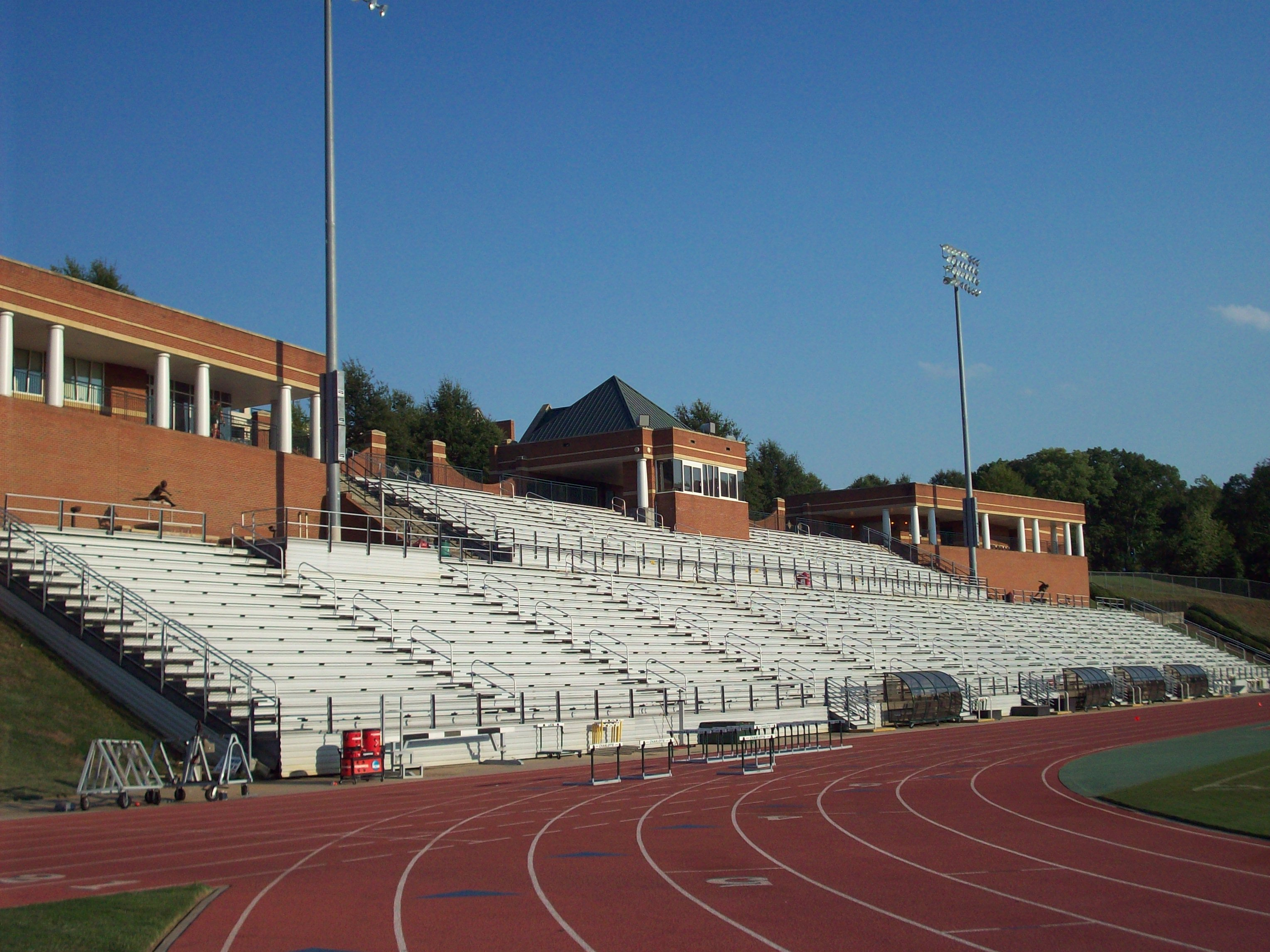
Transamerica Field opened in 1996 and is used by the soccer and track and field teams.

- First Season: 1976
- Conference Regular Season Championships (10)
  - 1983, 1988, 1992, 1993, 1994, 1996, 2010, 2011, 2012, 2014
- Conference Tournament Championships (8)
  - 1983, 1992, 1994, 1996, 2010, 2013, 2023, 2024
- NCAA Appearances (18)
  - 1991, 1992, 1994, 1996, 1997, 2009, 2011, 2012, 2013, 2014, 2015, 2016, 2018, 2019, 2020, 2021, 2023, 2024
- NCAA Men's College Cup (2)
  - 1996, 2011
- NCAA Men's Soccer National Championship Game (1)
  - 2011
- Overall Record since 2011
  - 85-29-16 (W% of 71.5)
- Home Record since 2011
  - 50-10-6 (W% of 80.3)
- Charlotte alumnus Jon Busch named MLS Top Goalkeeper

=== Women's soccer ===
- First Season: 1994
- Conference Championships (7)
  - 1997, 2002, 2006, 2007, 2008, 2010, 2016
- NCAA Appearances (4)
  - 1998, 2002, 2007, 2008

=== Softball ===
The 49ers softball team began play in 1986. The current head coach is Ashley Chastain.

- Conference Regular Season Championships (3)
  - 2006, 2023, 2024
- Conference Tournament Championships (1)
  - 2024
- NCAA Appearances (2)
  - 2023, 2024

== Rivalries ==
Charlotte has had its fair share of intense rivalries. In men's basketball, one of their most heated rivalries was with Conference USA rival Cincinnati, who was coached by Bob Huggins for most of this period. From 1995–96 to 2004–05, after which Charlotte and Cincinnati left C-USA, Charlotte managed to upset Cincinnati teams ranked #3, #8, #18, #20 in the country. In what became known as the Cincinnati Incident, a brawl broke out between Cincinnati and the Charlotte student section, when a Cincinnati player threw the basketball into the stands. This led to the creation of a 'buffer zone' being implemented behind the visiting team's bench. ESPN commentator Andy Katz provided this explanation on why Charlotte-Cincinnati was one of the juiciest rivalries in the country: "The games are hotly contested usually and the fans in Charlotte don't like Cincinnati. They get up for this game more than any other." Charlotte holds an all-time record of 8–15 against Cincinnati, and haven't played each other since 2006

Charlotte's 29-year men's basketball rivalry with the Davidson Wildcats sees two of the three Division I schools in Mecklenburg County go head-to-head for the Hornet's Nest Trophy. They had been the county's only D-I schools before Queens moved from NCAA Division II to the D-I Atlantic Sun Conference in 2022. Charlotte leads the series 26–11. Due to a scheduling conflict, the series was on hiatus until the 2010–11 season.

Recently Charlotte has started to develop a rivalry with the Appalachian State Mountaineers. Charlotte's establishment of a football team, and the competitiveness of the subsequent contests in that sport, have led to a renewed interest and developing rivalry, with games scheduled through 2030.

== Facilities ==
Athletic facilities at Charlotte have improved dramatically over the past decade. In 1996, men's basketball returned to campus full-time for the first time in nearly 20 years with the opening of Dale F. Halton Arena. A new outdoor sports facility, the Irwin Belk Track and Field Center, opened in 1999 and serves as the home to the 49ers track and field teams in addition to both men's and women's soccer. Tom & Lib Phillips Field, the baseball facility, underwent a $6 million overhaul that was completed in 2007; the facility was renamed Robert and Mariam Hayes Stadium in honor of the renovation's benefactor and her late husband. The golf team's practice facility at Rocky River Golf Club in Concord was completed in October 2006.
