= E. K. Fretwell =

American academic (1923–2012)

Elbert Kirtley Fretwell Jr. (October 29, 1923 – October 18, 2012) was an American academic and Chancellor Emeritus of the University of North Carolina at Charlotte. He was born in New York City and is the son of Elbert K. Fretwell, who served as the second Chief Scout Executive of the Boy Scouts of America. He and his wife lived in Charlotte. He died October 18, 2012, in Charlotte.

Fretwell received a B.A. from Wesleyan University in 1944, an M.A. in teaching from Harvard University and a Ph.D from Columbia University in 1953.

== Buffalo State College ==
Fretwell was president of Buffalo State College in New York from 1967 to 1978.

== University of North Carolina at Charlotte ==
Fretwell served as the second chancellor from 1979 to 1989. Under Fretwell, campus enrollment surged from 8,000 students to over 12,000. He oversaw the creation of the Graduate School, created more graduate degrees, integrated the library's card catalog onto an Intranet in 1983, created the ground work for a major business incubator, helped to develop the university's surrounding neighborhood, and increased academic grants to over $6.1 million. Fretwell retired as chancellor in 1989. In 1996 UNC Charlotte opened the E.K. and Dorrie Fretwell building, in honor of him and his wife. The building headquarters the College of Humanities & Earth and Social Sciences.

== University of Massachusetts ==
Fretwell served as interim president of the University of Massachusetts from 1991-1992.

== University of North Florida ==
In 1998, Fretwell served as the interim president of the University of North Florida.
