= James H. Woodward =

American academic administrator

James Woodward is an aeronautical engineer, professor, and past chancellor of University of North Carolina at Charlotte.

James Woodward was born in Sanford, Florida and grew up in Columbus, Georgia. He married his childhood sweetheart at the age of sixteen. Shortly after he graduated from high school and attended Auburn University. He decided he wanted to be an Aeronautical Engineer, so he enrolled in the School of Aeronautics at Georgia Tech where he graduated first in his class in 1961. He received his master's degree in 1962 and his PhD in engineering mechanics in 1967. Upon receiving his degree he taught as an Associate Professor of Engineering Mechanics at the United States Air Force Academy in Colorado. He was promoted to the rank of captain.

In 1968 Woodward moved his family back down south and began teaching at North Carolina State University. In 1969 he accepted a tenured position at the University of Alabama at Birmingham where he would eventually serve as the Dean of the School of Engineering and the Senior Vice President.

In 1989 Dr. Woodward began his long career as the Chancellor of the UNC Charlotte succeeding Chancellor E. K. Fretwell. Under Woodward enrollment grew to 19,000 students. He continued the growth of the Graduate School at UNCC and added new doctoral programs. He oversaw the largest fundraising campaign the school had ever seen as well as construction of several new buildings on campus. Woodward retired in 2005. Woodward Hall, the home of the College of Computing and Informatics, was dedicated in Woodward's honor in 2005. In 2009 the UNC System asked Woodward to be the Interim Chancellor of NC State University.
