= Bonnie Ethel Cone =

American educator

Bonnie Ethel Cone (June 22, 1907 – March 8, 2003) was an American educator best known as the founder of the University of North Carolina at Charlotte.

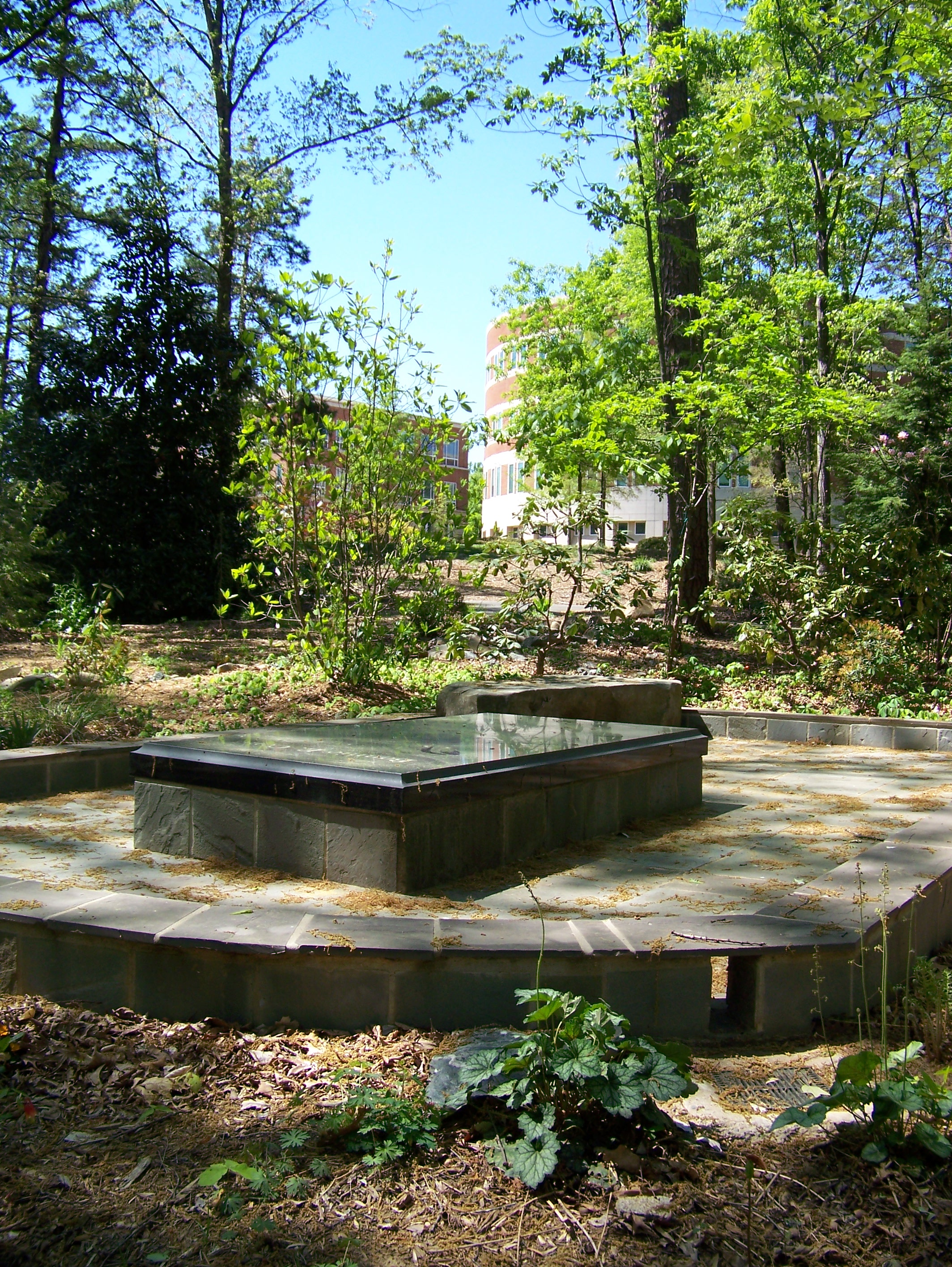
Bonnie Cone's grave in the Van Landingham Glen on the campus of UNC Charlotte, with Cato Hall and Fretwell Hall in the background.

Cone was born to a prominent family in Lodge, South Carolina where her father served as Mayor. She earned her B.A. from Coker College and an M.A. in mathematics from Duke University.

Cone was a teacher at Central High School in Charlotte (now Garinger High School), when the University of North Carolina system opened an extension center in 1946. At the urging of principal Elmer Garinger, Cone became the center's first director. When the state began closing the extension centers in 1949, Cone was instrumental in convincing the state to keep the Charlotte Center open, clearing the way for the Charlotte City Schools to take it over and rename it Charlotte College, a two-year junior college with Cone as president. In 1957, she chose the school's current site in northeastern Mecklenburg County and helped draw up the original campus master plan. She believed that Charlotte College would grow into a university within 10 years, and believed the site was best suited to serve Charlotte and the surrounding area. Under her watch, Charlotte College became a state-supported community college in 1958, and a four-year college in 1963. In 1965, four years after Charlotte College moved to its current location, it was upgraded to university status as part of the UNC system. Cone stated that March 2, 1965–the day that the North Carolina General Assembly voted to make Charlotte College the fourth member of the UNC system–was "the happiest day of my life."

Charlotte College officially became part of the UNC system on July 1, 1965. Cone served as acting Chancellor of the newly minted university until 1966, when Dean Colvard arrived to take over as full-time chancellor. Even though she had led the college since 1946, university system officials wanted a leader with experience running a four-year, public university. Cone and the university were profiled in the July 16, 1965 issue of Time magazine. In the article, she stated, "we are not here to elevate ourselves but the institution," when asked about the chancellor position. She served in various official positions until her retirement in 1973, at which time the main campus's student union was renamed the Cone University Center. Post retirement, Cone served as vice-chancellor emeritus and dean of religious studies.

Cone continued to work on behalf of the school in unofficial capacities until her death in March 2003. She is interred in the Van Landingham Gardens on the east side of the main campus, and a non-denominational meditation center is planned near the site. She is posthumously known as the founder of the school, a title she rejected during her lifetime because she felt many people had a hand in creating and building the university. During her lifetime, she received 10 honorary degrees and was inducted posthumously into the Order of the Long Leaf Pine in recognition to her contributions to North Carolina history. In 2004, the stretch of U.S. Highway 29 near the main campus was officially renamed the "Dr. Bonnie Cone Memorial Highway."
