= University of North Carolina at Charlotte =

Public university in Charlotte, North Carolina, US

- Former names: Charlotte Center of the University of North Carolina (1946–1949); Charlotte College (1949–1965)
- Type: Public research university
- Established: September 23, 1946; 80 years ago
- Parent institution: University of North Carolina
- Accreditation: SACS
- Academic affiliations: CUMU; ORAU; USU
- Endowment: $376.7 million (2025)
- Chancellor: Sharon Gaber
- Provost: Jennifer Troyer
- Faculty: 1,553 (fall 2023)
- Students: 32,207 (fall 2025)
- Undergraduates: 26,213 (fall 2025)
- Postgraduates: 5,994 (fall 2025)
- Location: Charlotte, North Carolina, United States; 35°18′23″N 80°44′00″W
- Campus: 1,000 acres (4.0 km^{2}); Large city
- Newspaper: Niner Times
- Colors: Green, white and gold
- Nickname: 49ers
- Sporting affiliations: NCAA Division I FBS – The American
- Mascot: Norm the Niner
- Website: charlotte.edu
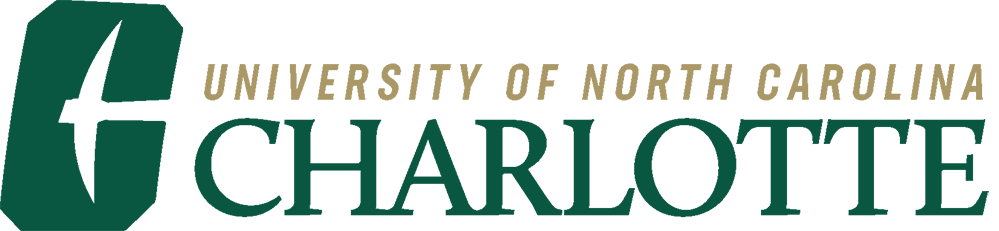

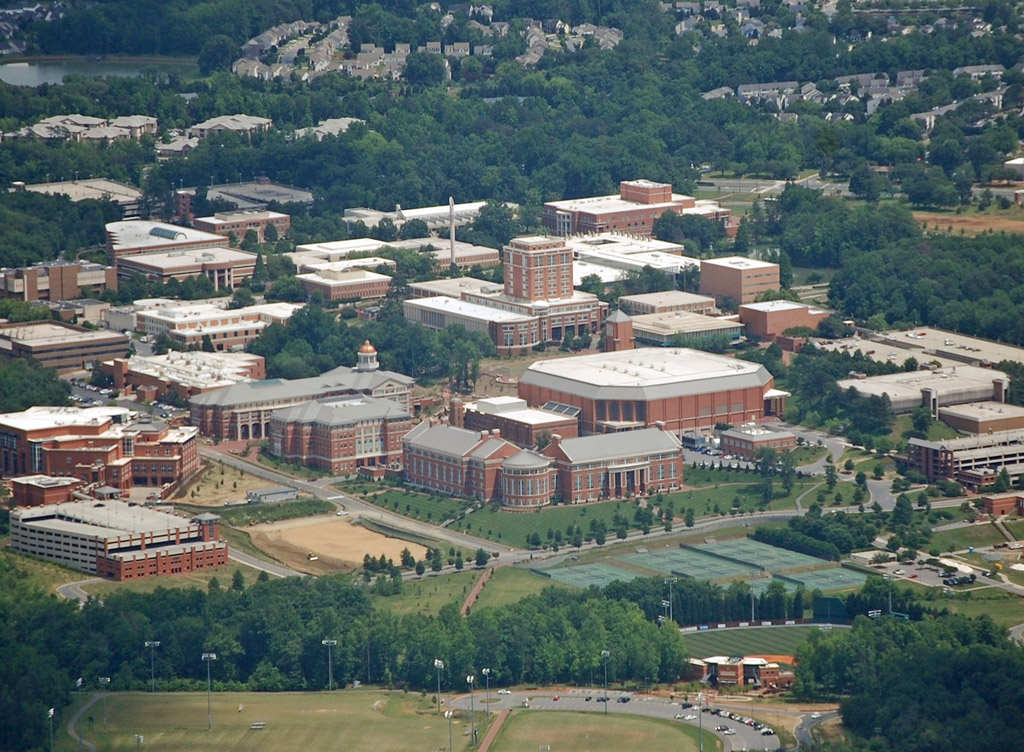
Aerial view of UNC Charlotte in 2010

The University of North Carolina at Charlotte (UNC Charlotte, or simply Charlotte) is a public research university in Charlotte, North Carolina, United States. UNC Charlotte offers 24 doctoral, 66 master's, and 79 bachelor's degree programs through nine colleges. It is classified among "R1: Very High Research Spending and Doctorate Production."

The university experienced rapid enrollment growth in the late 2000s and early-mid 2010s when it was the fastest-growing institution in the UNC System.

It has two campuses: the Main Campus, located in University City, and the Center City Campus in Uptown Charlotte. The main campus sits on 1,000 wooded acres with approximately 85 buildings about 8 miles (13 km) from Uptown Charlotte.

== History ==
Prior to UNC Charlotte's founding, Charlotte had long sought a public university. In the late 1880s, the city bid for what would become North Carolina State University, but lost to Raleigh after a local farmer offered to donate land for the campus. In 1946, the city sought a state-run medical school; instead, the state expanded the existing medical school at the University of North Carolina at Chapel Hill.

In 1946, to handle the expected surge of applicants resulting from the G.I. Bill, the Consolidated University of North Carolina (now the University of North Carolina) opened 12 "extension centers" across North Carolina. On September 23, 1946, the Charlotte Center of the University of North Carolina opened with an enrollment of 278 students. The Charlotte city school system was tasked with running the center, and it named doctoral student Charles Bernard director of the center. The center held night classes at Central High School in present-day Uptown Charlotte. It initially offered only freshman-level courses, but added sophomore-level courses in 1947 by demand. Also that year, Bernard resigned his position to resume his doctoral studies, and the center's mathematics teacher, Bonnie Ethel Cone, was named director.

By 1948, the Charlotte Center was one of only four extension centers still open. The Consolidated University determined that its three campuses could handle student demand, and it announced that it would close the remaining centers on July 1, 1949. On April 4, 1949, in response to local efforts led by Cone, the North Carolina General Assembly created the Charlotte Community College System. The system included two schools, both of which opened in 1949: Charlotte College, which served white students, and Carver College, which served black students. In 1950, the state recognized Charlotte College as a "standard junior college", allowing students to transfer credits to senior colleges.

Cone served as director—and later president—of the college, which continued to hold classes at Central High School. The school was racially desegregated as a result of the U.S. Supreme Court case Brown v. Board of Education in 1954 (Carver College would later merge with another institution to become Central Piedmont Community College). By 1957, enrollment increased to 492, and the school's leaders began searching for a permanent site for the campus. They decided on a 250-acre (100 ha) tract of land northeast of the city. The college became state-supported in 1958 upon joining the newly formed North Carolina Community College System and moved to its current location in 1961. It added a junior year of study in 1963, and a senior year in 1964.

On March 3, 1965, the North Carolina General Assembly designated Charlotte College the fourth campus of the University of North Carolina, under its current name, effective July 1. On May 29, 1966, 81 students became the school's first graduating class as a UNC system school. In 1969, the school opened its first dormitory, housing approximately 600 students, and also that year, the university began offering programs leading to master's degrees. The school's first graduate degree—a master of education—was awarded in May 1970. By 1973, enrollment had increased to 6,123 students, with 853 of those being graduate students.

In 1992, UNC Charlotte was authorized to offer programs leading to doctoral degrees.

=== Leaders of the university ===
Order	Chancellor	Years as Chancellor
1	Bonnie Ethel Cone	(Founder; Director, 1947–1961; President, 1961–1965; Acting Chancellor, 1965–1966; Vice-Chancellor Emeritus & Dean of Religious Studies, 1973–2003)
2	Dean W. Colvard	(1966–1978)
3	E.K. Fretwell	(1979–1989)
4	James H. Woodward	(1989–2005)
5	Philip L. Dubois	(2005–2020)
6	Sharon Gaber	(2020–present)

==== Bonnie Ethel Cone, founder ====
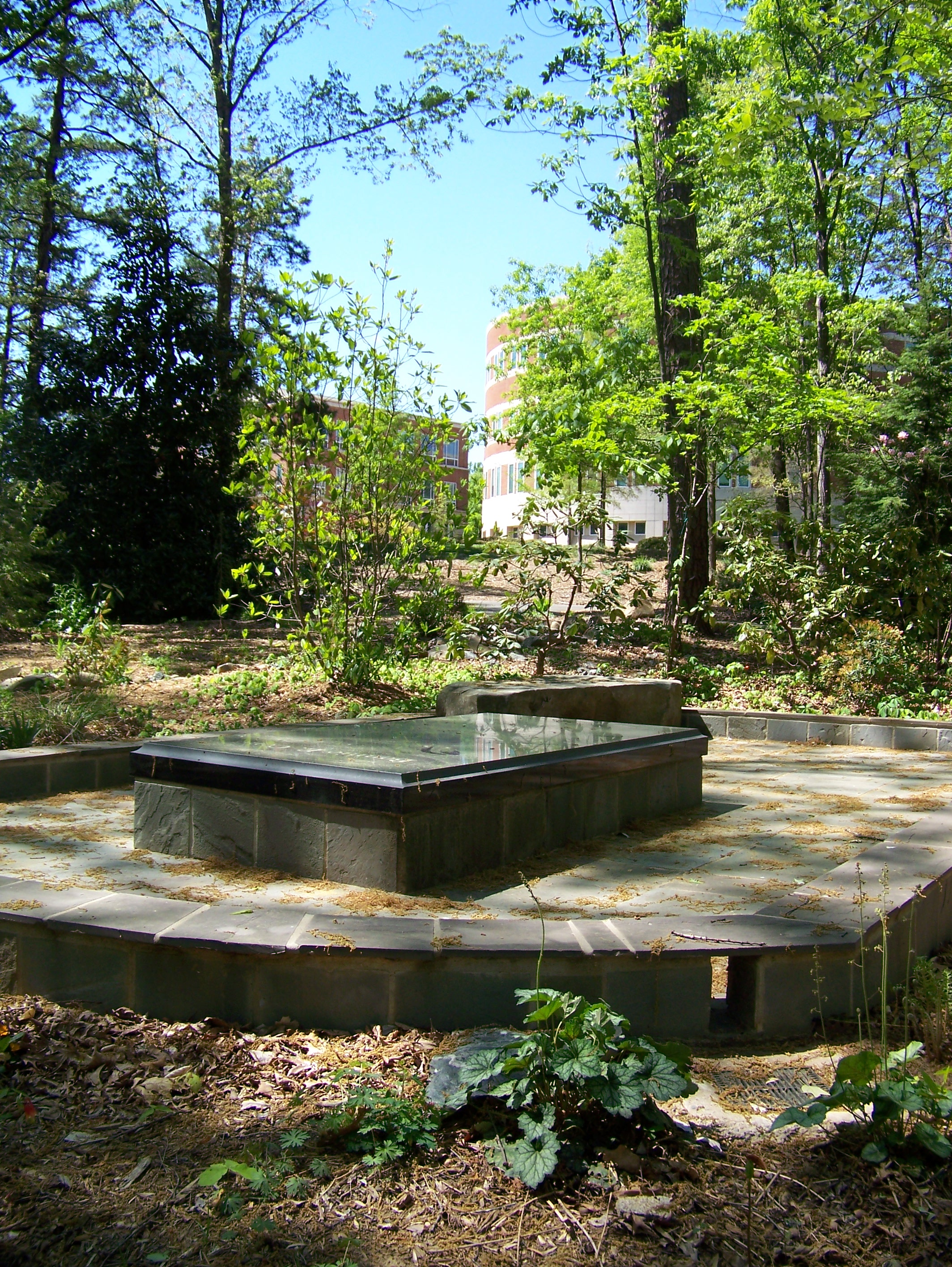
Bonnie Cone's final resting place on the campus of UNC Charlotte, with Cato Hall and Fretwell Hall in the background.

Bonnie Ethel Cone (1907–2003), or Miss Bonnie as she was known to students, was chosen to be director of the Charlotte Center in 1947. From 1949 to 1965, she served as president of Charlotte College. When Charlotte College joined the UNC system in 1965, Cone served as acting chancellor until 1966.

==== Chancellors ====
Dean W. Colvard (1913–2007) was appointed the first chancellor of the young university in 1966. A North Carolina native, Colvard had served as president of Mississippi State University (MSU). At MSU he was the first president to defy university policy of not playing against integrated teams when he ordered the men's basketball team to play Loyola University Chicago in 1963. At UNC Charlotte, Colvard took on the challenge of converting the school from a small college to a four-year member of the UNC system. Indeed, he had been chosen specifically because UNC system officials believed the newly minted UNC Charlotte needed a leader with experience running a four-year university. Colvard oversaw accreditation of the university, development of University Research Park (now one of the top five largest research parks in the country), constructed the first residence halls, created the first graduate programs, and grew the enrollment from about 1,700 to just over 8,000 students. He retired as chancellor in 1978, served as Chancellor Emeritus until his death. Colvard also received the Order of the Long Leaf Pine. The Colvard building, completed on the main campus in 1979, is named in his honor and houses the Department of Psychology.

E.K. Fretwell (1923–2012), the second chancellor of the university, was named in 1979. He came to the university from Buffalo State College where he was president. Under Fretwell, campus enrollment surged from 8,000 students to over 12,000. He oversaw the creation of the Graduate School, created more graduate degrees, integrated the library's card catalog into the Internet in 1983, created the groundwork for a major business incubator, helped to develop the university's surrounding neighborhood, and increased academic grants to over $6.1 million. Fretwell retired as chancellor in 1989. He served as interim president of the University of Massachusetts system from 1991 to 1992, and in 1998, he served as the interim president of the University of North Florida. In 1996 UNC Charlotte opened the Fretwell building, dedicated in honor of him and his wife Dorrie. The building headquarters the College of Liberal Arts & Sciences.

James H. Woodward succeeded Fretwell in 1989. Woodward came to UNC Charlotte from the University of Alabama at Birmingham where he served as dean of engineering and senior vice president of academic affairs. Under Woodward, enrollment grew to over 19,000 students. Like his predecessors, he continued the growth of the Graduate School and added new doctoral programs. He oversaw the largest fundraising campaign in the school's history and its largest building boom; in the summer of 2005, no less than six buildings were actively under construction on the main campus. He also oversaw the creation of the CRI Campus. Woodward announced his retirement in 2004 and left the office of chancellor on June 30, 2005. Woodward Hall, which houses the College of Computing & Informatics, was dedicated in his honor on November 16, 2005. He is currently Chancellor Emeritus and teaches in the university's William States Lee College of Engineering.

Philip L. Dubois was the fifth leader and fourth chancellor of the university. Dubois assumed his duties as chancellor on July 15, 2005. He returned to Charlotte after serving as the president of the University of Wyoming from 1997 through 2005. Previously, he was the Provost and Professor of Political Science in the Department of Political Science (now the Department of Political Science and Public Administration) at UNC Charlotte from 1991 until 1997. Dubois, along with his wife and children, was the first chancellor to occupy the Chancellor's Residence (known as the Bissell House) on the UNC Charlotte campus that was completed in the winter of 2005. His goal was to oversee the process of the university becoming the fourth research-extensive university in the state.

=== 2019 mass shooting ===
On April 30, 2019, a mass shooting occurred in the Woodford A. Kennedy Building on campus, killing two and leaving four others injured. The shooter, identified as Trystan Andrew Terrell, was arrested shortly afterwards.

== Campuses ==
=== Main Campus – University City ===
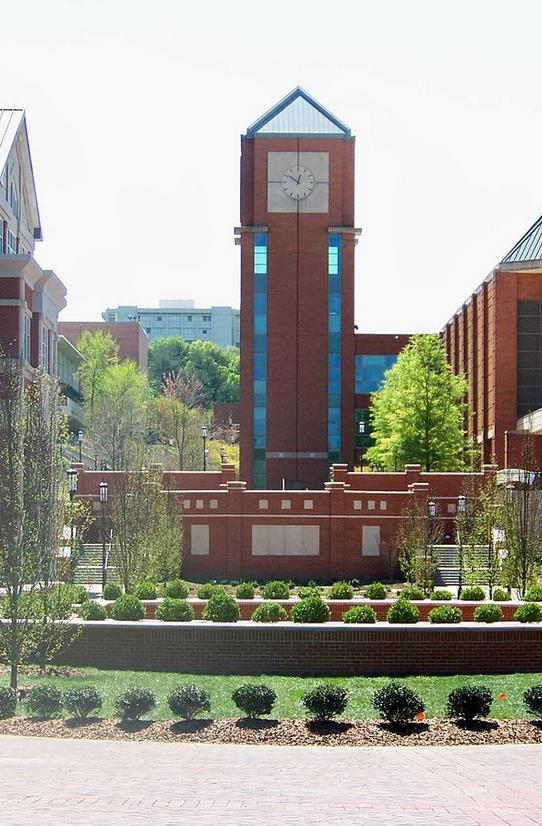
This quad-style area on the Main campus was completed in 2007 with the completion of the College of Health and Human Services Building (left) and Mebane Hall (right).

The Main Campus of the university is situated on just under 1,000 acres (4 km^{2}) of rolling land between U.S. Route 29 and N.C. Highway 49, about 10 miles (16 km) from Uptown Charlotte in the University City neighborhood. The campus is self-contained, meaning that no major roads run through the campus. The campus has several man-made lakes, and is heavily wooded. Near the center of campus are two gardens that attract over 300,000 visitors a year. The architecture of the original central campus, particularly the oldest buildings, are precast concrete and utilitarian-looking because they were built with limited state funds in the 1960s and 1970s. Starting in 2014, these buildings are being renovated to today's standards. Under the campus's third chancellor, James Woodward, the campus underwent major changes which continue today. The newest buildings, funded from state bonds, are being constructed in brick with neoclassical architecture. Concrete and asphalt sidewalks have largely been replaced by brick. The campus's road system is being upgraded to include landscaped medians and more trees.

The former Charlotte Research Institute (CRI) occupied the northern portion of the Main campus. The university retired the CRI branding in 2019, and its operations are now part of the Office of Research Partnerships.

=== Center City Campus ===
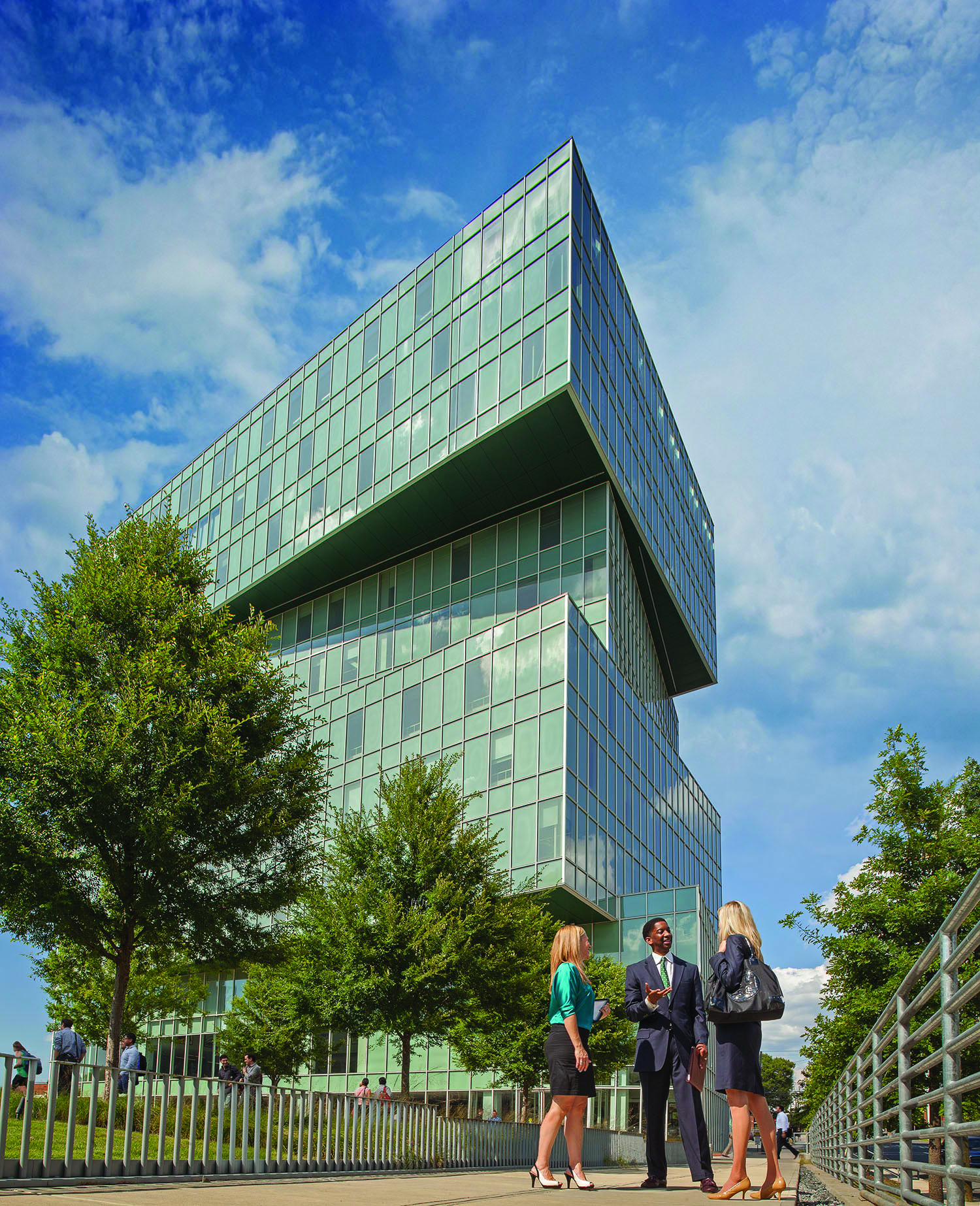
UNC Charlotte's Center City Campus is located on ninth Street in Uptown Charlotte. The building is home to a number of graduate-level programs in order to meet the needs of working professionals in the second largest financial city in America.

The second campus—named the Dubois Center at UNC Charlotte Center City—is in the first ward of Uptown Charlotte. This campus houses the School of Professional Studies along with 23 academic programs. Formerly located in the Mint Museum of Craft+Design, the Uptown campus moved into the $50.4 million Center City building at 320 East 9th Street, on August 22, 2011. It is located one block away from the 9th Street Station of the Lynx Blue Line. The 12-story, 143,000 square foot Center City building was designed by architectural firm KieranTimberlake. The building features cantilevered multi-story blocks which resemble a stack of books.

== Transportation ==
=== Charlotte Area Transit System ===
All UNC Charlotte students are automatically enrolled in the Charlotte Area Transit System (CATS) All-Access pass, which offers students unlimited rides to all of CATS transportation systems.

==== Light Rail ====
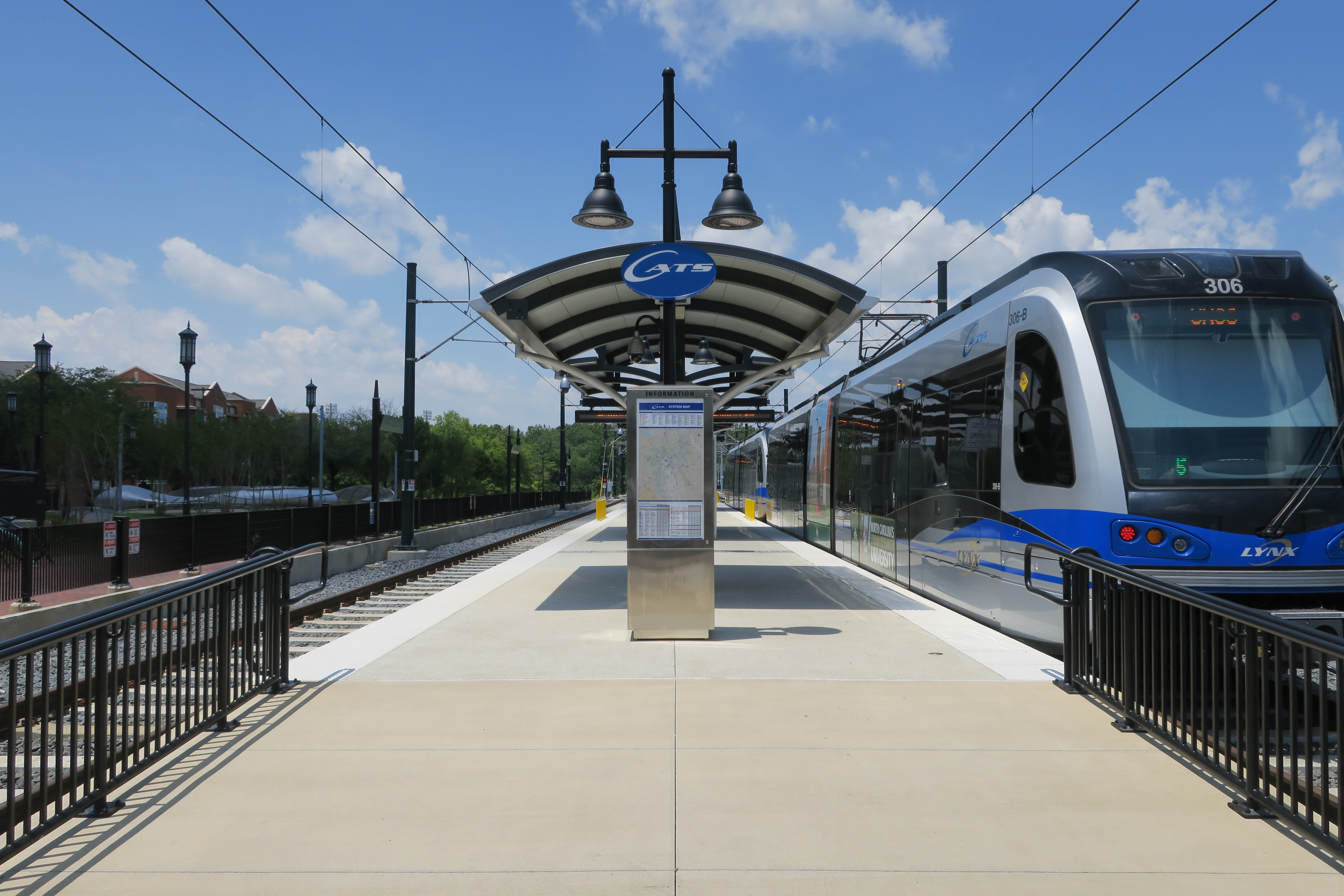

Added to UNC Charlotte's campus in 2018, the Lynx Blue Line connects students with 25 other stations off-campus, including the Charlotte Transportation Center, located in Uptown, where students can transfer to the CityLynx Gold Line, CATS buses, and the airport sprinter.

==== CATS Buses ====
CATS also offers bus services at UNC Charlotte. As of March 2025, CATS offers 2 bus routes, with route 29 stopping at various locations on-campus and route 22 stopping adjacent to the Engineering campus on JW Boulevard.

=== Niner Transit ===
On campus, students can catch one of 6 bus routes on campus. Green, Silver, Red Express, and Gold are operated daily by Academy Bus Lines, while the Greek Village and Shopping Shuttles are operated by UNC Charlotte's Parking and Transportation Services. Additionally, the university operates a prearranged ParaTransit service called Niner Rides.

Green and Silver buses operate every day of the week, while Red Express, Gold, and the Greek Village Shuttle run Monday through Friday. The Shopping Shuttle is only offered on Wednesday, Thursday, and Friday.

Route	Station		
Green	Light Rail	↔	North Deck
Silver	CRI Deck	↔	PORTAL
Red Express	Student Union East	↔	Football Stadium/Gate 1
Gold	Wallis Hall	↔	Student Union Deck
Greek Village Shuttle	Student Union West	↔	Student Union West
Shopping Shuttle	Levine Hall	↔	Harris Teeter
Niner Paratransit	Prearranged Service (54 stops)		

== Students ==
Undergraduate demographics as of Fall 2023
Race and ethnicity	Total
White	49%
Black	17%
Hispanic	15%
Asian	10%
Two or more races	5%
International student	2%
Unknown	2%
Economic diversity
Low-income (Note: The percentage of students who received an income-based federal Pell grant intended for low-income students.)	35%
Affluent (Note: The percentage of students who are a part of the American middle class at the bare minimum.)	65%

32,207 students were enrolled in the university in the fall of 2025. Students come from 99 of North Carolina's 100 counties, 50 states, and 128 countries.

== Academics ==
UNC Charlotte is classified among "R1: Very High Research Spending and Doctorate Production" The 2025 edition of the U.S. News & World Report Best Colleges ranked the university's undergraduate program 152nd overall among national universities, Forbes placed the university at 225 from among 500 nationwide.

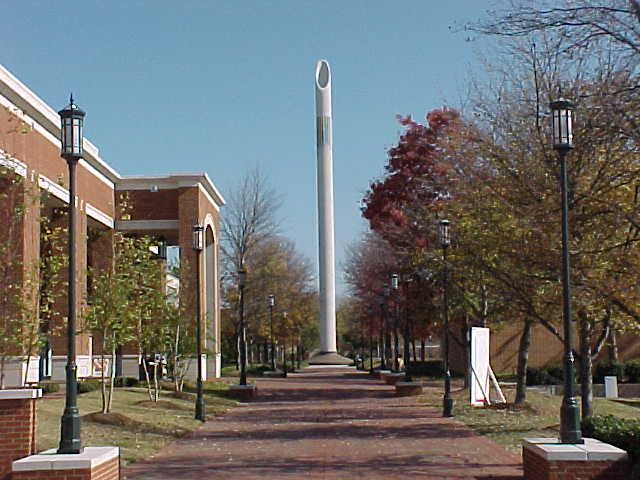
The Carillon and J. Murrey Atkins Library entrance on UNC Charlotte's main campus (left) and the Belk Tower (middle), which was torn down in 2016

Academic rankings

National
- Forbes: 225 from 500
- U.S. News & World Report: 143 (tie)
- Washington Monthly: 140 from 438

Global
- THE: 601-800
- U.S. News & World Report: 714 (tie)

Program rankings
USNWR	Rank
Engineering (undergraduate)	137
Social Mobility	63
Education (online Masters)	23
Curriculum & Instruction (online Masters)	17
Instructional Media (online Masters)	13
Special Education (online Masters)	10
Best Online Bachelors	4
Engineering (online Masters)	62
Nursing (online Masters)	37
Nursing Education (online Masters)	11
Part-Time MBA	69
Education-Masters	76
Engineering-Masters	152
Nursing-Masters	95
Nursing-Doctorate	110
Biological Sciences	175
Clinical Psychology	88
Computer Science	99
Healthcare Management	43
Mathematics	115
Nursing-Anesthesia	36
Physics	122
Public Affairs	49
Local Government Management	22
Public Health	70
Social Work	72
Statistics	70

=== Colleges and programs ===
The university offers 171 majors that lead to 79 baccalaureate (bachelor's degree) degrees, 66 master's degree programs, and 24 doctoral programs. Fifteen degree and certificate programs are offered via distance education, from 25% to 100% online.

The university is divided into ten colleges:

- College of Humanities & Earth and Social Sciences - academic disciplines including the humanities, social sciences, and environmental sciences
- Klein College of Science - focusing on mathematics and natural sciences
- College of Arts + Architecture - fine and performing arts (art, theater, dance, and music), as well as the School of Architecture, which is housed within the college
- Cato College of Education - the school of education
- College of Health and Human Services - social work, kinesiology, and athletic training; also contains the School of Nursing and programs like public health and health administration.
- William States Lee College of Engineering - engineering college with undergraduate and graduate programs in the following: civil and environmental engineering, mechanical engineering and engineering science, electrical and computer engineering, systems engineering and engineering management, construction management, and engineering technology
- College of Computing and Informatics - computer science, computer programming, health informatics, and bioinformatics; as of April 2021, the College of Computing and Informatics is the largest computing college in North Carolina — and the number 1 producer of computer science graduates in North Carolina, South Carolina, and Virginia.
- Belk College of Business - the business school, which offers undergraduate, graduate and executive education in five major departments: Accounting, Business Information Systems and Operations Management (BISOM), Economics, Finance, Management, and Marketing. The college offers three undergraduate degrees (Bachelor of Science in Accounting, Bachelor of Science in Business Administration, and Bachelor of Science in economics); five master's programs (Master of Business Administration, Master of Accountancy, Master of Science in Economics, Master of Science in Real Estate, and Master of Science in Mathematical Finance as well as a Professional Science Master's (PSM) program in Data Science and Business Analytics); a Doctorate in Business Administration and a Ph.D. in Business Administration concentrating in finance. The college was established in 1965, became the College of Business Administration in 1971, and was renamed the Belk College of Business in honor of the Belk family in 1990.
- University College - general education college for undergraduates who have not yet declared a major
- Honors College - a selective honors college that seeks to provide students with a liberal arts college experience
- Graduate School - graduate school; works with the undergraduate colleges to organize the master's and doctoral degree programs

=== Scholarships ===
In 2009, UNC Charlotte received the largest single donation from a private source, when The Leon Levine Family Foundation donated $9.3 million to the university to form the Levine Scholars program. The scholarship program, named for Leon and Sandra Levine, provides a four-year scholarship to UNC Charlotte. The scholarship includes tuition, fees, books, room, four summer experiences, and an $8,000 grant for community service initiatives.

In addition to the Levine Scholars, the university offers eleven other merit-based scholarship programs.

=== Library system ===
UNC Charlotte's J. Murrey Atkins Library, named for the first chairman of the Board of Trustees of Charlotte College, has over 3.3 million volumes, including 930,000 e-books, over 400 databases, and approximately 75,000 journals, the vast majority available electronically, as well as an area for special collections. The recently renovated library includes a ten-story tower that accentuates the library's place at the heart of UNC Charlotte's campus. In April 2007, Atkins received its one-millionth volume, a copy of T. S. Eliot's The Waste Land. A special collections section is housed on the tenth floor at the top of the library.

== Athletics ==
The nickname of the athletic teams are the 49ers, indicative of the fact that UNC Charlotte (then Charlotte College) was saved from permanent closure in 1949. The mascot is "Norm the Niner", a gold miner. The school's colors are green and white; gold and black are both featured in the logo and frequently used in the uniforms of several sports.

For athletics purposes, the school is known as simply "Charlotte", a change made official by the athletic department on August 23, 2000. The athletic department sponsors nineteen varsity teams and competes in the NCAA's Division I. The university is a full member of American Conference following the 2022-23 calendar season. On September 18, 2008, Chancellor Dubois recommended adding a Division I FCS football program to UNC Charlotte. On November 13, 2008, the UNC Charlotte Board of Trustees voted 8–0 in favor of adding football to the university.

=== Baseball ===
Charlotte Baseball has made six NCAA Tournament appearances with the most recent coming in 2021. The 49ers have four conference tournament championships, and eight regular season conference championships. Baseball alums with Major League experience include Bryan Harvey (Angels), Jeff Johnson (Yankees), Chris Haney (Kansas City Royals), John Maine (New York Mets), Jason Stanford (Cleveland Indians). Fieldin Culbreth is a recently retired MLB umpire who worked the 2008 World Series.

=== Basketball (men's) ===
Men's basketball, coached by Aaron Fearne. The team has reached the NCAA Tournament 11 times, including a trip to the Final Four in 1977. NBA players that once suited up for the 49ers include Boston Celtics Cedric Maxwell, DeMarco Johnson, 2001 NBA draft lottery pick Rodney White, Eddie Basden and Chad Kinch of the Cleveland Cavaliers.

=== Basketball (women's) ===
In 2003, the women's basketball team reached the NCAA Tournament for the first time. In the 2021–22 season, the team won both a CUSA regular season and tournament championship, resulting in an NCAA tournament berth.

=== Football ===
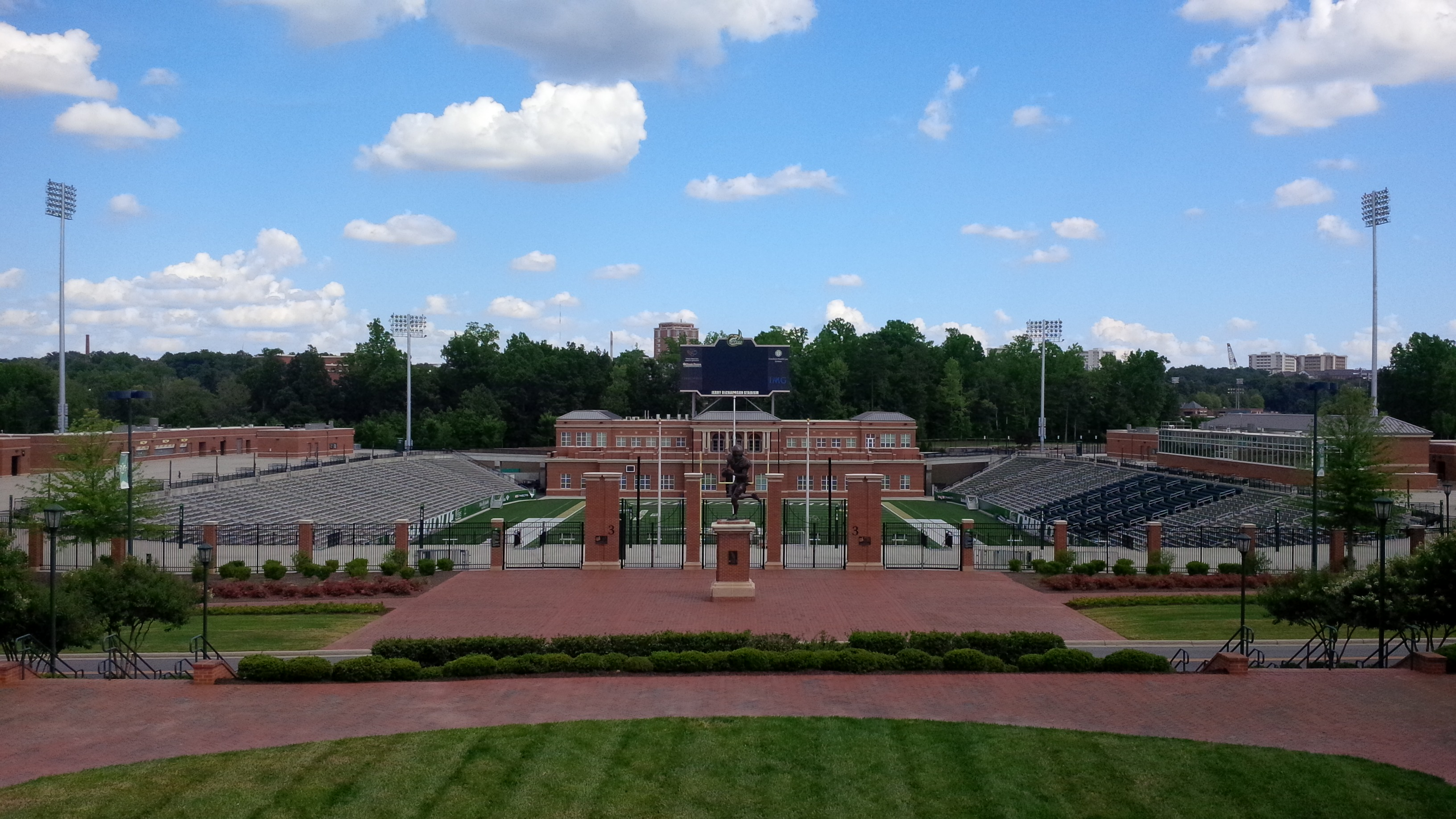
Entrance 3 of Jerry Richardson Stadium on the campus of UNC Charlotte

Charlotte's Division I FCS football team kicked off in 2013. It plays at Jerry Richardson Stadium, which holds approximately 15,000 people and can be expanded to hold up to 40,000 people. Its first game was a 52–7 victory against Campbell University on August 31, 2013.

The football program moved up to Division I FBS in 2015 to play as members of Conference USA. The Charlotte 49ers participated in their first bowl game in 2019 against the Buffalo Bulls in the Bahamas Bowl. Charlotte would move conferences to the American Athletic Conference beginning in 2023.

Charlotte has had 5 players selected in the NFL Draft; Larry Ogunjobi, Nate Davis, Alex Highsmith, Cameron Clark and Grant DuBose.

=== Golf (men's) ===
In September 2007, the Charlotte men's golf team reached the ranking of being the top-rated golf team in the nation.

=== Soccer (men's) ===
The men's soccer team reached the College Cup in 1996 and 2011. The team advanced all the way to the 2011 NCAA Division I Men's Soccer Championship, losing to UNC-Chapel Hill and finishing second in the national polls. Former 49ers soccer players who went on to play in the MLS include Floyd Franks, Donnie Smith, Brandt Bronico, and Jon Busch.

The team has won eight conference titles, including once in 2013–2014 as a member of Conference USA and twice in 2023-2024 and 2024–2025 as a member of the American Athletic Conference. The program became the first in the American since SMU in 2017, 2018, and 2019 to win back-to-back conference championships.

== Student organizations ==
There are a large number of student organizations associated with the university. Their focuses include academic, graduate, honor societies, interest, international, multicultural, political, religious, service, secret societies, and sports. UNC Charlotte also boasts a diverse Greek life, with over 10 sororities and 14 fraternities serving the campus community.

== Notable alumni and faculty ==
Every graduate of UNC Charlotte automatically becomes a member of the Alumni Association, an organization of more than 147,000 former students whose primary purpose is to advance the interests of the university. There are no membership fees or annual dues, but there is an expectation that members will be active participants in the organization. In addition to promoting the interests of UNC Charlotte, the Alumni Association acts as a network of UNC Charlotte graduates who assist each other in their personal, professional and social development, and recognize and cheer the accomplishments of their fellow members. The association offers members a number of benefits and services. Some are in the form of information and communications, including a UNC Charlotte magazine and a quarterly electronic newsletter which keeps alumni up to date on news from the association and the university. The only requirement for membership is that alumni maintain contact with the Office of Alumni Affairs, provide an up-to-date address for alumni files, and keep the association informed about their personal progress and career achievements.

== See also ==
- Dale F. Halton Arena
- Lee Rose
- Jeff Mullins
- Bobby Lutz
