= Campus of Virginia Tech =

College campus in Blacksburg, Virginia, US

Virginia Tech Campus
- Motto: Ut Prosim (Latin)
- Location: 37.225°N 80.425°W
- Colors: Chicago maroon and Burnt orange
- Mascot: HokieBird
- Website: www.vt.edu

The main part of the campus of Virginia Tech is located in Blacksburg, Virginia; the central campus is roughly bordered by Prices Fork Road to the northwest, Plantation Road to the west, Main Street to the east, and U.S. Route 460 bypass to the south, although it also has several thousand acres beyond the central campus. The Virginia Tech campus consists of 130 buildings on approximately 2,600 acres (1,100 hectares). It was the site of the Draper's Meadow massacre in 1755 during the French and Indian War.

== Main Campus academic buildings ==
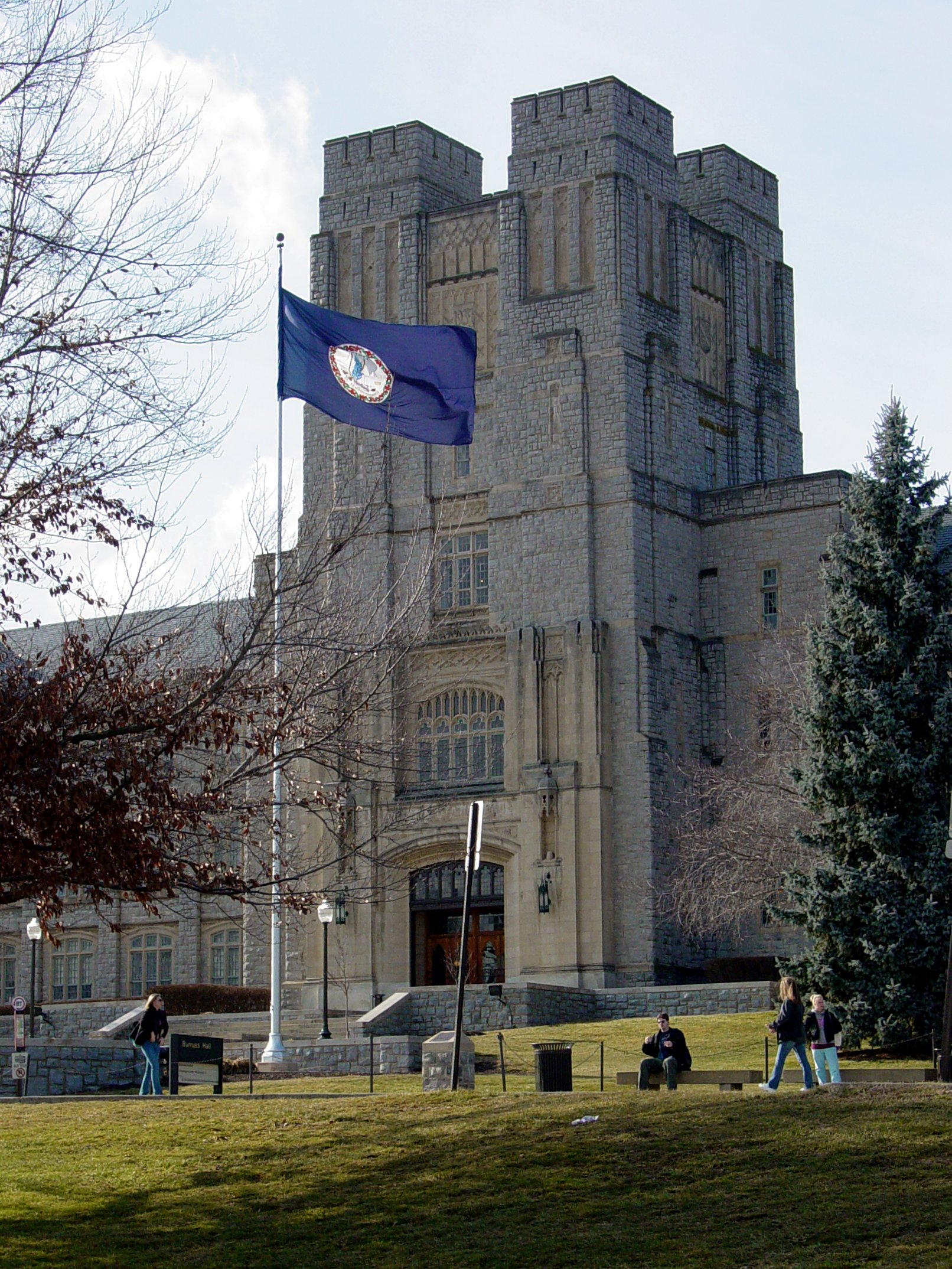
Burruss Hall, the main administration building and iconic symbol of the Virginia Tech Blacksburg campus

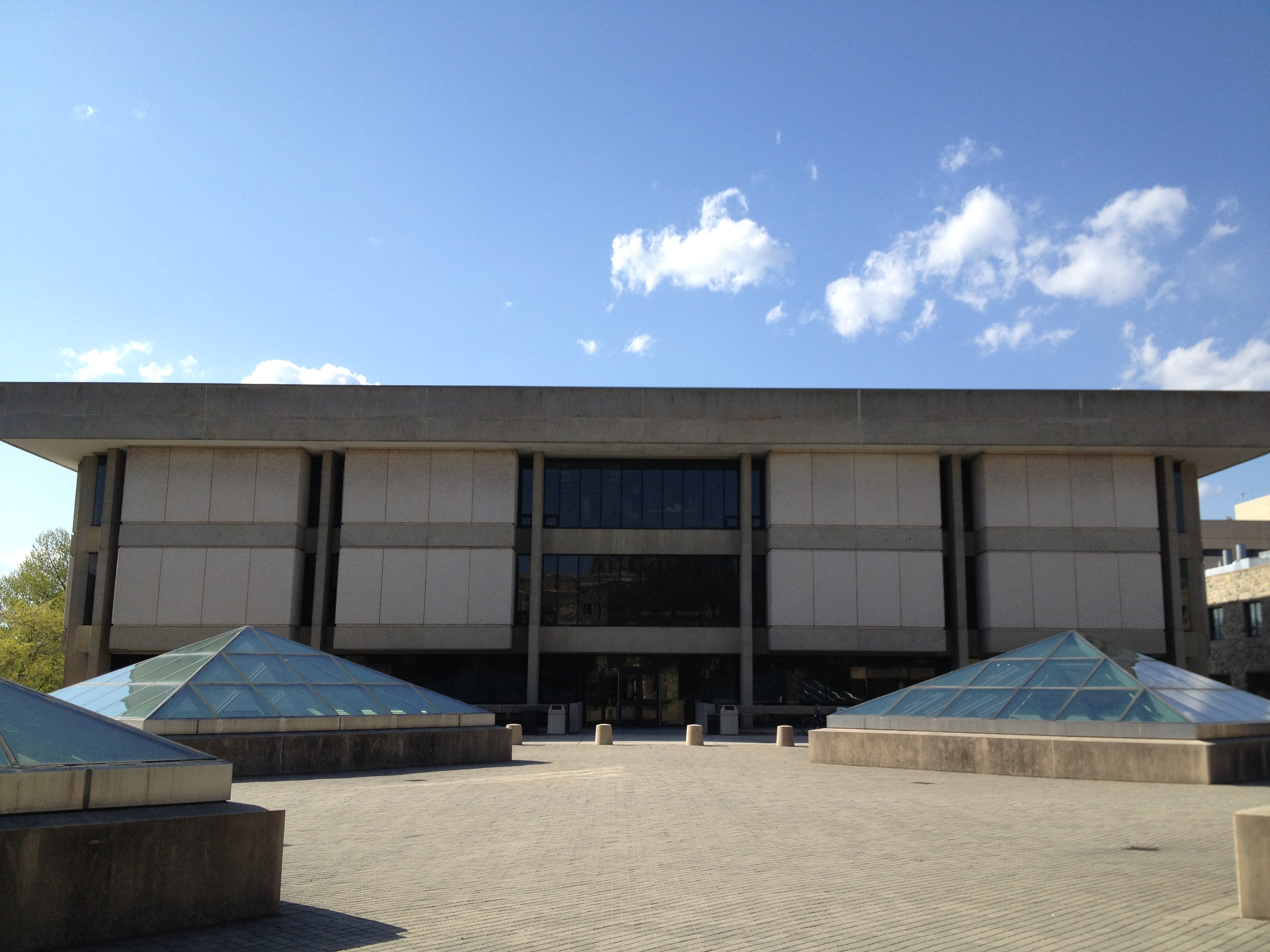
Cowgill Hall with Burchard Hall in the foreground

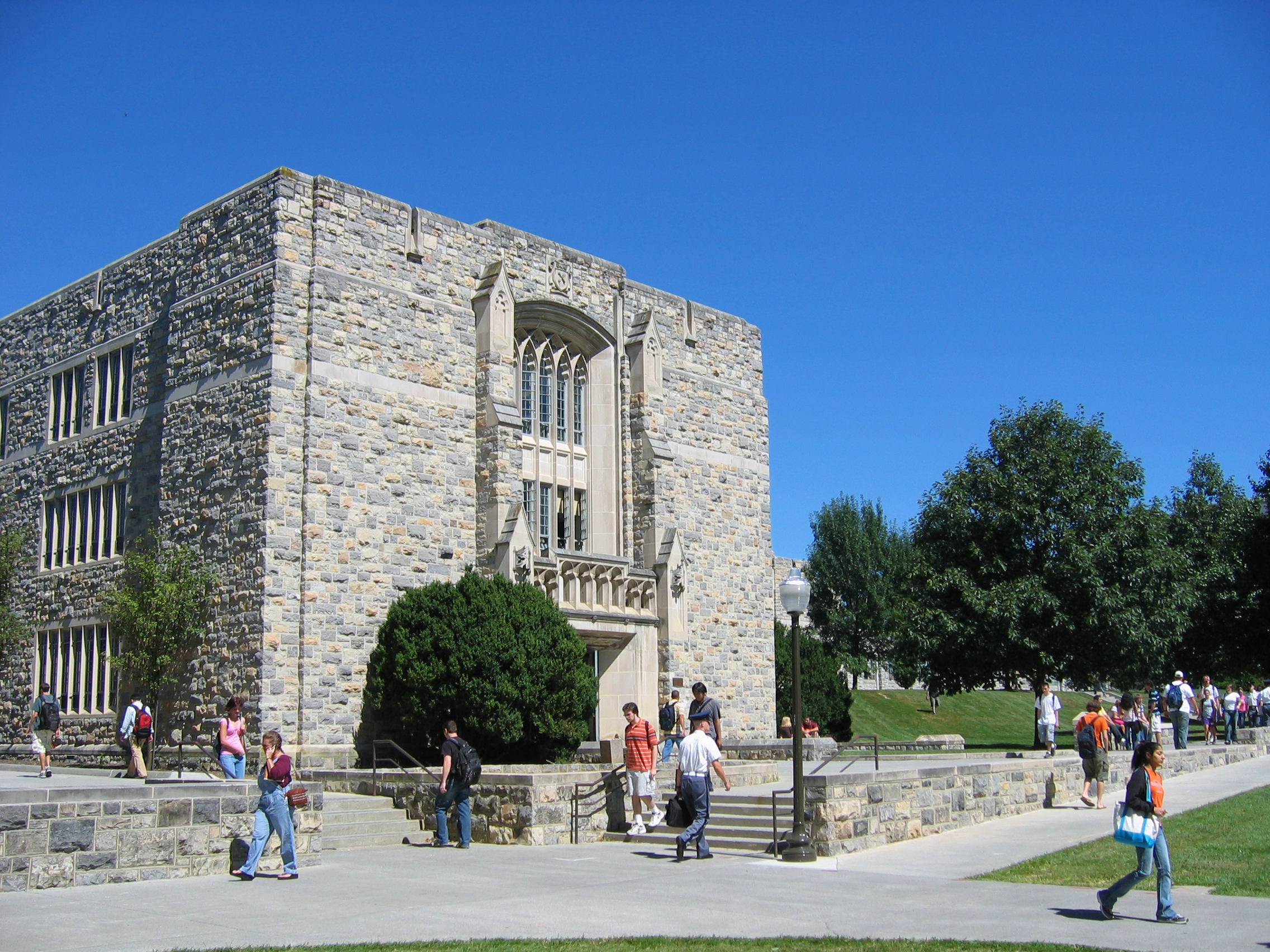
Norris Hall

=== Agnew Hall ===
Originally known as the Home Economics Building, Agnew Hall was constructed in 1940 at a cost of $42,525. In 1949 it was named in honor of Ella Graham Agnew, the first woman to receive a field appointment from the U.S. Department of Agriculture. The building is used primarily by the College of Agriculture and Life Sciences. In 2009, a $1.6 million renovation took place which added lab space to the first floor for the Department of Biological Systems Engineering.

=== Bishop-Favrao Hall ===
Bishop-Favrao Hall is home to the Department of Building Construction, which is under the College of Architecture and Urban Studies (CAUS), and the Myers-Lawson School of Construction. Much of the building has its systems exposed so that students can see them and learn about the systems. Bishop-Favrao was completed in December 2007 and is named after Richard Bishop and William Favrao, the Department of Building Construction's founder and department head until 1977.

=== Burchard Hall ===
Constructed in 1998 and named after Charles Burchard, the founding dean of the College of Architecture and Urban Studies between 1964 and 1979, Burchard Hall provides studio space for students in the architecture and industrial design programs. The building also provides office and classroom spaces as well as specialized studio space. Burchard Hall is actually constructed underground and has four pyramidal skylights that illuminate the studio spaces below. One can access Burchard Hall via either of the three access portals on the "roof", or through the ground-floor entrances. Burchard Hall also has a walkway connecting it to the nearby Cowgill Hall.

=== Burruss Hall ===
Constructed in 1936 facing the center of the drill field and originally known as the Teaching and Administration Building, Burruss Hall is the main administration building on campus and the iconic symbol of Virginia Tech. A west wing and rear addition were built in 1968, and an east wing was added in 1970. It contains a 3,003-seat auditorium, a venue where major events such as commencement, presidential speeches, concerts, and performing arts shows are held. Additionally, the first floor of the building houses faculty offices, studios and classrooms for the College of Architecture and Urban Studies. The building is named for the eighth president of Virginia Tech, Julian Ashby Burruss.

=== Cowgill Hall ===
Cowgill Hall, located on Perry Street, is the home of Virginia Tech's College of Architecture and Urban Studies. It was completed in 1969 and is named for Clinton Harriman Cowgill, who retired in 1956 after 28 years as the architecture department head.

In 2006 Cowgill Hall was named the winner of the Virginia Society of the American Institute of Architects Test of Time Award. This award is presented annually to a building that has served the same function for at least 25 years.

=== Davidson Hall ===
Davidson Hall contains office space, teaching labs, and classrooms. Originally constructed in 1928, additions to the structure were completed in 1933 and 1938; the structure was also renovated between 1964 and 1965. Named in honor of Robert James Davidson, the Dean of the Department of Applied Sciences, it was the department home for the Department of Chemistry. Davidson was a fellow of the American Association for the Advancement of Science, a member of the Washington Academy of Science, a member of the American Chemical Society, and served as the President of the National Association of Official Agricultural Chemists, in 1903. Davidson was also a delegate to the International Congress of Applied Chemistry at London, in 1909.

In 2012 a $31 million renovation of Davidson Hall broke ground. When completed, Davidson Hall will have modern research laboratories, office space, new classrooms, and a 300-person auditorium. As of May 2014, substantial completion was expected in May 2014.

=== Derring Hall ===
Derring Hall, a five-story building, was constructed in 1969 and contains offices, classroom space, and laboratories for primarily the biological sciences and geosciences programs at Virginia Tech. The building was named after Paul Neyron Derring, a popular administrator with the students, who was stricken blind at the age of thirteen. Derring served on the State Commission for the Visually Handicapped and served on the Blacksburg Town Council.

=== Durham Hall ===
Durham Hall, a $16 million project, opened in 1998 and was called "New Engineering Building", or "The NEB", until 2001. It was named in honor of Fred D. Durham, co-founder of the Dover Corporation, a Fortune 500 manufacturing company located in New York City.

=== Norris Hall ===
Norris Hall is a four-story (one floor below grade) Hokie Stone academic building located between Burruss and Holden Halls. The two wings of the building, built in 1960 and 1962, encompass approximately 70,000 gross square feet (6,500 square meters) and house the main office for the Department of Engineering Science and Mechanics, room 219, and used to house the Dean's Office for the College of Engineering, room 333, The building has been home to the Department of Engineering Science and Mechanics, room 223, for almost fifty years, and is named for Earl Bertram Norris, who served as dean of engineering for twenty-four years between 1928 and 1952.

Norris Hall was also the location of the second shooting attack during the Virginia Tech shootings on April 16, 2007. The building was the site of 31 of the 33 fatalities (including the gunman), and all 17 wounded faculty and students. The building was closed for the rest of the 2007 spring semester, and reopened with access limited to faculty and students with legitimate business inside at remaining offices and laboratories on June 18, 2007. On December 20, 2007, it was announced that the second floor of Norris would be renovated and become home to the Center for Peace Studies and Violence Prevention.

On April 10, 2009, a ceremony was held to commemorate the reopening of the west wing of Norris Hall. The area consists of six reconfigured rooms and laboratories and is home to the new Center for Peace Studies and Violence Prevention as well as the Department of Engineering Science and Mechanics. The renovation project was completed in March 2009 at a cost of approximately one million dollars; many goods and services were donated by individuals and contractors in support of the project. As department head of Engineering Science and Mechanics, Dr. Ishwar Puri played a leading role in the reoccupation of Norris Hall where his department is housed. Among other roles, he spoke at the April 10 ceremony.

=== Military Building ===
Originally constructed in 1936 and renovated in 1998, the Military Building is located on the Upper Quad. It is the base of operations for the Virginia Tech Rescue Squad and home to the Army, Navy, and Air Force ROTC programs. It also houses the College of Engineering's Joseph F. Ware, Jr. Advanced Engineering Lab.

==== Joseph F. Ware, Jr. Advanced Engineering Lab ====
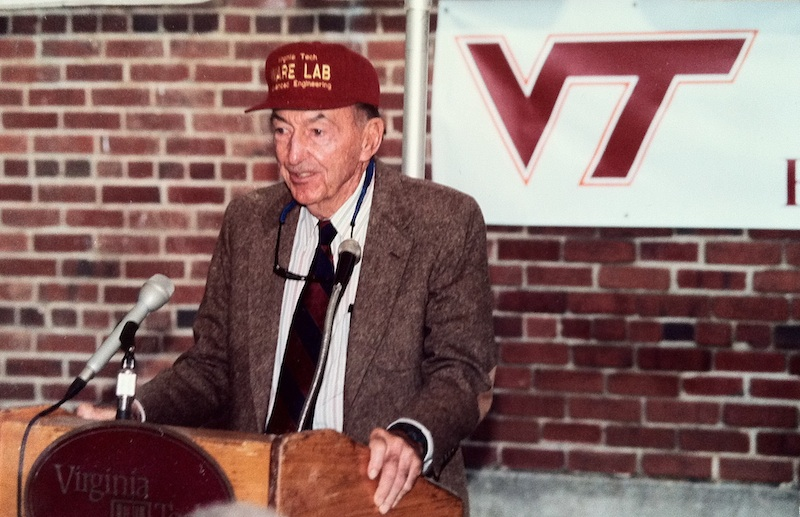
Joseph F. Ware, Jr.

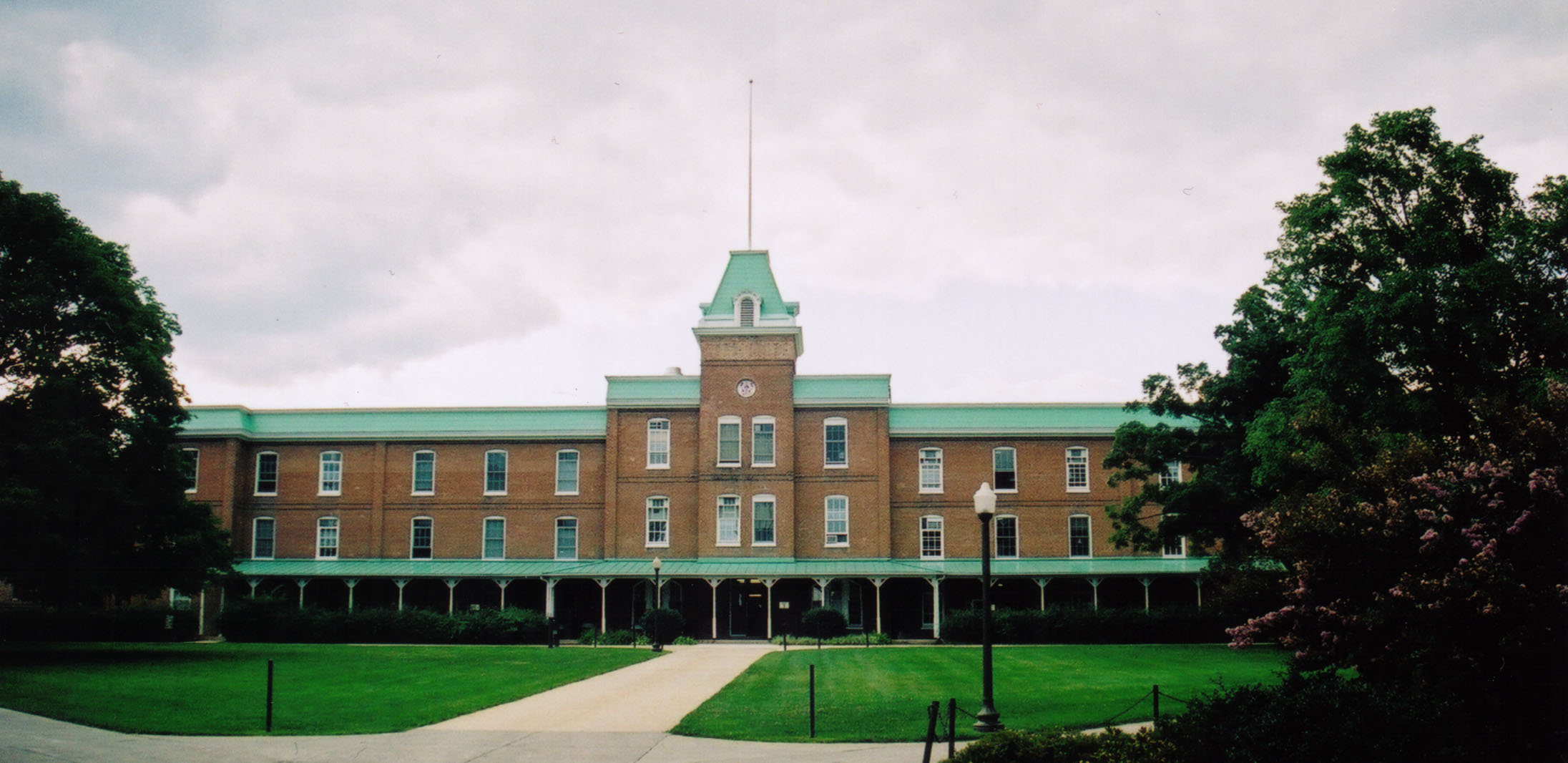
Lane Hall was added to the National Register of Historic Places in 2015.

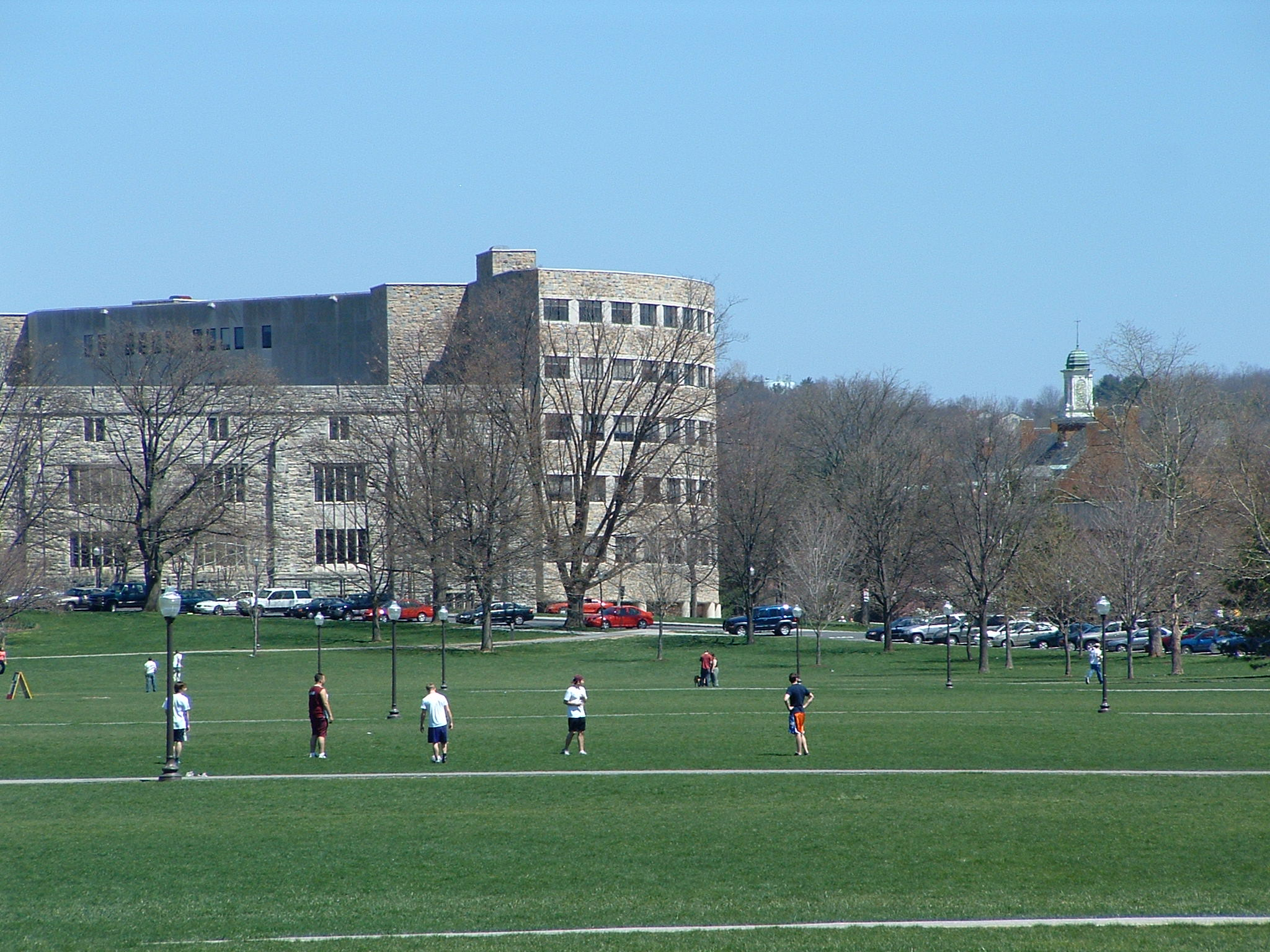
The Drillfield looking towards Newman Library

Work began on the Joseph F. Ware, Jr. Advanced Engineering Lab (Ware Lab) in 1997, in a collaboration of Joseph F. Ware, Jr., his wife Jennifer "Jenna" Ware, MSW, LCSW, ATP/CFI, and Hayden Griffin, Ph.D. of Virginia Tech., and the Ware Lab was opened September 4, 1998. The Lab is named after its founder and 1937 Mechanical Engineering Alumnus Joseph F. Ware, Jr. As a part of the College of Engineering, the Ware Lab is home to many student-based research and design projects. Focused on a hands-on-learning environment, students are encouraged to participate in these projects as early as their freshman year. The Klages Machine Shop is also located within the Ware Lab and is equipped with various machine tools used for project manufacturing, including two Numerical Control (CNC) Machines. The lab is home to such notable teams as the Hybrid Electric Vehicle Team, Formula SAE (VT Motorsports), BOLT all electric motorcycle team and the Baja SAE team. Other teams in the lab include AISC Steel Bridge (SBT), Design Build Fly (DBF), and the Autonomous Aerial Vehicle Team (AAVT).

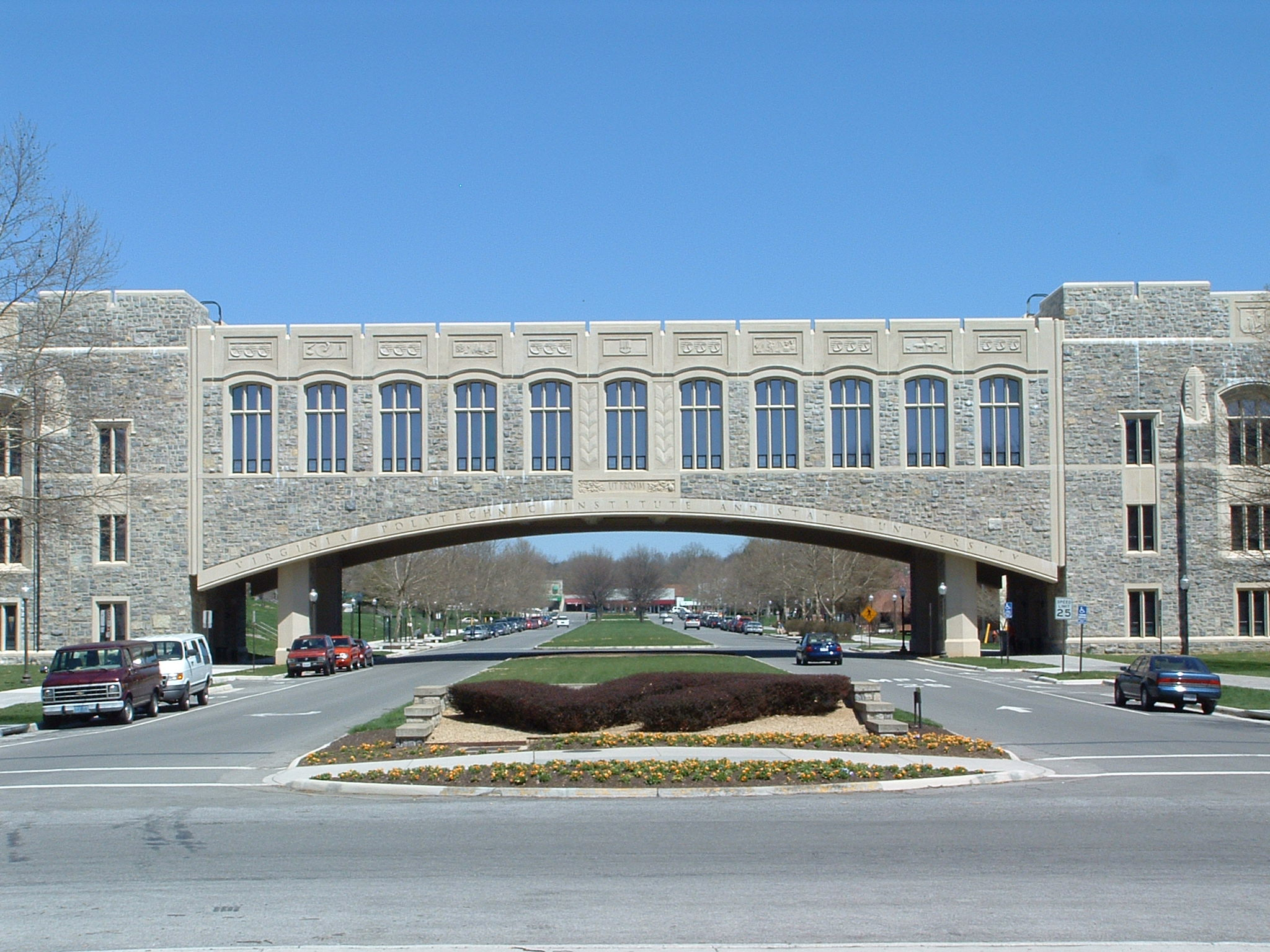
Torgersen Bridge on Alumni Mall

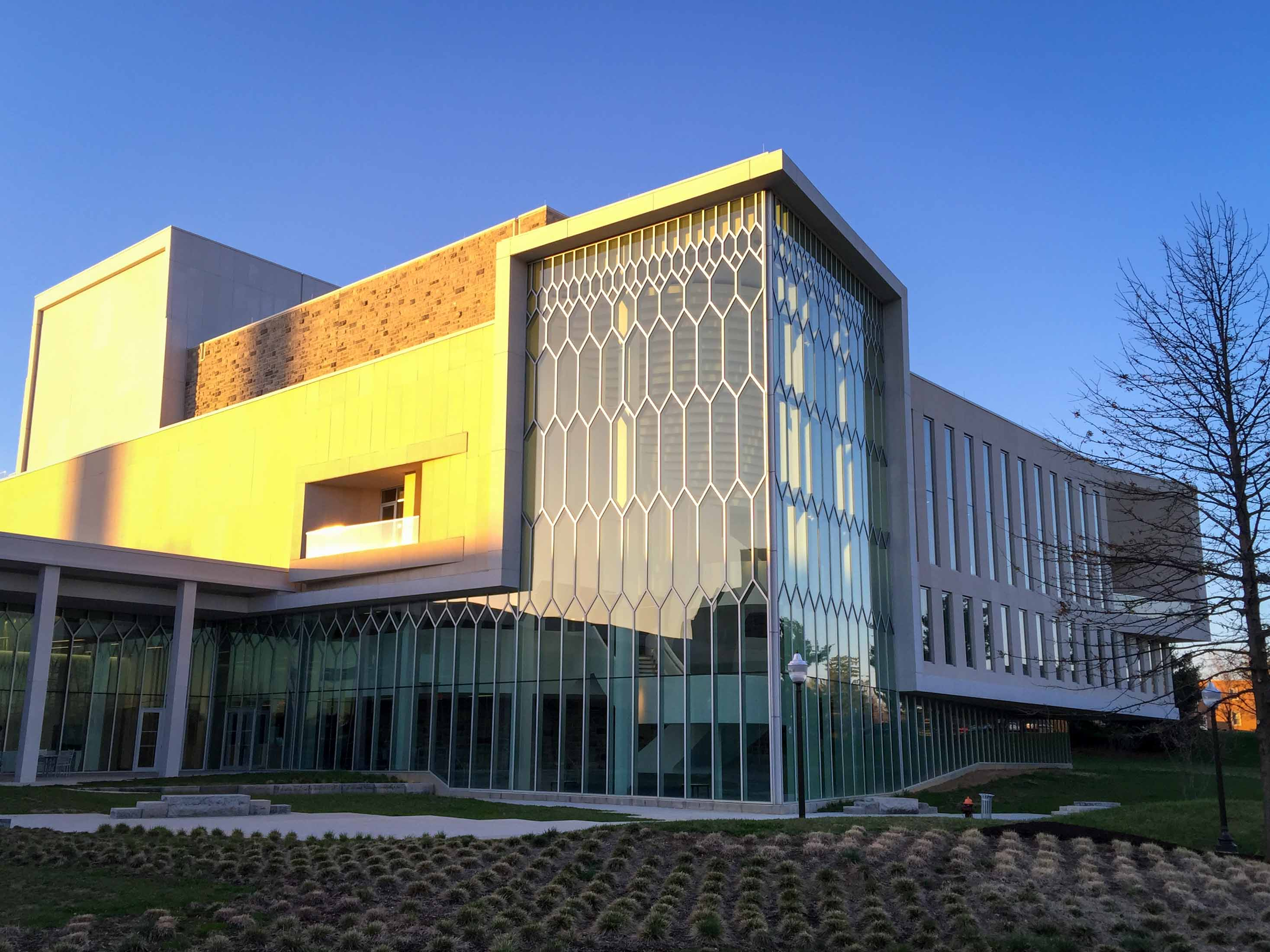
Moss Arts Center

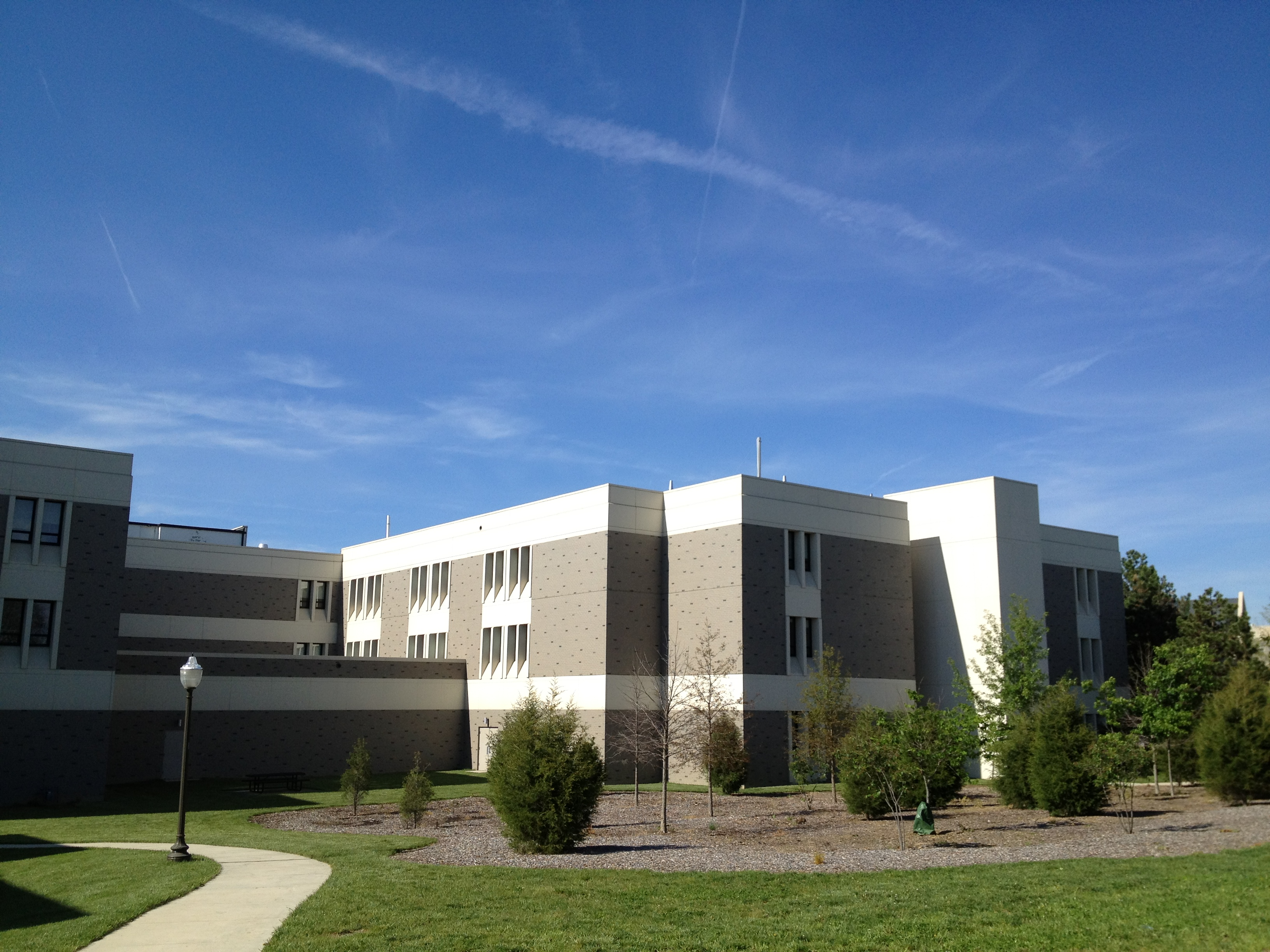
Litton-Reaves Hall contains classrooms and labs for the Department of Animal and Poultry Sciences

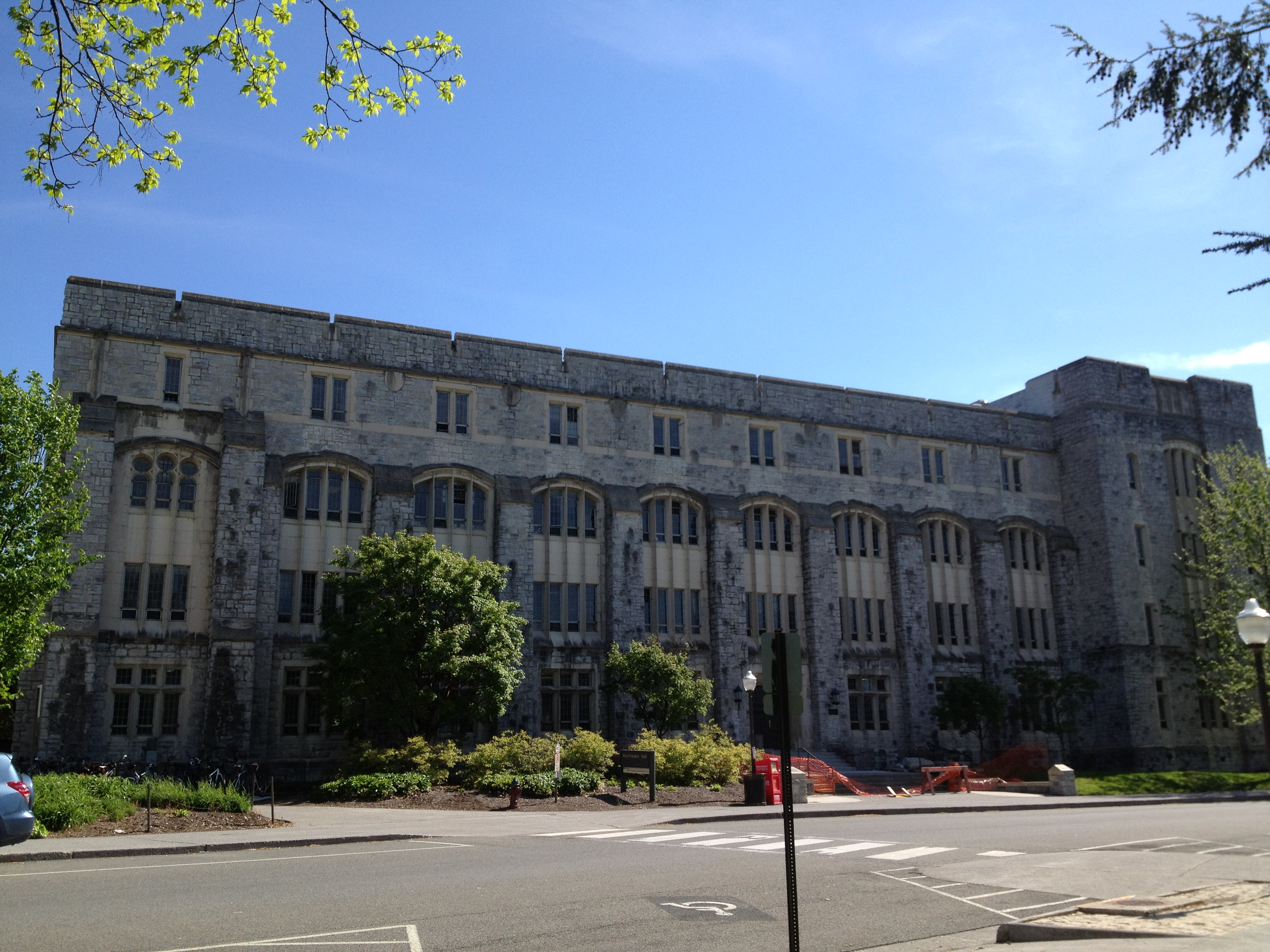
Hutcheson Hall houses offices and classrooms

=== Other academic buildings ===
Other academic buildings on the Blacksburg campus:

- Art and Design Learning Center
- Cheatham Hall
- Dairy Science Complex
- Engel Hall (formerly the Biochemistry Building)
- Femoyer Hall
- Food Science and Technology
- Fralin Biotechnology Center
- Goodwin Hall (formerly 'Signature Engineering Building')
- Hahn Hall (formerly Chemistry/Physics)
- Hancock Hall
- Holden Hall
- Hutcheson Hall
- Lane Hall (formerly Barracks No. 1)
- Liberal Arts Building (formerly the YMCA building)
- Litton Reaves Hall (formerly the Animal Sciences Building)
- Major Williams Hall
- McBryde Hall
- Newman Library
- Pamplin Hall (formerly Commerce Hall)
- Patton Hall
- Price Hall (formerly Agricultural Hall)
- Randolph Hall
- Robeson Hall
- Sandy Hall (formerly the Extension Division Building)
- Saunders Hall (formerly the Dairy Science Building)
- Seitz Hall (formerly the Agricultural Engineering Building)
- Shanks Hall
- Smyth Hall (formerly the Natural Science Building)
- Theatre 101
- Torgersen Hall
- Virginia-Maryland Regional College of Veterinary Medicine
- Wallace Hall
- Whittemore Hall
- Williams Hall (formerly the Academic Science Building)

=== Blacksburg academic facilities ===
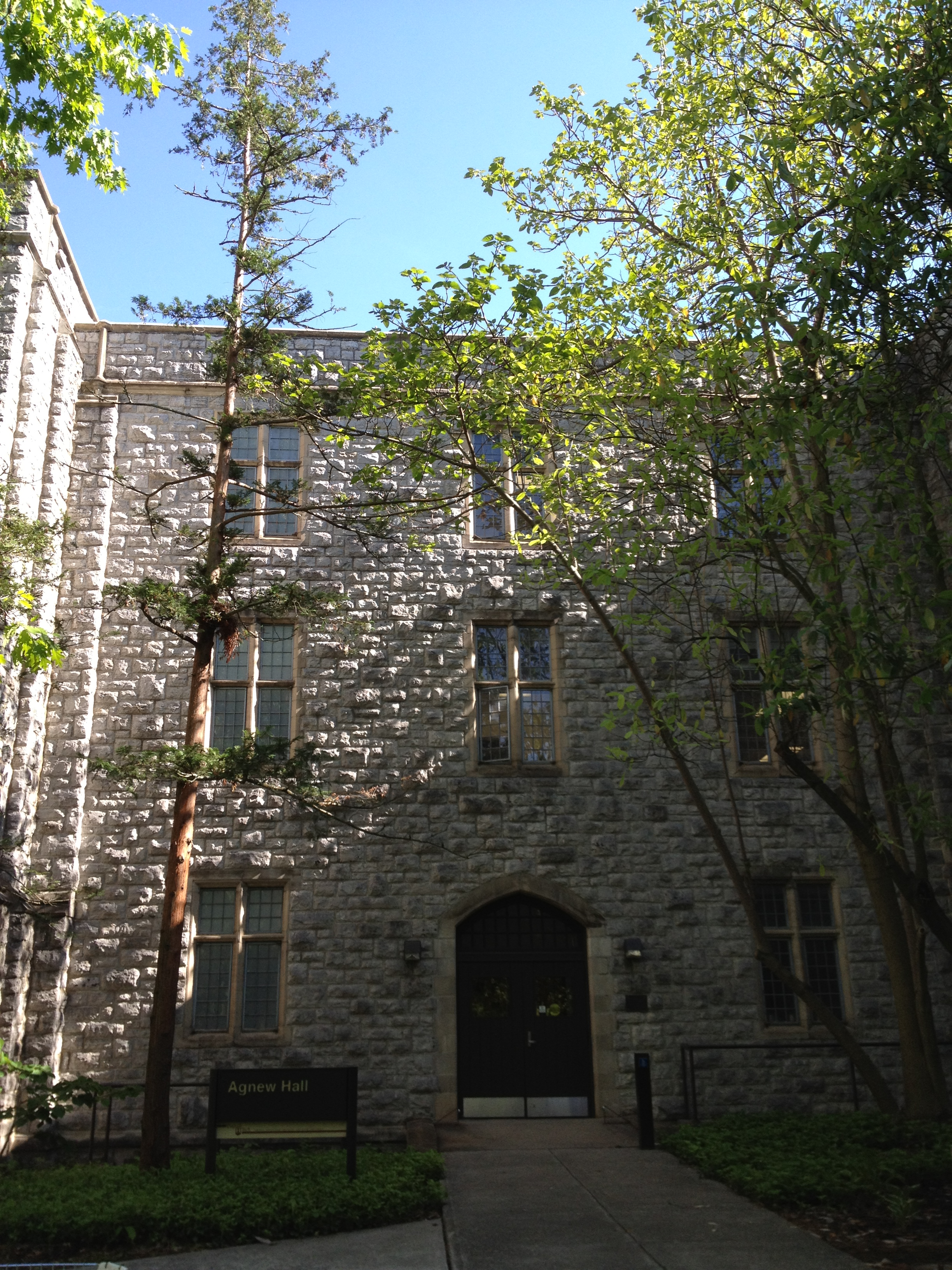
Agnew Hall

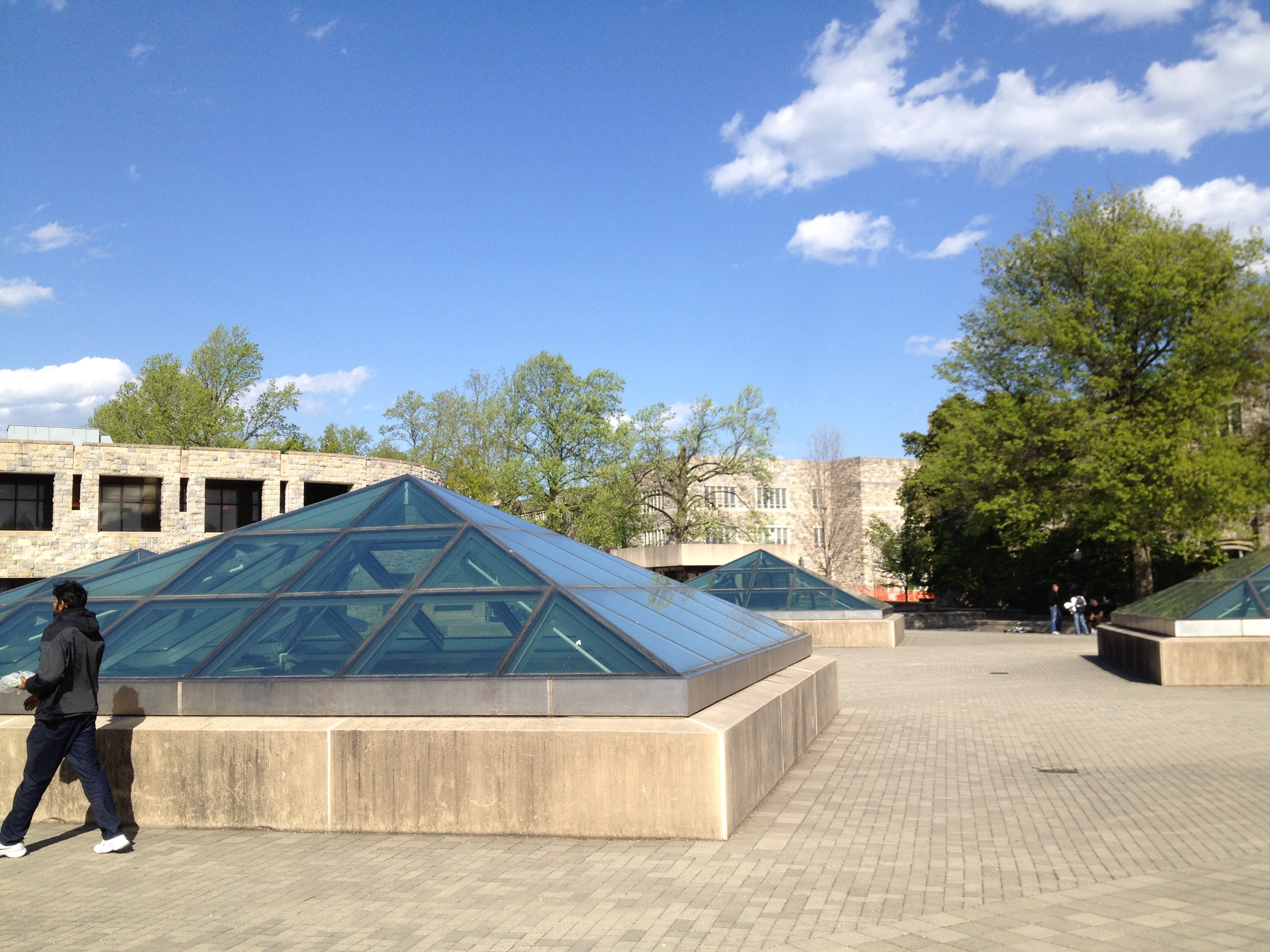
Burchard Hall

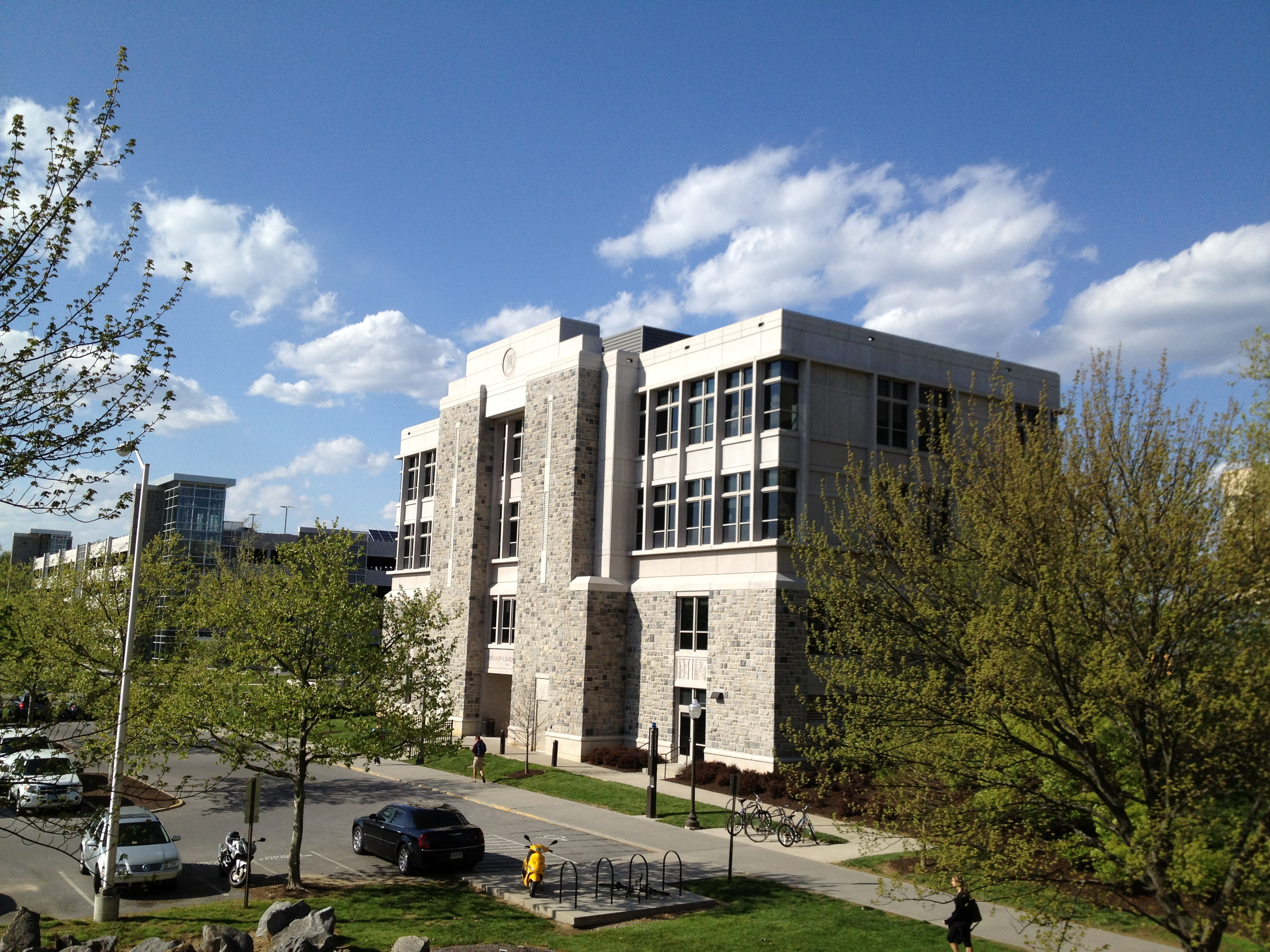
Bishop-Favrao Hall

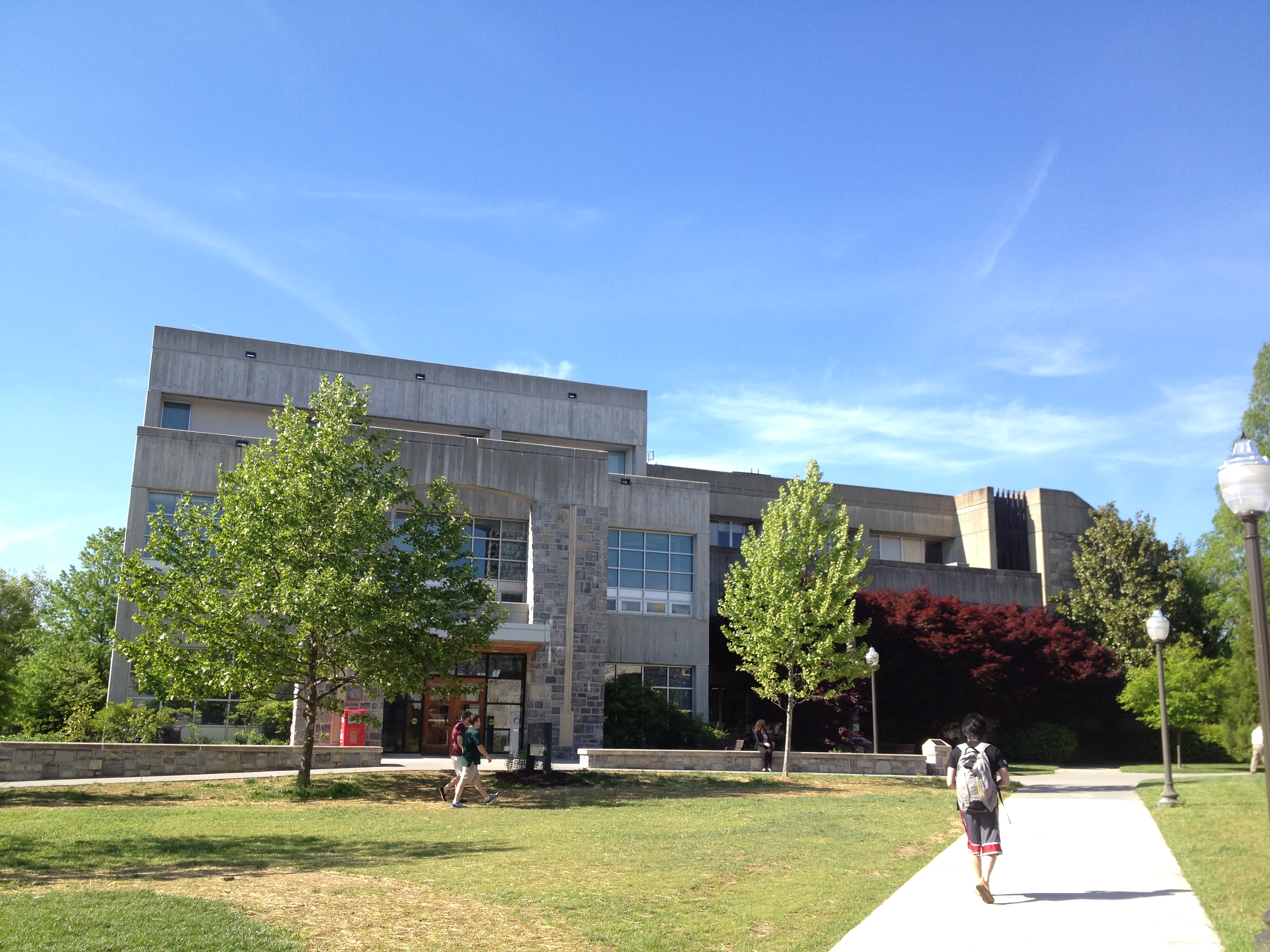
Cheatham Hall

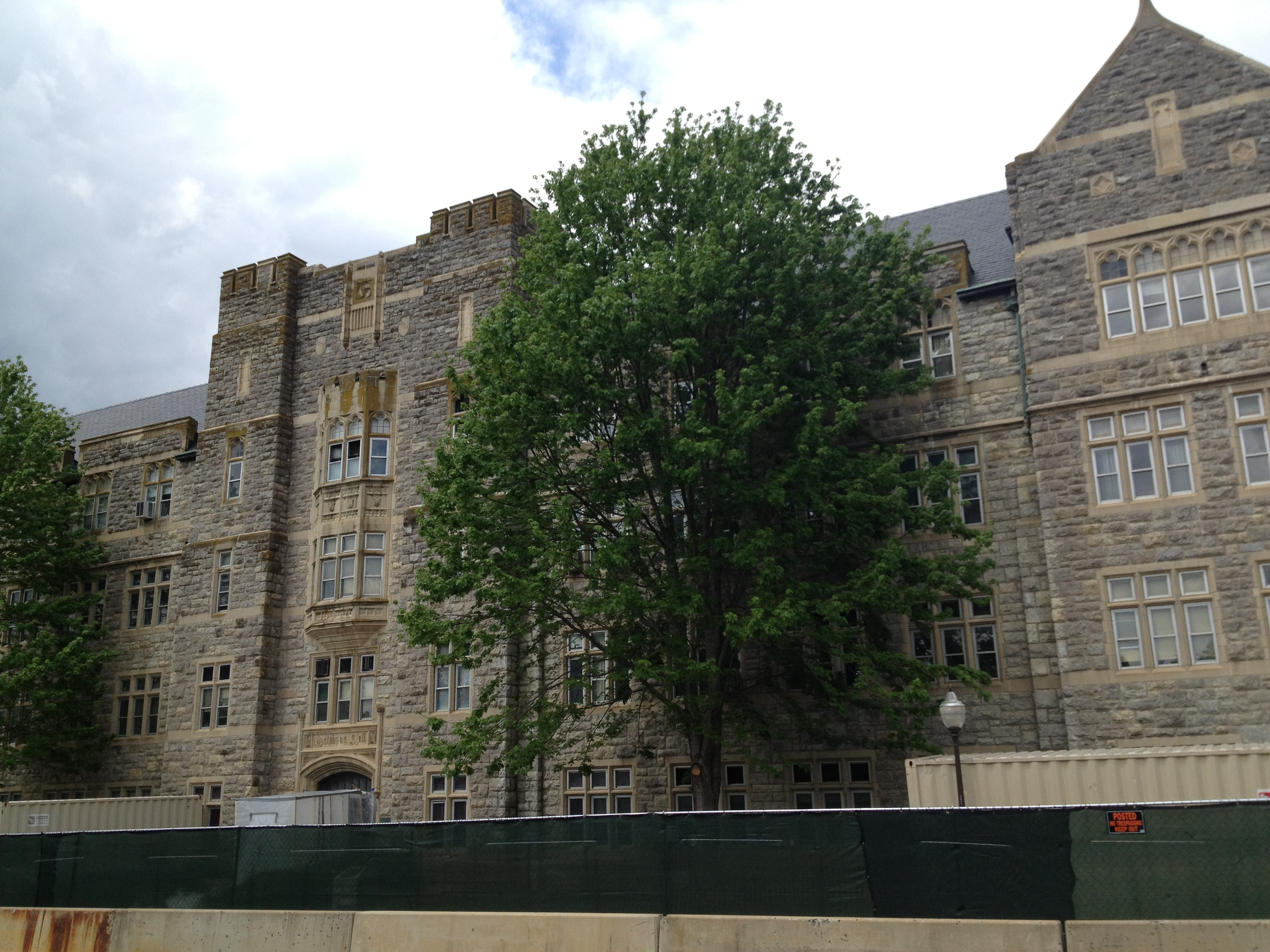
Davidson Hall

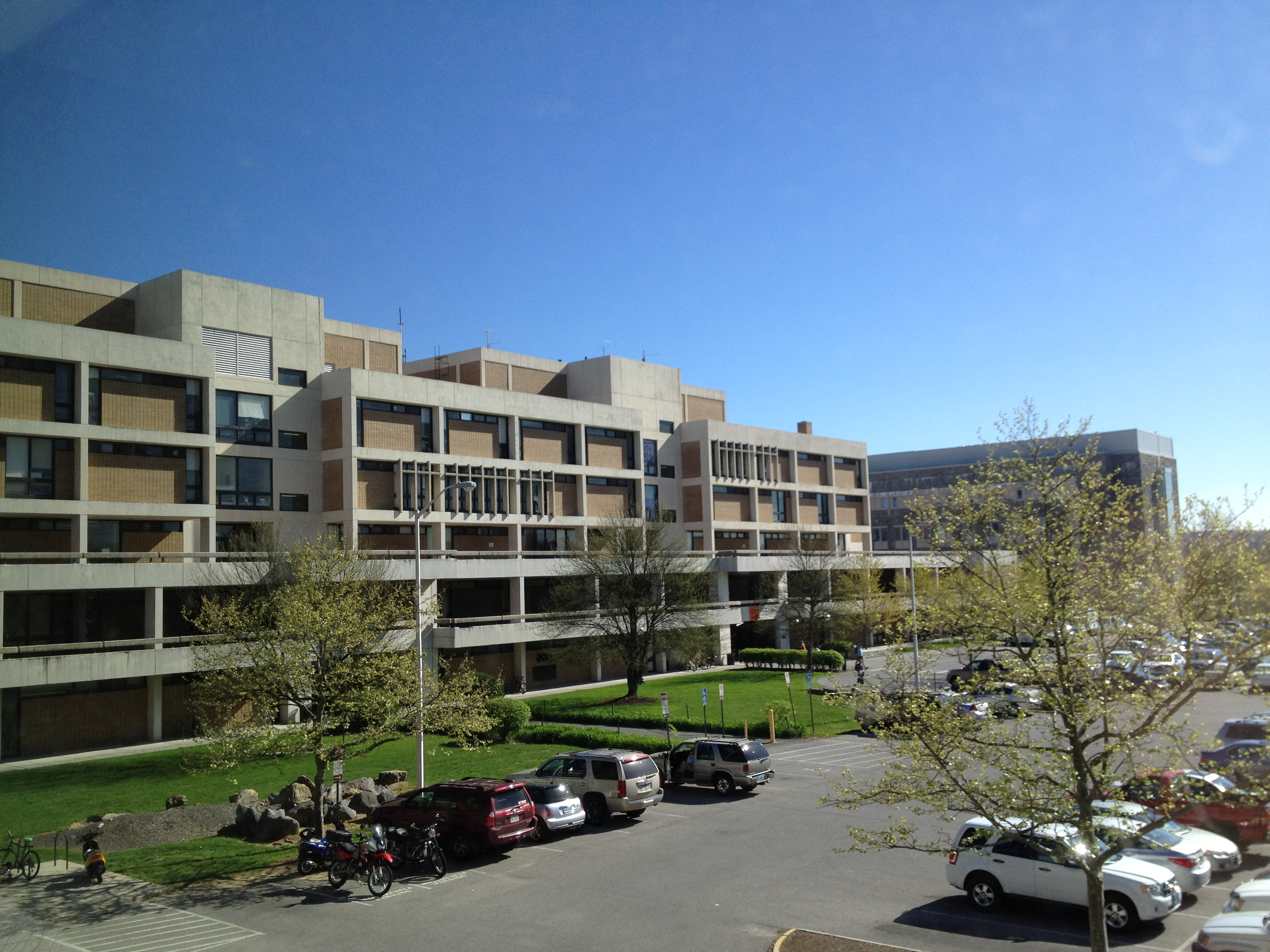
Derring Hall

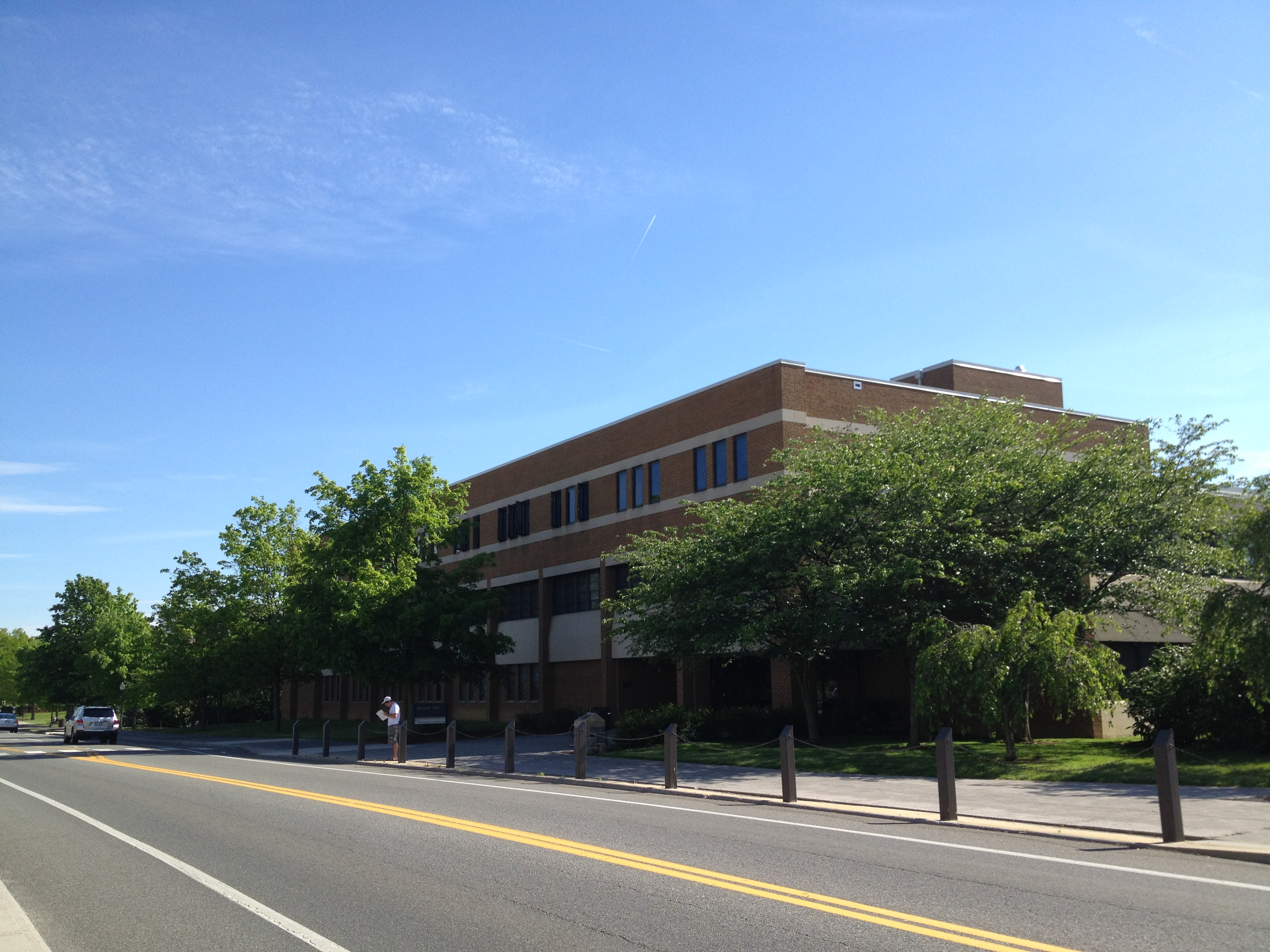
Wallace Hall

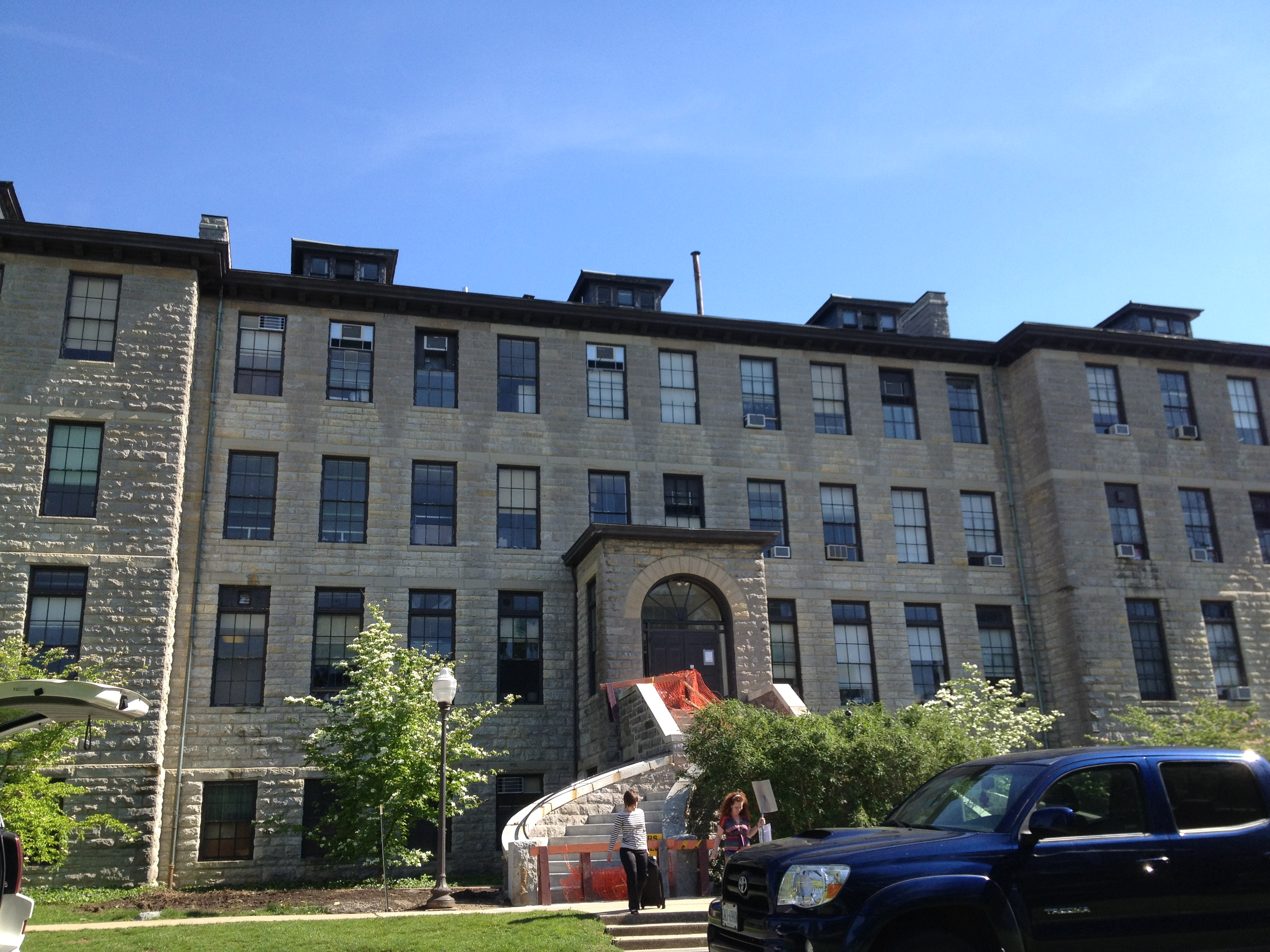
Price Hall

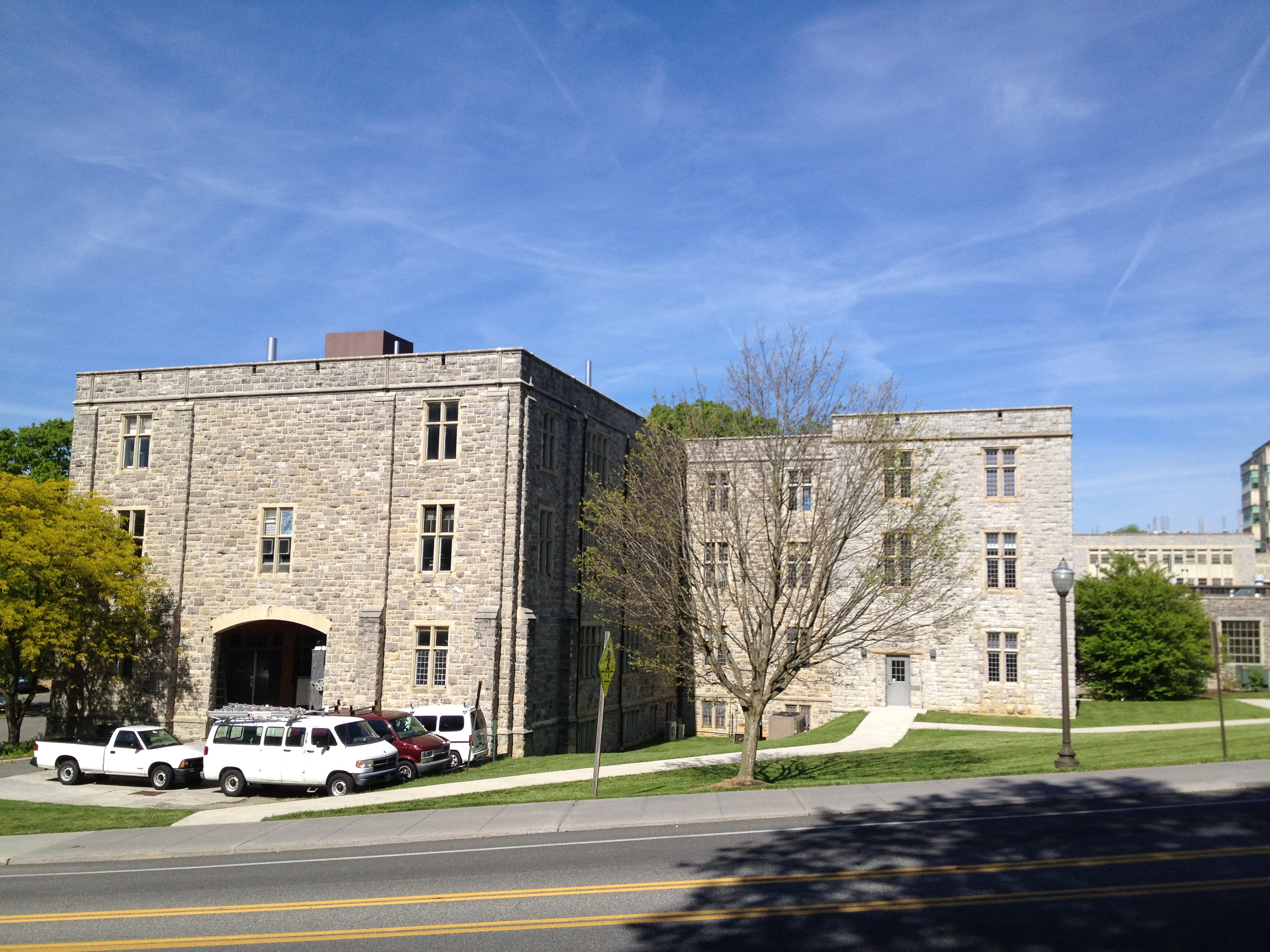
Saunders Hall

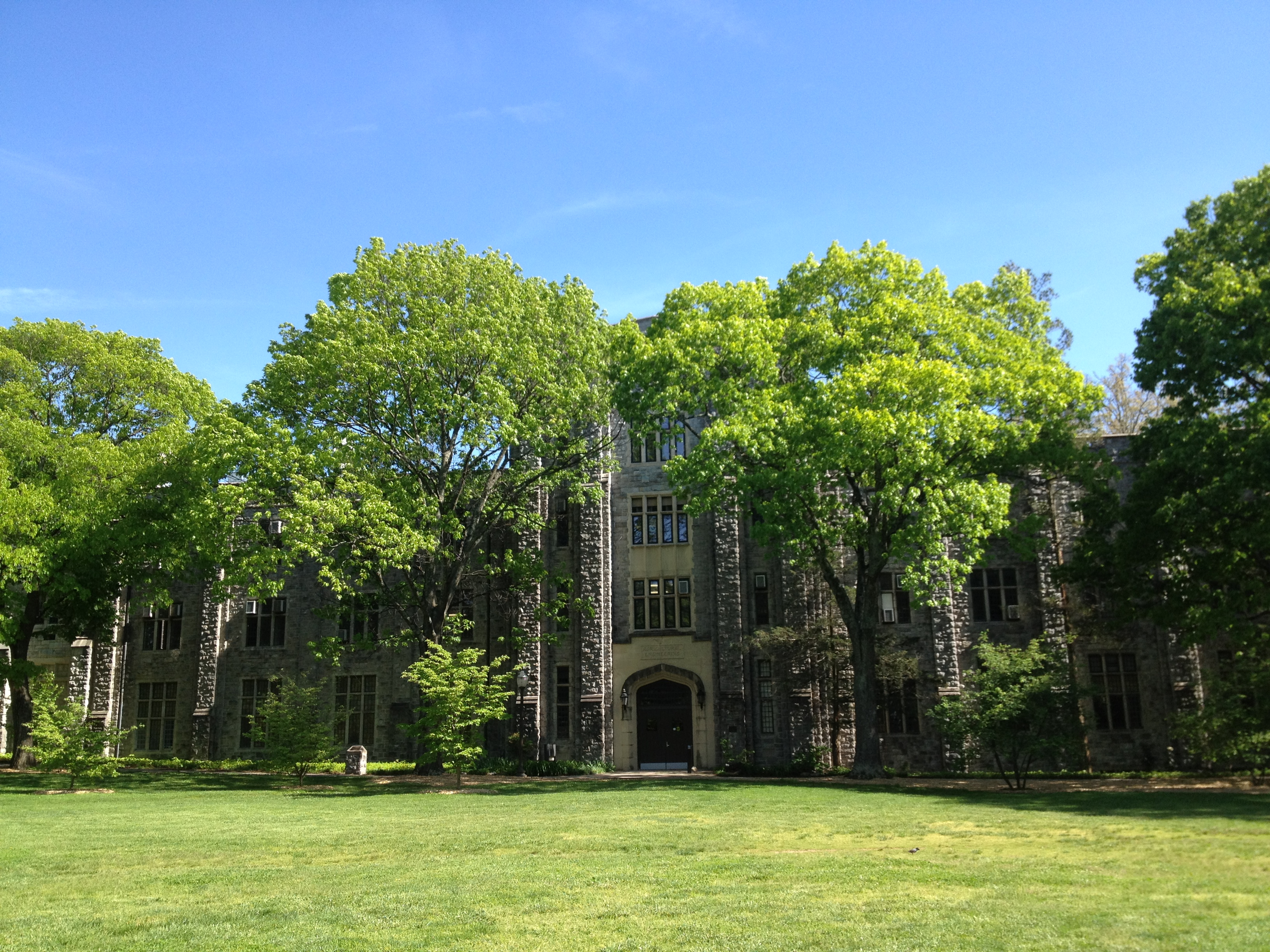
Seitz Hall

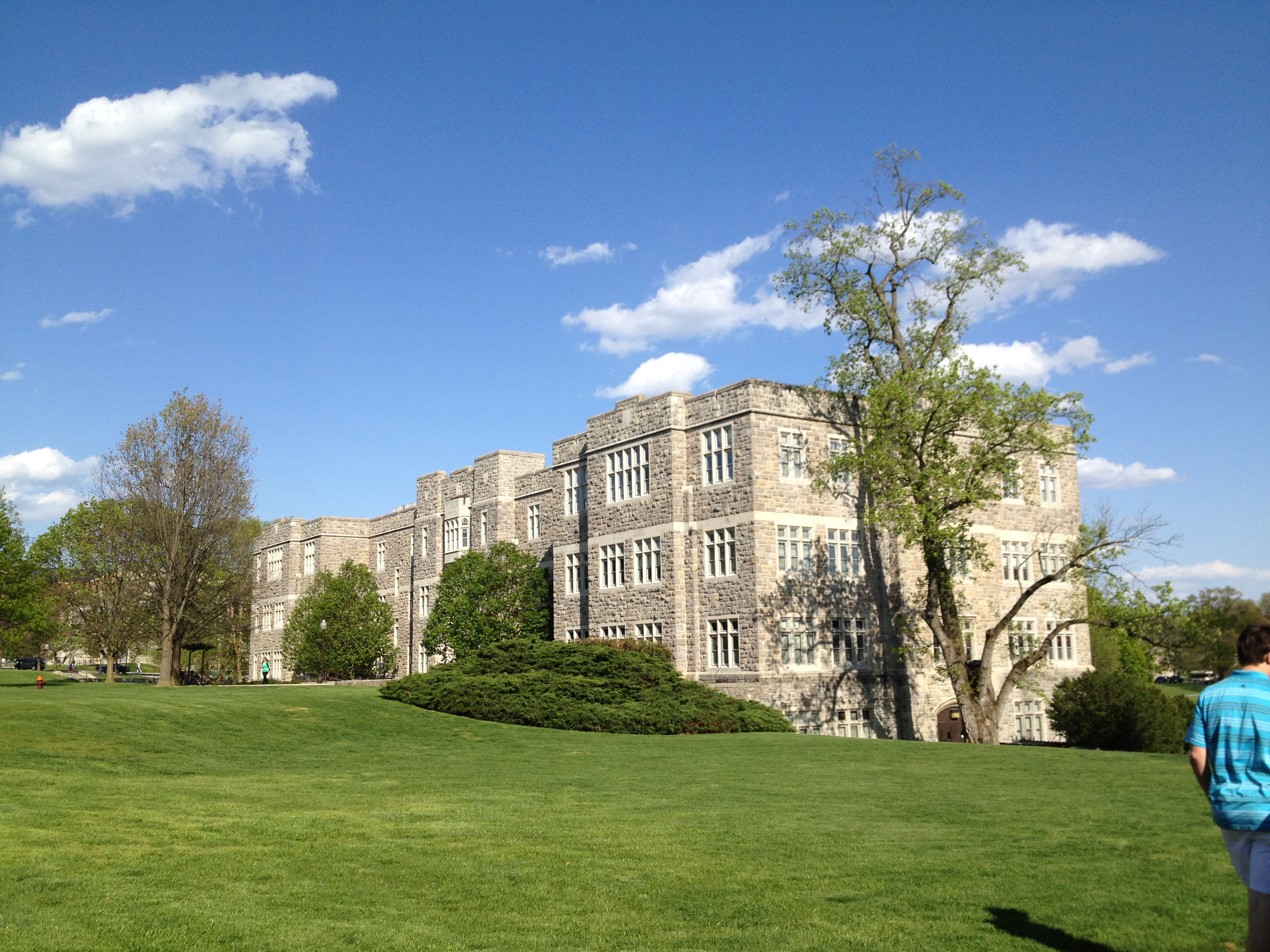
Patton Hall

== Athletics buildings ==
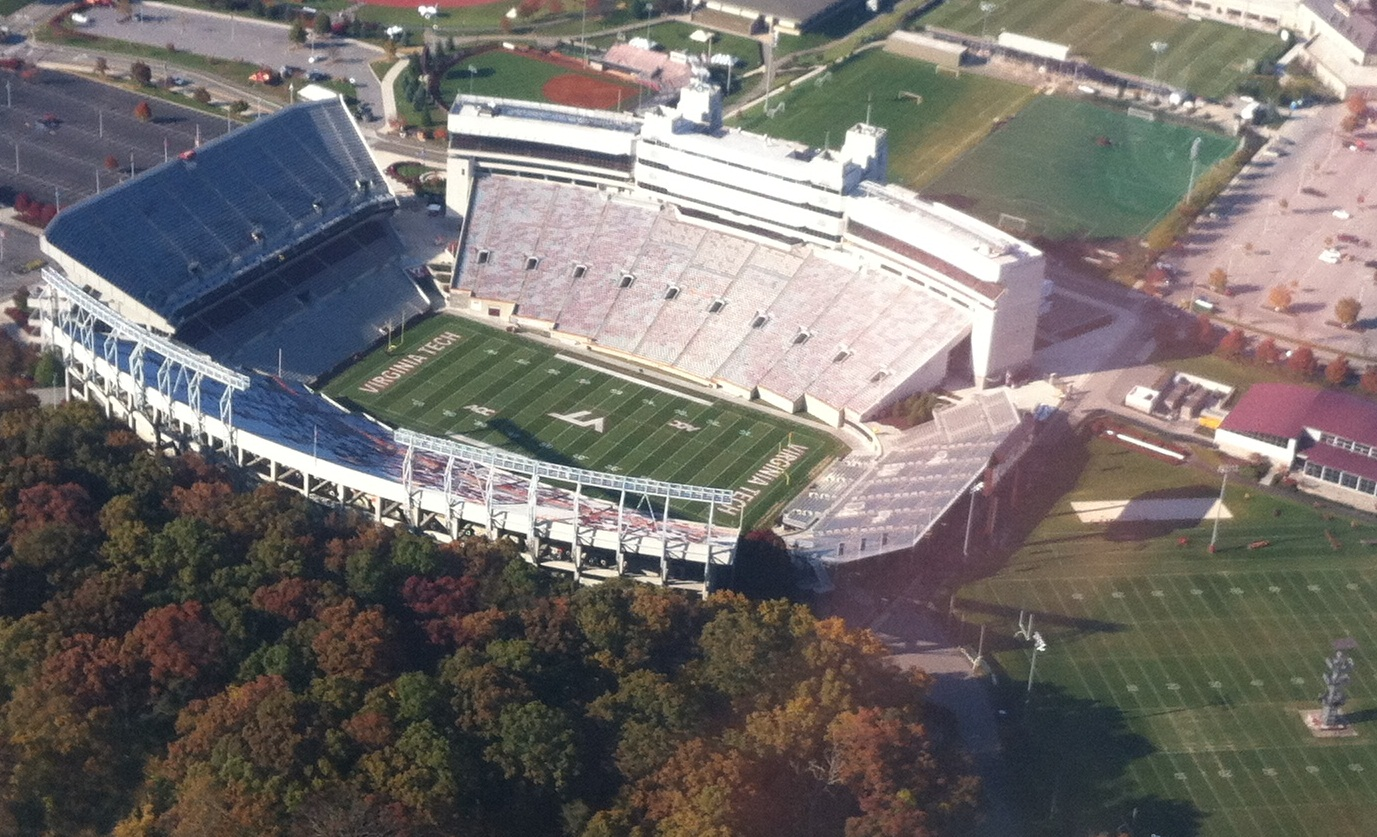
Aerial view of Lane Stadium (2011)

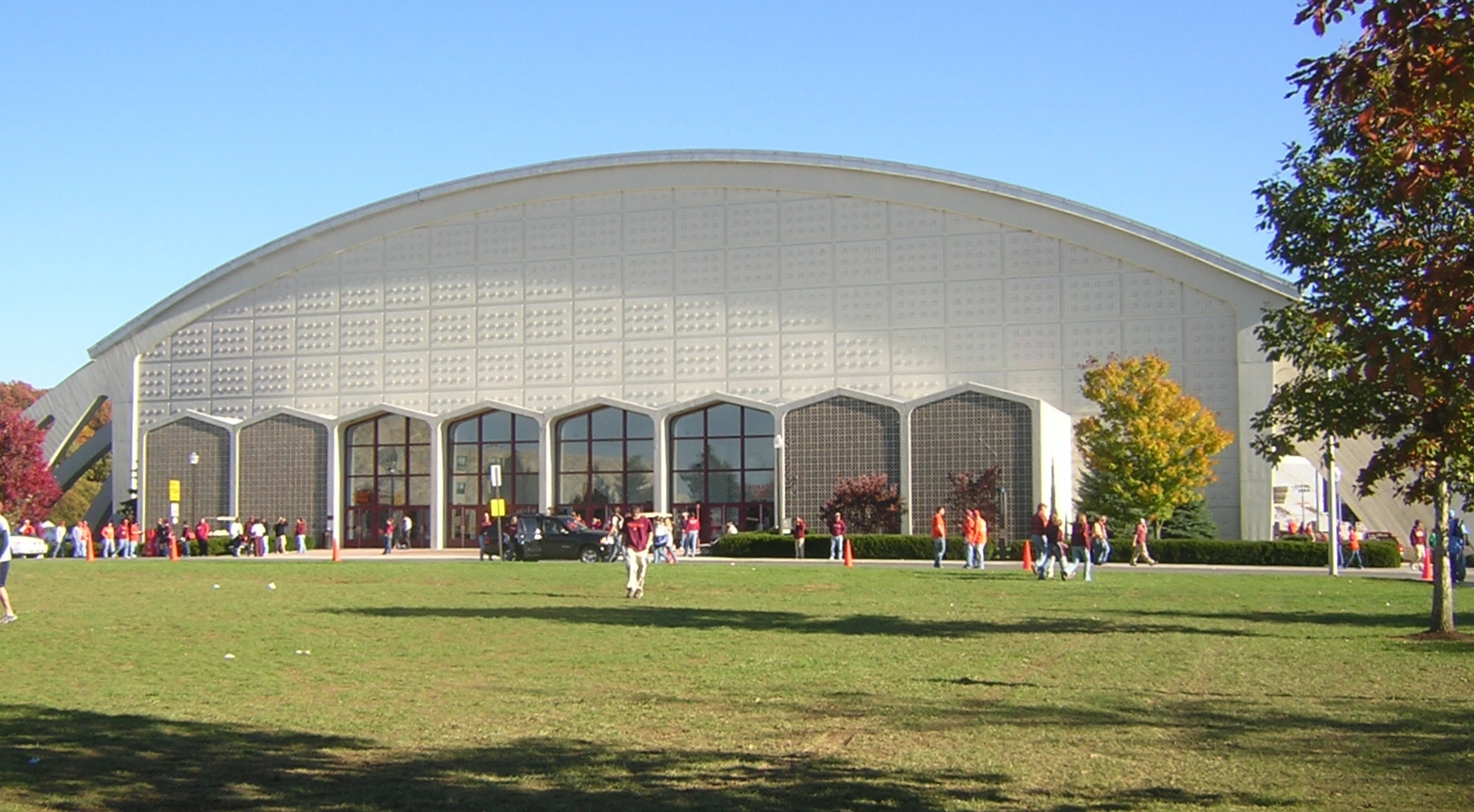
Cassell Coliseum indoor sports arena

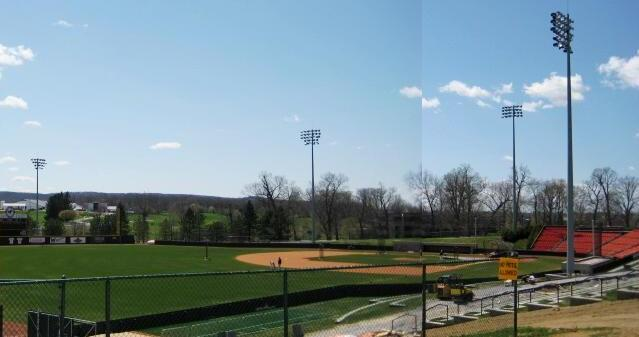
English Field baseball stadium

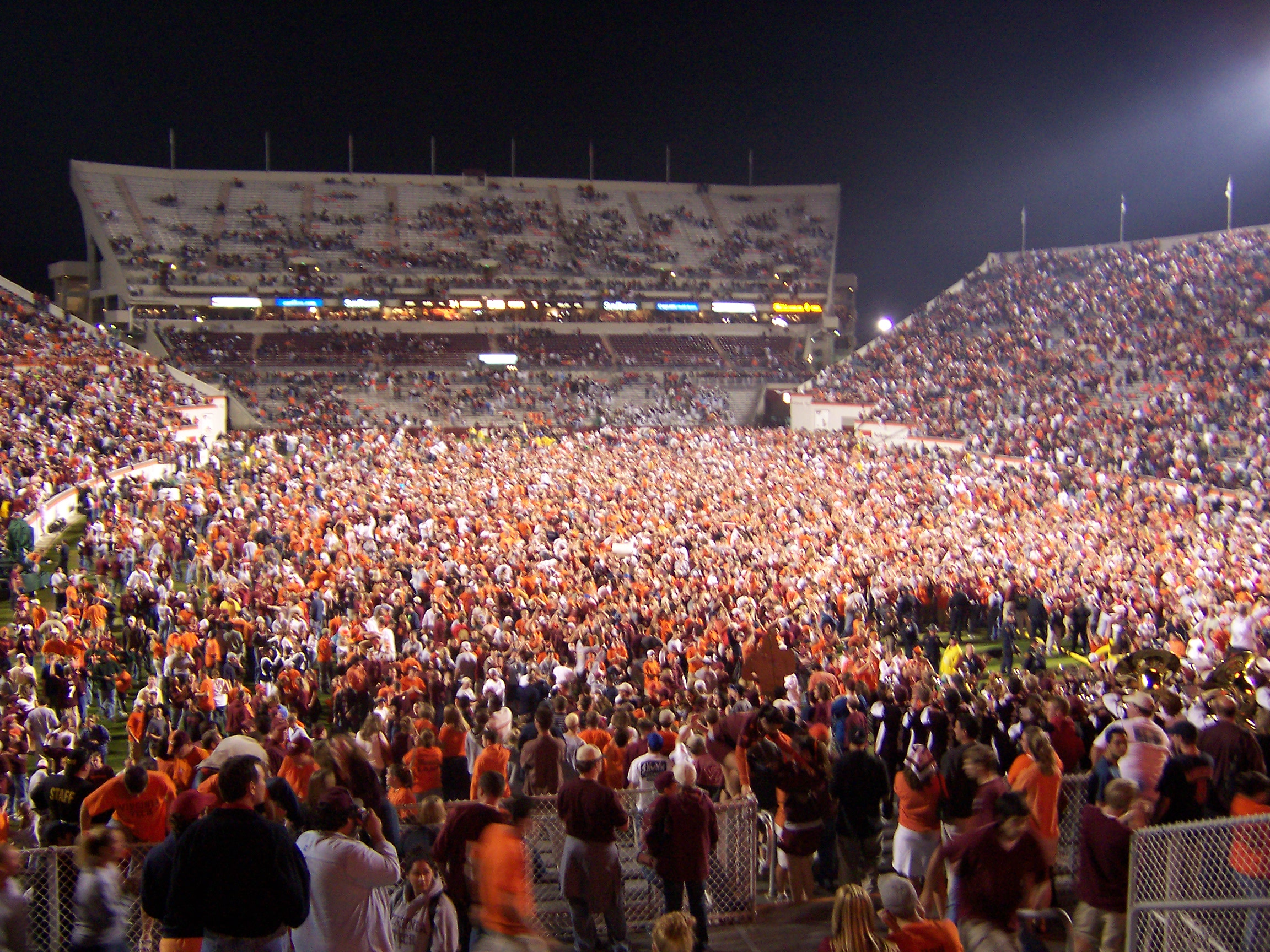
Virginia Tech students and fans rush the field after Virginia Tech defeated the Miami Hurricanes 31–7 on November 1, 2003.

=== Lane Stadium ===
Lane Stadium is the stadium for Virginia Tech's football team. It opened in 1965 has been rated as having the "number one home field advantage" in all of college football. It replaced Miles Stadium, a smaller facility that once stood directly behind the War Memorial Gym.

=== Cassell Coliseum ===
Cassell Coliseum is a 10,052-seat multi-purpose arena in Blacksburg, Virginia. The arena opened in 1961. It is home to the Virginia Tech Hokies men's and women's basketball teams.

=== Other athletics facilities ===
Additional athletic facilities:

- Buford Meredith Cross Country Course
- Burrows-Burleson Tennis Center
- Christiansburg Aquatic Center
- English Field (baseball)
- Football Locker Room Facility
- Hahn Hurst Basketball Practice Center
- Indoor Practice Facility
- James C. Weaver Baseball Center
- Johnson / Miller Track Complex
- Merryman Athletic Facility
- Olympic Sports Weight Room
- Pete Dye River Course
- Rector Field House
- Tech Softball Park
- Sandra D. Thompson Field
- War Memorial Pool
- Wrestling Locker Room / Practice Facility

== Halls of residence ==
=== Ambler Johnston Hall ===
Ambler Johnston Hall is a large co-ed undergraduate residence hall located on Washington Street across from the Cassell Coliseum parking lot in what is known as the Summit Community. Completed in 1968, the hall is named after Ambler Johnston, a 1904 graduate of Virginia Tech, who was the co-founder of Carneal & Johnston Architects (now Ballou Justice and Upton Architects).

The hall is divided into two wings, commonly referred to as East AJ and West AJ on campus. West AJ is the larger of the two halls and is taller by one story. The wings are connected by commons areas on the first, third, and sixth floors.

West AJ's fourth floor was the location of the first of two attacks during the Virginia Tech shootings on April 16, 2007, which resulted in the shooting deaths of a female resident and a male resident adviser. In early 2010, two students are reported to have broken onto the roof of the larger hall, West Ambler Johnston.

East Ambler Johnston reopened in the fall of 2011 as the Honors Residential College (HRC). The newly renovated East AJ features some rooms with private baths, several apartments where four student share a living room, bath, two bedrooms, and kitchen. Some traditional halls where bathroom facilities are shared by half a floor were retained; however, these too were remodeled. The latest renovation added air conditioning.

In the "bridge" that spans between East and West AJ and on the lower levels, there are meeting rooms, a student kitchen, a game room, a weight/exercise room, a theater, a library, a mail room, and laundry facilities that can be accessed through the university's "laundry web" (students can reserve machines and see if their wash/dry is done via the Internet). Also in the "bridge" is an apartment for the faculty members who are "in residence" in the HRC.

West AJ reopened in the fall of 2012. It houses the university's second Residential College with approximately 800 students and is divided into four houses: Hickory, Hawthorn, Honey Locust, and Holly. The Residential College focuses on building of community values and partnership, with each house holding its own events and having its own government structure.

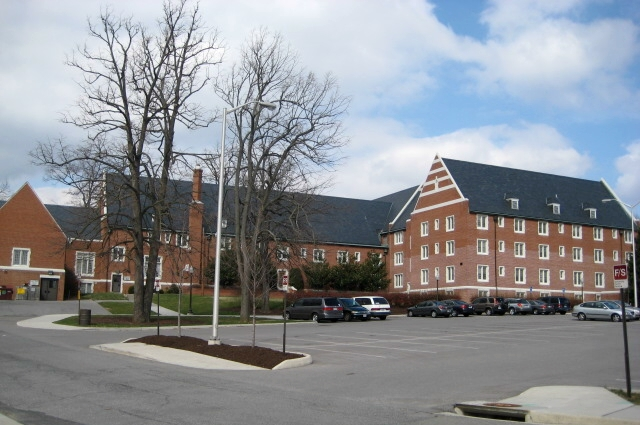
Hillcrest Honors Community

=== Hillcrest Hall ===
Hilcrest Honors Community is the smallest residence hall in Virginia Tech at a student capacity of 108. Unlike most of the other residence halls on campus, it is required that all of its occupants maintain a grade point average of 3.50 and it is customary that they live in the building for the duration of their undergraduate education. The Honors Residential College in East Ambler Johnston is the only other residence hall which has the same requirements.

In addition to being a residence hall on the second and third floors, Hillcrest houses Virginia Tech's University Honors offices on the first floor and the Residence Hall Federation office in the basement. Community residents thus have the opportunity to maintain close personal relationships with the Honors staff.

Hillcrest Hall is one of very few buildings and the only residence hall at Virginia Tech not named for a person. The name is derived from its location at the crest of a hill at the east end of Virginia Tech's central Drillfield, between West Campus Drive and the Grove. It is one of the few red brick buildings on a campus known for its "Hokie Stone" architecture.

When women were integrated into VPI, it was the first and only women's dormitory and was built on what was then the far corner of the campus near several large livestock barns used by the College of Agriculture that once stood near where Harper Hall now stands. When Hillcrest opened in 1940 it was promptly dubbed the "skirt barn" by VPI cadets. One of the Honors offices on the first floor used to be a "courting room" when Hillcrest Hall was the women's dormitory. Because visitation was not permitted in the residence hall, and women were not allowed to leave campus on dates, courting took place in this room. Young men would enter the room from one door and the young ladies would enter the room from another. Only a few feet away was the room where the house mother would be there to supervise.

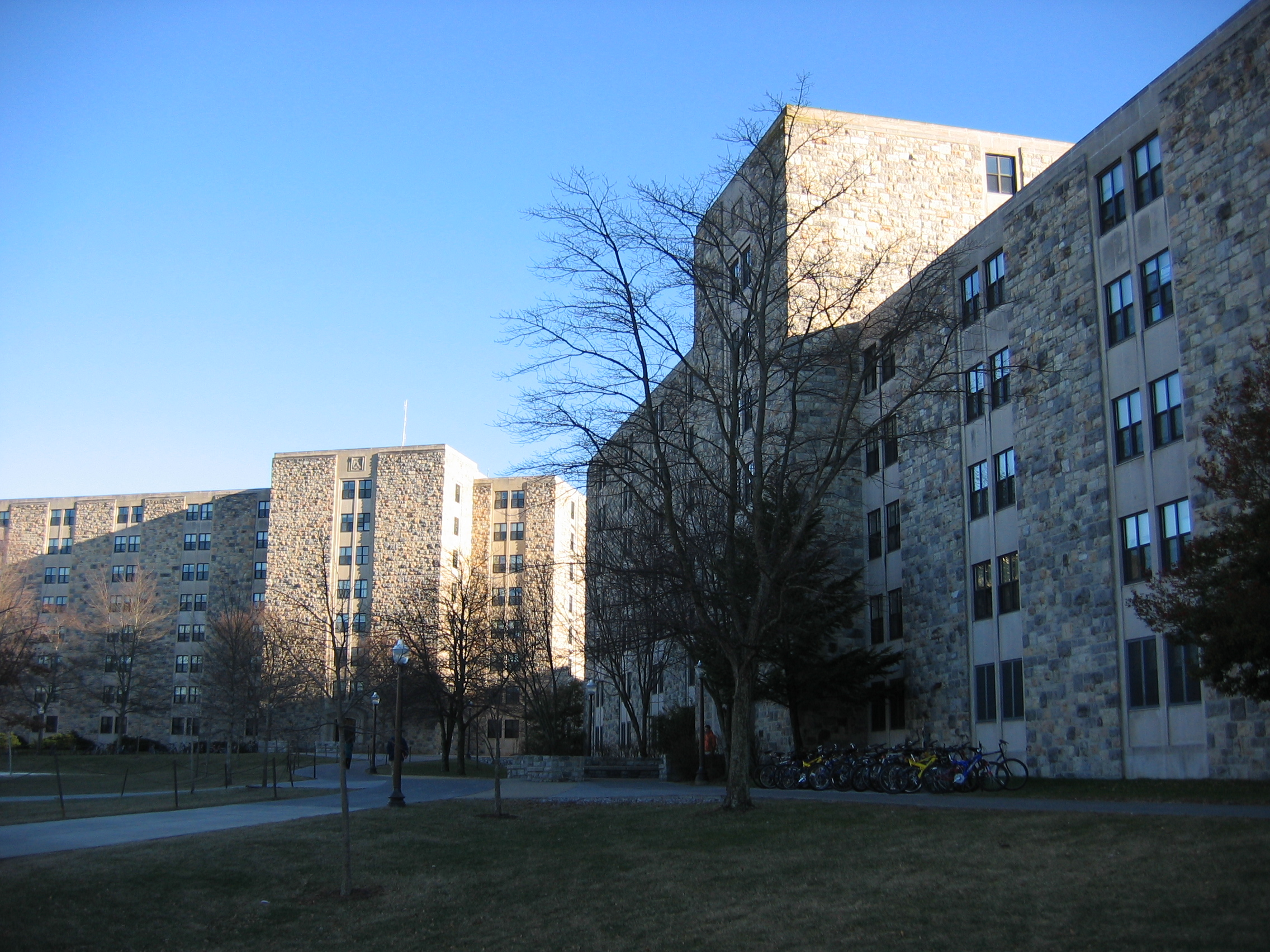
Hoge Hall (left) and Pritchard Hall (right)

=== Hoge Hall ===
Hoge Hall is located on Washington Street on the Prairie Quad. The building is named for Janie and William Hoge, a local African American couple that hosted several African American students, including Irving L. Peddrew III, between 1953 and 1959, before African American students were permitted to live on campus in 1961. The building was completed in 1966 and houses 811 residents on its eight floors. It also includes the Galileo and Hypatia engineering "living-learning" programs.

Hoge Hall was formerly known as Lee Hall for more than half a century. It was named for Dr. Claudius Lee, an 1896 alumnus of Tech and a professor of electrical engineering who served the university in various capacities for nearly seventy years. In 1997, students in a history class found a page in the 1896 Bugle (Virginia Tech's student yearbook) that seemed to indicate that while an undergraduate, over a century earlier, Claudius Lee had been president of a campus Ku Klux Klan where he was listed as the "Father of Terror" as well as being named "Arch-fiend" of the Pittsylvania Club organization, whose yearbook page featured a black person being lynched. After more than two decades of pressure from students and alumni, Lee Hall was renamed Hoge Hall after the late Janie and William Hoge. Janie and William Hoge were a local African American couple who ran a boarding house in Blacksburg and played a crucial role in the success and well-being of the first African American students attending Virginia Polytechnic Institute in the 1950s. At the time black cadets attending VPI, then a predominately white, predominately male, military institute were not allowed to live in the dorms or eat in the dining halls on campus due to Virginia's Jim Crow laws so they boarded with the Hoges instead.

A panel named by then-president Paul Torgersen to address the issue examined the available historical records about the organization. A Klan expert hired by the university, John Kneebone, determined that the Klan was extinct in Virginia in 1896, leaving open the possibility that this may have been some kind of collegiate society or fraternity attempting to appropriate the image of the Reconstruction era Klan. At the time proposals to rename the building were strongly opposed by many older alumni who had known Claudius Lee during his long tenure as a professor.

The issue of Lee Hall re-emerged in 2004, and the Virginia Tech Commission on Equal Opportunity and Diversity issued recommendations to broaden education on the subject of Claudius Lee and also for strengthening diversity efforts across the university. On August 13, 2020 the Virginia Tech Board of Visitors voted to rename Lee Hall, after a petition to rename the building on Change.org gained over 13,000 signatures. Another residence hall, Barringer Hall, named for the sixth president of Virginia Tech, Paul Brandon Barringer, a physician who advocated eugenics and expressed white supremacist views in his early 20th century speeches and writings was also renamed at the same time. This sentiment emerged as part of the broader social movement as a result of the ongoing George Floyd protests.

The building's penthouse, the highest point in Blacksburg, was home to the campus radio station, WUVT-FM's, transmitter until May 2009, when the station vacated Lee Hall as part of the process of upgrading to a new transmitter and transmit location atop Price Mountain.

=== Oak Lane Community ===
The Oak Lane Community is located off of the Duck Pond and Virginia Tech Golf course. The community features 15 houses that serve 19 fraternity and sorority chapters. The community is designated as Special Purpose Housing and while the buildings are considered to be private homes, the facilities are owned and maintained by Virginia Tech Housing and Residence Life. Oak Lane is also home to a pilot program, the Innovate Entrepreneurial Living Learning Community.

=== Slusher Hall ===
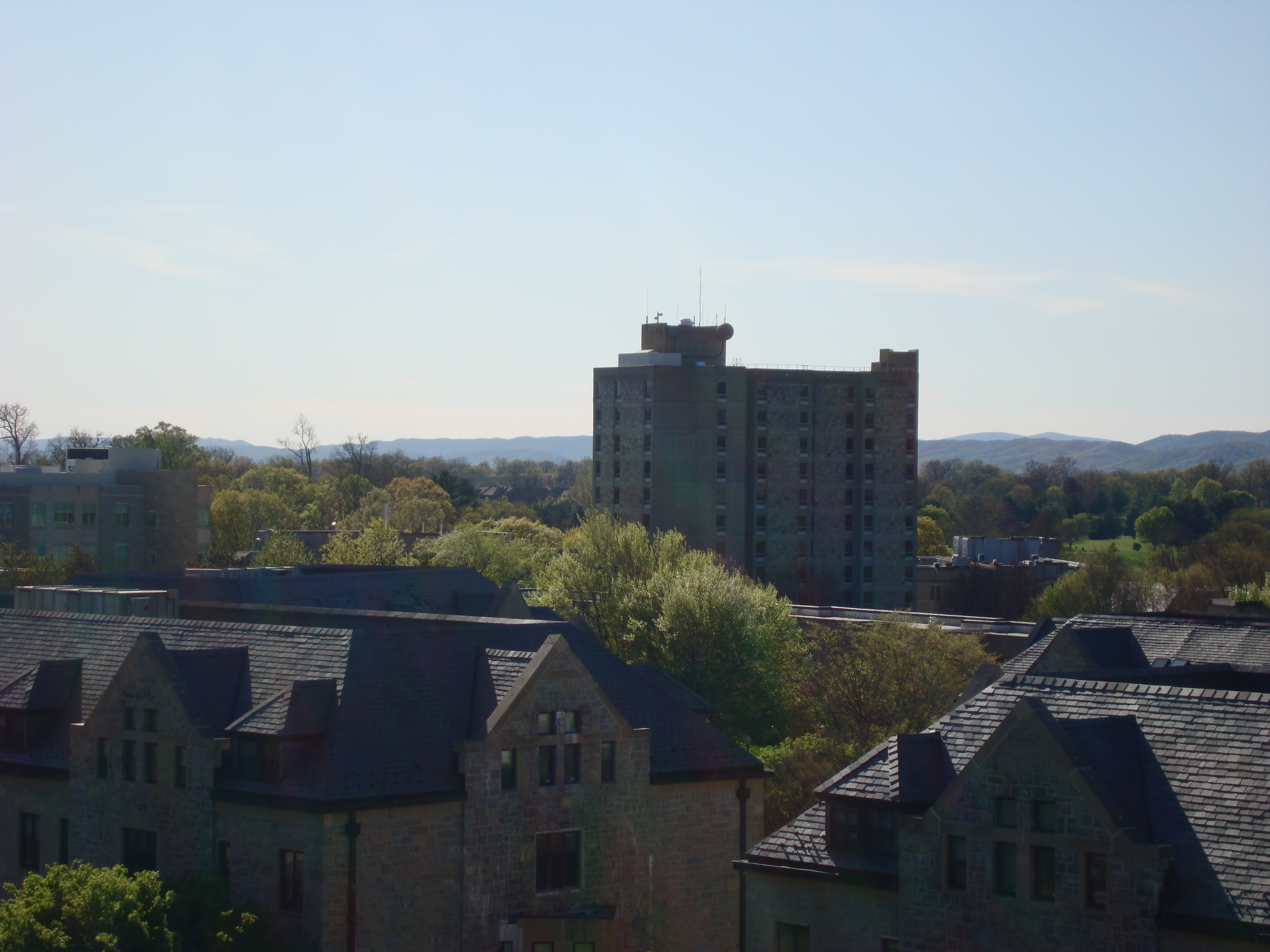
Slusher Hall seen looking west over campus

The twelve-storey Slusher Tower built in 1972 is the tallest building in Blacksburg. Slusher Tower, including a three-story annex, Slusher Wing, was originally an all male dorm is a co-ed residence hall, that houses 630 students and is home to the WING and MOSAIC theme housing programs. In 1997, Melinda Marie Somers, 18, a sophomore, died after accidentally falling through an open window on the 8th floor of Slusher Tower, prompting the university to install horizontal bars across windows in the building.

In 2018 the Virginia Tech Board of Visitors approved spending $3.5 million to develop a plan to replace Slusher Hall. Due to its poor condition, Virginia Tech has determined that the 50-year-old high-rise structure should be replaced rather than renovated. The university plans to first build and occupy a new residence hall near the existing Slusher Hall, then demolish Slusher Hall, and construct a second residence hall on the site. The two new residence halls will have a total student occupancy that will equal or exceed the existing Slusher Hall.

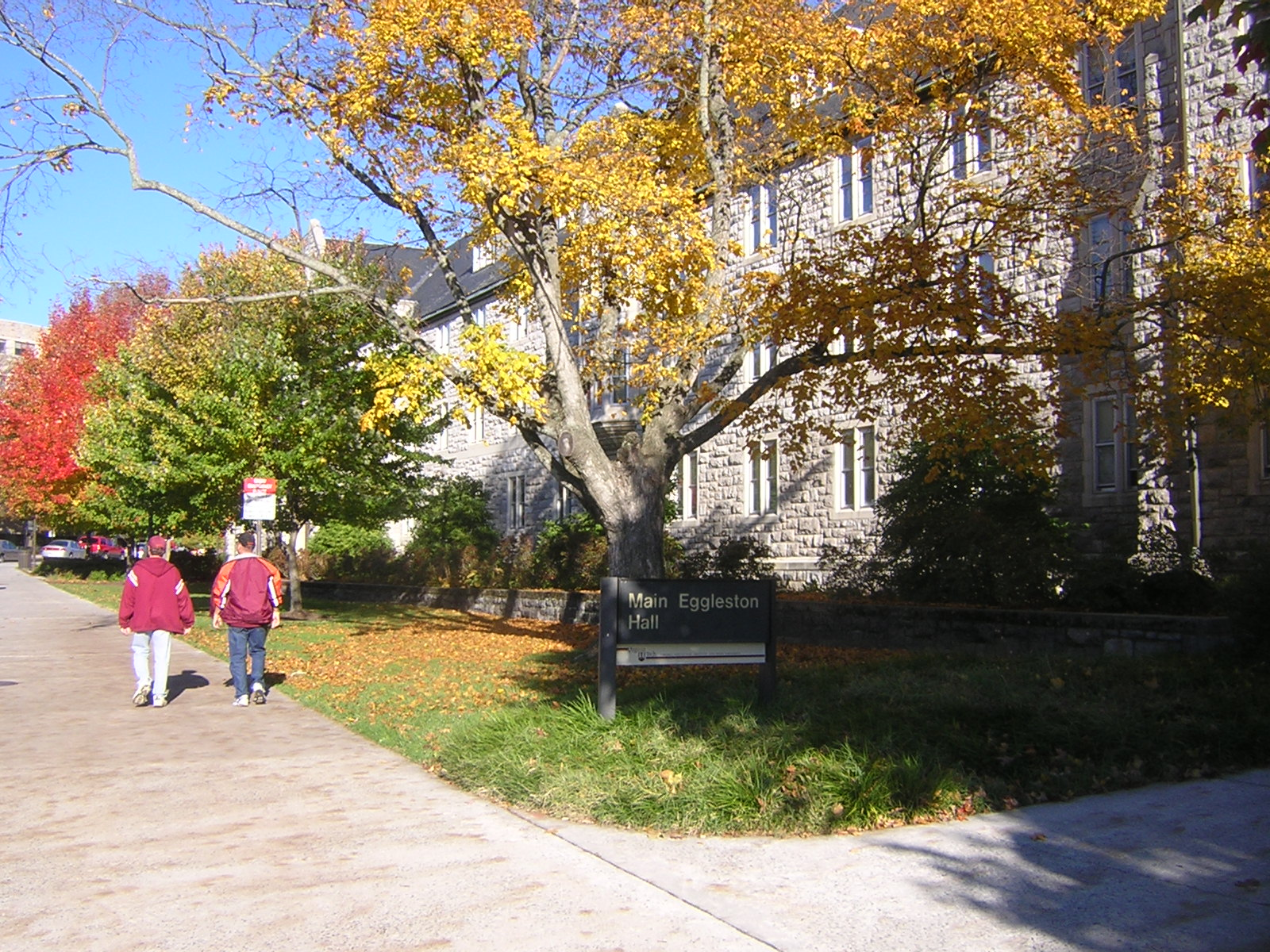
Virginia Tech's Main Eggleston Hall

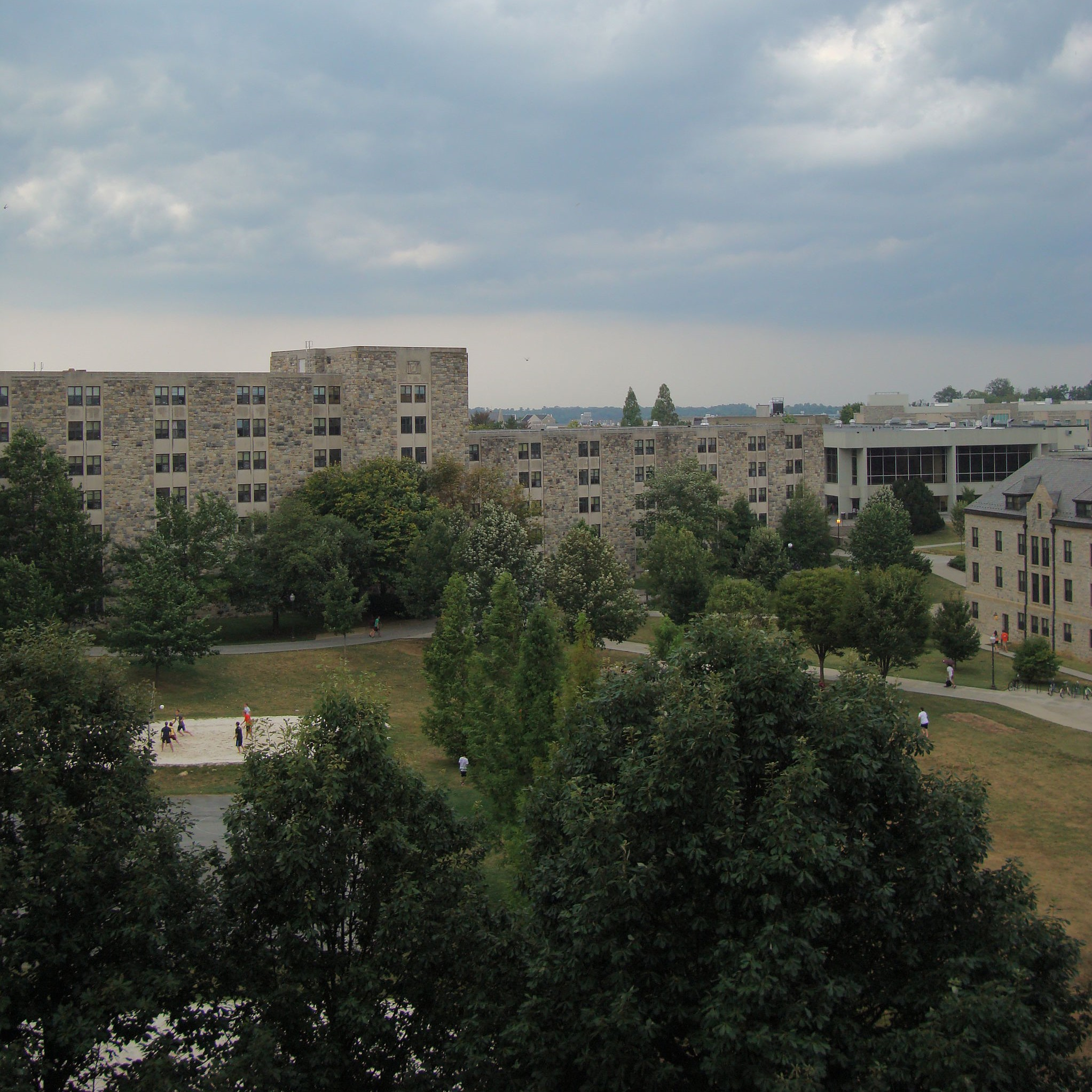
Pritchard Hall seen from O'Shaughnessy Hall

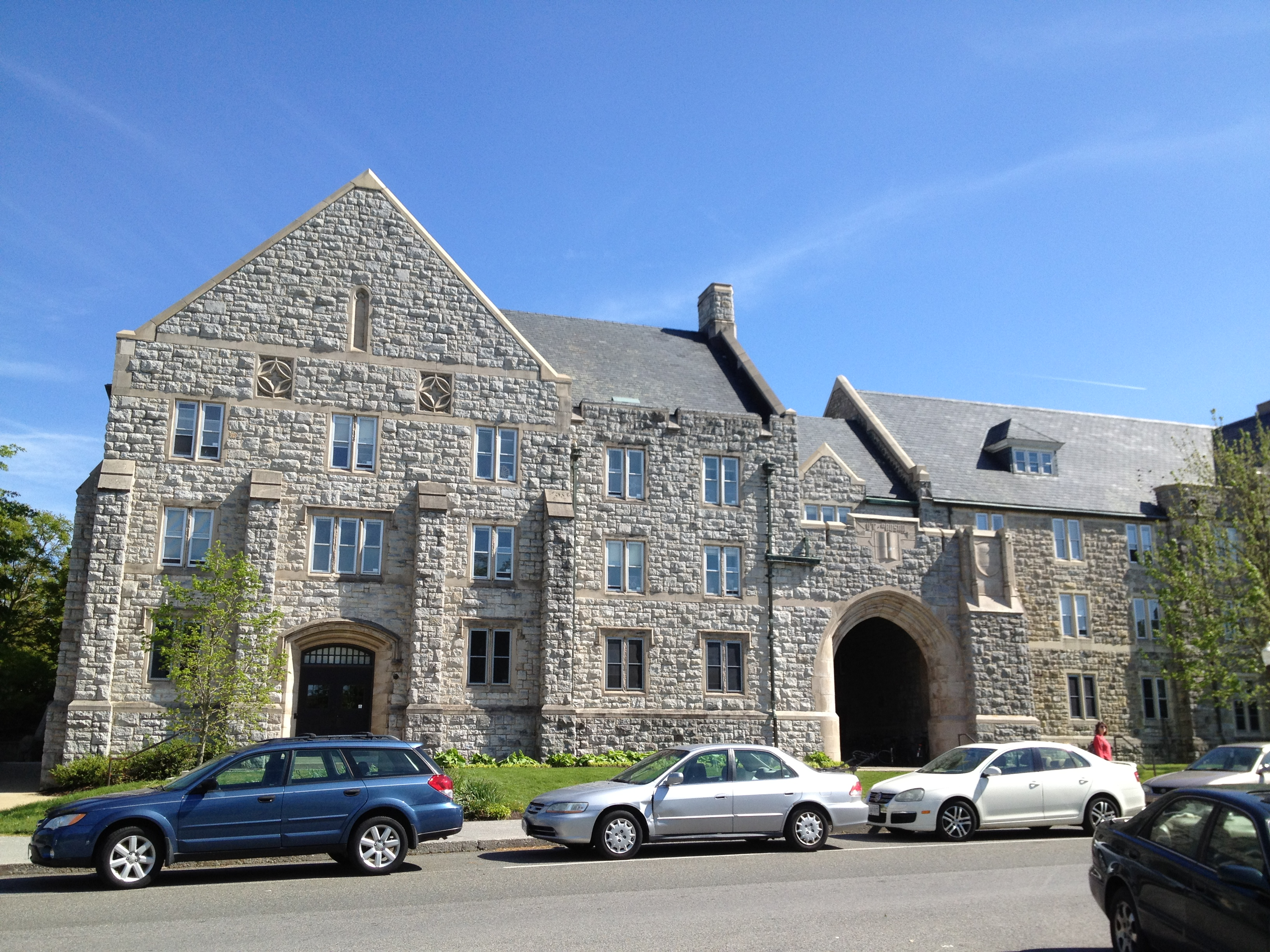
Campbell Hall

=== Other residence halls ===
- Whitehurst Hall – (1962) originally known as Barringer Hall named for Dr. Paul Brandon Barringer is an all-male residence hall. Located in the President's Quad and houses about 220 students. Barringer, a prominent physician who was chairman of the faculty at University of Virginia from 1895 to 1903 (then equivalent to president) and later served as the sixth president of Virginia Tech from 1907 to 1913 advocated eugenics and expressed white supremacist views in many of his early 20th century speeches and writings. In 2020 the Virginia Tech Board of Visitors voted to rename the building for alumnus, James Leslie Whitehurst, Jr. ’63, the first black student permitted to live on campus who was later appointed to the Virginia Tech Board of Visitors in 1970.
- Brodie Hall – (1957–2015) In 1957 the Second Academic Building (1877) was razed to construct Brodie Hall, the new building incorporated a remodeled Barracks No. 3 (1900). Named for Col. William Mayo Brodie, professor from 1901 to 1932, Brodie Hall served as a barracks for the Corps of Cadets for 58 years. Brodie Hall was demolished in 2015 and replaced by New Cadet Hall, completed in August, 2017.
- Campbell Hall – (1930) The main building, originally known as the Stone Dormitory or the Civilian Dormitory and later as Barracks No. 8 was completed in 1930. It was the first Hokie Stone dormitory at Virginia Tech and is the oldest building on the Virginia Tech campus still in use as a residence hall. The east wing, originally known as Barracks No. 9, was added in 1939 as a WPA project. In 1952 the building was named for, Theodorick Pryor Campbell, a former professor of modern languages, academic department head and dean of the college. East Campbell is one of three all-female residence halls.
- Cochrane Hall – (1983) A suite-style residence hall connected to West End Market. It was the first suite style residence hall on the Virginia Tech campus. It is home to many first-year student athletes.
- Eggleston Hall – (1935) Built as a WPA project, the main building known Main Eggleston was completed in 1935. Two wings known as East Eggleston and West Eggleston were added in the late 1930s. Originally constructed as barracks when Virginia Tech was an all-male military school, Eggleston is now a co-ed residence hall separated by floor. Eggleston Hall is named for the seventh president of Virginia Tech, Joseph Dupuy Eggleston.
- Femoyer Hall – (1949–2021) was located on the Upper Quad across from McBride Hall. Named for Medal of Honor winner, Second Lieutenant Robert Femoyer, a member of the Class of 1944, Femoyer Hall was originally built as a residence hall in 1949 and then served as an academic building, housing the Naval ROTC unit at Virginia Tech as well as the Student Success Center. It was demolished in October 2021.
- Graduate Life Center at Donaldson-Brown – (1935) A former hotel and conference center. Its lowest floor is home to the graduate school's administrative offices, classrooms, meeting rooms, and a small Au Bon Pain restaurant. The remaining three floors are graduate residences. The building is named for alumnus, Frank Donaldson Brown. The Graduate Life Center was also the site where Zhu Haiyang decapitated classmate Yang Xin in 2009.
- Harper Hall – (1999) One of the few suite-style air-conditioned residence halls on campus, it houses 256 residents. Some first-year students are assigned to Harper, often as the result of allergies.
- Johnson Hall – (1965) An all-female residence hall, located in the President's Quad and houses about 180 students.
- Lane Hall – (1888–1967) Originally known as Barracks Number 1, The building housed 130 male students until it was converted for use as academic offices in 1967. The building is named for James Henry Lane, the first Commandant of Cadets. It was added to the National Register of Historic Places in 2015.
- Major Williams Hall – (1957–1995) Named after Major Lloyd W. Williams, this dorm was opened in 1957 upon the completion of an addition and renovation project that combined Barracks No. 5,(1904) and Barracks No. 6 (1927). In 1995, an addition was constructed and the building was re-purposed for academic use.
- Miles Hall – (1964) An all-male residence hall located in the President's Quad and houses about 217 students. Miles Hall is named for Clarence Paul "Sally" Miles, known as "Mr. VPI," who spent nearly 59 years at Virginia Tech in a variety of capacities.
- Pearson Hall West – (2017) Opened in August, 2017, New Cadet Hall is an exact mirror duplicate of Pearson Hall East (2015) and is designed to house approximately one half of the members of the Corps of Cadets.
- Monteith Hall – (1949–2017) A co-ed residence hall, that housed both civilian and Corps of Cadets students, formerly located in the Upper Quad just west of the bend in Turner Street next to the Moss Arts Center. Monteith Hall was demolished in 2017. It was named for alumnus and Medal of Honor recipient, Jimmie W. Monteith.
- New Residence Hall East – (1998) An air-conditioned suite-style residence hall that opened in 1999 on the Prairie; former site of Miles Stadium, Lane Stadium's predecessor.
- New Hall West – (2009) Virginia Tech's newest residence hall. Its ground floor houses live-in professional staff and its first floor is dedicated to Student Affairs offices. The top three floors are air-conditioned double-occupancy sized rooms reserved for upperclassmen.
- Newman Hall (1964)– A co-ed residence hall located in the President's Quad. Co-ed by floor and home to the WORLD and W.E.L.L theme housing program. It is named for the tenth president of Virginia Tech, Walter Stephenson Newman.
- O'Shaughnessy Hall – (1966) A mid-sized co-ed residence hall, by floor, it houses many upper-class students.
- Payne Hall – (1993) The first residence hall at Virginia Tech to offer air conditioned rooms; a co-ed residence hall that offers both suite-style and traditional accommodations, it houses returning students and transfers only.
- Pearson Hall East – (2015) Pearson Hall is named after alumni James "J" and Renae Pearson. Dedicated on November 20, 2015, Pearson Hall replaced Rasche Hall (1957–2013). Totaling 234 dorm rooms, Pearson Hall is designed to house approximately one half of the members of the Corps of Cadets.
- Peddrew-Yates Residence Hall – (1998) Home to the Residential Leadership Community (RLC), a suite-style air-conditioned residence hall.
- Preston and Olin Building – (1872–1888) The Preston and Olin building was originally constructed 1855 to house the Preston and Olin Institute. The three-story red brick edifice facing Main Street contained three recitation rooms, a chapel, and 24 lodging rooms. After the founding of Virginia Agricultural and Mechanical College, the Preston and Olin building was used as a residence hall until 1888. After students moved into Barracks No. 1, (now known as Lane Hall), the Preston and Olin building was remodeled and converted into the Machine Shop. It was destroyed by fire in 1913.
- Pritchard Hall – (1967) Was the second-largest all-male residence hall on the East Coast for over 40 years. It was renovated and made co-ed in the fall of 2009 and houses about 1,040 students, mostly freshmen. This residence hall is the largest at Virginia Tech.
- Rasche Hall – (1957–2013) In 1957, the First Academic Building (1876) was razed to construct Rasche Hall, The new building also incorporated a remodeled Barracks No. 2(1894), and served as a barracks for the Corps of Cadets until its demolition in 2013. Pearson Hall was constructed on the site in 2014–2015.
- Shanks Hall – (1957–1990s) In 1957, Science Hall, also known as Barracks No 7, was razed to construct Shanks Hall. Named after David Carey Shanks, Jr., who served as commandant of cadets from 1895 to 1898, this dorm opened in 1958 and incorporated a renovated Barracks No. 4 (1902). Shanks Hall housed 320 men until it was converted to house 302 women in 1970. It was converted to academic office space in the mid 1990s. The building was renovated in 2001 and a small addition was made.
- Thomas Hall – (1949–2017) A co-ed residence hall that housed 355 students. The building was formerly located in the Upper Quad across Old Turner Street from the Power Plant. Thomas Hall was demolished in 2017. It was named for alumnus and Medal of Honor recipient, Herbert Joseph Thomas.
- Vawter Hall – (1962) A co-ed residence hall located in the President's Quad near Owens Dining Hall and Hokie Grill. Vawter was an all-male residence hall until 2013, when it was made co-ed. The building is named for Charles E. Vawter who served on the board of visitors from 1886 to 1900 and was rector from 1889 to 1900.
- Women's Auxiliary Dormitory – (1963–1966) Built in 1921 as faculty housing and originally known as the Extension Apartment House the building was remodeled 1963 for use as a women's dormitory to house 34 female students. In 1966 it was converted to academic offices and used by various departments until it was destroyed by fire in 1971. The University Bookstore now occupies the site.

=== Living Learning Programs (LLPs) ===
Virginia Tech offers 23 Living Learning Communities (LLCs) and 3 Residential Colleges for on-campus students. They serve as an alternative experience for their residents and communities range across a variety of topics and shared experiences. Most of these programs have course requirements for participation, with some noted exceptions.

Name	Focus	Location	Required Course(s)?	Notes
Aurora	Interfaith	Harper Hall	Yes	
Casa Maderni	International Scholarship	Steger Center (Riva San Vitale, Switzerland)	Yes	Offered to those studying abroad.
Corps of Cadets	Senior Military College	Upper Quad	Yes	Considered a Living Learning Program (LLP) by definition, though far more encompassing than others offered at the university. Required for students in order to participate in any of the ROTC programs.
Digerati	Information Technology	Pritchard Hall	Yes	
Galileo	Engineering	Pritchard Hall	Yes	Male students only.
GenerationOne	First-Generation Students	Slusher Tower	Yes	
Hypatia	Engineering	Pritchard Hall	Yes	Female students only.
Hillcrest Honors	Honors College	Hillcrest Hall	Yes	
Impact	Data Analytics	Cochrane Hall	Yes	
Innovate	Entrepreneurship	Creativity and Innovation District (CID)	Yes	
Lavender House	LGBTQ+ Studies	O'Shaughnessy Hall	Yes	
Meraki	Well-being	Payne Hall	Yes	
Mozaiko	Languages and Global learning	Harper Hall	Yes	Contains nine smaller communities dedicated to different focus languages.
Orion	Sciences	New Residence Hall East	Yes	
Reach	Education and Human Services	Slusher Tower	Yes	
Rhizome	Sustainability	Creativity and Innovation District (CID)	Yes	
The Roost	Recovery	Payne Hall	Yes	
Securitas	Cybersecurity	Cochrane Hall	Yes	
Studio 72	Arts and Creativity	Creativity and Innovation District (CID)	Yes	
Thrive	Personal Growth	Slusher Tower	No	
Transfer Experience	Transfer Students	Newman Hall	Yes	
Ujima	Africana Studies	Peddrew-Yates Hall	Yes	
VIA	Undecided Students	Newman Hall	Yes	

Residential Colleges, unlike LLCs, have a live-in faculty principal and a more complex structure of student leadership. Students who opt to participate in one of these programs also must agree to two years of on-campus housing rather than just one, as is required for most incoming freshmen by the university.

Name	Focus	Location	Required Course(s)?	Notes
Honors Residential Commons	Honors College	East Ambler Johnston Hall	Yes	
Leadership and Social Change Residential College	Leadership Development	O'Shaughnessy Hall	Yes	
Residential College at West Ambler Johnston	Community	West Ambler Johnston Hall	No	Contains four smaller houses, reminiscent of those found in the fantasy series Harry Potter.

=== Residence Hall Federation ===
The Residence Hall Federation (RHF) is a University Chartered Student Organization. This organization exists to serve the 9,000 on-campus residents through hall councils in each residence hall. The RHF is composed of 23 hall councils, representing the residents of each hall, and three community councils, which represent two or more halls that share a common trait. Each individual hall council receives a programming budget of $1 per resident (or $400 if there are fewer than 400 residents) from the Student Programs office and from the RHF budget. The RHF Officer Group consists of 16 members, composing an Executive Board and a Board of Directors.

Like the Resident Advisors employed by the school, the Hall Councils produce programs that entertain and educate the residents of the buildings that they serve. These programs range from movie nights to exam study breaks. In addition, the RHF officer group also puts on campus-wide programs, under the command of the Director of Programs. Traditionally, the campus-wide programs have been Campus-Kickoff, Pizza Bonanza, and Hokies Hold'Em. The RHF also performs a number of community service projects.

== Dining halls ==
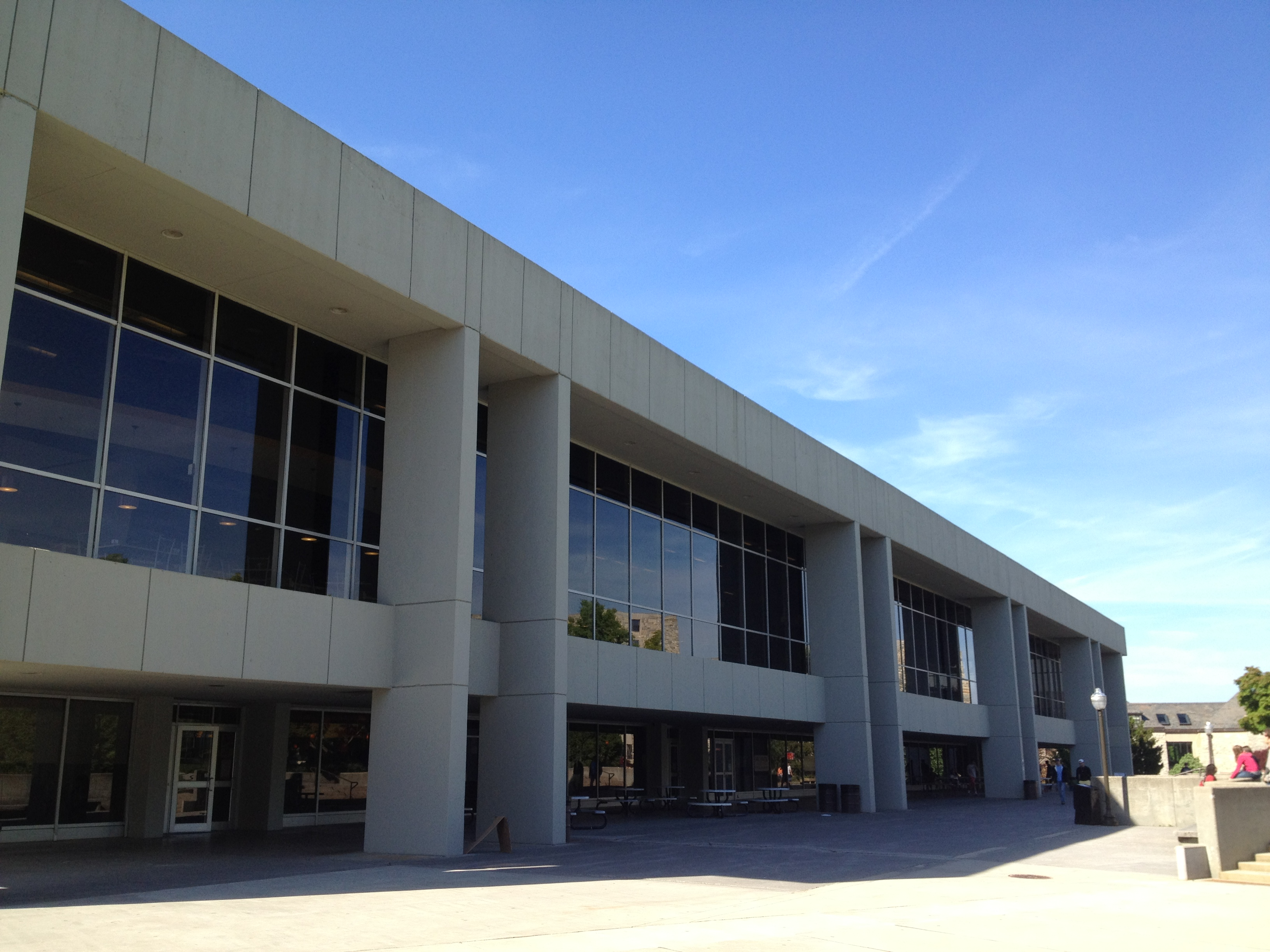
D2 Dining Hall on the second floor, with Deet's Place, DX, and The General Store on the ground floor

=== Dietrick Dining Center ===
Dietrick Dining Center, or Dietrick Hall, is the largest of Virginia Tech's six dining facilities, seating 1,100 and serving on average 3,758 students daily. The building opened in 1970 at a cost of $2.8 million.

The main dining area, now called "D2", was known as the "Depot at Dietrick" prior to a $6.5 million renovation completed in 2004 that converted the hall from a cafeteria-style facility to one that more closely resembles a food court. The building also contains the Dietrick General Store, an extension of the University Bookstore; "Deet's Place", a coffee and ice cream shop; and the Dietrick Express, a fast food à la carte facility.

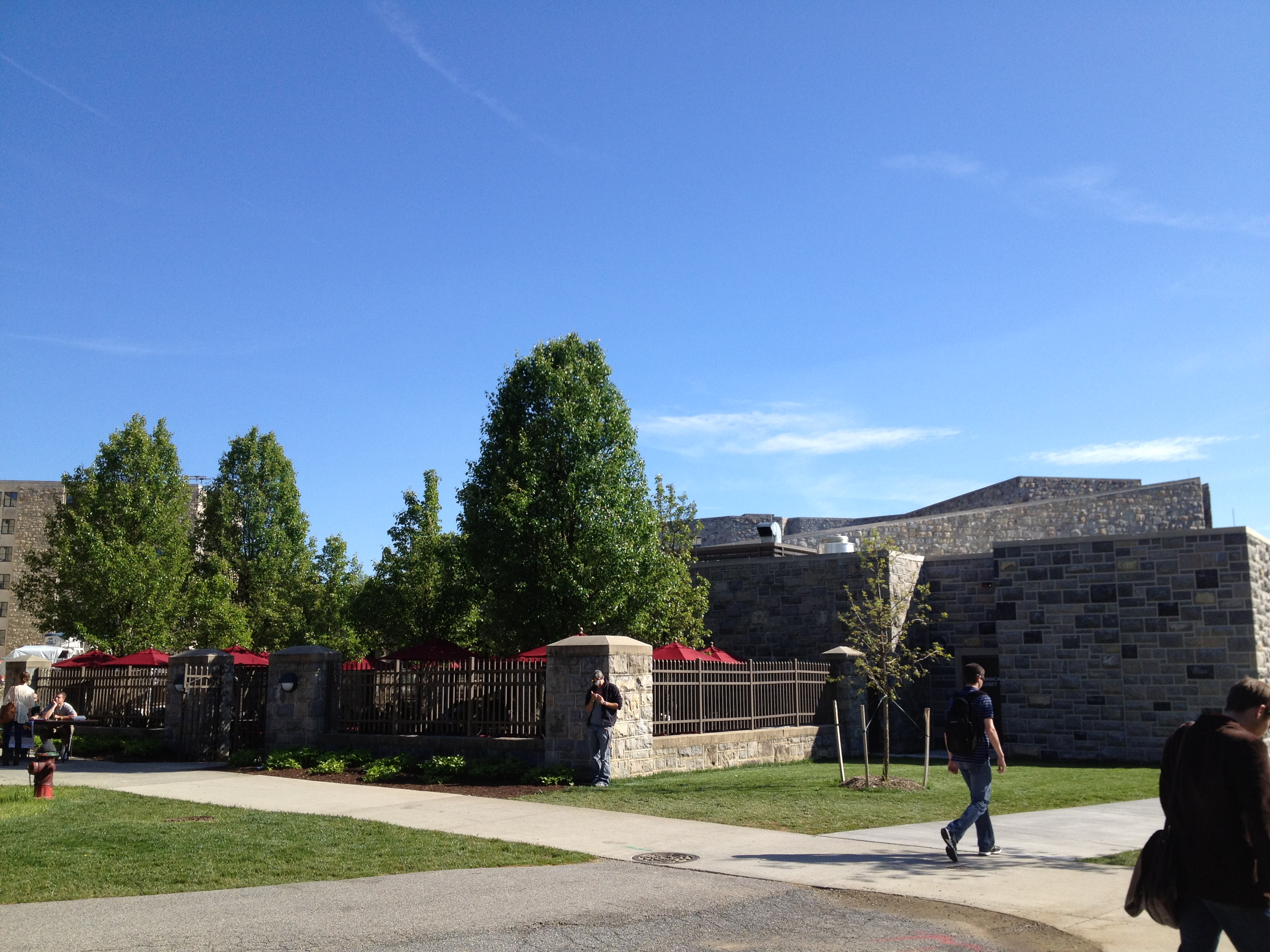
West End Market

=== West End Market ===
West End Market opened in 1999 as Virginia Tech's second major food court dining facility. Adjoined to Cochrane Hall, this facility was known as Cochrane Dining Hall until it closed in 1997 for remodeling.

West End Market was recognized in 1999 by the National Association of College and University Food Services as the best university specialty restaurant in the country and has been rated by the Princeton Review as one of the Top 3 school dining facilities multiple times, achieving the #1 spot in 2006.

West End Market offers students meals ranging from burgers, sandwiches, wraps, and pizza (cooked in a their own stone hearth pizza oven), to fresh grilled fish, steaks, and lobster taken from JP's Chop House Lobster tank.

=== Owens Hall ===
Owens Hall opened in 1940 as a replacement for Virginia Tech's military mess hall. It was closed and completely renovated in the early 1990s.

The Food Court contains twelve a la carte specialty shops. Owens Hall was voted by Joe Frett Weekly to have the "Best Philly Cheesesteaks in the U.S." In 1997, a section of the building called the Hokie Grill & Co. was remodeled to feature Chick-fil-A and Pizza Hut franchises. In its first year, the Chick-fil-A became the top-selling of all Chick-fil-A franchises located on college campuses. Other shops featured include Wǎn, featuring Asian cuisine, Tazón, with Mexican dishes, and Frank's, a sandwich shop named after former football coach Frank Beamer.

Owens Hall is located on Kent Street in the Lower Quad.

=== Turner Place ===
Opened in August 2012, Turner Place at Lavery Hall is the newest dining hall at Virginia Tech. It features: Atomic Pizzeria, Jamba Juice, 1872 Fire Grill, Qdoba Mexican Grill, Origami (a hibachi grill), Soup Garden, Dolci e Caffe, and Bruegger's Bagels. There is also a 256-seat dining hall that is for the Corps of Cadets.

=== Other dining facilities ===
- Au Bon Pain (located at Squires Student Center and another located in Goodwin Hall)
- Burger '37 (located at Squires Student Center)
- DXpress (located at Dietrick Hall)
- Vet Med Cafe (located in the Vet Med Commons)

== Miscellaneous buildings ==
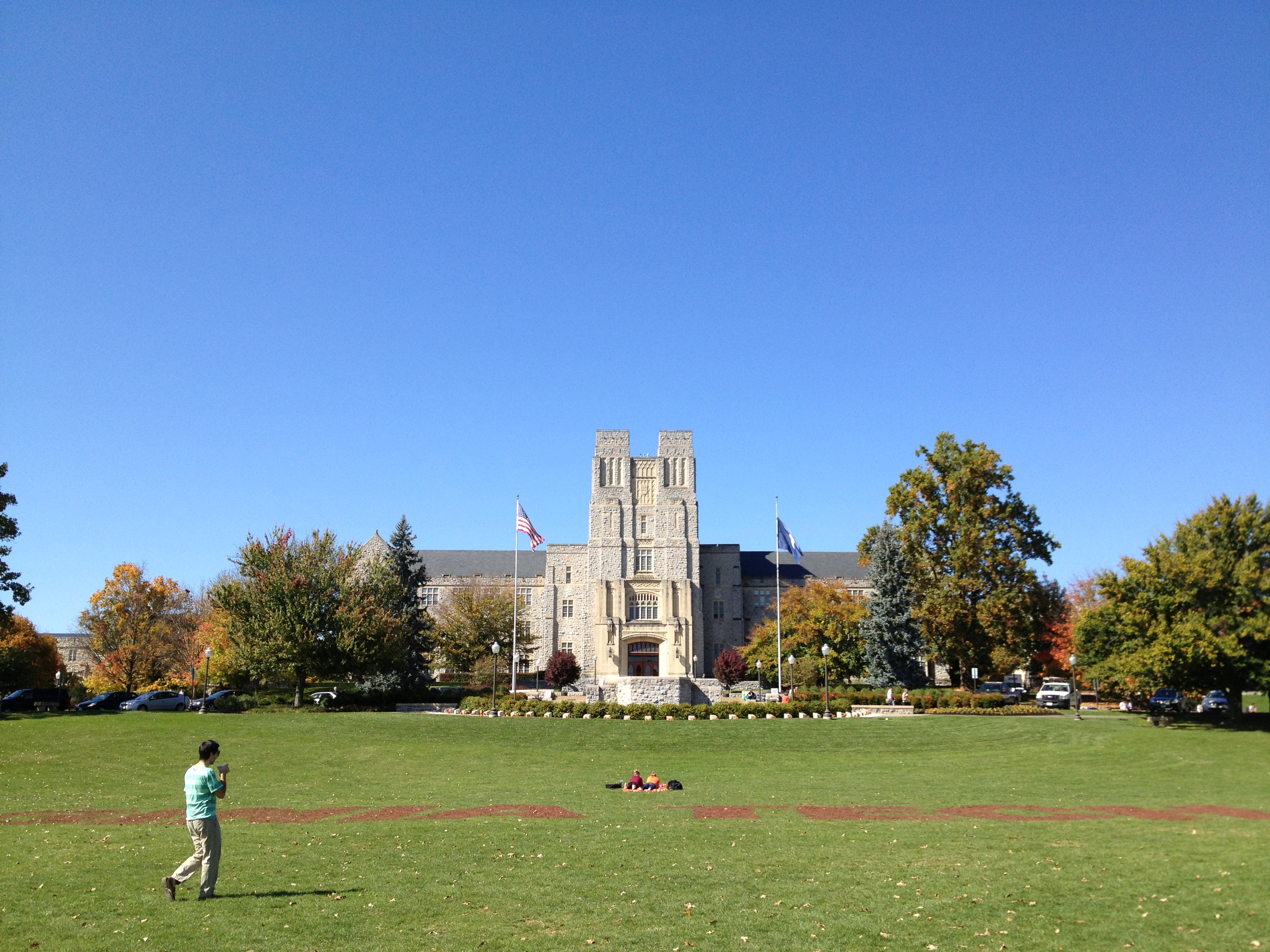
Burruss Hall as seen from the Drillfield

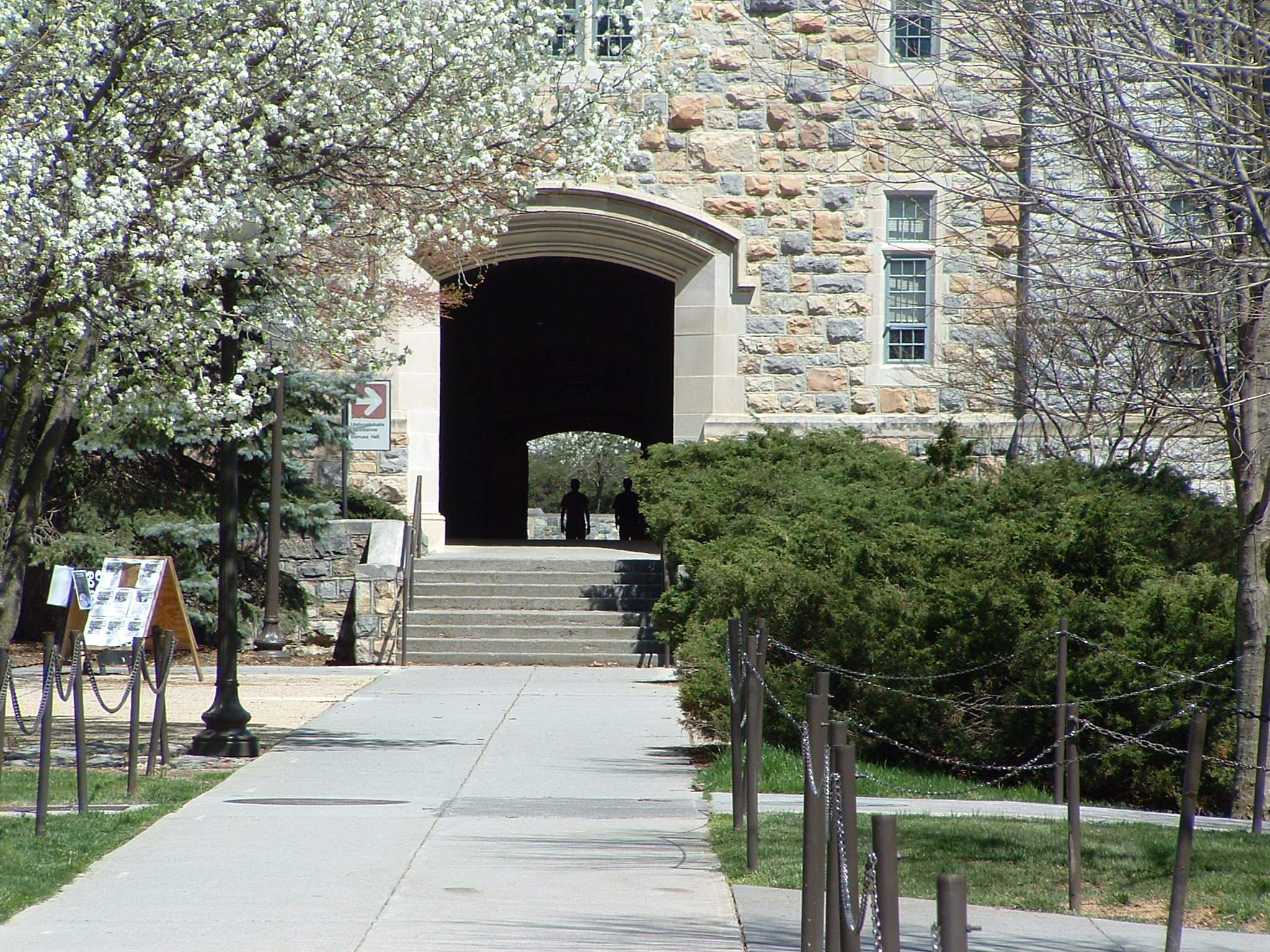
The Burruss Hall Tunnel

=== Burruss Hall ===
Burruss Hall is the main administration building, it also contains a 3,003-seat auditorium and houses several departments in the College of Architecture and Urban Studies. It consists of the original building, completed in June 1936 (cost $428,404; 77,080 sq ft (7,161 m^{2}) ); a west wing and rear addition, built in 1968 (cost $1,536,899; 60,503 sq ft (5,620.9 m^{2})); and an east wing, built in 1970 (cost $593,729; 20,638 sq ft (1,917.3 m^{2})). The cornerstone of the original building was laid at the 1935 commencement; the first commencement was held in the auditorium in June 1936. An electronic carillon, costing $28,000, was added in 1958 and was dedicated at Homecoming that year. It was originally known as the Teaching and Administration Building.

Julian Ashby Burruss (1876–1947) was President from 1919 to 1945. The first alumnus president, Burruss guided VPI through tremendous increases in faculty, student body, and degree offerings; vast growth in the physical plant; and efficient changes in administrative structure. He successfully pushed to admit women and shortened the military requirement to two years, setting the stage for a larger civilian student body. During his tenure, Radford College became the Women's Division of VPI.

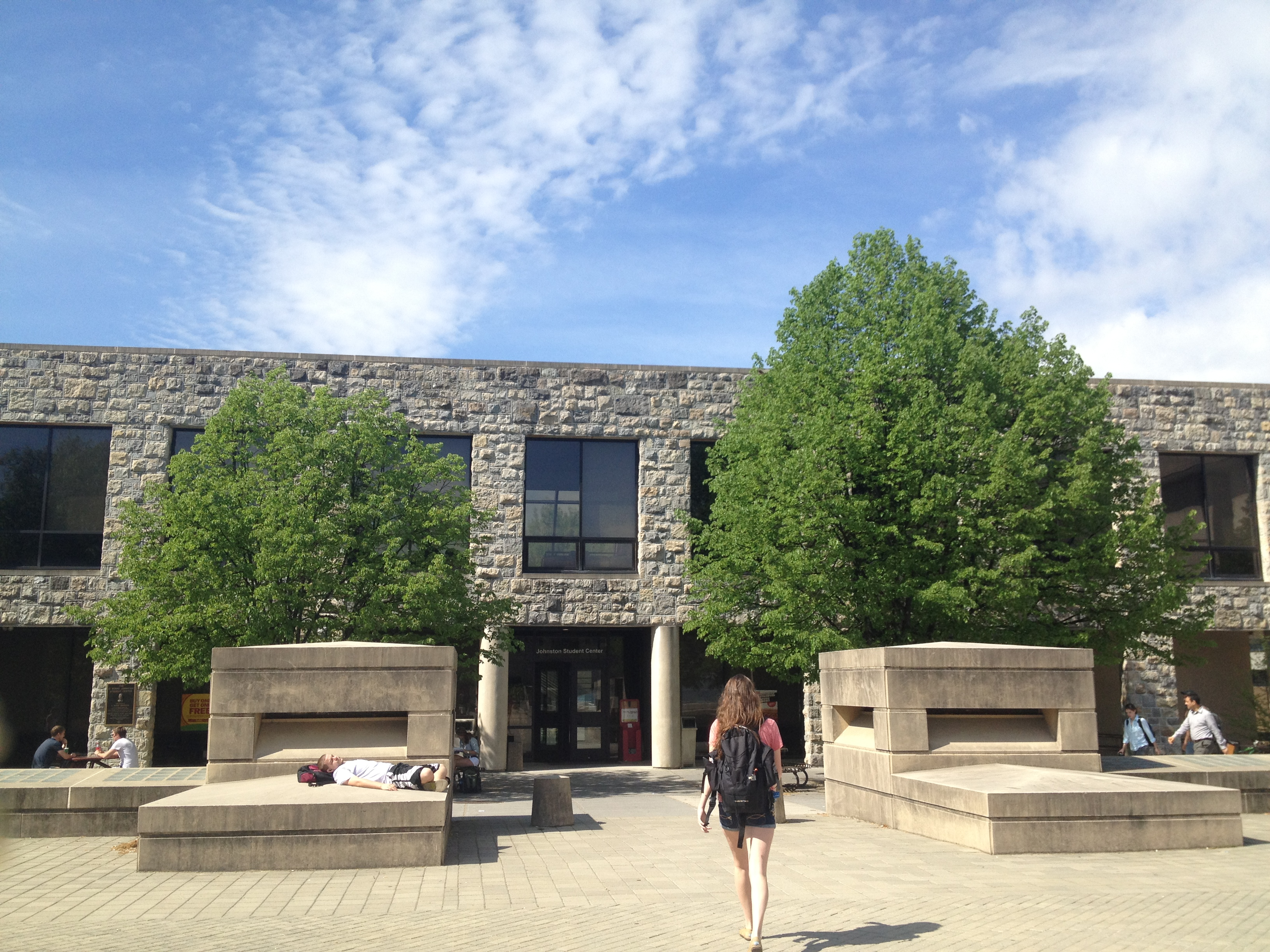
Johnston Student Center

=== G. Burke Johnston Student Center ===
The G. Burke Johnston Student Center (most commonly called GBJ) contains student activities rooms also used as classrooms during the day, a Subway food court, and study areas. The Add Caldwell Lounge is located on the upper level, named for Virginia Tech's first student, Addison Caldwell. On the bottom floor of this three-story building is the entrance to the Pamplin tunnel, which connects this building with the adjacent Pamplin Hall; there is also a bridge on the third floor connecting it to Burruss Hall.

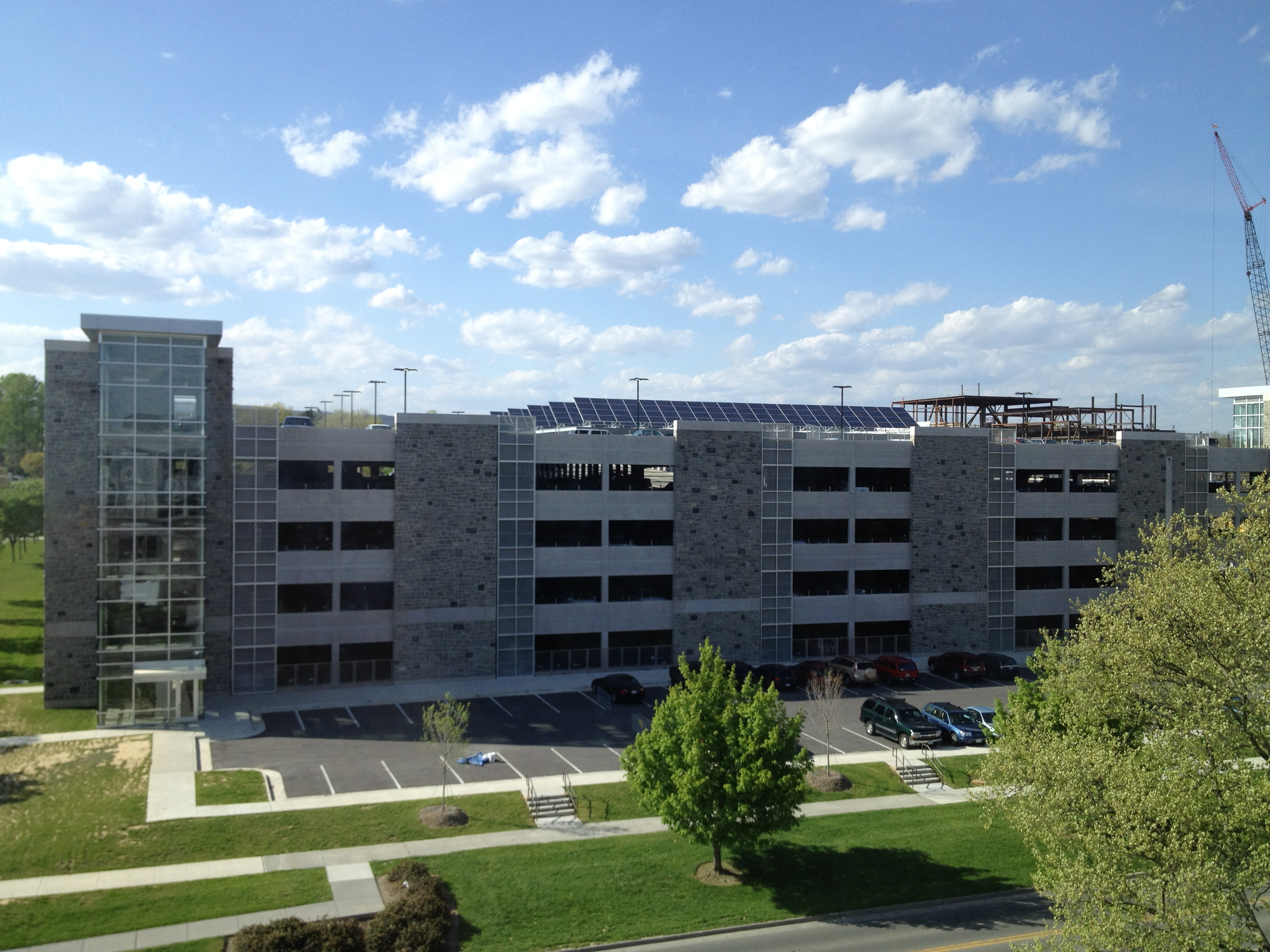
Perry Street Parking Deck

=== Perry Street Parking Deck ===
Completed in 2010, the Perry Street Parking Deck is a five-level parking deck that can accommodate 1,300 vehicles. Parking Services now maintains a satellite located on the first floor of the parking deck. In the spring of 2012, a $1.2 million project, funded through the American Recovery and Reinvestment Act (ARRA) of 2009, installed 480 solar panels on top of the parking deck. The solar panels cover an area of 16,000 square feet and are expected to generate about 136,000 kilowatt-hours annually, or about 13% of the total parking deck's power usage.

=== Power plant ===
A campus landmark, the power plant is located across Old Turner Street from the upper quad. Its 180-foot (55 m) chimney can be seen from many places throughout Blacksburg. The plant is a cogeneration facility that provides electricity, heat and steam for the campus.

=== Other miscellaneous buildings ===
- Alumni Hall
- Armory
- Cranwell International Center
- The Grove (President's Residence)
- Health and Safety Building
- Henderson Hall (formerly the President's Residence from 1876 to 1902)
- Information/Visitors Center
- McComas Hall
- Media Building
- Moss Arts Center (formerly Shultz Dining Hall)
- Price House (razed 2005)
- Smith House
- Solitude
- Squires Student Center
- Student Services Building
- University Bookstore
- University Club (razed 2018)
- Wallace Annex (formerly the Home Management House)
- War Memorial Chapel
- War Memorial Gymnasium
- Wright House

== Non-building campus landmarks ==
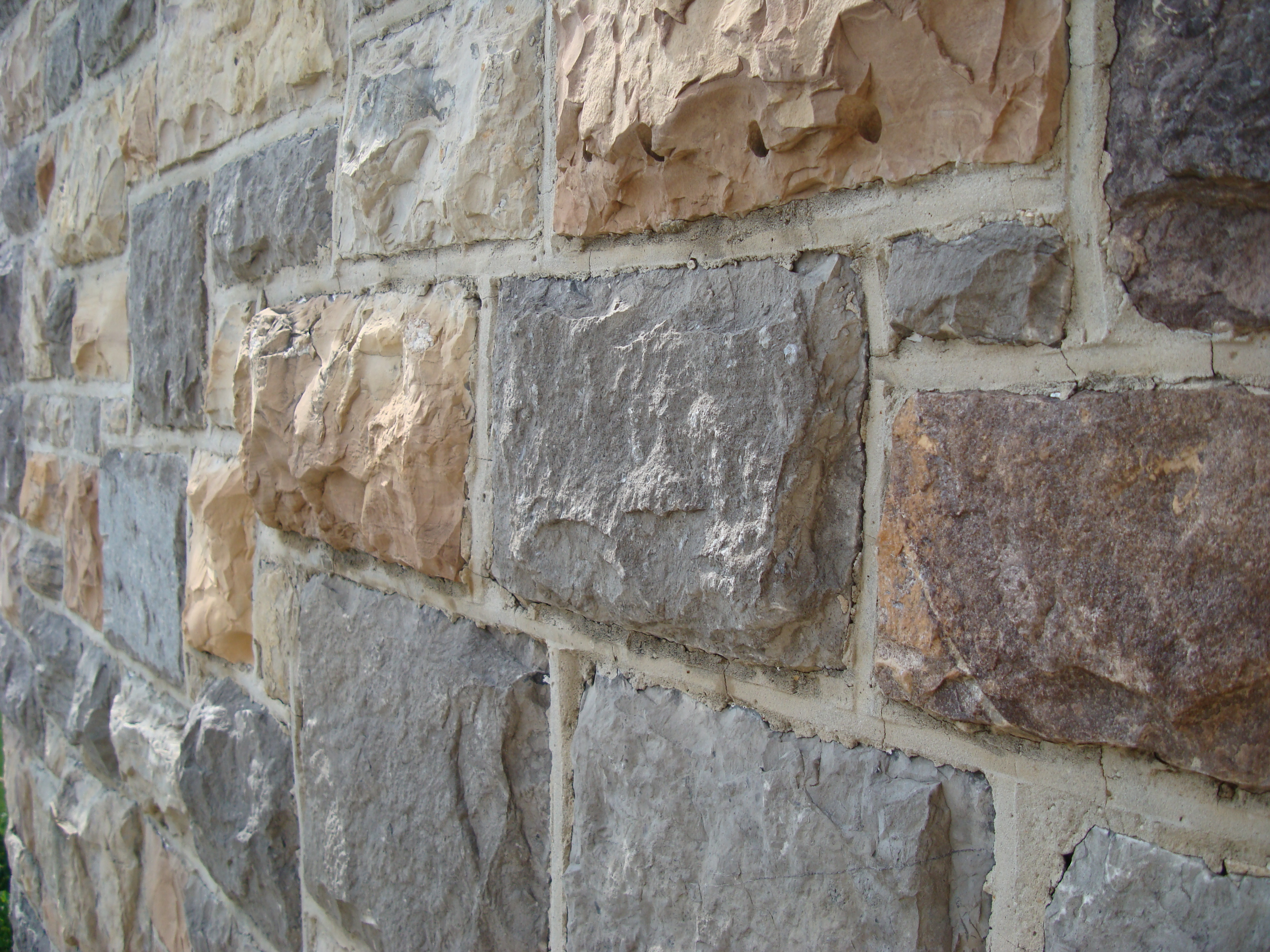
Hokie Stone on O'Shaughnessy Hall

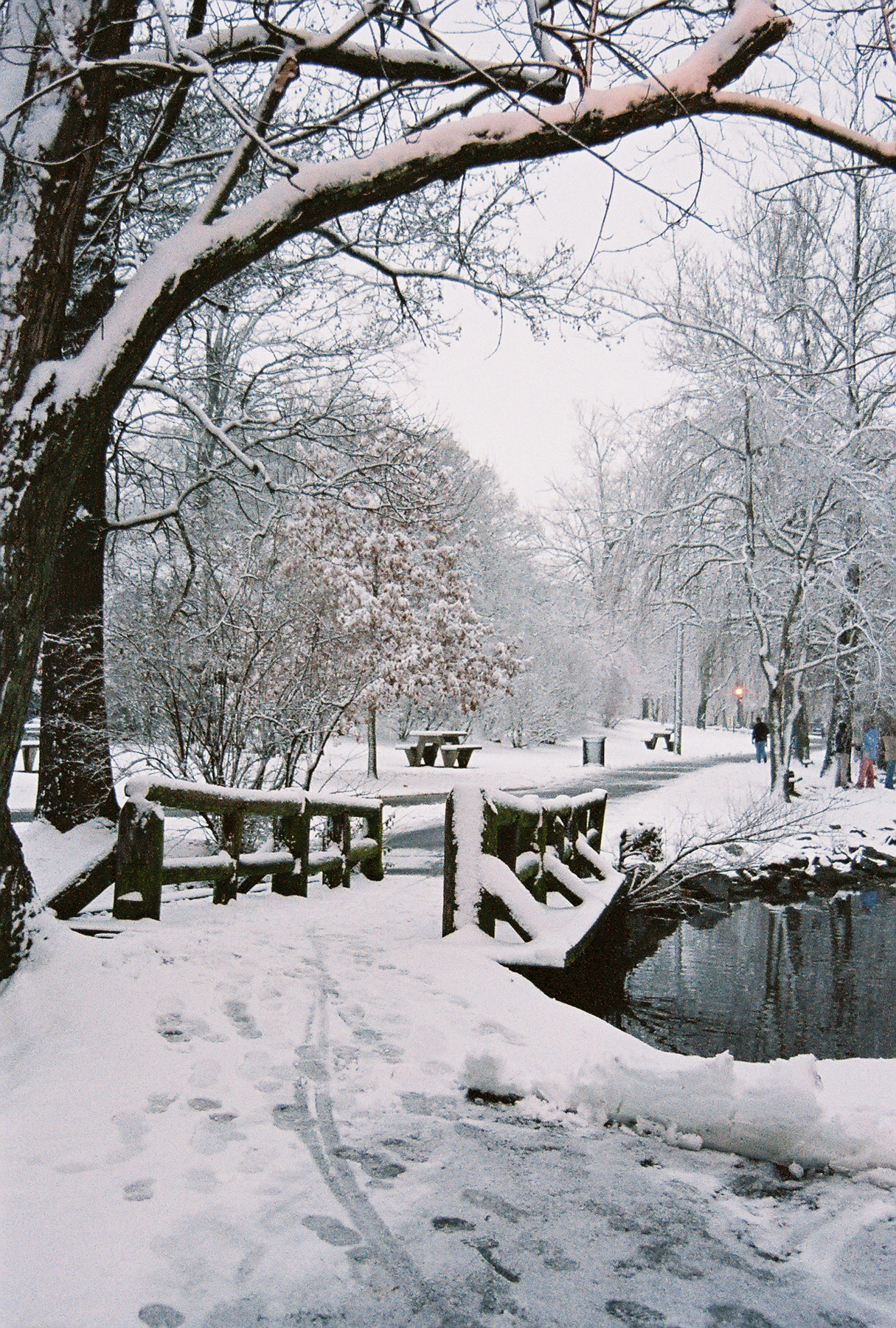
The Duck Pond

=== Hokie Stone ===
On the Blacksburg campus, the majority of the buildings incorporate Hokie Stone as a building material. Hokie Stone is a medley of different-colored limestone, often including dolomite. Each block of Hokie Stone is some combination of gray, brown, black, pink, orange, and maroon. The limestone is mined from various quarries in Southwestern Virginia, Tennessee, and Alabama, one of which has been operated by the university since the 1950s.

=== The Duck Pond ===
The Duck Pond is a man-made water feature created in the 1930s, situated along the northwest portion of the Blacksburg campus. The most notable feature is a gazebo located on its south side connected to picnic and seating areas by pedestrian pathways. It is adjacent to Solitude, a Greek-revival home built in the early 1800s, the oldest structure on campus.

=== Gargoyles ===
There are 14 gargoyles which appear on Tech buildings, especially older buildings. They appear on Smyth, Hillcrest, Saunders, and Eggleston Halls. Although some, like those on the Eggleston archway, are functional, the majority are merely ornamental. Among the more distinctive gargoyles on campus are the "cowgoyles" seen on some agricultural buildings.

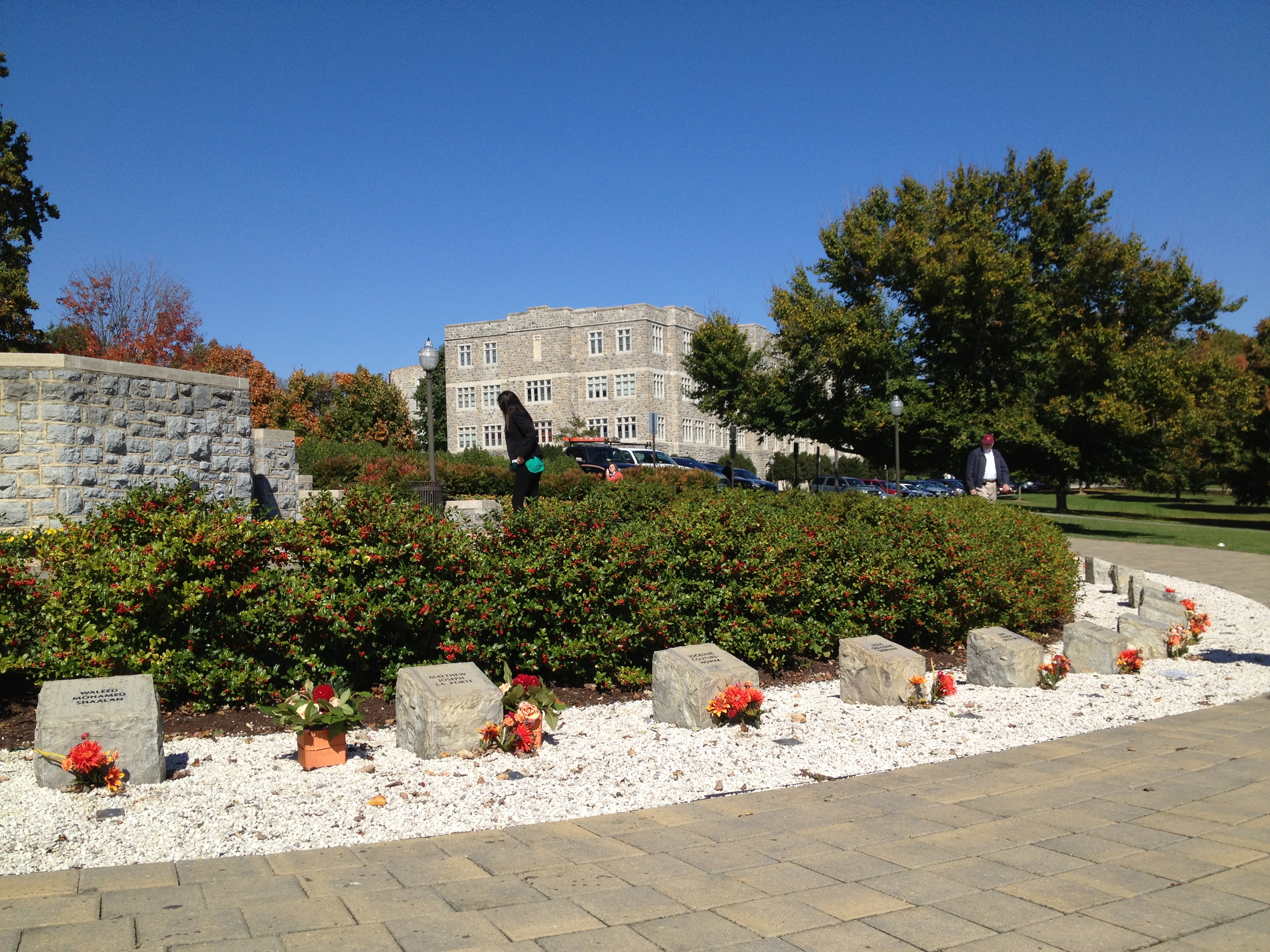
April 16 Memorial

=== April 16 Memorial ===
The April 16 Memorial is located in the center of the side of the Drillfield in front of Burruss Hall. The memorial consists of 32 Hokie Stones, one for each victim, and a stone in the center to honor all of the fallen and injured victims. On the night of April 16, 2007, students placed pieces of Hokie Stone in a semi-circle at the base of the reviewing stand overlooking the Drillfield, and this then led to the creation of the present-day memorial.

== National Capital Region and branch campus centers ==
Virginia Tech's presence in the National Capital Region is continually expanding. Current locations include Alexandria, Arlington, Fairfax, Falls Church, Leesburg, Manassas, and Middleburg. The university also has several commonwealth branch campus centers: Hampton Roads (Virginia Beach), Richmond, Roanoke, and the Southwest Virginia Higher Education Center in Abingdon. The university also owns the Center for European Studies and Architecture in Ticino, Switzerland.

== See also ==
- Virginia Polytechnic Institute and State University
- Virginia Tech shooting
- Murder of Yang Xin
