= VTCC =

VTCC may refer to:

- Chiang Mai International Airport (ICAO airport code)
- Virginia Tech Corps of Cadets, the military component of the student body at Virginia Polytechnic Institute and State University
