= Skipper (cannon) =

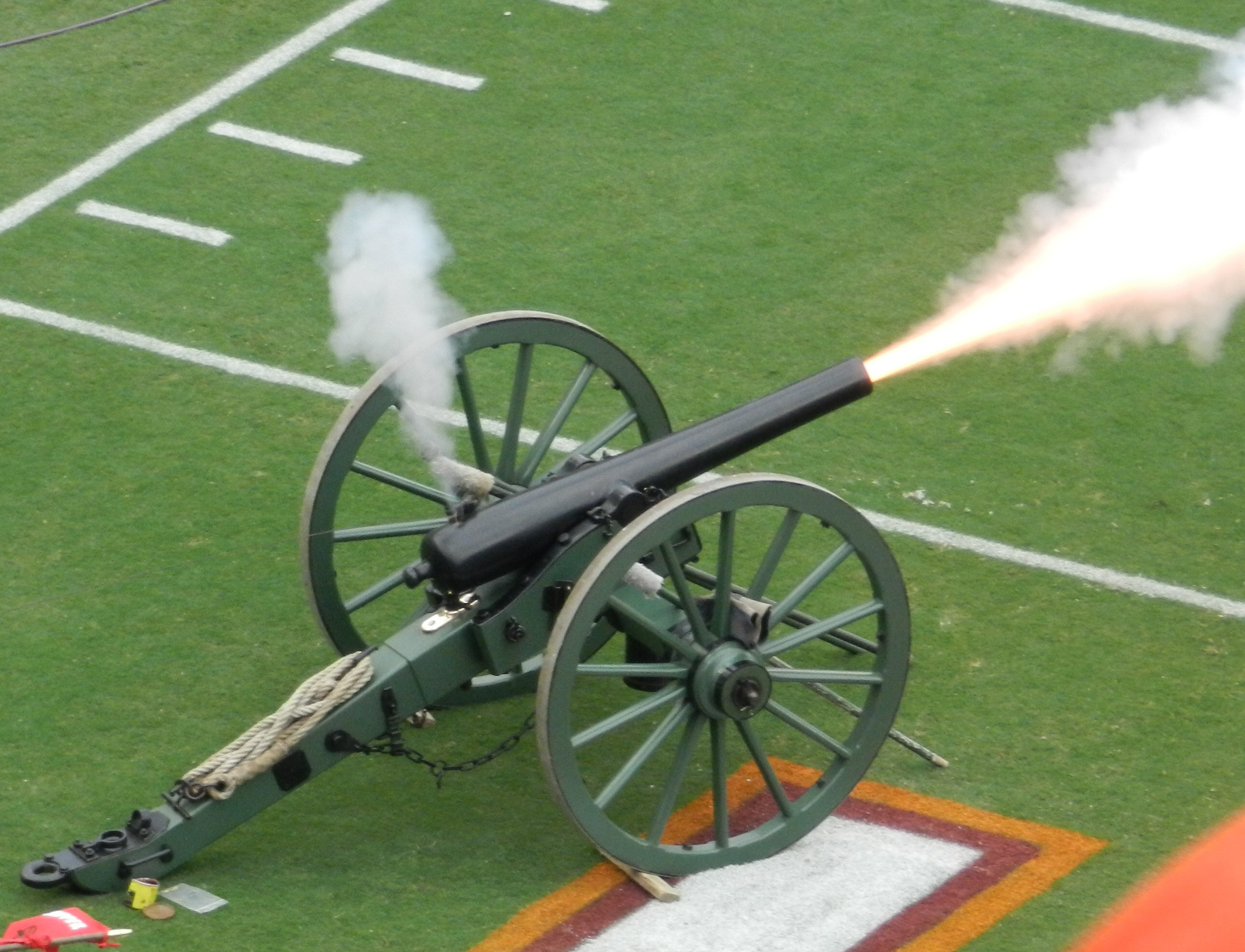
- "Skipper" is fired at every home football game, during pre-game ceremonies (photo) and after every score.
- Type: Virginia Tech game cannon
- Place of origin: United States

Service history
- In service: Skipper:1963-1982; Skipper II:1984-present
- Used by: Virginia Tech Corps of Cadets
- Wars: Autumn Weekends, Commonwealth Clash

Production history
- Designer: Homer Hickam
- Designed: 1963 (c1860 Civil War replica)
- Manufacturer: Virginia Foundry Co.; Lorton Reformatory
- Produced: Skipper:1963; Skipper II:1984
- No. built: 2
- Variants: marking: 'VTCC 1964 - 65 - 66 - 67'

Specifications
- Mass: 1000 lbs (Skipper II: 800 lbs)
- Length: Skipper II: 70 in.
- Width: n/a
- Height: n/a
- Diameter: 6" (Skipper II: 3")
- Crew: "Skipper Crew" - (10 cadet team)

"Skipper" is the name of the Virginia Tech Corps of Cadets' cannon that is sounded at home football games and other events. The game cannon was created by a group of cadets in 1963 for Virginia Tech football games and special events.

== Background ==
=== Corps of Cadets ===
Virginia Polytechnic Institute And State University (Virginia Tech) was founded in 1872 as a military school, originally named, Virginia Agricultural and Mechanical College (VAMC). Since the end of World War II, Virginia Tech's students have been primarily civilians, although the Virginia Tech Corps of Cadets has maintained a strong presence on campus, carrying on the rich military traditions of the school. Virginia Tech is one of six universities with an active cadet corps on campus, outside of the four service academies, and is designated as a senior military college.

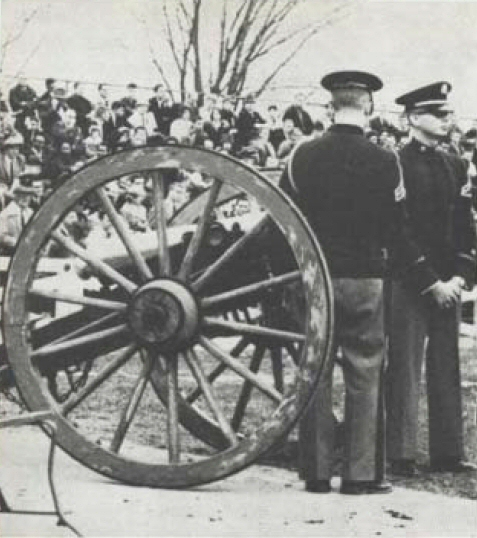
Skipper in its inaugural 1963 game: a 35–20 Win over VMI. (Cadets Pictured are Homer Hickam (L) and Butch Harper (R).

=== Thanksgiving Day rivalry game ===
Virginia Tech (VPI) and Virginia Military Institute (VMI) first played each other in 1894, and annually from 1913 to 1971, on Thanksgiving Day at Victory Stadium in Roanoke, Virginia. The official name of Virginia Tech until 1969 was "Virginia Polytechnic Institute", commonly referred to as "VPI". The football game, known as the "Military Classic of the South" was part of a full day of festivities, including a parade from downtown Roanoke to Victory Stadium for the game. The cadets from VPI and VMI both marched in the parade. After the teams completed formation in the stadium, VMI fired its game cannon, named "Little John" and chanted, "Where's your cannon!?!" directed at the VPI side of the stadium. VPI had no response.

In 1962, two juniors in the Alpha Company of the Virginia Tech Corps of Cadets, Alton "Butch" Harper and Homer "Sonny" Hickam, made a solemn pact to have a reply for VMI in 1963 and build the 'largest game cannon in the world.'

== Making Skipper ==
=== Planning and funding ===
The cadets formulated a strategic plan for making the cannon in time for the big game. The biggest task was fundraising since the school administration declined to be directly involved. The 1700 cadets would somehow have to come up with the money themselves. To make things slightly easier, Harper was named to the Regimental Staff, allowing him direct access to alumni to ask for donations. Meanwhile, Hickam became an officer in A Squadron. Also, George Fox, another friend from A Squadron, volunteered to help.

Hickam resourcefully procured authentic blueprints for a Civil War-style cannon barrel. The cadets planned to make a wooden mock-up of a mold for the barrel with assistance from the college of mechanical engineering. The industrial engineering department took the mock-up on as a class project. The full-scale mold became an essential marketing tool for earning the support of the cadets.

Hickam, Harper, and Fox held sixteen 'show & tell' type meetings where the mold was exhibited and explained to every cadet in every company and squadron on campus. At the end of the meetings, every cadet was asked to donate one dollar or whatever he could give. Enthusiasm and support within the Corps grew with each meeting. The success of the mission would depend upon the cadets' passion as much as their pennies. In recognition, the face of the barrel is marked "VTCC 1964-65-66-67" to honor of all of the class years at the time.

Through their planning, perseverance and effort, three cadets managed to earn the support of the entire Corps of Cadets, its alumni, and faculty.

=== Design, Construction and Naming ===
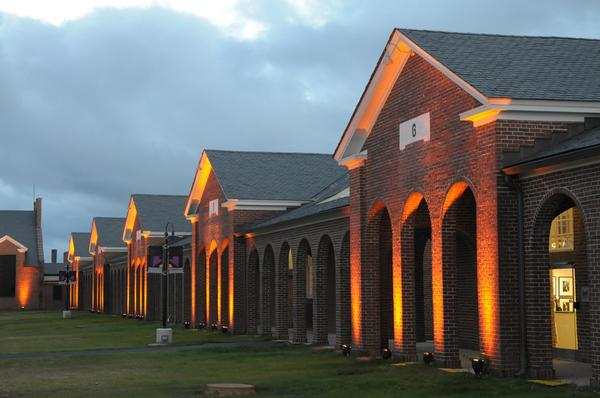
The Lorton Reformatory workshops, where "Skipper's" carriage was fabricated in 1963

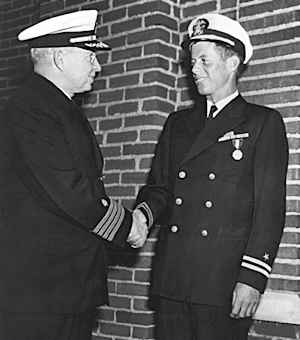
Skipper's namesake, PT boat captain, "Skipper" John F. Kennedy

==== The Barrel ====
Due to its superior characteristics, brass was chosen for the barrel. The cadets were requested to donate whatever brass they could scavenge including: brass breastplates, belt buckles, and hat grommets. Large brass gears were obtained from a coal mine in Coalwood, West Virginia where Hickam's father was the superintendent. The cadets also retrieved spent brass bullet shell casings from the school's firing range.

Arrangements were made to have the barrel made at the Virginia Foundry Company in Roanoke, Virginia. The foundry's president, Paul Huffman was sworn to secrecy and when the cadets asked about the casting price, he replied "You don't have enough, but I'm a member of the Corps Class of '37 and VPI has needed a cannon for a long time. We'll be making that barrel for you for nothing. Just blow the heck out of them for us, will ya!?"

The cadets brought the brass and wooden mold to the foundry for Huffman to cast the barrel. Huffman called a few days later to report a minor setback. It appeared that not all of the shell casings from the firing range were empty. When the brass was poured into the vat for melting, a series of small explosions erupted, sending everyone ducking for cover from the sound of gunfire. Thankfully, the only "casualties" were the walls of the foundry. As a precaution, Huffman replaced the remaining casings with navy gun metal brass from the foundry's stock, which was stronger and safer than the brass the cadets had collected.

==== The Carriage ====
Once everything was sent to the foundry for the barrel, the cadets focused on finding a means for transporting the new artillery. They located a woodworking shop that specialized in era-appropriate, Civil War gun carriages at Lorton Reformatory, near Washington D.C. The shop had created authentic wooden artillery carriages for local National Battlefield Parks, such as Gettysburg Battlefield. All of the money saved from the donated barrel went to pay for Skipper's carriage and the difference was paid by the State of Virginia.

On Nov. 22, 1963, less than a week before the VMI game, the cadets rented a truck to pick up the cannon. Upon arriving in Roanoke, all of the foundry company workers were on hand to proudly present the brass barrel to the cadets, shaking their hands and cheering them off to pick up the carriage in Lorton. After a long ride across the state, they found the reformatory to be a lot less inviting, but the carriage was ready nonetheless. It took the entire group to load the carriage into the truck and they started the trek home, excited to show the Corps of Cadets its new cannon. Shortly after leaving Lorton, the group learned over the radio that President Kennedy had been shot. They continued home with dampened spirits, only to learn he had died before they returned to Blacksburg, pre-empting any type of celebratory reception awaiting them on campus.

==== Naming the cannon ====
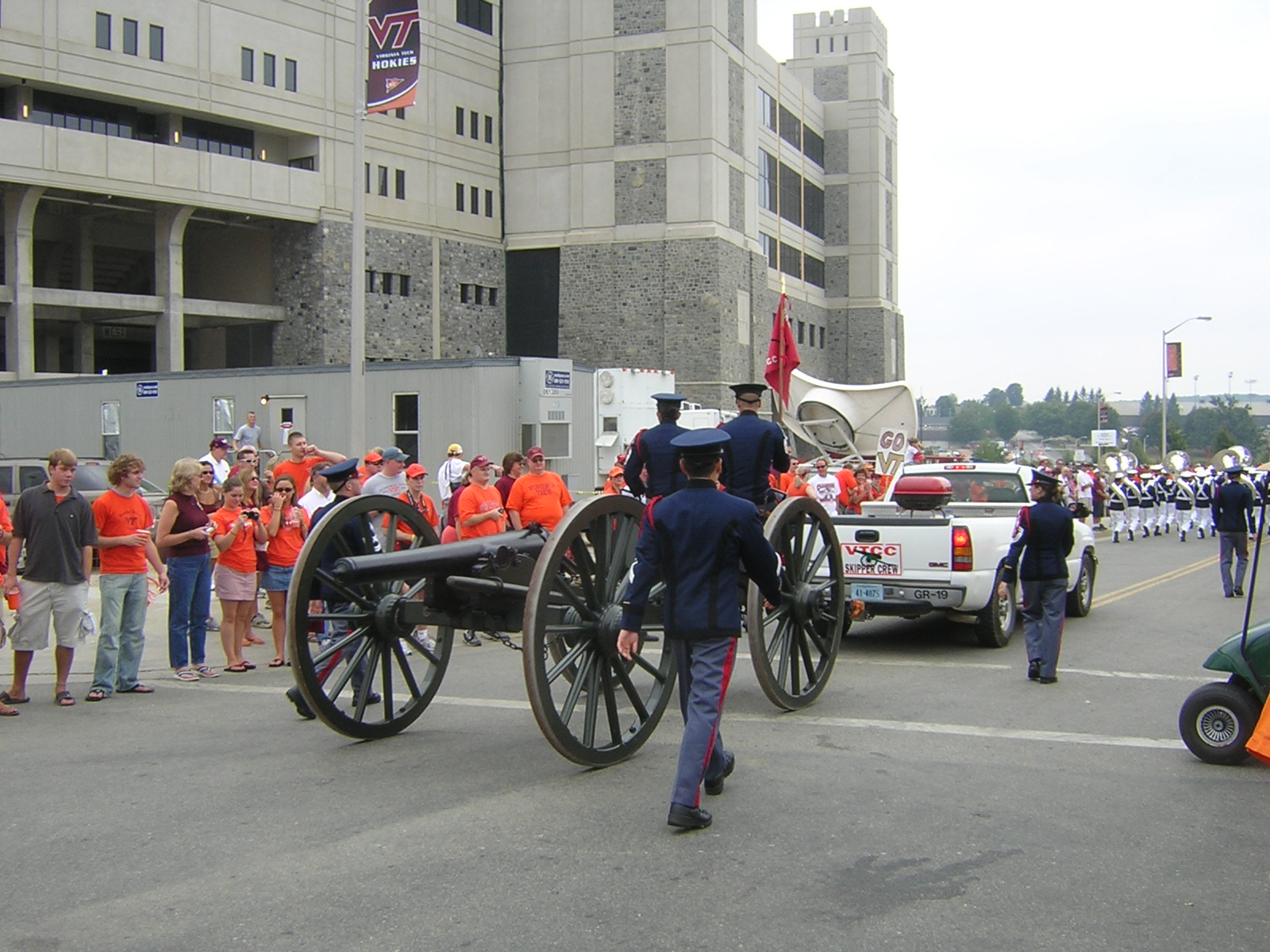
Skipper Crew with Skipper at Lane Stadium on game day.(c.2010)

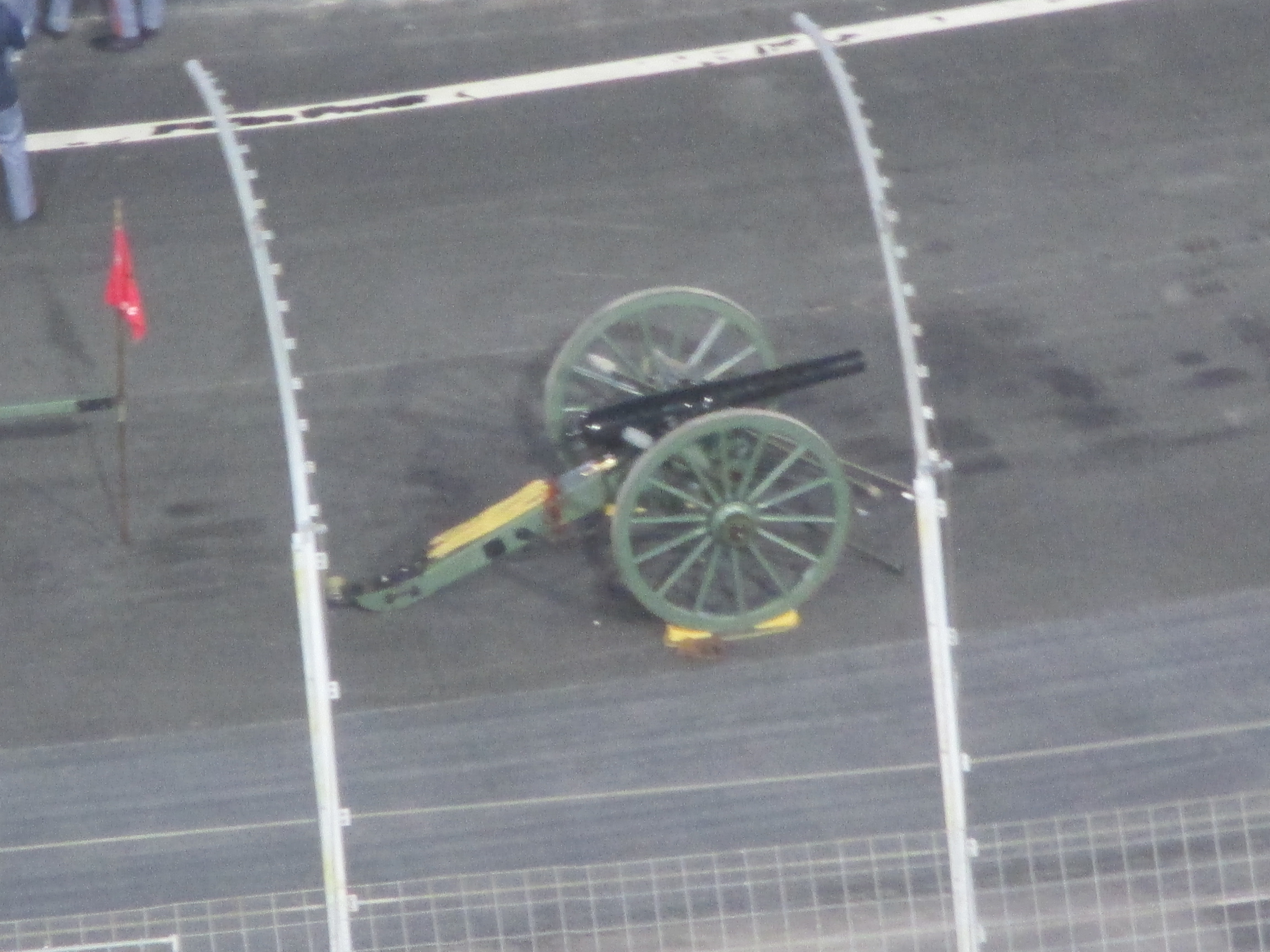
Skipper at the Battle of Bristol (2016)

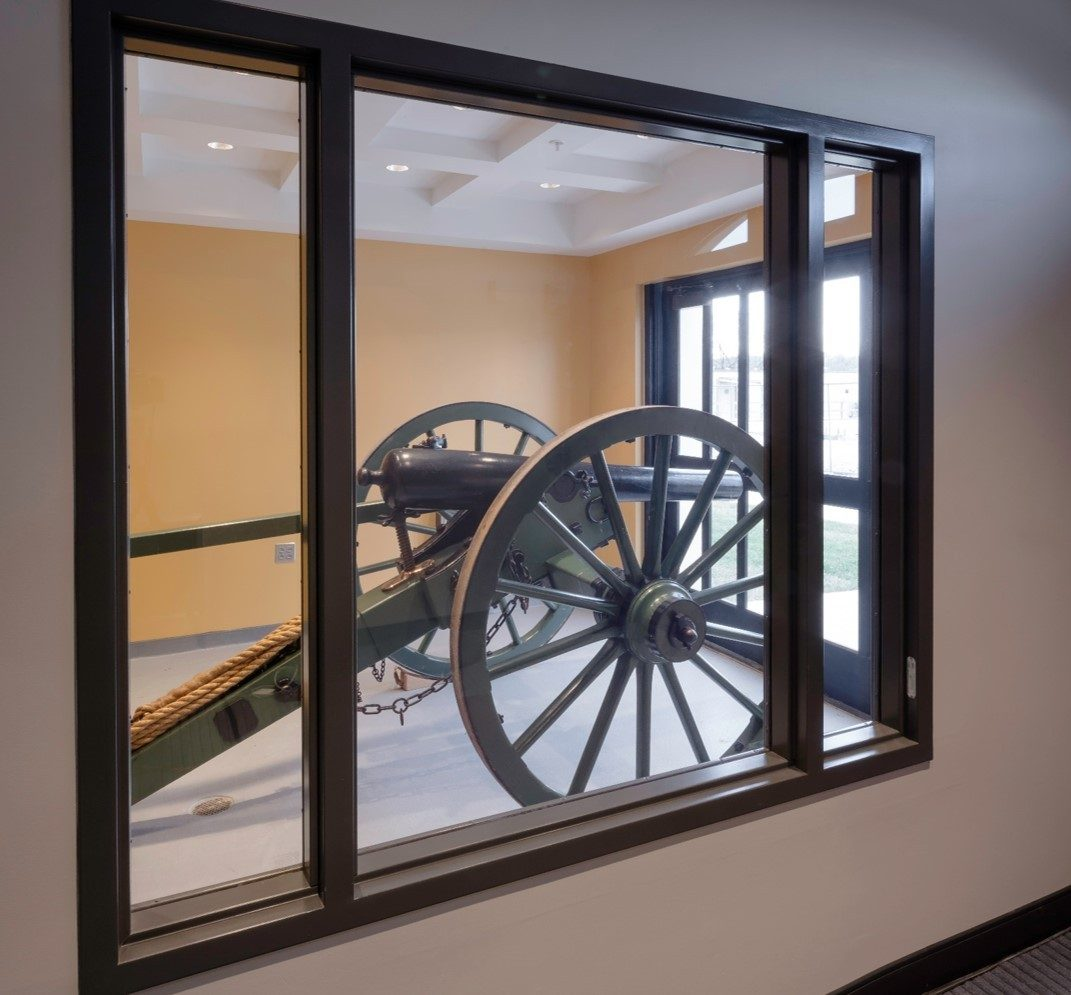
Skipper's quarters ("The Cave") in Pearson Hall East (2015)

A few suggestion of naming the cannon after former Corps of Cadet war heroes such as: "The Major Williams Memorial Cannon" were considered but it was decided that the cannon would be named in honor of recently assassinated President, John F. Kennedy. JFK's legacy and naval background became the inspiration for the naming of the cannon. In his career with the Navy, Kennedy was the captain, or "Skipper", of a PT boat during World War II. Additionally, the name "Skipper" had a meaning within the Corps itself. It was the traditional title for a senior private, a senior without any stripes. Harper and Hickam decided that the cannon would be named Skipper, to honor both JFK and the Corps of Cadets.

== Testing and Firing Skipper ==
=== Testing and Salute to JFK ===
The Virginia Tech campus golf course was chosen as the first test site for Skipper. Although Hickam had extensive experience with rockets, none of the cadets knew how to fire a cannon. To make matters more challenging, a fuse hole had not been drilled in the barrel at the foundry. The cadets filled scavenged plastic ketchup and mustard squeeze bottles with black gunpowder for the charges, topped with an ordinary cherry bomb for the fuse.

The first public firing of Skipper was on the lawn of Brodie and Rasche Halls. The formal exhibition was held to both test the barrel's strength and to salute the Virginia Tech Corps of Cadets. Coincidentally, all military installations traditionally give a 50 gun salute to a fallen U.S. president. So, the first true firing of Skipper was a fifty-round salute to President Kennedy. The cadets' tireless efforts were rewarded as they witnessed Skipper's first performance in front of the entire Corps of Cadets with an emotional fifty-round salute to JFK.

=== The 1963 Thanksgiving Day game ===
Skipper made its game day debut on Thanksgiving Day, November 28, 1963, when VMI and VPI met for the annual rivalry football game, also known as the "Military Classic of the South". There had been some speculation that the game might be cancelled due to Kennedy's assassination, but it proceeded as scheduled. Before the game, the announcer asked for a minute of silence for President Kennedy.

Prior to the game, the cadets hid the cannon in the stadium. After the VMI cadets chanted, "Where's your Cannon?!?" fifty Virginia Tech cadets emerged from under the bleachers, pulling the 1,000 pound cannon with two heavy ropes. As Skipper entered the stadium, the Highty-Tighties played, "The Parade of the Charioteers", a grand song from the movie, Ben Hur. They strategically positioned Skipper on the field and shot it directly at the opposing sidelines. Cadets hats were blown off and football players nearby were almost knocked over. The VMI corps became silent and never chanted again.

Skipper was fired after every Virginia Tech score; a tradition that remains today. After one touchdown, late in the game, the cadets gave Skipper a triple-charge, which sent a shock wave across the field and through the stands, cracking the plate glass windows in the press box. The public address announcer and a nearby policeman immediately directed the cadets to aim Skipper away from the press box. The Hokies won the game 35–20.

=== 1982 blowout and retirement ===
After 19 years of service, Skipper suffered a catastrophic blowout after the Military Ball in February,1982, and its barrel was retired. Skipper's original brass barrel has been preserved and is currently on permanent display in the lobby of Pearson Hall since September, 2017. The barrel had previously been exhibited at the Holtzman Alumni Center Museum on Virginia Tech's campus beginning in 2005.

== Replacing Skipper ==
=== Skipper II ===
In 1984, Paul Huffman Jr., a 1978 graduate from the Virginia Tech materials engineering department, and son of Skipper's original maker, Paul Huffman Sr., eagerly volunteered to design and make a replacement cannon at no charge. Skipper's original carriage was serviceable, so focusing on the barrel design, Huffman traveled to Gettysburg Battlefield for research and selected a Confederate iron rifle to replicate. Its design compares to a 3-inch ordnance rifle, which is 70 inches long and weighs about 800 pounds. Huffman solicited nearby New River Valley tradesmen for help and they were more than willing to assist. The companies donated materials and helped to make the new cannon, which became known as, "Skipper II".

Skipper II debuted at the homecoming game at Lane Stadium in October, 1984, nearly 21 years after the original Skipper first sounded. Skipper II was designed and constructed to be much more durable than Skipper and has been in operation since the mid-1980s. Other than regular maintenance, Skipper II has persevered, receiving just a few minor repairs in 2010. Although the official title of the cannon is "Skipper II", it is commonly referred to simply as "Skipper".

In 2010, During the Wake Forest home game, Skipper suffered a minor setback when a primer became stuck causing a malfunction and preventing the cannon from being fired. After a minor repair, Skipper was back in action a short time later.

In 2015, Skipper was issued its very own quarters in the newly constructed cadet dorm, now called Pearson Hall East. Skipper's home is often referred to as the "Cave." The glass enclosure is situated in a highly visible location in the Upper Quad, adjacent to Pearson Hall East's main lobby and easily accessible for all students, alumni, and visitors to admire Skipper between home games and during the off-season.

== Skipper's Legacy ==
Since 1963, Skipper has been fired after every Virginia Tech score at every home football game. Until 1965, Virginia Tech home games were played on campus at Miles Stadium. Since then, home games have been played at Lane Stadium. Beginning in 2014, Skipper has been on hand to sound the start of festivities at the "Hokie Village", a family oriented tailgate located near the stadium at all home games.

=== Skipper Crew ===
'Skipper Crew' is the name given to the unit responsible for the care-taking, maintenance, and operations of Skipper. The team consists of seventeen sophomore and junior cadets, led by the gun captain. After a corps-wide reorganization in the 1970s, and through the 1990s, the Skipper Crew consisted mostly of members of Company F. In the 1990s, cadets not originally from Company F were frequently rotated into the Skipper Crew after sophomore year. Today, upperclassmen choose new member of Skipper crew through a "tap" process. Candidates study the history of the cannon and all aspects of its caretaking and operation. The skipper crew selects their underclassmen successors in a designated ceremony at the end of the highly selective "tap" process. Both Skipper and Skipper Crew are among the most recognizable symbols of both the Corps of Cadets and Virginia Tech.

=== Caldwell March ===
Skipper is sounded at the conclusion of the Caldwell March, a traditional hike by freshman cadets every fall and spring semester. Each leg is 13 miles commemorating the journey made by Addison Caldwell, Virginia Tech's first student from his farm in Craig County. Former cadet and skipper's builder, Homer Hickam has joined the March on some occasions.

=== Milestones ===
On Oct. 31, 2014, the Corps of Cadets held a 50-year anniversary celebration for Skipper in Burruss Hall auditorium. Hickam, Harper, and Fox were present for the celebration, which was followed by a 21-gun salute by Skipper II on the Drillfield at the center of campus.

On September 10, 2016, for the first time in its history, Skipper traveled outside the Commonwealth of Virginia for the Battle at Bristol, the kickoff game against the University of Tennessee Volunteers. It was played on the infield at Bristol Motor Speedway in Bristol, Tennessee in front of 156,990 people, the largest audience to ever watch a college football game.

=== Publications ===
2021: The story of the making of "Skipper" is detailed in the 2021 memoir by Homer Hickam titled, "Don't Blow Yourself Up". The book chronicles Hickam's life after high school, including his years as a student at Virginia Tech in the early 1960s when he, and some fellow cadets made "Skipper"
