= Earle Davis Gregory =

American soldier (1897–1972)

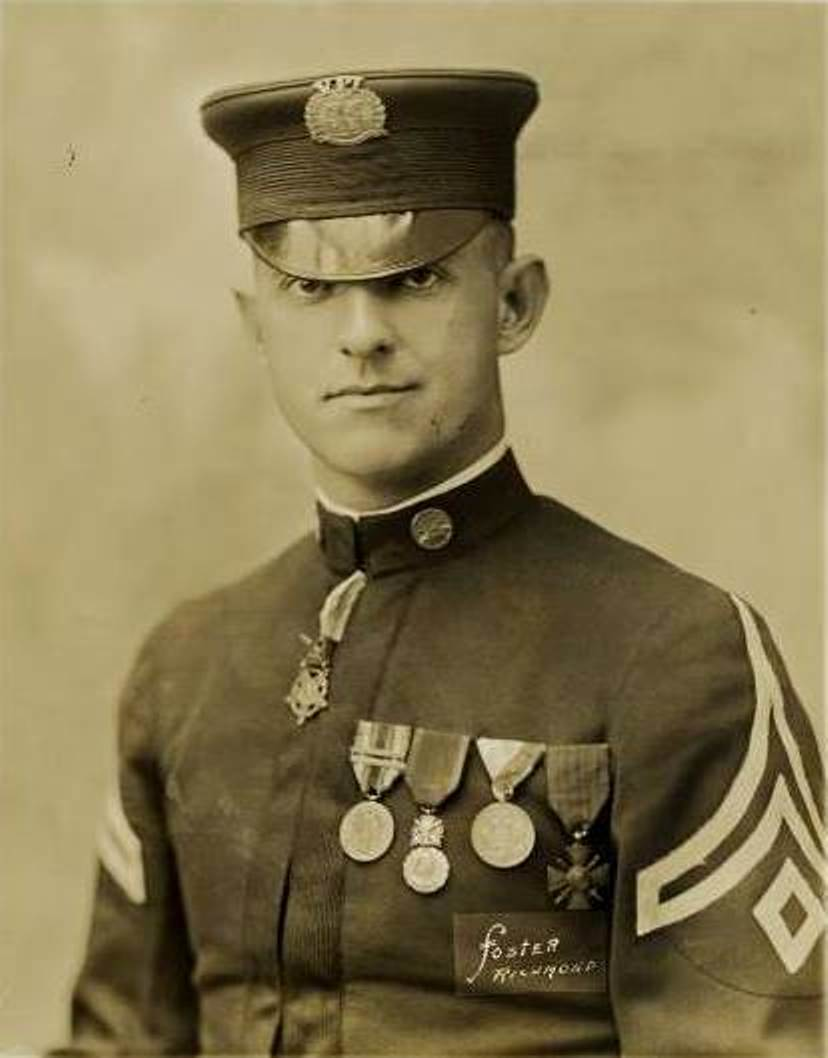
- Earle D. Gregory (Photographed while a VPI cadet)
- Born: October 18, 1897; Clayville, Virginia, U.S.
- Died: January 6, 1972 (aged 74); Tuscaloosa, Alabama, U.S.
- Burial place: Tuscaloosa Memorial Park, Tuscaloosa, Alabama
- Military career
- Allegiance: United States of America
- Branch: United States Army
- Rank: Sergeant
- Service number: 1290053
- Units: Headquarters Company, 116th Infantry, 29th Division
- Conflicts: World War I Meuse–Argonne offensive
- Awards: Medal of Honor; Purple Heart; Mexican Border Service Medal; World War I Victory Medal; Légion d'honneur (French Republic); Médaille militaire (French Republic); Croix de guerre (French Republic); Croce al Merito di Guerra (Italy); Medal for Military Bravery (Kingdom of Montenegro)

Earle Davis Gregory (October 18, 1897 – January 6, 1972) was an American soldier and World War I Medal of Honor recipient for his heroic actions in 1918 during the Meuse-Argonne Offensive in France.

== Biography ==
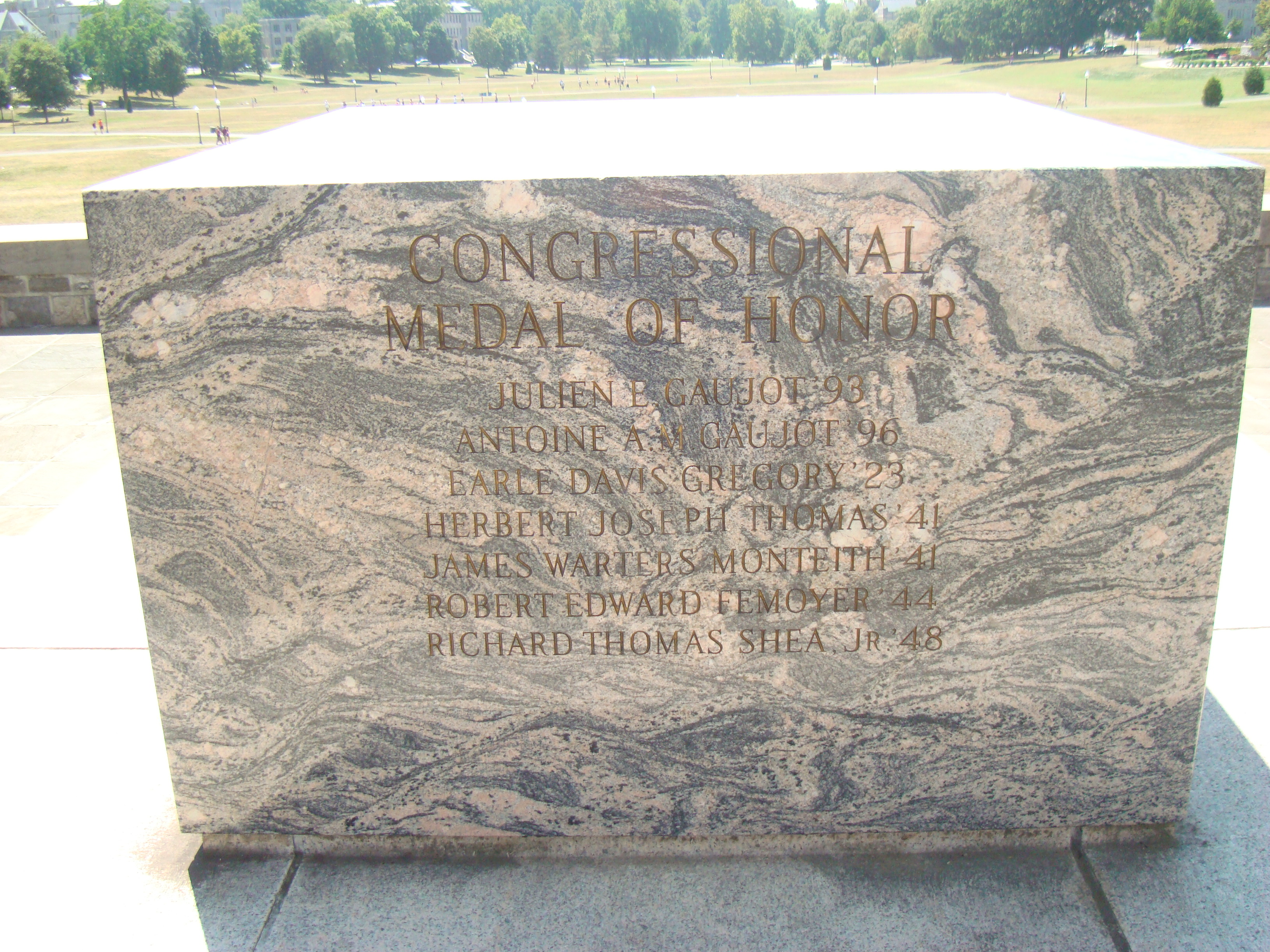
Gregory's name on the Virginia Tech's MOH Cenotaph.

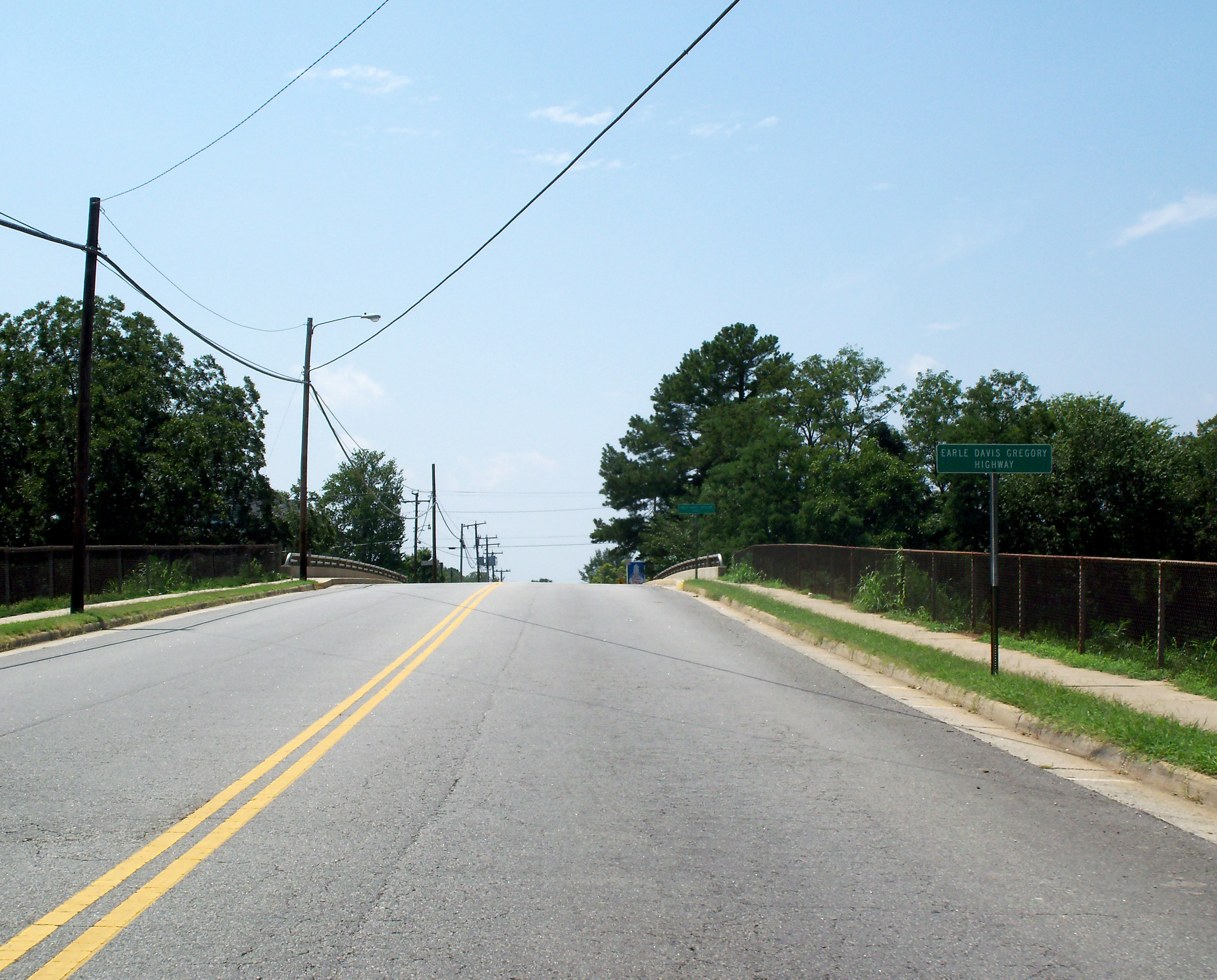
A stretch of highway in Chase City which bears Gregory's name

Earle Davis Gregory was born in Chase City, Virginia on October 18, 1897. Gregory was also raised there and graduated from Fork Union Military Academy.

He entered Virginia Polytechnic Institute in 1919, graduating with the Class of 1923. While at VPI, he studied Electrical Engineering. During his senior year, he served as Alpha company commander and President of the Corps of Cadets. He was voted Most Popular Cadet by his peers during his senior year.

=== Military service ===
He enlisted at Chase City, Virginia in the U.S. Army during World War I. Gregory received the Medal of Honor for actions as a U.S. Army sergeant during the Meuse–Argonne offensive in the final weeks of the war. He is considered to be the first Virginian to receive the medal and often called the Sergeant York of Virginia.

On October 8, 1918, Sgt Earl D. Gregory at Bois-de-Consenvoye, north of Verdun, France, seized a rifle and trench-mortar shell, which he used as a hand grenade. Shouting "I will get them", he left his detachment of the trench-mortar platoon, and advancing ahead of the infantry, captured a machine gun and three of the enemy. Advancing still farther from the machinegun nest, he captured a 7.5-centimeter mountain howitzer and, entering a dugout in the immediate vicinity, single-handedly captured 19 of the enemy. For this act he received the Medal of Honor.

Major General Omar Bundy presented Gregory his medal in a ceremony at Camp Lee, Virginia on April 29, 1919. He was also invested as a Chevalier (Knight) of the French Legion of Honor, and was also awarded the Médaille militaire, Croix de guerre and the Montenegrin Order of Merit for his actions during the Meuse-Argonne Offensive.

=== Later life ===
After his discharge from the Army in 1919, Gregory enrolled in the Virginia Polytechnic Institute (VPI) and graduated in 1923. He pursued a career with the Veterans Administration. On May 2, 1963, he met President John F. Kennedy at the White House.

On January 6, 1972, Gregory died at his home in Tuscaloosa, Alabama and is buried at the Tuscaloosa Memorial Park. His grave can be found in Section 18, Lot 60.

== Military awards ==
Gregory's military decorations and awards include:

1st row	Medal of Honor	Purple Heart	Mexican Border Service Medal
2nd row	World War I Victory Medal w/ two bronze service stars for the Meuse-Argonne and Defensive Sector battle clasps	Ordre national de la Légion d'honneur Degree of Knight (French Republic)	Médaille militaire (French Republic)
3nd row	Croix de guerre 1914–1918 w/bronze palm (French Republic)	Croce al Merito di Guerra (Italy)	Medal for Military Bravery (Kingdom of Montenegro)

Other awards -

- Southern Cross of Honor, 1917-1918 pattern (United Daughters of the Confederacy)
- Veterans of Foreign Wars Membership Insignia (VFW)

=== Medal of Honor Citation ===
General Orders: War Department, General Orders No. 34 (March 7, 1919)

"The President of the United States in the name of The Congress takes pleasure in presenting the Medal of Honor to

SERGEANT EARLE DAVIS GREGORY (ASN: 1290053)
UNITED STATES ARMY

for service as set forth in the following CITATION:

For extraordinary heroism on 8 October 1918, while serving with Headquarters Company, 116th Infantry, 29th Division, in action at Bois-de-Consenvoye, France. With the remark "I will get them," Sergeant Gregory seized a rifle and a trench-mortar shell, which he used as a hand grenade, left his detachment of the trench-mortar platoon, and advancing ahead of the infantry, captured a machinegun and three of the enemy. Advancing still farther from the machinegun nest, he captured a 7.5-centimeter mountain howitzer and, entering a dugout in the immediate vicinity, single-handedly captured 19 of the enemy.

/S/ WOODROW WILSON"

=== The Gregory Guard ===
The Virginia Tech Corps of Cadets precision military marching unit, The Gregory Guard, was named in honor of Sgt Gregory in May 1963. He then left his medals and war papers in the collections to Virginia Tech collection. This is on display to help visitors remember his legacy and understand his importance to his bravery and toughness in the battle of Meuse-Argonne.

== See also ==
- List of Medal of Honor recipients
- List of Medal of Honor recipients for World War I
