= Highty-Tighties =

College military marching band of Virginia Tech

Highty Tighties
- School: Virginia Tech
- Location: Blacksburg, Virginia
- Conference: ACC
- Founded: 1893
- Director: Dr. Matthew Clark, Major (RCAF, Retired) MMM CD
- Members: 140
- Website: vtcc.vt.edu/band.html

The Virginia Tech Regimental Band, also known as the Highty Tighties, VPI Cadet Band, or Band Company was established in 1893 as a military marching band unit in the Virginia Tech Corps of Cadets at Virginia Polytechnic Institute and State University. Virginia Tech also has had since 1974 a non-military marching band, The Marching Virginians.

== History ==
=== Roots of the band ===
Glade Cornet Band, 1884

From 1875 to 1892, the Corps hired civilian bands to provide music when needed. One of the best-known of these groups was the Glade Cornet Band, formed by several Blacksburg townspeople in 1883.

In 1892, corps Commandant John Alexander Harman formed a six-piece drum and bugle corps. One member, Cadet Lieutenant Frank Daniel Wilson, sought out several other cadets with musical experience, and formed an unofficial band. Besides Wilson, the initial musicians included Sergeants Clifford West Anderson, John William Sample, Theodore Graham Lewton, and Lorenzo Montogery Hale; and Privates Harry Woodfin Phillips, William Marshall Watson, Charles Lewis Pedigo, William Rufus Prige, James Archer Walsh, and Robert Beverly Jr. Professor and LtCol Ellison Adger Smyth was also a member of the band and a key figure in establishing the band, as well as the first football team in 1892. Wilson eventually convinced Harman and the board of trustees of the need for a distinct band company, and it was formed in May 1893 with Major James Patton Harvey as the first director and Wilson as the first company commander.

In 1894 the Corps traveled to Richmond for the first time for the unveiling of the Soldiers and Sailors Monument. In 1896, the Band played at the Jefferson Davis Monument dedication in Richmond, Virginia. They were the only band so honored. In 1896, the band, along with the entire corps, traveled to Roanoke, Virginia for the first annual Thanksgiving Day VPI-VMI football game and pre-game parade to the stadium. This tradition continued until 1970, when Virginia Tech and VMI stopped playing in Roanoke. (The final Virginia Tech-VMI football game was played in Norfolk, VA in 1984.)

=== Service in the Spanish–American War ===
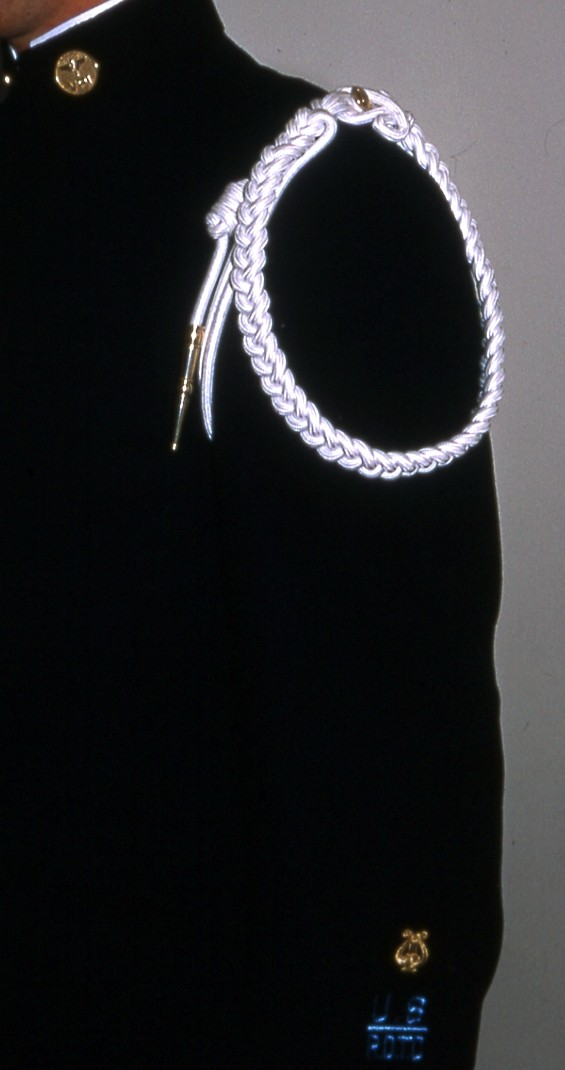
Citation Cord for Spanish–American War Service

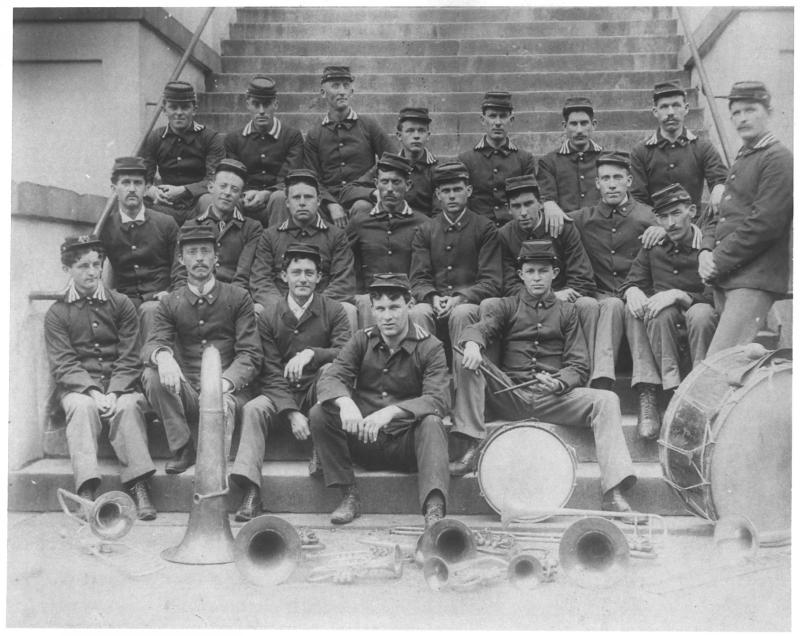
Band of the 2nd Virginia Infantry Volunteers, circa 1890

In 1898, the Band volunteered for duty in the Spanish–American War. The War Department authorized the organization of bands of twenty-four pieces for the volunteer infantry regiments. A Major Shanks wrote to Major Harvey, Director of the VPI Band, requesting him "to prevail upon his Band to join the Second Virginia as its regimental band. The director, Major James Patton Harvey, and 20-members of the band joined some Blacksburg, Virginia townspeople and former bandsmen to form the Regimental band for the US Army's 2nd Virginia Regiment.

Since service specifically as a VPI unit had been denied, along with the lettered units of the Corps, Major Harvey and fifteen cadets of the Band resigned from VPI and enlisted as individuals with the Second Regiment, along with four VPI alumni and five members of the Blacksburg Glade Cornet Band. Major Harvey was appointed Chief Musician and Leader of the new organization. The Second Virginia's new Regimental Band was a VPI organization constituted as an Army unit. The band was to be stationed in Cuba, however the war was over before they were scheduled to leave from Florida. They were called on to play many times during their stay.

The Highty Tighties were presented with the white citation cord in 1936 for meritorious service in the Spanish–American War. According to Band legend, the cord was pinned on the Band commander backward by Eleanor Roosevelt. It has been worn with the braid on the outside ever since. The official university story is that President Burrus presented the citation cord to the band.

During the absence of Major Harvey, Frank Carper became director of the Band during his senior year in 1898.

=== Early history ===
The VPI Cadet Band and Corps of Cadets traveled to several expositions in the early 1900s. In 1901, the band played "The Thunderer" for John Philip Sousa at the Pan-American Exposition in Buffalo, New York. Sousa was so impressed that he dedicated a performance of his latest march, "Hands Across the Sea", to the band. The band played "Dixie" 72 consecutive times in 1902 at the Charleston Exposition, setting the world record. At this exposition, the band also played for Teddy Roosevelt, who was quoted to have said he "had never seen such a band." John Philip Sousa met each member of the band personally in 1904 at the Louisiana Purchase Exposition (100th anniversary celebration that was delayed for one year) in St. Louis, Missouri. The VPI Cadet Band played in their first of several Presidential Inaugural Parades for President Woodrow Wilson in 1917.

Wilfred Preston ("Pete") Maddux, a trombone and baritone player in the Highty-Tighties (member of the band from the fall of 1917 to 1919), jointly composed "Tech Triumph" (1985 recording) in 1919 along with Mattie Walton Eppes (Boggs). Mattie Eppes was a neighbor of Pete in his hometown of Blackstone, Virginia. When he was home, Pete would often play violin with Mattie accompanying him on the piano. One evening in the summer of 1919, Pete asked her to help him compose a fight song for VPI. She played the tune and Pete wrote out the score and the words for two verses in a single evening. Pete Maddox is not listed in the yearbook with the band after 1919. Ms. Eppes later married John C. Boggs, Superintendent of Randolph-Macon Military Academy.

=== Name origin ===
According to longstanding cadet lore, the band's nickname dates from a 1921 parade in Richmond held in honor of Ferdinand Foch, Supreme Commander of the Allies during World War I. As the story goes, the band's drum major tossed his mace in front of the reviewing stand. The mace was knocked down by the wind and bounced on the ground. The drum major caught the mace off the bounce and snapped off a proper salute to the reviewing officer. Foch supposedly yelled 'hoity-toity' (show-off in French). In the Appalachian English dialect of southwest Virginia, this came out as "Highty-Tighty!"

However, according to The Guidon, the Corps of Cadets handbook, the band's nickname actually originated from the days when the band was housed in Division E, the fifth stairwell of the cadet barracks in Lane Hall. In 1919, a company yell was devised containing the phrase "Highty-Tighty." Over the years, the phrase became associated with the band itself. It was first heard one night while the cadets offered up cheers while waiting for meals. The bandsmen were tired of not having a nickname, and made up a cheer that went: "Highty Tighty, Christ Almighty, who the hell are we? Riff ramm, goddamn, we're from Division E!"

The cheer's words have changed several times over the years. It now goes: "Highty-Tighty, we are mighty, who the hell are we? Biff bam, I'll be damned, we're the band, you see!" By a longstanding tradition, it is started by the band commander after a successful public performance.

== Band company organizations ==
The Highty-Tighties formed several musical units within the band over the years, including

- 1873, A 16-member drum and bugle corps was formed. The Bugle Corps was a separate unit, but in some years the buglers were part of the Corps units. In modern times, the buglers have been an integral part of the band.
- Band members, including Pete Maddux played in the VPI Jazz Orchestra in the early 20th century.
- 1931, A dance band, called The Southern Colonels was formed. The Southern Colonels were also called the Collegians early prior to 1933. In 1937 and 1940, the Southern Colonels traveled to Germany and France on the USS New York to perform in nightclubs. The Southern Colonels are still active today, performing at weddings and other special occasions. Other big band groups included the Virginia Techmen, which in 1933 replaced the Tech Buccaneers (1927–1933). In 1934, there was also a group called the Techadets.
- Members of the band also performed in a mandolin orchestra and glee club in the late 19th century and early 20th century.
- The Highty-Tighties traditionally performed as a concert band every Spring during the 1960s and 1970s at various colleges in the State of Virginia, including Radford University, Hollins College, Sweet Briar College, and Randolph-Macon College. This concert band tradition was a follow-on to the concerts that the Band gave in the Spring on the Tech campus in the 1930s.
- 1976, A Fife and Drum Corps was organized to perform at United States Bicentennial events, including one at which they played for Virginia's Governor Mills E. Godwin Jr.

== Parades and performances ==
In addition to home coming parades and home and away football pre-game and halftime shows, the Highty-Tighties have marched and played at all manner of events within Virginia and elsewhere. The following are some of the significant activities and events in the life of the Highty-Tighties in the 20th century.

=== 1893-1950 ===
- 1934, The Band was President Franklin Roosevelt's official band, when he dedicated the Veterans' Hospital in Salem, Virginia.
- 1937, Jim Schaeffer returned as band director, remaining until his death in 1951. He died on November 27, 1951. When he was buried, he was accorded the highest tribute the corps can bestow—the streets of Blacksburg were lined on both sides from the Lutheran Church to the cemetery by cadets standing at attention and saluting the body when it passed. The band led the funeral procession but played no music. It was a most impressive and respectful tribute to Schaeffer and his contributions. Director Jim Schaeffer is considered by many to be responsible for elevating the Band to the high level of quality in marching and musicianship that it still maintains.

=== 1951-1980 ===
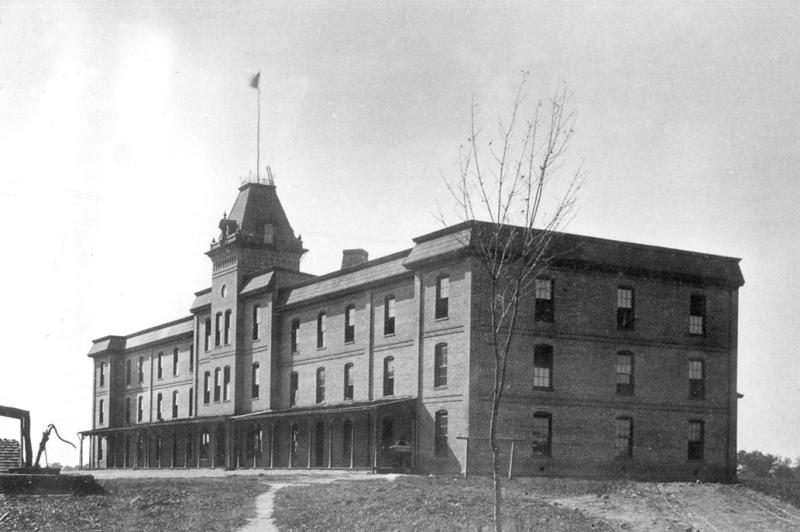
Lane Hall circa 1888–89

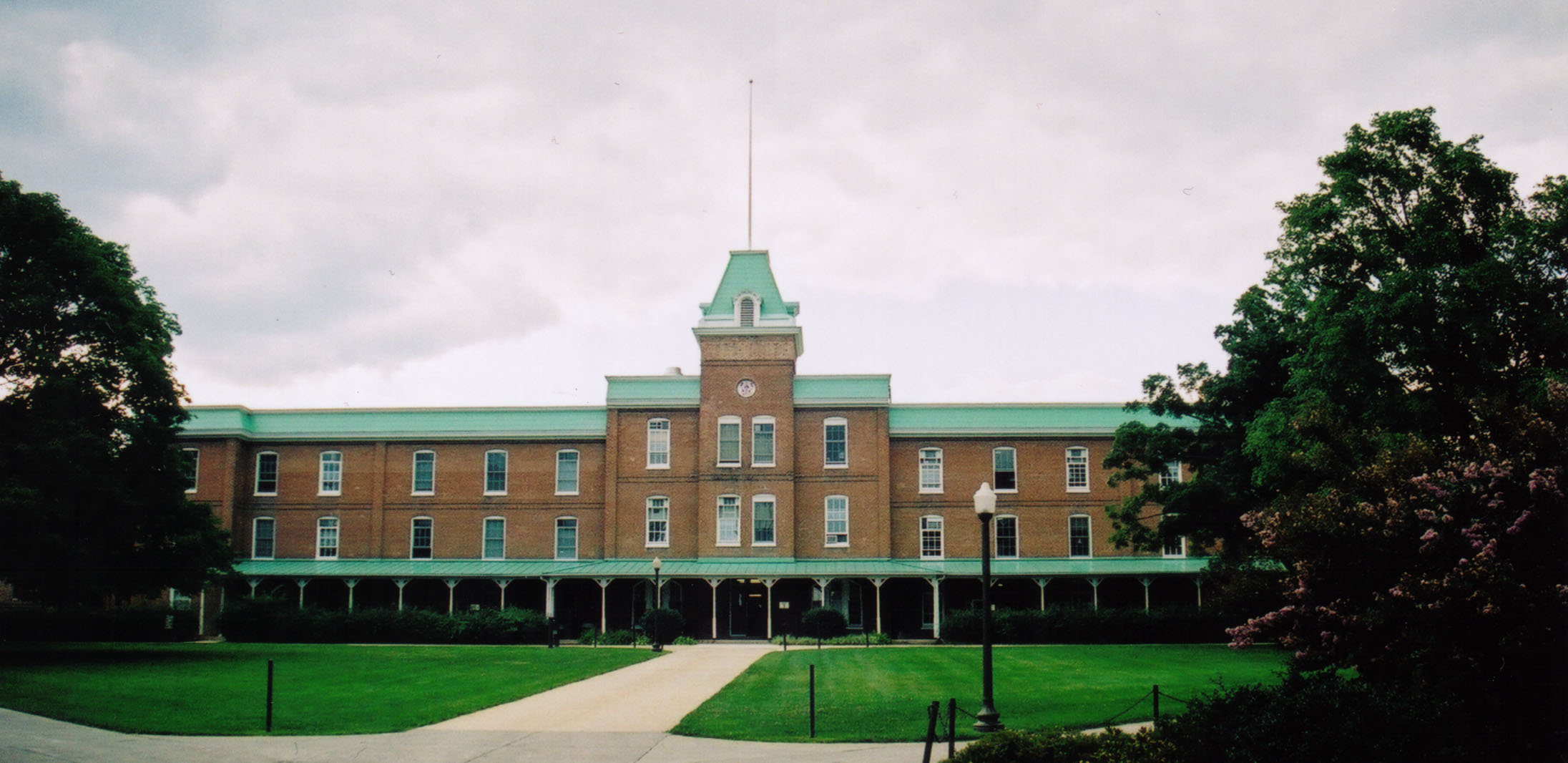
Lane Hall in 2004

- 1958, The Band placed first in the Shenandoah Apple Blossom Festival Parade and was featured on the Today Show in New York. In 1959, the band again won the Apple Blossom Parade. The Band first marched in the Apple Blossom Parade in the spring of 1935.
- 1960, The band performed at the halftime show for the Washington Redskins–Dallas Cowboys football game.
- 1963, The Band won the National Cherry Blossom Festival Parade in Washington, D.C.
- 1964, The Band marched as the opening band for the New York World's Fair in 1964.
- 1964, The Band inaugurated the first football Band Day at VPI on October 10.
- 1966, The Highty Tighties were the last Virginia Tech students to live in Lane Hall in the Fall Quarter of 1966. Lane Hall, named after General James H. Lane when it first opened in 1888, still stands but it is used now for faculty offices. The Highty-Tighties took up residence in Brodie Hall when classes resumed in 1967.
- December 1966 and 1968, The band was featured at the Liberty Bowl (Memphis, Tennessee) football game in which VPI played against the University of Miami (1966) and Mississippi (1968). The games were televised as the "game of the week."
- 1966, 1970, 1984, 1988, 1996, 1999, 2001, 2004, and 2010 The Highty-Tighties marched in the Cherry Blossom Parade in Washington, D.C.
- 1971, The band performed at the halftime show for the Baltimore Colts-Buffalo Bills football game in Baltimore, Maryland.
- In the spring of 1971, the Band won the Azalea Festival Parade in Norfolk, Virginia.
- 1971, Tom Dobyns retired as band director, after almost twenty years of continuous leadership. He was honored at a banquet commemorating his great service to the band. Mr. Joseph Lamoureux was named as director to succeed Tom Dobyns.
- 1972, The Highty-Tighties performed in the half time show at the Washington-Dallas game at RFK Stadium
- 1972 and 1974, The Highty-Tighties won the International Azalea Festival parade.
- 1974, the band marched as the honor band in the Virginia Governor's Inaugural Parade.
- 1975, the Highty-Tighty Alumni Association was formed. The purpose of the Alumni Association was to support the Highty-Tighties and to sustain their growth and development. Alumni were concerned about the decreasing size of the Band and the Corps and established scholarships for Highty-Tighties to assist in recruiting and retention. Charles O. Cornelison was the first Highty-Tighty Alumni Association President. The Alumni formed an Alumni band that began marching with the Highty-Tighties during the Homecoming Parade and during the pre-game and halftime show. Christopher Bise, HT '72, has been the Alumni Band Drum Major since 1975.
- During World War II, women from Radford University (temporarily part of VPI) were reportedly allowed to march with the Highty-Tighties. In 1975, the first females were integrated into the Band as Highty-Tighties. Stephanie Hahn was the 1st of eight women to march with the Highty-Tighties in 1975. These women lived in L company, an all female company. According to Virginia Tech history, Marilyn Helmeyer was the first woman officially in the Band Company in 1977. Lori Keck (LASC 1992) become the first female drum major of the Highty Tighties in 1992.
- 1976, The Highty-Tighties won first place at the Warsaw Bicentennial Parade, representing the Army ROTC unit in this district.
- 1975, The Highty Tighties won first place at the Apple Blossom Parade in Winchester, Virginia.
- 1977, Dr. James R. Sochinski took over as director of the Band. In 1974, Dr. Sochinski went on to form the civilian band, the Marching Virginians at Virginia Tech.
- 1977, The band performed in the halftime show of the Washington Redskins-Philadelphia Eagles football game.
- 1977, The band marched as one of eight honor bands at Macy's Thanksgiving Day Parade in New York City.
- Spring of 1977, The band was awarded the Beverly S. Parrish Gold Cord award for the first time. The Gold Cord is awarded to the outstanding Virginia Tech Corps of Cadets Unit.
- 1979, Johnny Pherigo become band director.

=== 1981-pres ===
- 1981, Wallace Easter took over as band director.
- 1981, Performed for the closing ceremonies of the Knoxville, Tennessee World's Fair.
- 1981, 1987, 1991, 1999, 2007, Marched in the Macy's Thanksgiving Day Parade.
- 1983, 1984, 1985, 1986, Performed for President Ronald Reagan, playing "Ruffles and Flourishes" and "Hail to the Chief" at the Conservative Political Action Committee.
- 1984, Marched in the Preakness Parade in Baltimore, Maryland.
- 1985, Marched in the Gimbal's Thanksgiving Parade in Philadelphia, Pennsylvania.
- 1986, Marched in Coca-Cola's Centennial Parade in Atlanta, Georgia.
- 1988, 1990, 1992, 1993, 1997, 1999, Marched in the Macy's Christmas Parade in Atlanta, Georgia. This parade is now known as the Eggleston Children's Foundation Christmas Parade.
- 1992, George McNeill, retired enlisted U.S. Army Band member, took over as band director.
- 1992, 1998, Marched as honor band in the Fort Myers, Florida Festival of Lights Parade.
- 1995, 2006, 2007, Marched in the Macy's Thanksgiving Day Parade in Philadelphia, Pennsylvania.
- 1997, 2001, 2002, 2003, 2005, 2007, 2011, 2014, and 2017, Marched in the Saint Patrick's Day parade in Savannah, Georgia.
- 2002, 2004, and 2009 Marched in the Krewe of Endymion parade at Mardi Gras in New Orleans.
- 1988, 2004, 2010, 2014, and 2018, Marched in the Virginia Governor's Inaugural Parade.
- 2005, Awarded the Beverly S. Parrish Gold Cord.
- 2007, Performed for President George W. Bush after the April 16th Virginia Tech shooting.
- 2007, Marched in the New York Macy's Thanksgiving Day parade.
- 2008, 2009, 2012, 2022, Marched at the Martinsville Speedway and played the "National Anthem" prior to a NASCAR cup race.
- 2012, Marched in the Macy's St. Patrick's Day parade in New York City
- 2012, Marched in the Veteran's Day Parade in Orlando, Florida.
- 2022, Marched in the Virginia Gubernatorial Inauguration Parade in Richmond, Virginia.
- 2022, Marched in the Endymion Parade during Mardi Gras in New Orleans, Louisiana and marched in the Parade of Bands in the Super-dome.
- 2023, Marched in the NYC St. Patrick’s Day Parade
- 2024, Marched in the Savannah St. Patrick's Day Parade
- 2025, Marched in the Pittsburgh St. Patrick's Day Parade

== Presidential inaugural parades ==
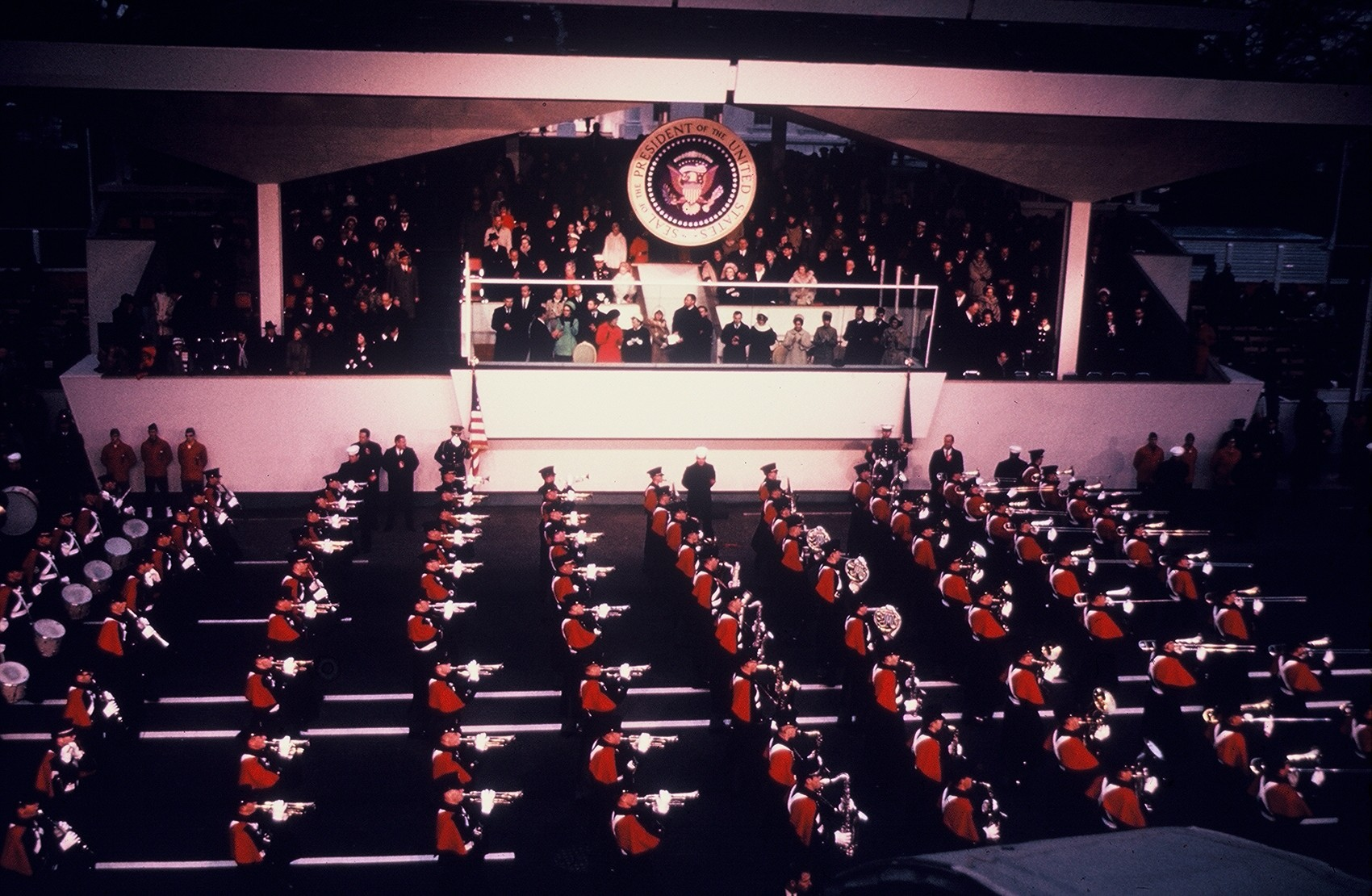
Highty-Tighties march in the 1969 Nixon Inaugural Parade

- March 4, 1917, The VPI Cadet band played in their first Presidential Inaugural Parades for President Woodrow Wilson.
- Jan 20, 1953, The Highty-Tighties won the grand prize in President Dwight D. Eisenhower's first Inaugural Parade.
- Jan 20, 1957, The Highty-Tighties won their second consecutive Presidential Inaugural parade, again marching for President Eisenhower.
- Jan 20, 1961, The Highty-Tighties won their third consecutive Presidential Inaugural, marching for President John F. Kennedy. In doing so, they become the only band to win the parade three times consecutively. No other band had won more than once at a time.
- Jan 20, 1965, The Highty-Tighties marched for President Lyndon Johnson as retired champions of the Presidential Inaugural Parade. This was the first parade ruled non-competitive, a decision made only days before the parade, most likely because of the Highty-Tighties dominance of the parade in past years.
- Jan 20, 1969, The Highty-Tighties marched in President Richard M. Nixon's Inaugural Parade in January 1969 as "undefeated champions", and were presented with the white ribbon with 3 silver stars. This ribbon symbolized the 3 consecutive years the Highty-Tighties won the parade. Earlier bands were awarded the white ribbon with a single star for an Inaugural Parade first place appearance.
- Jan 20, 1973, The Highty-Tighties marched in President Richard M. Nixon's second inaugural parade.
- Jan 20, 1977, The Highty-Tighties marched in President Jimmy Carter's Inaugural Parade.
- Jan 20, 1981, The Highty Tighties marched in President Ronald Reagan's first Inaugural Parade, as a marching unit without instruments.
- Jan 20, 1985, The Inaugural Parade, President Reagan's second, was cancelled due to extreme cold (only time in inaugural history).
- Jan 20, 1997, The Highty-Tighties marched in President Bill Clinton's second inaugural.
- Jan 20, 2005, The Highty-Tighties marched in President George W. Bush's second inaugural parade (the Highty Tighties' 11th inaugural parade).
- Jan 20, 2009, The Highty-Tighties marched and played a 20-minute set in front of the Lincoln Memorial to open Barack Obama's inauguration ceremonies.

== List of band directors ==
the band marches to the stadium during a home football game

- Major James Patton Harvey, 1892–1905, 1912–1915
- Cadet Frank Clifton Carper (Class of 1899), 1897–1898, 1898–1899
- Major Hugh Douglas McTier, 1905–1910
- Cadet Marsden Smith (Class of 1911), 1910–1911
- Mr. Henry H. Hill, 1915–1916
- Mr. Peter Ubaldo Janutolo (Class of 1913), 1915–1916
- Mr. James Soloman Schaeffer, 1917–1921, 1936–1951
- Professor William Luther Skaggs, 1921–1927
- Mr. G.A. Johnson, 1927–1936
- Mr. Thomas Dobbyns, 1951–1971
- Mr. Joseph Lamoureux, 1971–1977
- Dr. James R. Sochinski, 1977–1979
- Mr. Johnny Pherigo, 1979–1981
- Mr. Wallace Easter, 1981–1992
- Lieutenant Colonel George McNeill, Virginia Militia, 1992–2015
- Senior Chief Jim Bean USN (Ret.), 2015–2025
- Dr. Matthew Clark, Major (RCAF, retired) MMM CD 2025-Present

Unlike most military bands, the drum major is not in charge of the band as a whole. Like all companies of the Corps, the band has its own commander. The Band Commander is a Cadet Captain if a senior, and an enlisted officer if an underclassman. Traditionally, the drum major has been a Cadet Captain, if they are a senior.

== See also ==
- Fightin' Texas Aggie Band
- Marching Virginians
- Marching band
- Skipper
- U.S. military bands
- Virginia Tech Corps of Cadets
