= Lloyd W. Williams =

United States Marine Corps officer

Major Lloyd W. Williams
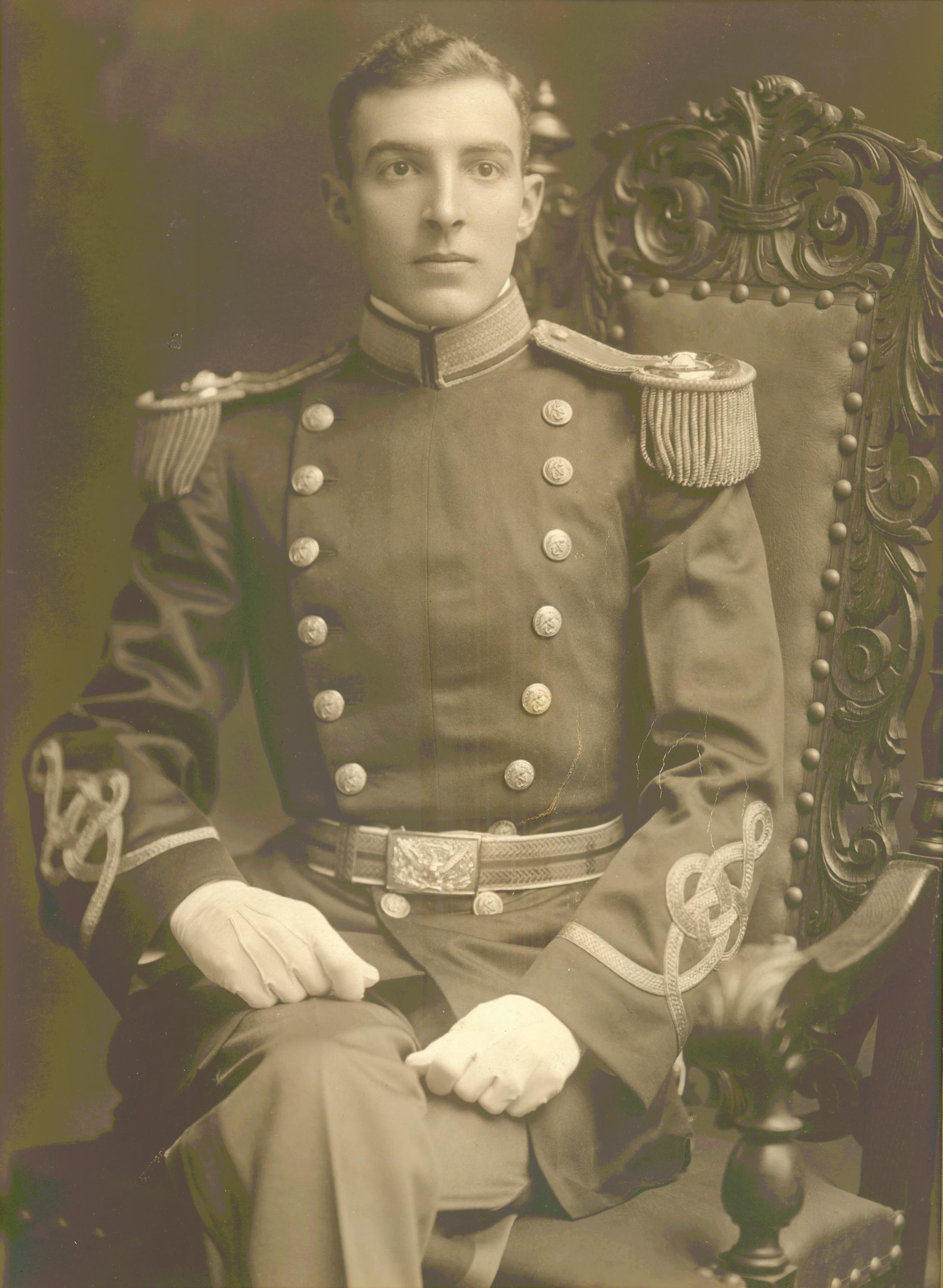
- Second Lieutenant Lloyd W. Williams, USMC, 1909
- Born: January 5, 1887; Berryville, Virginia, US
- Died: June 12, 1918 (aged 31); Chateau-Thierry, France
- Burial place: Green Hill Cemetery, Berryville, Virginia
- Military career
- Allegiance: United States of America
- Branch: United States Marine Corps
- Service years: 1909–1918
- Rank: Captain; Major (posthumous)
- Unit: 2nd Battalion, 5th Marines
- Conflicts: Banana Wars: United States occupation of Nicaragua; World War I: Battle of Belleau Wood †
- Awards: Silver Star (3); Purple Heart

Major Lloyd W. Williams (June 5, 1887 – June 12, 1918) was an officer in the United States Marine Corps who served and died in World War I.

== Early life and education ==
Lloyd W. Williams was born on June 5, 1887, in Berryville, Virginia. While very young, his family moved to Washington, DC. Williams attended Virginia Polytechnic Institute (Virginia Tech) and graduated in 1907, as the captain of Alpha Company in the Virginia Tech Corps of Cadets. After graduating, he became a second lieutenant of the United States Marine Corps on December 11, 1909. In 1912, Williams was deployed to Nicaragua and saw combat in the capture of León during the Banana Wars.

== World War I ==
During World War I, Captain Williams was assigned to command the division's 51st Company in the 2nd Battalion, 5th Marines Regiment.

On June 3, 1918, a brigade of Marines was sent to support the French army at the Battle of Belleau Wood. Lloyd Williams was serving as the commander of the 51st Company, 2nd Battalion, 5th Marines. As the Marines arrived, they found French troops retreating. When advised to withdraw by a French colonel at the defensive line just north of the village of Lucy-le-Bocage, Williams bluntly replied: "Retreat, hell! We just got here!"

On June 11, 1918, Williams led an assault that routed the German defenders at Belleau Wood near Chateau-Thierry, France. Only one of the ten officers and 16 of the 250 enlisted men survived or escaped injury. According to a French major's report, after he ordered Williams to withdraw, Williams told him to "go to hell." Later, when Williams had been gassed and injured by shrapnel and lay wounded on the battlefield, he told the approaching medics, "Don't bother with me. Take care of my good men." He later died from a shell explosion as he was being evacuated.

Captain Williams was posthumously promoted to the rank of major.

== Awards ==
Williams received three Silver Star citations and a Purple Heart. He was recommended for two other awards: (the Medal of Honor and the Distinguished Service Cross) by his commanding officer, Colonel Wise, but neither was granted.

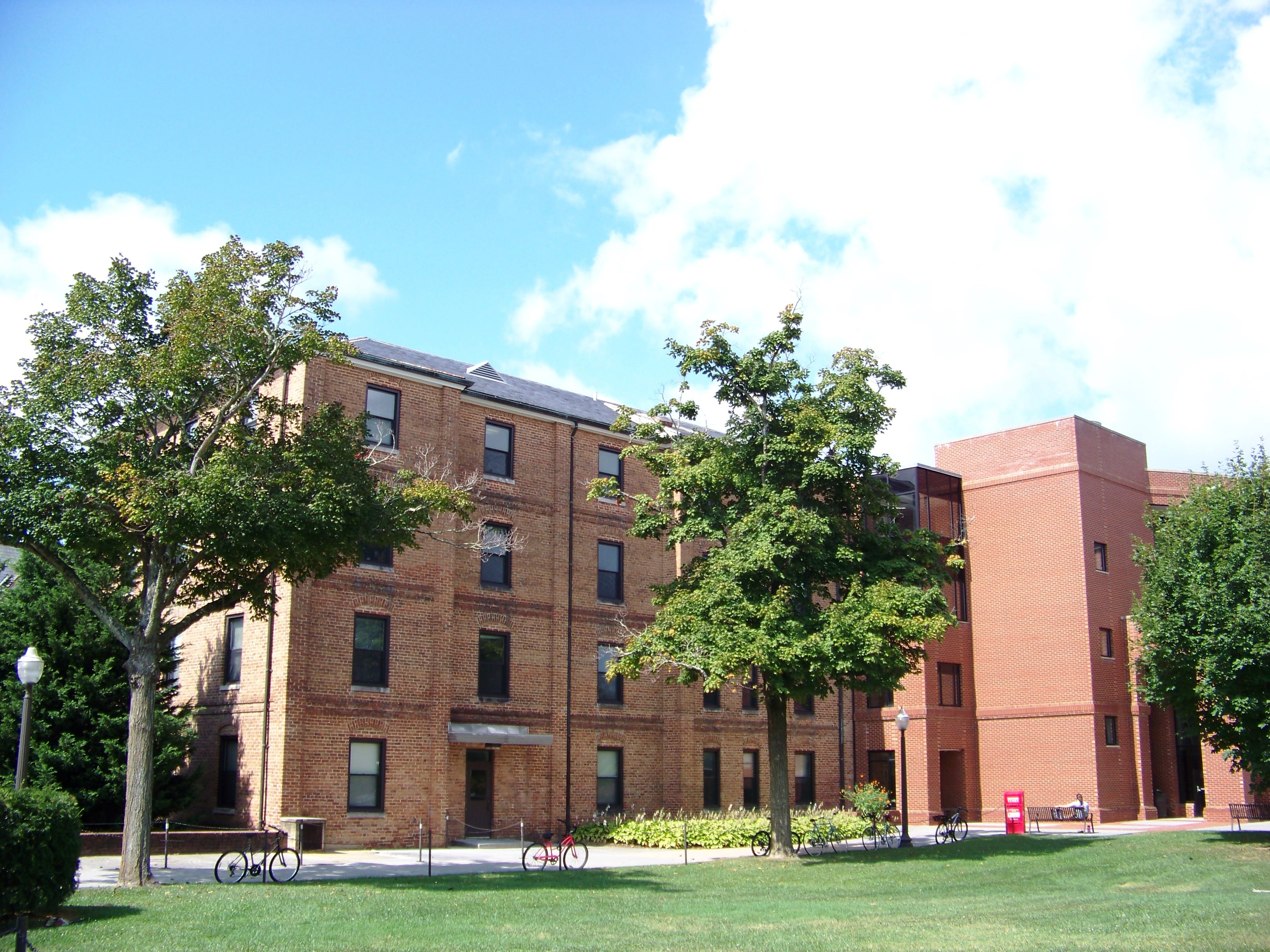
Major Williams Hall at Virginia Tech

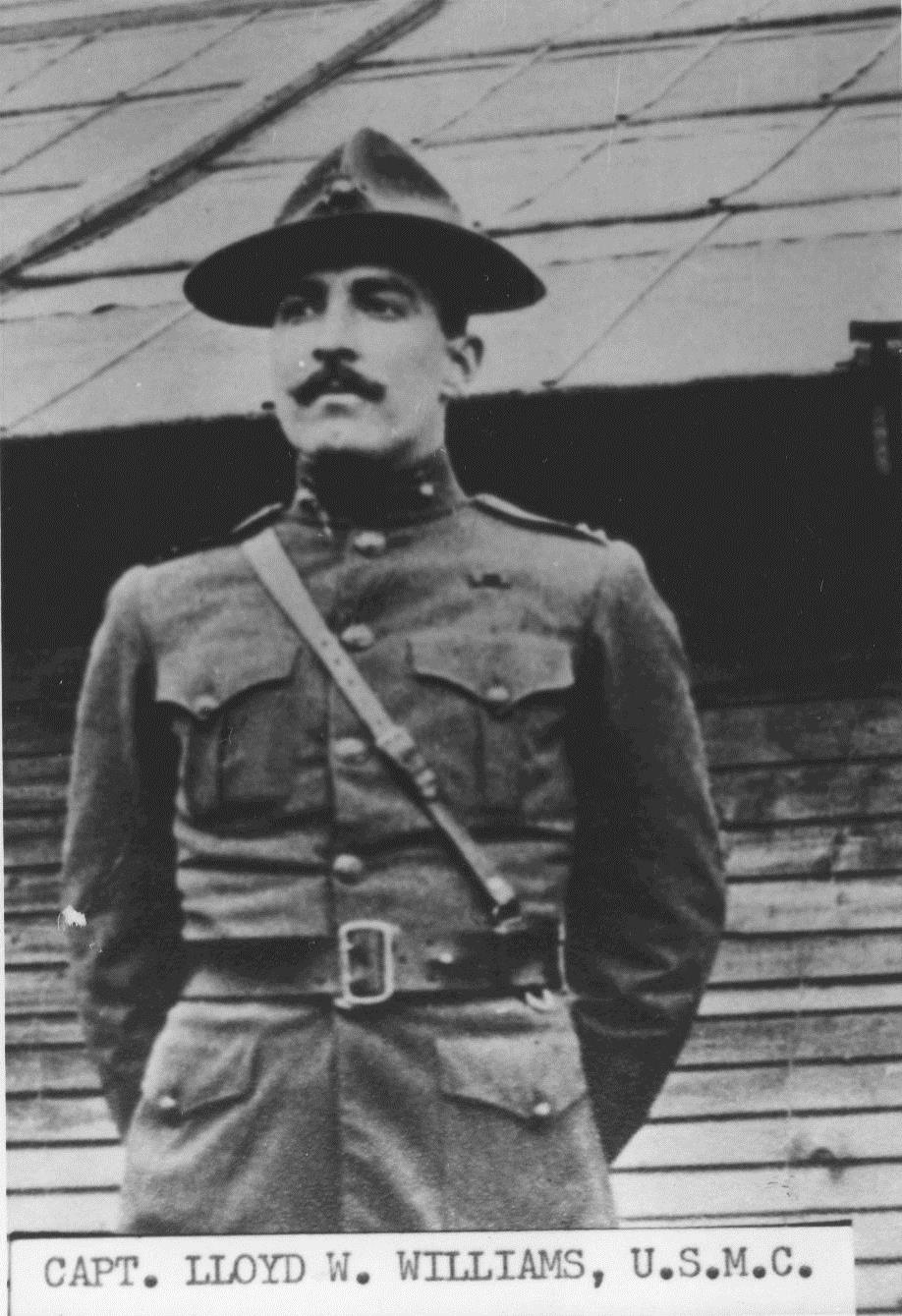
Captain Lloyd W. Williams c.1918

== Legacy ==
- Major Williams is considered to be the first known Virginian to die in World War I.
- The U. S. Marine Corps' 2nd Battalion, 5th Regiment adopted the motto "Retreat, hell!", in honor of Major Williams. Fighting since 1914, 2/5 is the most highly decorated battalion in Marine history.
- On September 12, 1919, a new American Legion post in Berryville, Virginia was named in Williams' honor.
- In 1957, a new campus building at Lloyd's Alma Mater, Virginia Tech was named Major Williams Hall (a.k.a. "Major Bill") in his honor. The new building was a combination of two older barracks and originally functioned as both a corps and civilian student dormitory. In 1995, it was renovated and converted to academic offices for the history department in the College of Arts and Sciences. A plaque in his honor can be found in the building's front entrance.
- Major Williams is referenced by the power metal band Sabaton in their song "Devil Dogs".
