= Virginia Tech Corps of Cadets =

- Country: United States
- Allegiance: Virginia
- Type: Senior military college
- Role: Officer training and Leadership Development
- Size: 1,400
- Part of: Virginia Tech
- Garrison/HQ: Blacksburg, Virginia, U.S.

Commanders
- Commandant: Major General (Ret.) William H. Seely III, USMC
- Vice Commandant: Brigadier General Craig J. Alia, VA

Insignia
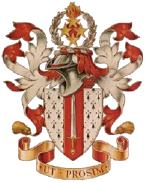
- Crest

The Virginia Tech Corps of Cadets (VTCC) is the military component of the student body at Virginia Polytechnic Institute and State University. Cadets live together in residence halls, attend morning formation, wear a distinctive uniform, and receive an intensive military and leadership educational experience similar to those at the United States service academies. The Corps of Cadets has existed from the founding of the university as the Virginia Agricultural and Mechanical College in 1872 to the present-day institution of Virginia Tech, which is designated a senior military college by federal law. As of August 2025, about 1,400 cadets are currently enrolled in the program.

== Overview ==
The Corps provides leadership training for all of its cadets through two tracks: a Military-Leader Track for cadets enrolled in one of the three Reserve Officer Training Corps (ROTC) programs, and the Citizen-Leader Track for cadets wishing to pursue civilian sector careers. Students in the Military-Leader track can pursue a commission in the Army, Navy, Marine Corps, Air Force, or Space Force.

All cadets have the opportunity to receive an academic minor in Leadership through the Rice Center for Leader Development which is in the Virginia Tech Pamplin College of Business. To earn the minor, cadets must complete 22 academic credits and have three successful leadership positions within the Corps and or ROTC.

Around 80% of the cadets choose the Military-Leader Track. If a student is enrolled in an ROTC program at Virginia Tech, they must also be enrolled in the Corps of Cadets. However, a student does not have to be enrolled in an ROTC program in order to participate in the Corps. There are a few exceptions made for active duty enlisted students participating in programs such as the Army's Green to Gold program. However, ROTC cadets may compete for four-, three-, and two-year ROTC scholarship opportunities that typically pay tuition, fees, an amount towards books, and a monthly stipend that ranges from $250 per month to $500 per month.

The remaining cadets choose the Citizen-Leader Track to pursue civilian careers or officer training or officer candidate training programs after graduation, or attend professional or graduate schools. Some cadets in this track also participate in the Coast Guard Auxiliary University Program (AUP), which provides leadership training, maritime education, and service opportunities. Since the Coast Guard does not have an ROTC program, the AUP serves as a pathway for cadets interested in commissioning as Coast Guard officers after graduation. Eighty-three percent of the Citizen-Leader Track cadets had a job or graduate school offer in hand upon graduation in May 2016. Recently, Northrop Grumman funded six scholarships for Citizen-Leader Track cadets or Military-Leader Track cadets not on scholarship which included an opportunity to intern with Northrop Grumman as well. Citizen-Leader Track cadets participate in an exercise called Job-Ex, where the junior and senior cadets learn to write a job description, freshman and sophomore cadets apply to those jobs, the upperclass cadets review them, and then they conduct panel interviews with the underclass cadets, so they can learn from their peers what is successful in a job interview. The upperclass cadets learn what interviewers expect, so they can improve their interviewing skills as well. The Rice Center Board of Advisors, made up from executives from organizations such as Northrop Grumman, Union Pacific, Dell, the Defense Intelligence Agency, and the Federal Bureau of Investigation, advise the Corps staff on curriculum and skill sets cadets need to develop to be more employable after graduation.

Women entered the VTCC in the fall of 1973 and created a single unit called L Squadron. By 1979, women were integrated into the line companies, though they still lived separately from the males in their units. In 1981, the residence halls became co-ed and women began to live in the same unit area as their male counterparts. In 1987, the first female Regimental Commanding Officer (CO) was appointed. To date, the Corps has had 12 female Regimental Commanding Officers. Today the Corps is at least 20% female and women hold leadership positions throughout the Corps.

== History ==
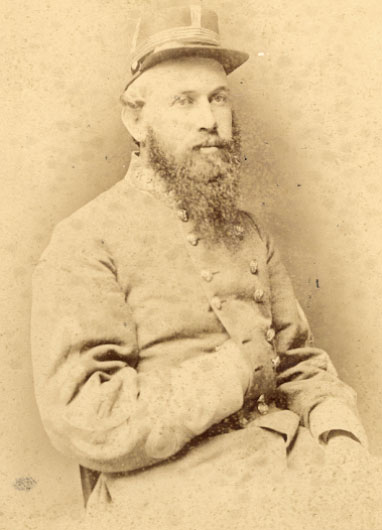
General James Henry Lane, CSA, Commandant of Cadets

=== Early years of the Corps ===
On October 1, 1872, Virginia Tech opened as the Virginia Agricultural and Mechanical College (VAMC). All students were cadets organized into a battalion of two companies with an enrollment of 132. The Commandant of Cadets was General James H. Lane, formerly the youngest general in the Army of Northern Virginia, who was wounded three times in combat. Based on his experience in the Civil War, as a student and teacher at VMI and UVA, and as a teacher at Florida State Seminary and North Carolina Military Institute, he wrote the first cadet regulations.

In 1878, VAMC President Charles Minor wanted to do away with the strict military requirements. Lane opposed him and their disagreement became so heated that a faculty meeting ended with a fistfight between the two. Both left campus in the ensuing scandal, but the Corps remained.

The VAMC cadets made their first Corps trip in 1875 to Richmond to the dedication of the Lee Monument. Over the years, the Corps has made many trips. These trips were more frequent in the early years including the Pan-American Exposition in Buffalo, New York in 1901 and the St. Louis World's Fair in 1904. In 1880, political mismanagement from Richmond contributed to enrollment dropping to just 78 cadets. But in the ensuing years, enrollment and educational opportunities were expanded. E Battery, manning four Civil War artillery pieces with upper classmen, existed between 1883 and 1907.

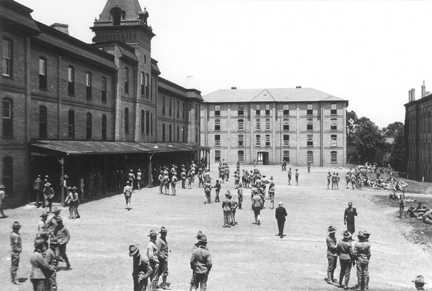
Outside Barracks No. 1 (now called Lane Hall) circa 1905-06

In 1896, VAMC, through an act of the Virginia Legislature, changed its name to the Virginia Agricultural and Mechanical College and Polytechnic Institute. The name was quickly abbreviated in common usage to VPI. Also that same year, a tradition began that lasted nearly three-quarters of a century, the VPI-VMI annual football game in Roanoke. Known as the Military Classic of the South, the annual Corps trips and associated parades ended in 1970.

The first cadet barracks was opened in 1888. Known as Barracks No. 1, it would become the heart of the Corps and what would become the Upper Quad. It housed 130 students and had revolutionized campus amenities by having bathrooms containing hot and cold running water. In 1894 and 1900 respectively, Barracks No. 2 and Barracks No. 3 were constructed to add more dormitory space as the Corps outgrew the first barracks. Barracks No. 2 was later renamed to Rasche Hall while Barracks No. 3 became Brodie Hall. In honor of General Lane, Barracks No. 1 was renamed to Lane Hall in the 1950s.

=== Spanish–American War service ===
In 1898, with the outbreak of the Spanish–American War, the VPI Corps of Cadets formally volunteered to the governor for combat service. This request was declined, but most of the VPI Cadet band and their director enlisted as the Band of the 2nd Virginia Infantry Regiment. Many alumni served in the Spanish–American War and the Philippine–American War. One alumnus (Antoine A. M. Gaujot, Class of 1901) was awarded the Medal of Honor during the Philippine–American War and another cited for gallantry at the Battle of Santiago de Cuba. The Gaujot brothers Antoine and Julien remain the only two brothers in American history to receive the Medal of Honor for actions in two separate wars.

The VPI Cadet Band was first organized in 1892. Prior to that, as early as 1883, music was provided by the "Glade Cornet Band," an organization made up of people from the town of Blacksburg. The summer of 1902 saw the VPI Cadet Band serve as part of the 70th Virginia Infantry during large-scale national military maneuvers held in Manassas, Virginia. The VPI Cadet Band has been referred to as the Highty-Tighties since 1921.

=== World War I ===
Before U.S. entry into World War I, the ROTC (Reserve Officer Training Corps) was established at Virginia Tech. The Infantry unit was established 21 December 1916. During the war, Virginia Tech essentially became an army post. Cadets were inducted and became enlisted men of the Student Army Training Corps and its Navy detachment. They wore Army and Navy uniforms during this period. Two Army training detachments of between 226 and 308 men each operated on campus.

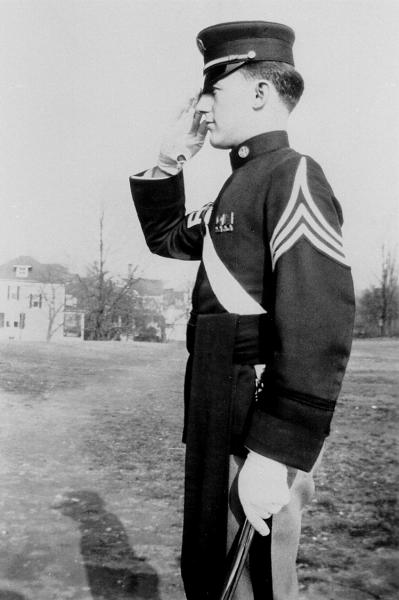
Early VPI cadet, 1927

Captain J. W. G. Stephens (class of 1915), of the 26th Infantry, led the first American forces "over on top" in combat near Montdidier, France. Many alumni served with distinction with the 1st, 2nd, 29th, and 80th Infantry Divisions, all of which saw heavy combat. Note must be made of Major Lloyd W. Williams (class of 1907), US Marine Corps. One of the famous quotes of the war, used for years as a Marine standard, was attributed to him. "Retreat, Hell No!" was his reply to the French orders to retreat his company. His company held its ground, but he was killed in the action and awarded the Distinguished Service Cross. In the air, alumni, even as World War I foreshadowed VPI's contribution to the Air Force, CPL Robert G. Eoff (class of 1918), French Foreign Legion, attached to the 157 French Fighter Squadron shot down the first of 6 enemy aircraft credited to Techmen. LT John R. Castleman (class of 1919) was awarded the Distinguished Service Cross (United States) for heroism in completing an aerial reconnaissance in spite of the attack of 12 enemy aircraft, two of which he shot down.

VPI's contribution to the war effort during World War I included 2,297 men in uniform. These included 2,155 in the Army, 125 in the Navy, 19 in the Marine Corps, 6 in the Coast Guard, 1 in the British Army and 1 in the French Foreign Legion. One alumnus (Earle D. Gregory, Class of 1921) was awarded the Medal of Honor, seven the Distinguished Service Cross (United States), and one the Navy Cross. At least eight were awarded the Silver Star. 26 died in service and another 26 were wounded. Based on this, VPI was designated as one of twelve 'Distinguished Colleges' by the War Department.

Coast Artillery and Engineer ROTC units were established on the campus 29 December 1919. After World War I, veterans affected the Corps and VPI at large, both as new and returning cadets. In 1921, women were admitted to VPI as civilian students and attended classes as day students. The next year the Corps was reorganized into a regiment of two battalions. Two years later (1923) military service as a cadet was reduced from four years to two; however, after two years of the camaraderie of Corps life very few cadets chose to convert to civilian student status. During the national rail strike of 1923, the corps again volunteered to the Virginia Governor for active military service. They were not called upon. A Third Battalion was added to the regiment by 1927. Rapid growth followed as Virginia Tech's reputation as both an outstanding academic and military institution grew. In 1939, a Fourth Battalion was added.

Following the war, the class of 1919 erected a memorial to "Our Dead Heroes Over There," honoring the eleven cadets who died during World War I. Known as "The Rock", it is a stone memorial with a bronze plaque and was placed between Brodie and Rasche Hall next to the flagpole on the Upper Quad. Since that time, it has grown to symbolize all graduates who have died in the line of duty. In honor of those cadets, all cadets in uniform salute the rock while cadets in civilian attire put their hand over their heart and look at it for six paces (as if performing an eyes-right movement).

=== World War II ===
During World War II, academic sessions and the Corps operated on a twelve-month cycle. The Corps had grown to a brigade of 2,650 cadets consisting of two regiments with a total of five battalions. The First Battalion was primarily Infantry ROTC. The Second Battalion was Engineer ROTC and the Third, Fourth and Fifth consisted of Cadet Batteries taking Coast Artillery ROTC. Because of the war, seniors were graduated and commissioned early. Juniors were on an accelerated schedule and brought on active duty. Finally, sophomores and freshmen over 18 were largely inducted into military service. The Corps soon numbered under 300 and was organized into a single battalion.

During the war, the Commandant of Cadets, in addition to the cadet battalion, supervised a unit of the Army Specialized Training Program and Army Specialized Training Reserve Program (ASTRP) (soldiers under 18 years of age) and a Navy pre-flight-training unit. These units included many former cadets, and adopted many of the traditions of the Corps, including the Honor Code and saluting the Rock. The young men of the ASRTP were actually uniformed in cadet gray. Once again VPI was largely an active duty military installation.

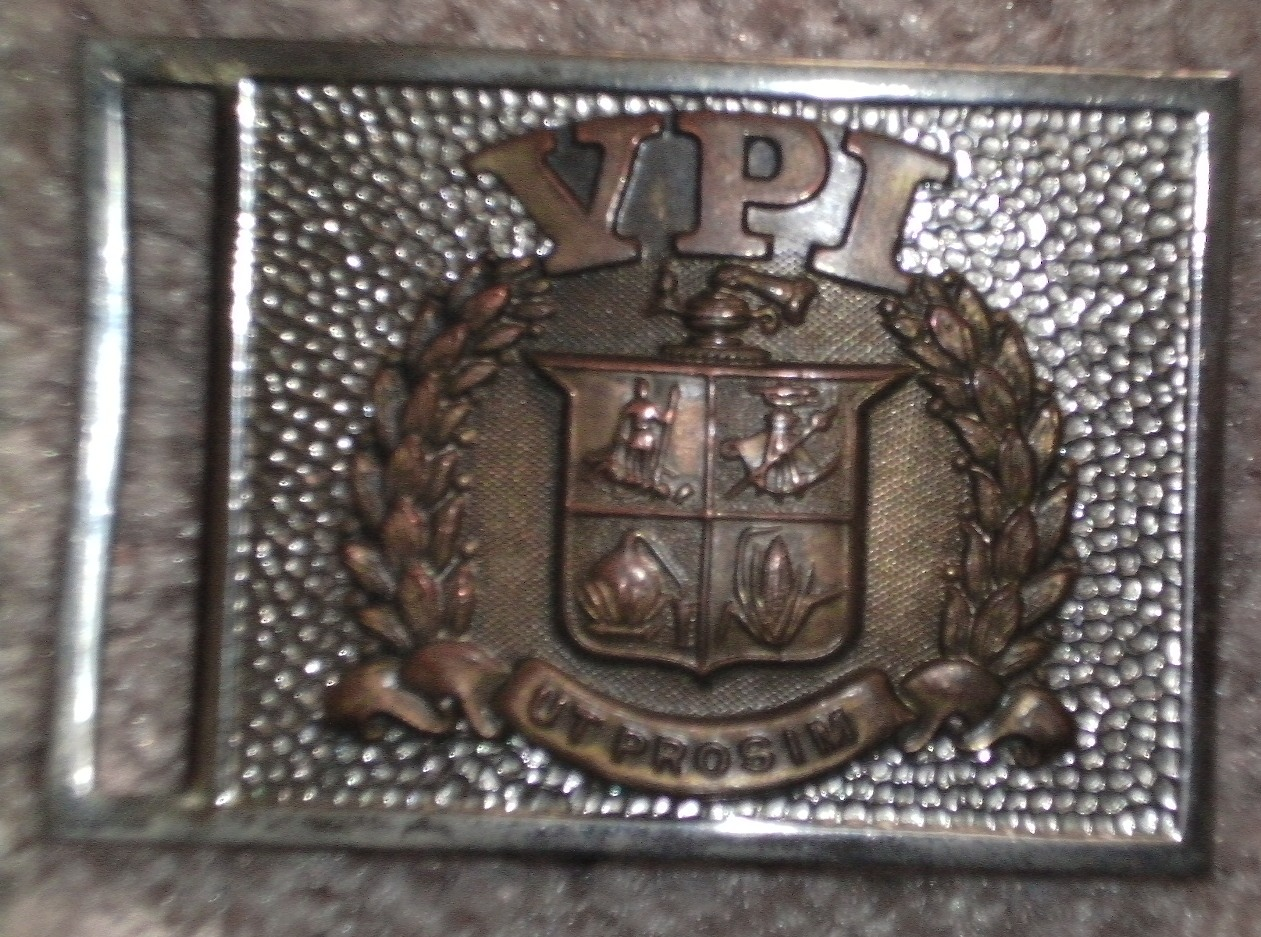
Virginia Tech Corps of Cadets belt buckle, circa 1941

Edward H. "Buddy" Dance, of Roanoke, was the President of the Corps of Cadets in the graduating class of 1942. He was, along with other seniors, graduated early. Dance was commissioned as a second lieutenant in the Army Air Corps, but quickly rose to the rank of Major in the Air Force. He flew many missions and then taught others how to fly and fight in the air.

During World War II, 7,285 alumni served in uniform. The army had 5,941 men, the navy 1,095, 110 in the Marine Corps, 29 in the Merchant Marine, 23 in the Coast Guard, and one in the Royal Air Force. These included ten Brigadier Generals, five Major Generals, and one Rear Admiral. Three hundred twenty-three died, five were recipients of the Medal of Honor, seven the Distinguished Service Cross, two the Navy Cross, at least 73 the Silver Star, and 94 the Distinguished Flying Cross.

Following World War II, returning veterans were not required to serve in the Corps and the great influx of veterans swelled the number of civilian students. Civilian students out-numbered cadets for the first time in 1946. That same year Air Force ROTC was introduced to Virginia Tech. Initially civilian-cadet relations were not good as most veterans were attending Virginia Tech for the first time. Thanks to the regimental commander Cadet Robertson (class of 1949), a World War II Coast Guard veteran, greater understanding was promoted among his fellow veterans and the Corps continued to grow and flourish.

During the following years the Corps would expand again back to a regiment and eventually organize into four battalion-size units. The Cadet 1st Battalion was housed at Radford Army Arsenal for two years at "Rad-Tech." There, in World War II Army barracks, the cadets lived and took many of their classes. For unavailable classes, a fleet of buses brought them back to the main campus. As new dorms were completed the battalion returned to campus.

=== Korean War ===
During the Korean War, 1,867 corps alumni served, of whom 30 died in service. During the war, First Lieutenant Richard Thomas Shea Jr. (Class of 1949) received the Medal of Honor posthumously for his actions at Pork Chop Hill as a company commander. In 1952, the university employed a retired general (Major General John M. Devine) as the Commandant of Cadets. This was a departure from policy that had existed since 1884, in which the senior active duty military instructor functioned as commandant.

=== 1950s, 1960s, and 1970s ===
In 1958, Virginia Tech became the first traditionally white southern college to graduate an African American, with the graduation of Cadet Charles Yates (class of 1958).

In a move to expand educational opportunities at Virginia Tech, the board of visitors made participation in the Corps completely voluntary starting in 1964. However, participation in ROTC continued to also require Corps membership. The Vietnam War period saw unrest on campus outside the Corps ranks. In 1970 demonstrations were conducted with the aim of halting Corps drill. Cowgill and Williams Hall were occupied and over 100 students were arrested. Other incidents occurred including the suspected arson of an on-campus building. Civilian-cadet relations were at an all-time low. Throughout all of this, the Corps maintained discipline and high esprit.

The post-Vietnam years saw the Corps numbers decline and reorganization to a two-battalion sized regiment. In 1973, Virginia Tech was among the first Corps of Cadets in the nation to enroll women, assigning them to L Squadron. In 1975, the first female cadet was assigned to Band Company. In 1979, L Squadron was disbanded and female cadets were integrated into the line companies. In 1991, the Cadet dormitories became co-ed.

=== 1980s and beyond ===
The freshman "Rat System" converted to the "New Cadet System" in the fall of 1981. Naval ROTC was established in 1983. The cadet regiment expanded to a three-battalion structure in 1998, which grew to four in 2022.

Early in his tenure as Commandant, Major General Randal D. Fullhart led a sweeping initiative to upgrade and consolidate Corps infrastructure on the Upper Quad precinct of campus. During his tenure, three new barracks were constructed: Pearson Hall East (2015), Pearson Hall West (2017), and Upper Quad Hall North (2023), collectively capable of housing over 1400 cadets within the Upper Quad. The Corps Leadership and Military Science Building was completed in 2023 to provide office space and classrooms for Corps and ROTC staff. In connection with these upgrades, Rasche, Brodie, Monteith, Femoyer, and Thomas Halls were demolished to create space for the new buildings.

Today the Virginia Tech Corps of Cadets is one of six senior military colleges outside the five United States service academies. Virginia Tech is one of only three universities in the nation that maintains a full-time military environment within a larger civilian university; the others are Texas A&M and the University of North Georgia.

Since the Spanish–American War, the Corps has provided officers to the U.S. military. Corps alumni who have been decorated for valor include seven Medal of Honor recipients and eighteen recipients of the nation's second highest award for valor, the Distinguished Service Cross or Navy Cross.

== Structure and operations ==
The Virginia Tech Corps of Cadets is a cadet-run organization, consisting of over 1,200 members (as of fall 2021), and is modeled on an Army infantry regiment structure. The Corps is supervised by a senior leadership staff who establish cadet regulations and enforce baseline guidance for the running of the Corps. The day-to-day corps activities, however, are run primarily by the cadets themselves.

=== Current structure ===
All companies are co-ed and integrated with members of all tracks offered within the Corps. When a cadet first joins the Corps, they are assigned to a smaller training company attached to its larger parent company. Following their freshman year, cadets are shuffled into a different company in which they will remain until they graduate from the Corps of Cadets. In most cases, a cadet's permanent company is in a different battalion than that of their freshman training company.

In some companies, the freshmen section are often given their own nicknames such as TC 1-1 for Alpha Company freshmen, DEUCE DEUCE for Foxtrot freshman, Six-pack for Kilo freshmen, and colloquially mini golf and little Mike for freshmen in those companies. It is customary for graduates of the Corps to refer to themselves by the letter of their permanent company as well as their graduating year (e.g. N-25, A-86, etc.).

Companies also have nicknames, such as the Foxtrot Panthers, however since the VTCC is currently a single regiment, no companies have the same letter destination and thus the nicknames are seldom used compared to company nicknames at West Point or Texas A&M. Some companies have two mascots, where each platoon is named after one of the mascots.

First Battalion
Alpha Company	Bravo Company	Charlie Company	Delta Company
“SKA (Still Kicking Ass)”	“BAD Co”	"Charlie Corps"	SOD (Spirit of Delta)

Second Battalion
Echo Company	Foxtrot Company	Golf Company	Hotel Company
"E-Frat"	"F-Troop"	"Golf Club"	"H-Pack"

Third Battalion
India Company	Kilo Battery	Lima Company	Mike Company
“The Jungle”	“King Company”	"LEGION"	"Big Mike"

Fourth Battalion
November Company	Oscar Company	Band Company
“SKOL!”	“O-Block”	"Highty-Tighties"

Due to changing company ROTC affiliations between US Army Infantry/Engineers, Coast Artillery, and Air Corps (later US Air Force) ROTCs, units were designated as Companies, Batteries, and Squadrons respectively.

Between the Spring and Fall semesters of 1971, due to dwindling numbers, the number of units was cut in half, to avoid favoring units at the front of the line, all Companies, Batteries, and Squadrons were divided into pairs, with each pair constituting a new company. This updated lineage carries on to this day, even as units were “reactivated” beginning with India in the reconstituted 3rd Battalion, which was fully restored with the activation of Mike company in 2021. The Fourth battalion was reactivated in 2022, along with N and O Companies.

When the companies I through O were reactivated, the reorganization of 1971 was not undone, essentially meaning that two units in the regiments (One company and one platoon) can claim the legacy of the letters I, K, L, M, N, and O (and R & S if those companies were ever reactivated). For example, N and O Squadrons were combined into the 'new' Golf Squadron meaning that Golf 1st Platoon, and November Company can both claim the legacy of the original N-Squadron.

=== Senior leadership ===
The senior leadership is headed by the Commandant of Cadets, who is appointed by Virginia Tech administration and is a salaried faculty member. Since 1952, the Commandant has been a retired general officer (most often a major general) from either the Army or Air Force. As of Spring 2025, MajGen Seely (USMC, Ret.) became the first from the Marine Corps to assume the role of Commandant. The Commandant of Cadets is assisted by a Vice Commandant of Cadets in internal Corps staff matters and coordination with a number of university constituencies. On March 18, 2025, the Vice Commandant for the Corps of Cadets position has been announced with COL (Ret.) Craig J. Alia assuming the role.

Other Corps leadership staff are the four Deputy Commandants who, along with four Senior Enlisted Advisors, oversee the cadet battalions along with one Deputy Commandant and an Assistant Deputy Commandant for the Citizen-Leader Track. There is also a Director of Alumni Development with an administrative assistant, and an Assistant Deputy Commandant for Recruiting, Assistant Recruiter, and Recruiting Assistant. A Director of Communications coordinates communication efforts amongst the Corps' many audiences, and two Residential Life Coordinators are also assigned to the Corps in order to liaison between the Office of Housing and Residence Life and the Corps. The Director of the Rice Center for Leadership Studies oversees the leadership minor and curriculum for the cadets. The Director of the Regimental Band, the Highty Tighties, is also a member of the Commandant's Staff. Also assigned are a Museum Curator, an athletic trainer (provided by Carilion), and two office and one scholarship manager. The Commandant of Cadets also oversees operation of the university's Tailor Shop.

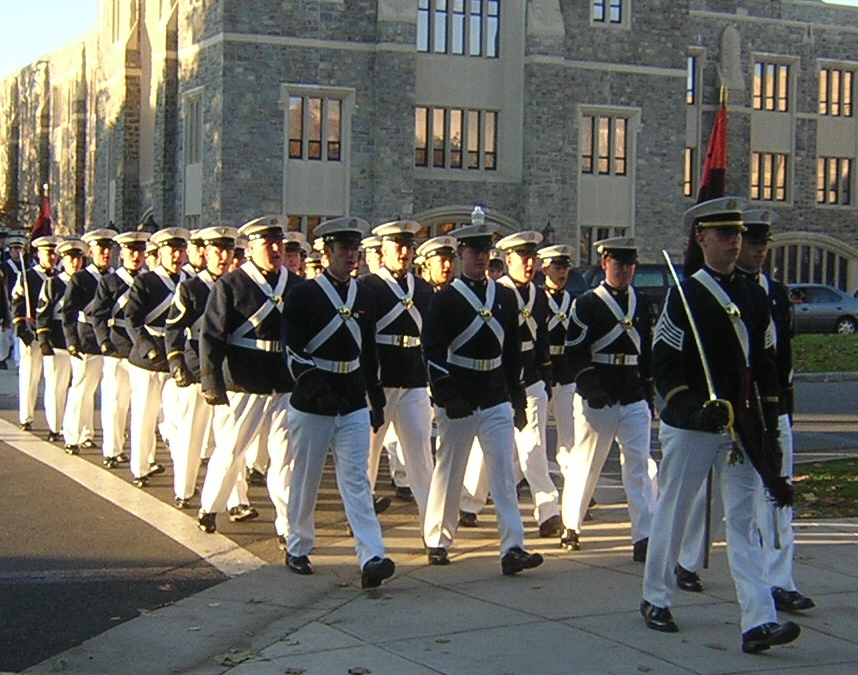
Virginia Tech Corps marching

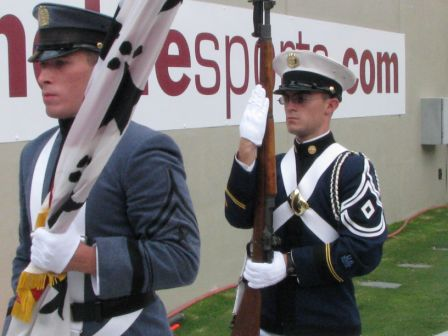
A Joint VMI-VTCC Color Guard

==== Commandants of Cadets ====
Portrait	Rank	Name	Year(s)
	General	James H. Lane	1872–1880
	Cadet Captain	James A. Clark (acting)	1880–1882
	Colonel	W. Ballard Preston	1882–1884
	Lieutenant	John C. Gresham	1884–1887
	Colonel	W. Ballard Preston	1887
	Lieutenant	John T. Knight	1887–1890
	Lieutenant	John A. Harman	1890–1894
	Lieutenant	David C. Shanks	1894–1898
	Colonel	Adam T. Finch	1898–1900
	Colonel	John S. A. Johnson	1900–1906
	Captain	George H. Jamerson	1906–1909
	Captain	William R. Dashiell	1909–1911
	Lieutenant	Joseph F. Ware	1911–1914
	Lieutenant	Sheldon W. Anding	1914–1917
	Captain	Clifford C. Carson	1917
	Major	William P. Stone	1917–1918
	Major	John C. Skuse	1918–1919
	Major	Clifford C. Carson	1919–1920
	Major	Forrest E. Williford	1920–1924
	Major	William R. Nichols	1924–1929
	Lieutenant Colonel	J. B. Maynard	1929–1935
	Lieutenant Colonel	Clesen H. Tenney	1935–1938
	Colonel	John H. Cochran	1938–1942
	Colonel	R. W. Wilson	1942–1945
	Colonel	George M. Henderson	1945–1946
	Colonel	Thomas W. Munford	1946–1951
	Colonel	Wilmer B. Merritt	1951–1952
	Major General	John M. Devine	1952–1961
	Brigadier General	Marion W. Schewe	1961–1967
	Major General	Francis T. Pachler	1967–1972
	Brigadier General	David S. Henderson	1972–1973
	Brigadier General	Earl C. Acuff	1973–1980
	Lieutenant General	Howard M. Lane	1980–1989
	Major General	Stanton R. Musser	1989–1999
	Major General	Jerrold P. Allen	1999–2011
	Major General	Randal D. Fullhart	2011–2024
	Brigadier General	Dwayne R. Edwards (interim)	2024–2025
	Major General	William H. Seely III	2025-Present

==== Vice Commandants of Cadets ====
Portrait	Rank	Name	Year(s)
	Brigadier General	Craig J. Alia	2025-Present

=== Cadet leadership ===
The Virginia Tech Corps of Cadets is organized in a way that is comparable to that of an army regiment. Each organizational level within the Corps has numerous additional staff billets. These can range from that of the regiment's inspector general to fire team leaders who report to their respective platoons and companies.

Regimental Staff

- Regimental Commander (C/COL)
  - Regimental Executive Officer (C/LTC)
    - S-1 [Adjutant] (C/MAJ)
    - S-2 [Public Affairs] (C/MAJ)
    - S-3 [Operations] (C/LTC)
      - S-33 [Current Operations] (C/CPT)
      - S-35 [Future Operations] (C/CPT)
    - S-4 [Logistics] (C/MAJ)
    - S-5 [Academics] (C/MAJ)
    - S-6 [Communications] (C/MAJ)
    - S-7 [Training] (C/MAJ)
  - Command Sergeant Major (C/CSM)

Regimental Special Staff

- Regimental Safety (C/MAJ)
- Regimental Athletics (C/CPT)
- Regimental Recruiting (C/CPT)
- Regimental Religious Liaison (C/CPT)
- Regimental Alumni Liaison (C/CPT)
- Regimental Inspector General (C/MAJ)
- Regimental Physical Training Instructor (C/CPT)
- Knowledge Management Officer (C/CPT)
- Liaison to Cadet Organizations (C/CPT)
- Army Battalion Commander (C/LTC)
- Navy Battalion Commander (C/LTC)
- Air Force Detachment Commander (C/LTC)
- VPI Battalion Commander (C/LTC)
- Honor Court Chief Justice (C/LTC)
- Staff Judge Advocate (C/MAJ)
- Growley Captain (C/CPT)
- Regimental Handler (C/SFC)
- Gregory Guard Commander (C/CPT)
- Color Guard Commander (C/CCS)
- Skipper Crew Gun Captain (C/CPT)
- Skipper Crew Chief of Smoke (C/ASG)
- Regimental Armorer (C/CPT)
- Regimental Bugler (C/CSS)
- Regimental Historian (Rank varies)
- Regimental Medic (Rank varies)
- VTCC Director Hall Council (Rank varies)
- Regimental Photographer (Rank varies)

Battalion Staff

- Battalion Commander (C/LTC)
  - Battalion Executive Officer (C/MAJ)
    - S-1 [Adjutant] (C/CPT)
    - S-2 [Public Affairs] (C/CPT)
    - S-3 [Operations] (C/MAJ)
      - S-33 [Current Operations] (C/1LT)
      - S-35 [Future Operations] (C/1LT)
        - S-3 NCOIC (C/SFC)
    - S-4 [Logistics] (C/CPT)
      - S-4 NCOIC (C/SFC)
    - S-5 [Academics] (C/CPT)
      - S-5 NCOIC (C/SFC)
    - S-6 [Information] (C/CPT)
    - S-7 [Training] (C/CPT)
      - S-7 NCOIC (C/SFC)
  - Inspector General (C/CPT)
  - Battalion Sergeant Major (C/SGM)
  - Physical Training Instructor (C/1LT)
  - Safety (C/1LT)
  - Recruiting (C/1LT)
  - Honor Representative (C/CPT)

(Note: When a JR is assigned to a position normally billeted by a senior cadet, the JR will wear either the proscribed officer rank, the rank of C/SFC, C/SSG, or a special rank (C/CSG, etc.) at the discretion of the unit commander, Deputy Commandant, and the individual cadet.)

Company Staff

- Company Commander (C/CPT)
  - Company Executive Officer (C/1LT)
    - Platoon Leaders (C/2LT)
  - Academics OIC (Rank varies)
    - Academics NCOIC (Rank varies)
  - Morale OIC (Rank varies)
  - Integration OIC (Rank varies)
    - Integration NCOIC (Rank varies)
    - Safety OIC (Rank varies)
      - Safety NCOIC (Rank varies)
  - Service OIC (Rank varies)
    - Service NCOIC (Rank varies)
  - Athletics OIC (Rank varies)
  - Honor Representative (Rank varies)
  - Company Chaplain (Rank varies)
  - Company Clerk (Rank varies)
  - Public Affairs OIC (Rank varies)
  - Historian OIC (Rank varies)
    - Historian NCOIC (Rank varies)
  - Fundraising OIC (Rank varies)
  - Recruiting OIC (Rank varies)
    - Recruiting NCOIC (Rank varies)
- Company First Sergeant (C/1SG)
  - Platoon Sergeants (C/SFC)
    - Squad Leaders (C/SSG)
      - Fire Team Leaders (C/CPL)

(Note: If a cadet has more than one position in the corps they will wear the rank of the higher position, and in First and Third Battalions a cadet will keep their rank even if they have a lower position or no position within the corps.)

=== Rank structure ===
"New Cadet" is the standard rank for all freshman upon entrance into the cadet corps. After the first six weeks, freshmen are promoted to the rank "Cadet." Historically, some second semester freshmen were selected for the rank of Cadet Private, but they still wore a white cloth belt in contrast to Cadet Privates of other classes, who wear a black belt as an upperclassman but were sanctioned for various reasons. Selection of freshmen for the rank of Cadet Private last took place in the spring of 2018. A rank of "Cadet Private First Class" has occasionally existed for Cadet Privates with a high grade point average. In the early 2000s, the "Cadet Private First Class" rank was also issued to second semester freshman, who then technically outranked upperclassmen Cadet Privates, this practice was discontinued throughout the 2010s. In the spring of 2022, Second Battalion chose to revive the rank, designating it to members of the freshmen members of each company's Eager Squad.

Cadets who do not hold a position associated with specific ranks are put at a default rank depending on their class year. Sophomores receive Cadet Corporal, juniors receive Cadet Sergeant, and seniors receive Cadet Second Lieutenant unless otherwise directed by sanctions or special circumstances. All seniors, regardless of billet, are designated as officers within the corps and likewise hold privileges associated with the status. This primarily includes parts of their uniforms such as having distinctive gold chinstraps, sabres, and single cross-belts. Fifth year seniors are referred to as "Skipper Cadets" or "Skippers" and wear a silver chin strap. A cadet of any class year who commits a serious infraction may be reduced in rank, often to Cadet Private.

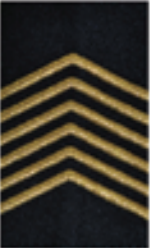
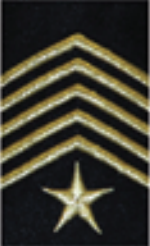
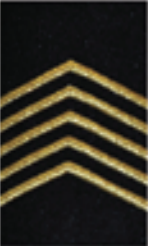
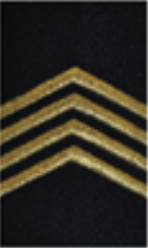
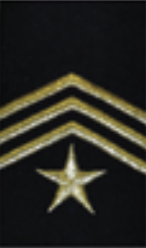
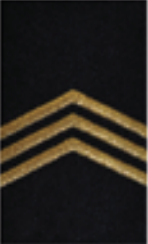
Cadet Officer (Senior) Ranks
Pay Grade	O-6	O-5	O-4	O-3	O-2	O-1
Insignia
Rank	Cadet Colonel^{1}	Cadet Lieutenant Colonel	Cadet Major	Cadet Captain^{2}	Cadet First Lieutenant	Cadet Second Lieutenant
Abbreviation	C/COL	C/LTC	C/MAJ	C/CPT	C/1LT	C/2LT
^{1}Virginia statute allows for the additional rank of cadet brigadier general, in tandem between the VTCC and VMI as part of the "Virginia Corps of Cadets", a component of the Virginia Militia; however, this rank has never been bestowed. The rank of cadet brigadier general also exists within the Arnold Air Society^{2}The Regimental Drum Major's insignia is that of a C/CPT with the addition of crossed maces beneath it. However, if Band Company is small enough to not be divided into A and B Sections, then the actual rank of the Drum Major will be that of Cadet First Lieutenant

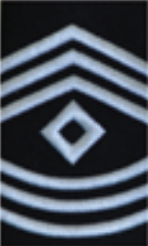
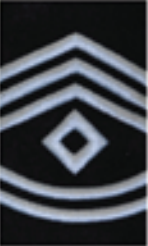
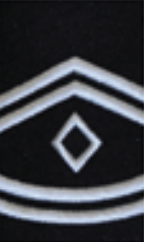
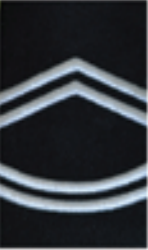
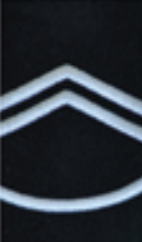
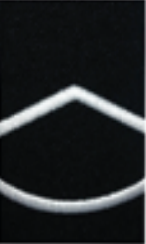
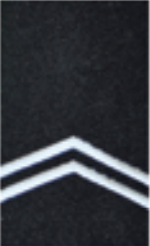
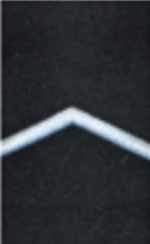
Cadet Underclassmen Ranks
Insignia									NONE
Rank	Cadet Command Sergeant Major	Cadet Sergeant Major	Cadet First Sergeant	Cadet Sergeant First Class	Cadet Staff Sergeant	Cadet Sergeant	Cadet Corporal	Cadet Private First Class	Cadet Private
Abbreviation	C/CSM	C/SGM	C/1SG	C/SFC	C/SSG	C/SGT	C/CPL	C/PFC	C/PVT

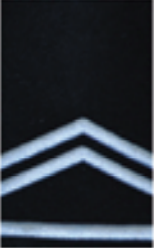
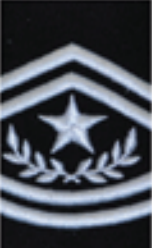
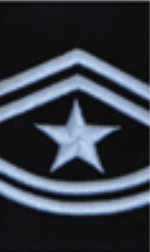
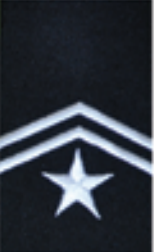
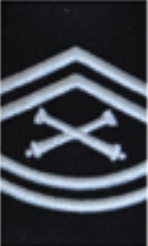
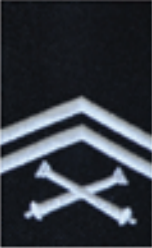
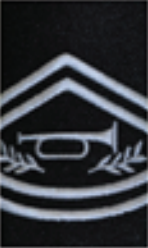
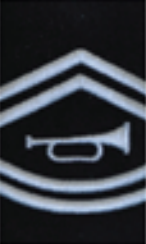
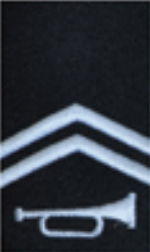
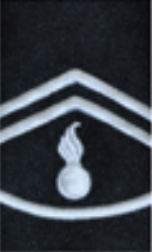
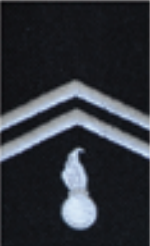
Cadet Special Designation Ranks
Category	Band^{1}	Color Guard^{2}			Artillery^{3}		Signal			Ordnance
Insignia
Rank	Cadet Supply Sergeant	Cadet Command Color Sergeant	Cadet Color Sergeant	Cadet Color Corporal	Cadet Artillery Sergeant	Cadet Artillery Corporal	Cadet Command Signal Sergeant	Cadet Signal Sergeant	Cadet Signal Corporal	Cadet Ordnance Sergeant	Cadet Ordnance Corporal
Abbreviation	C/SPG	C/CCS	C/CSG	C/CCP	C/ASG	C/ACP	C/CSS	C/SGS	C/SCP	C/OSG	C/OCP
^{1}Exclusive to the Regimental Band^{2}Exclusive to the Regimental Color Guard^{3}Exclusive to the crew of Skipper

== Cadet life ==
Cadets at Virginia Tech are integrated within a larger civilian institution, much like that of Texas A&M. This means that, excluding corps-specific classes and events, cadets interact with other students in classes, dining halls, clubs, Greek life, and most other aspects of college life. Weekend leisure time afforded to cadets is heavily dependent on one's ROTC track, the football season schedule, and pre-planned regimental activities such as pass in review. Cadets are required to live in corps barracks primarily within the campus' Upper Quad. Due to enrollment growth, recent classes of cadets have also lived in other parts of campus while new residence halls are being constructed. Cadets live on a strictly regimented schedule during the week. This typically involves waking up early for physical training and morning formation. Room and uniform inspections can also be expected, with the frequency of them determined by one's class. Freshman and sophomore cadets are given a curfew on weekdays in the form of evening call to quarters (ECQ). The presence of a military environment is intended to create a high degree of personal responsibility and discipline within every cadet. Cadets with more experience receive more personal freedom as well as increased responsibilities.

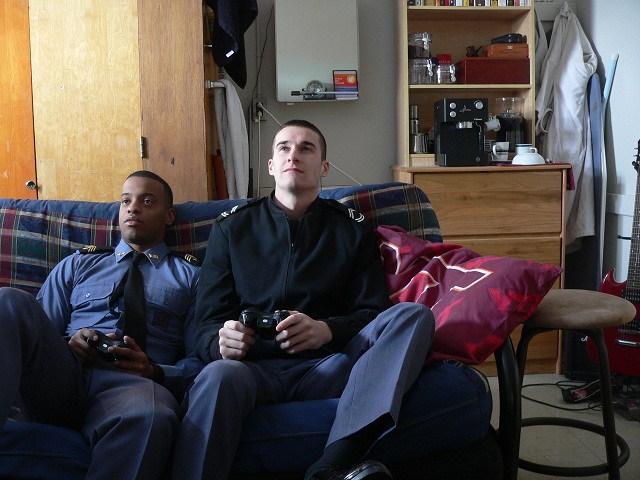
Two contemporary cadets in their living quarters.

=== Freshman training system ===
Freshmen in the Corps of Cadets (also known as First-Year Cadets, New Cadets, 4/C Cadets, or "Rats") undergo a strenuous process of adapting to the military environment embodied by the Corps. This usually takes place over the course of a cadet's first academic year, though transfers from both in and outside of the university also undergo this training system regardless of their academic status. Transfer students typically join their true academic class during subsequent years. Occasionally, a transfer cadet with only 4 remaining semesters may forego the second semester of their first year training in a process known as "early turning."

The life of a first-year cadet consists of many class-based restrictions. Most notably, these cadets are expected to both “drag” (briskly march on the right side of all halls and walkways) and sound off to all upperclassmen on the Upper Quad until they officially turn. Other “privileges” may be assigned based on the performance of an individual unit, which may be positive or negative in nature. These often include minor corrective actions like losing the right to use abbreviations, pockets, or particular facing movements when dragging.

==== Before classes ====
Prospective first-year cadets are required to arrive one week before the start of classes for training, also known as New Cadet Week. During this week, the new cadets are trained in drill with and without a weapon and also receive physical training to help prepare them for the rigors of leadership and the upcoming stresses of the academic year. The week ends with the New Cadet Parade, where the new cadets march under arms for their families and university staff, as well as a crowd of friends and fellow Virginia Tech students moving on to campus. The parade is intended to display the change in the new cadets and their acquisition of military knowledge and discipline. After this event, new cadets are given approximately 30 hours of pass so they can stay overnight off-campus with their families. However, beginning with the freshman class of 2026, New Cadets will be attending university and college information and academic sessions to prepare them for the start of the semester as part of Virginia Tech's “Weeks of Welcome” programming. Following New Cadet Week, the returning upperclass who were not cadre, cadre training assistants, Color Guardsmen, Highty-Tighties, Commanders and their Staffs, Obstacle Course Team, Rappel Tower Committee, Skipper Crew, and Medical Staff move into their rooms.

==== Red Phase ====
The cadet training system at Virginia Tech has evolved throughout the decades, with each iteration seeking to improve the quality of leader produced by the program. Beginning with the class of 2004, the current cadet training system was implemented. The new cadets officially begin Red Phase upon returning from pass at 1830 (6:30 pm) for their first study hours Sunday evening. A freshman cadet typically has eight-and-a-half hours of unstructured time during a weekday in which to attend classes, study, run errands, and workout. Red Phase, like the color red, is the most intense phase, and the new cadets continue to be trained by their cadre (juniors and seniors who were specifically trained to train the freshmen). They will be expected to learn topics from The Guidon, the Virginia Tech Corps of Cadets book of knowledge and will be quizzed on topics from the Guidon during "Freshmen Online", more commonly referred to as "onlines". Onlines are conducted Monday through Friday and last for one-half hour, However, as of the fall 2020 semester, freshmen training on weekdays has ceased with the exception of ROTC instruction. Onlines typically went away at the end of Red Phase. In addition to onlines, freshmen will begin having pass (also known as U-pass or Unity pass) every weekend night, where the cadre will conduct rigorous training reminiscent of New Cadet Week. Common activities during weekend pass include Guidon quizzes, physical training with and without rifles, dragging with and without rifles, and changing into uniforms or remaking beds under time constraints.

The Caldwell March I is named after Addison Caldwell, who walked 26 miles (42 km) to enroll as the first student at Virginia Agriculture and Mechanical College (V.A.M.C.) (Virginia Tech). The march commemorates Addison's historic journey and is broken into two 13-mile (21 km) hikes. The fall hike begins at the Caldwell Homestead in Craig County and loosely follows the original hike along parts of the Appalachian Trail, before ending at a park named after the Caldwell brothers, "Caldwell fields". Homer Hickam, a former cadet and co-creator of Skipper, sometimes joins the cadets on this momentous hike. The successful completion of the fall hike marks the end of the red phase for the first year cadets.

It is the Virginia Tech Board of Visitors' policy, that any freshman or transfer cadet who leaves the Corps before the end of Red Phase (which is usually defined by the university's last day to withdraw without penalty in the fall semester), must leave the university and begin again in the spring semester (they do not have to re-apply to the university for admission).

==== White Phase ====
White Phase begins after the Caldwell March in October and lasts until the conclusion of Military Weekend in February. During White Phase, freshman cadets attend Cadet Leader School taught by the Commandant's Staff and upperclassman cadets. During the Thursday afternoon period reserved normally for the Corps of Cadets lab, freshmen are educated in leadership responsibilities and role play scenarios to learn solutions to different situations. White Phase normally terminates at the annual Military Ball during Military Weekend (typically in the middle of February). During White Phase, weekend passes are still conducted by the cadre, however based on the previous week's performance pass may be something enjoyable such as a group trip to a movie theater.

==== Blue Phase ====
At the beginning of Blue Phase, freshmen cadets are awarded new privileges and continue in their transition from follower-ship to leadership. Freshman cadets are evaluated during this time for their competence as Fire Team Leaders. Marking the end of freshmen cadet training year is the second half of the Caldwell March. After successful completion of the march, the freshman cadets are "turned" to upperclassman status for the remainder of the year. During this period, the freshman cadets will be partially integrated into their future companies, providing them with valuable acclimation time in order to prepare themselves for their sophomore challenges.

The Caldwell March II is the final march freshmen cadets will do before they turn and become upperclassmen. At the end of the march, all cadets will be at the VT to congratulate the completion of the freshmen cadets' march.

==== Gold Phase ====
In the Fall of 2024, cadet leadership has announced Gold Phase starting Spring of 2025.

=== Organizations ===
In addition to being involved in all other clubs the university has to offer, the Virginia Tech Corps of Cadets sanctions over 30 additional organizations. The privilege to be a part of these activities is typically afforded to cadets in their second semester of their freshman year. Some of these organizations include:

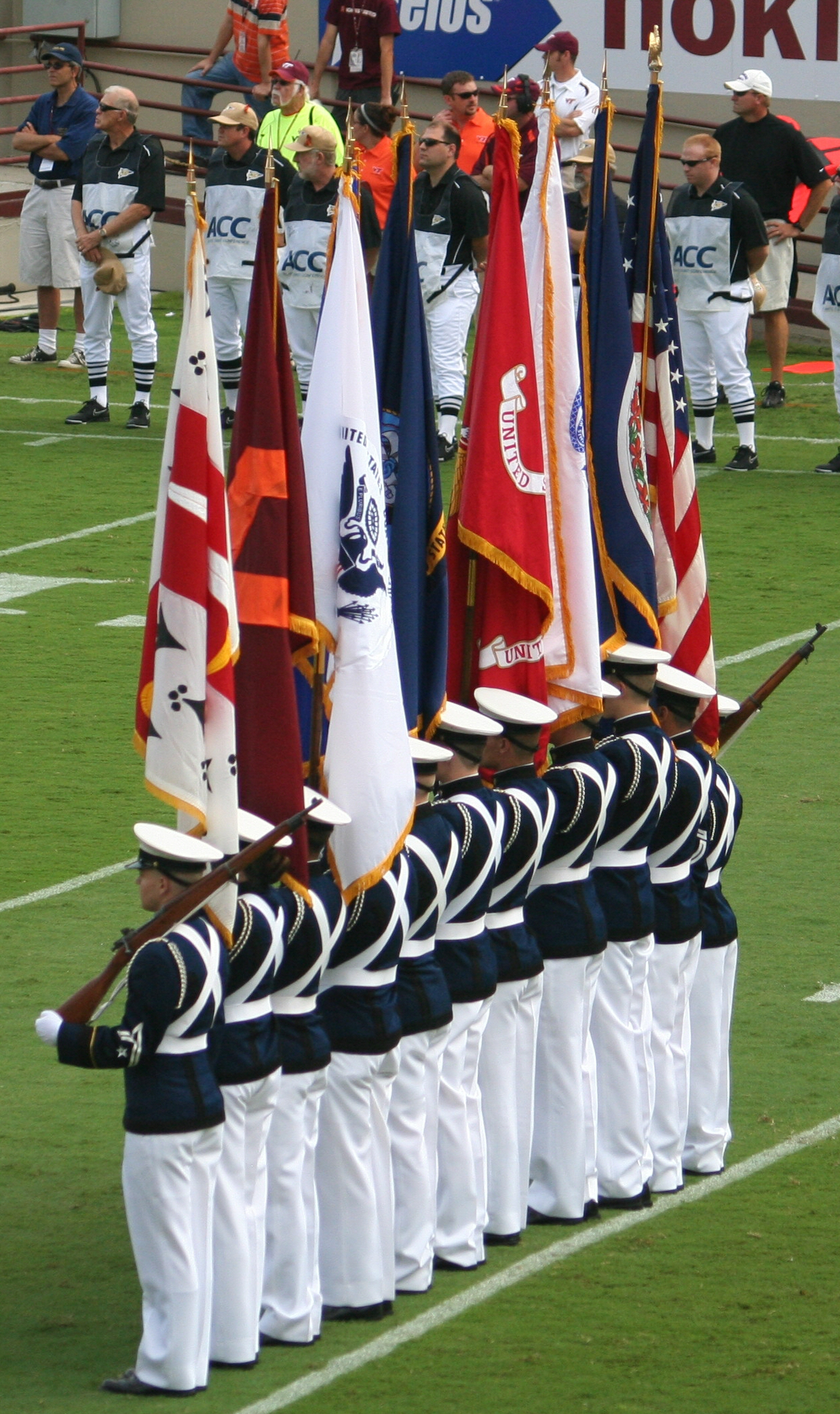
The Virginia Tech Corps of Cadets Color Guard on display at the opening game for the 2007 Virginia Tech Hokies football team

- Air Force Flyers (Air Force ROTC)
- Armed Forces Special Operations Prep Team [AFSOPT] (Primarily Air Force ROTC but anyone can join)
- Asian American Cadet Organization (AACO)
- Black Cadet Organization (BCO)
- Cadet Alumni Team (CAT)
- Coast Guard Auxiliary
- Color Guard
- Conrad Cavalry
- Cyber Team
- Eagle Scout Association
- Esprit de Corps
- Fenix
- Gregory Guard
- Growley Team
- Hall Council
- Highty-Tighties (Technically the HTs are not a corps organization but one of the regular companies of the regiment)
- Historian Staff
- Marksmanship Unit
- Medic Staff
- Men's and Women's Basketball
- Naval Special Operations Preparatory Team (Navy ROTC)
- O-Course Committee
- Ordnance Staff
- Pipes and Drums
- Ranger Company (Army ROTC)
- Rappel Tower Committee
- Robert Edward Femoyer Service Squadron (Air Force ROTC)
- Sash and Saber Honor Society
- Scabbard and Blade Honor Society
- Space Training Advancement and Readiness Squadron [STARS] (Air Force ROTC)
- Skipper Crew
- Society of American Military Engineers
- VT Valor

== Uniforms and awards ==
=== Uniforms ===
Cadets at Virginia Tech are required to wear the prescribed Uniform of the Day (UOD) from 0700 to 1700 Monday through Thursday and 0700–1400 on Friday. This is designated by the regimental staff and senior leadership of the Corps. Proper uniform wear and maintenance is a fundamental part of maintaining the military discipline essential to the Corps of Cadets. The ability to change out of uniforms at the end of the duty day and in particular portions of the Upper Quad is considered a privilege and likewise must be earned by a class. For first-year cadets, this typically comes late in the academic year.

While participating in a cadet's individual ROTC's activities and labs, they may change out of the Corps Uniform of the Day into the appropriate branch uniform after 1400 on Tuesdays during the fall semester. During the spring semester, ROTC uniforms may be assigned as the Uniform of the Day. Physical training uniforms for individual ROTC programs can be utilized in the mornings during which a cadet has PT.

==== Dress uniforms ====
Uniforms of this type are worn for more formal events. Ribbons, pins, and cords are authorized for wear.

- Dress A

Consists of a blue blouse, white cross-belts, and black low-quarter shoes. Trousers and service covers are dependent on the season.

Summer - White trousers, service cover and white gloves.
Winter - Gray trousers, blue service color and black gloves.

Seniors in this uniform can wear additional dress items such as sashes and sabres.

- Dress B

Consists of a blue blouse and black low-quarter shoes. Trousers and service covers are dependent on the season.

Summer - White trousers and service cover.
Winter - Gray trousers and blue service color.

Unlike that of Dress A, additional decorative garments and cross-belts aren't worn in Dress B.

- Paletot Mess Dress

Consists of a white blouse, white trousers, and black low-quarter shoes. Females have the option of wearing a white skirt and black pumps as an alternative.
Designated as the formal mess uniform for all cadets, this is the most formal attire worn by the Corps and is usually reserved for banquets, balls, and ceremonies.

==== Service uniforms ====
These uniforms are the typical duty day uniforms of cadets and are worn at many different functions, usually without the expectation of strenuous physical activity which may tarnish them. Ribbons and pins are authorized for wear.

- Summer Service ("White Shirt")

Consists of a white shirt, gray trousers, black low-quarter shoes, black belt (white for freshmen), and blue service cover. Alternatively, garrison covers may be prescribed, though this is a rare occurrence and is seldom issued.

- Winter Service ("Gray Bag")

Consists of a gray shirt, gray trousers, black low-quarter shoes, black tie, black belt (white for freshmen), and blue service cover. Like in "White Shirt," garrison covers may be worn.

==== Other uniforms ====
- Operational Camouflage Pattern (OCPs)

Consists of a OCP blouse, cover, and trousers as well as tan boots and a sand undershirt. Some organizations within the Corps of Cadets are authorized berets in place of traditional OCP Patrol covers.
This uniform can be worn to all functions at which a service uniform can be assigned, in addition to duties which require physical activity. As a result, it is considered one of the most versatile uniforms.

- "Hokie Bag"

Consists of a maroon polo shirt, khaki trousers, and either a black belt and low quarters or a brown belt and brown shoes.

- "Victory Bag"

Consists of a maroon Hokie spirit shirt, jeans or khakis, and black or brown dress shoes or white sneakers. Hokie baseball spirit caps are optional. Victory Bag is exclusive to VTCC upperclassmen, unless authorized by the Regimental Commander

- Physical Training Uniform

Consists of a black t-shirt, black shorts, and running shoes. In the winter, additional garments such as gloves, a long-sleeved maroon t-shirt, sweatshirts, and sweatpants are issued.

==== Class distinguishing features ====
Most notably, first-year cadets in the Corps of Cadets wear a white cloth belt in their service uniforms. This belt is known as the "rat belt," after the nickname assigned to these cadets. On the last day of classes, the tradition of "My Last Damn Rat Belt" occurs when freshman cadets decorate each-others belts with signatures, slogans, and memories. This tradition is meant to signify the communal hardship shared by cadets in their first year. First-year cadets have no insignia on their covers while in OCPs. Similarly, freshmen do not have rank insignias on their uniforms (as expected of Cadet Privates) and can be distinguished by said absence. The trim of their garrison covers is black.

Typically ranking NCOs within the Corps of Cadets, sophomore and junior cadets have similar uniform appearances. In OCPs, the covers of these cadets display the Corps Crest. One can best distinguish these classes based on the sleeves of a cadet's dress uniform, as the cuffs will have gold stripes which reflect the number of years a cadet has completed. Garrison covers have a red trim for sophomores and silver trim for juniors.

Senior cadets are the officers of the Corps. Likewise, they have numerous distinguishing features which come with their uniforms. In the Dress A uniform, seniors may adorn red sashes (known as OD and OG wraps), sabres, and capes depending on the occasion. On the collar of both dress uniforms, an underclassmen typically has two circular devices known as "headlights" which designate a particular cadet's ROTC track. For seniors, these are replaced with larger gold insignias. Said insignias are also worn with a senior's service uniforms. In the Winter Service uniform ("Gray Bag"), seniors have their ties fully extended while underclassmen tuck theirs between the second and third buttons. The service cover of seniors has a gold chinstrap, which contrasts with the black chinstraps of underclassmen. Fifth-year seniors ("Skippers") have silver chinstraps. While in OCPs, senior cadets wear a gold VPI device on their covers. The trim of their garrison covers is gold.

=== Awards ===
==== Beverly S. Parrish Jr. Memorial Award ("Gold Cord") ====
The Beverly S. Parrish Jr. Memorial Award is the award presented to the company with the highest number of points at the end of any given academic year. This award is graded based on various criteria such as academic performance, recruiting efforts, cadet retention, discipline, room and uniform inspections, and drill performance. The cadets of the winning company are given a gold cord, which may be worn with dress uniforms and is the sake of its nickname. The company itself is granted a plaque and a gold steamer to be hung atop the company's guidon. The Gold Cord is the most anticipated and highly competitive award offered by the Corps, as it is the ultimate representation of all-around unit excellence within the Corps of Cadets.

==== Ribbons and cords ====
Ribbons and cords are given to cadets for a variety of achievements. This typically includes academic excellence, leadership performance, and membership in Corps organizations. Many of these awards overlap and have both a ribbon and cord associated with them.

Ribbons and wreath devices are distributed to cadets based on one's individual grade point average (GPA). It is often the first ribbon that a first-year cadet may wear on their uniforms.

- Gold Level: 3.75 - 4.0
- Orange Level: 3.4 - 3.74
- Maroon Level: 3.0 - 3.39

== Notes ==
1. From the day of its founding to the present Virginia Polytechnic Institute and State University has had a commandant of cadets. The session of 1880-1882 is unique however. The Board of Visitors failed to appoint either a commandant or a president. Acting President Hart there upon appointed a senior cadet as acting commandant and permitted this individual to select other seniors as acting assistant commandants. With this one exception all commandants have been appointed by the Board of Visitors."

== See also ==
- Virginia Tech
- Highty Tighties
- Senior Military College
- Skipper Cannon
