= Lane Stadium =

American football stadium on the Virginia Tech campus in Blacksburg, VA, US

Lane Stadium/Worsham Field
- The Terrordome
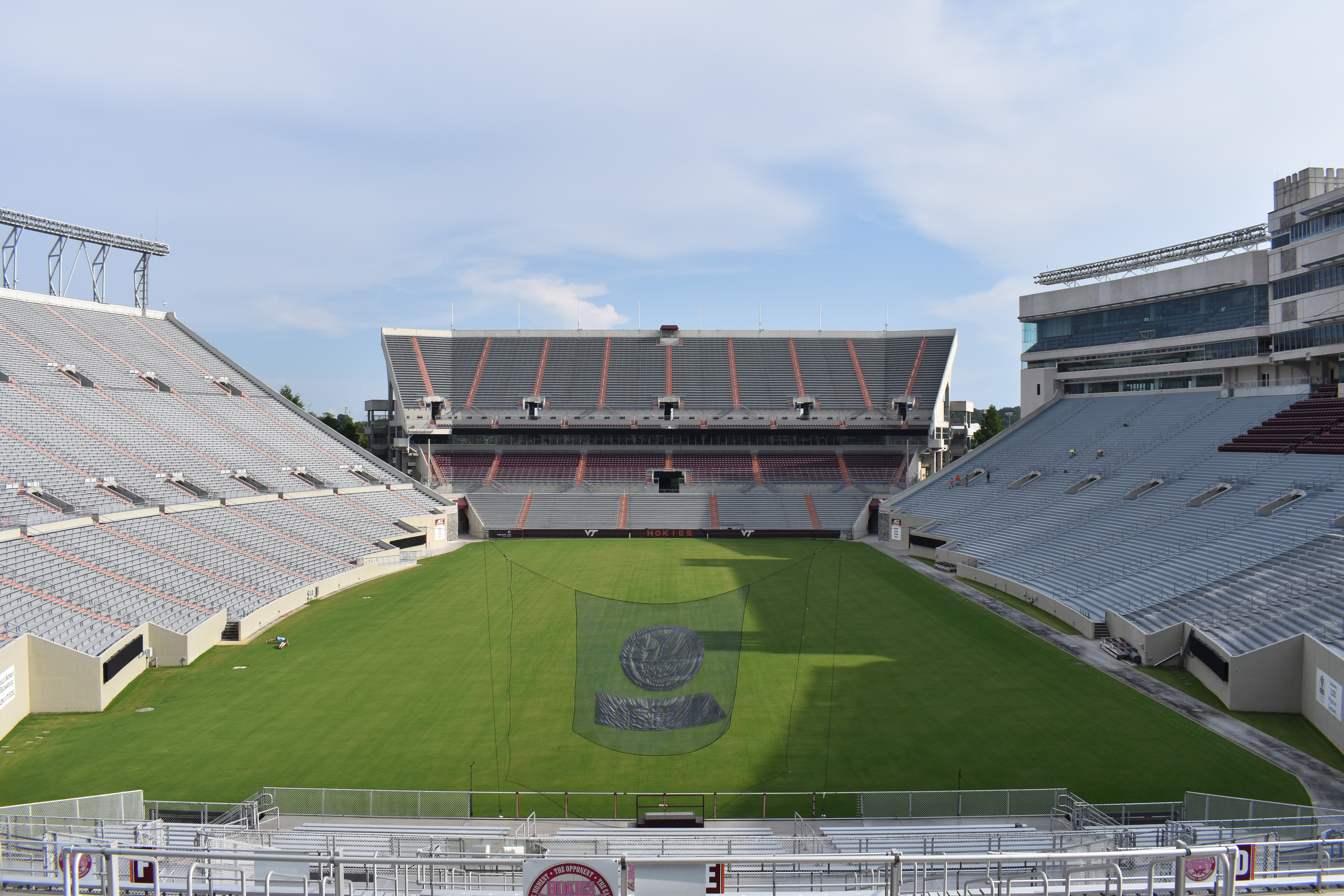
- The south stand of Lane Stadium as seen in July 2020

- Location in Virginia Location in the United States
- Location: 285 Beamer Way; Blacksburg, Virginia, U.S.
- Coordinates: 37°13′12″N 80°25′05″W
- Owner: Virginia Polytechnic Institute and State University
- Capacity: 65,632 (total); 1,200 (Club Seating); 240 (Luxury Seating – 15 Suites)
- Surface: 'Latitude 36' Bermudagrass overseeded with Perennial Ryegrass in the fall

Construction
- Groundbreaking: April 1, 1964
- Opened: September 24, 1965; 61 years ago
- Renovated: 1989, 1994, 1998, 2006, 2012, 2013
- Expanded: 1980, 1999, 2000, 2002, 2004
- Cost: $3.5 million ($35.8 million in 2025)
- Architects: Carneal and Johnston; Smithey and Boynton
- General contractors: Dobyns, Inc.

Tenant
- Virginia Tech Hokies (NCAA) (1965–present)

Lane Stadium is a college football stadium in the eastern United States, located on the campus of Virginia Polytechnic Institute and State University (Virginia Tech) in Blacksburg, Virginia. The playing surface of the stadium is named Worsham Field. The home field of the Virginia Tech Hokies of the Atlantic Coast Conference (ACC), it was rated the number one home field advantage in all of college football in 2005 by Rivals.com. In 2007, it was ranked #2 on ESPN.com's "Top 10 Scariest Places To Play." The stadium is named for Edward Hudson Lane, a former student, local businessman, and Virginia Tech booster, while the playing surface is named for Wes Worsham, a university donor and booster.

From 1982 to 2014, Lane Stadium had the highest elevation of any Football Bowl Subdivision stadium in the eastern United States, at 2,057 feet (627 m) above sea level.

== History ==
=== Beginning ===
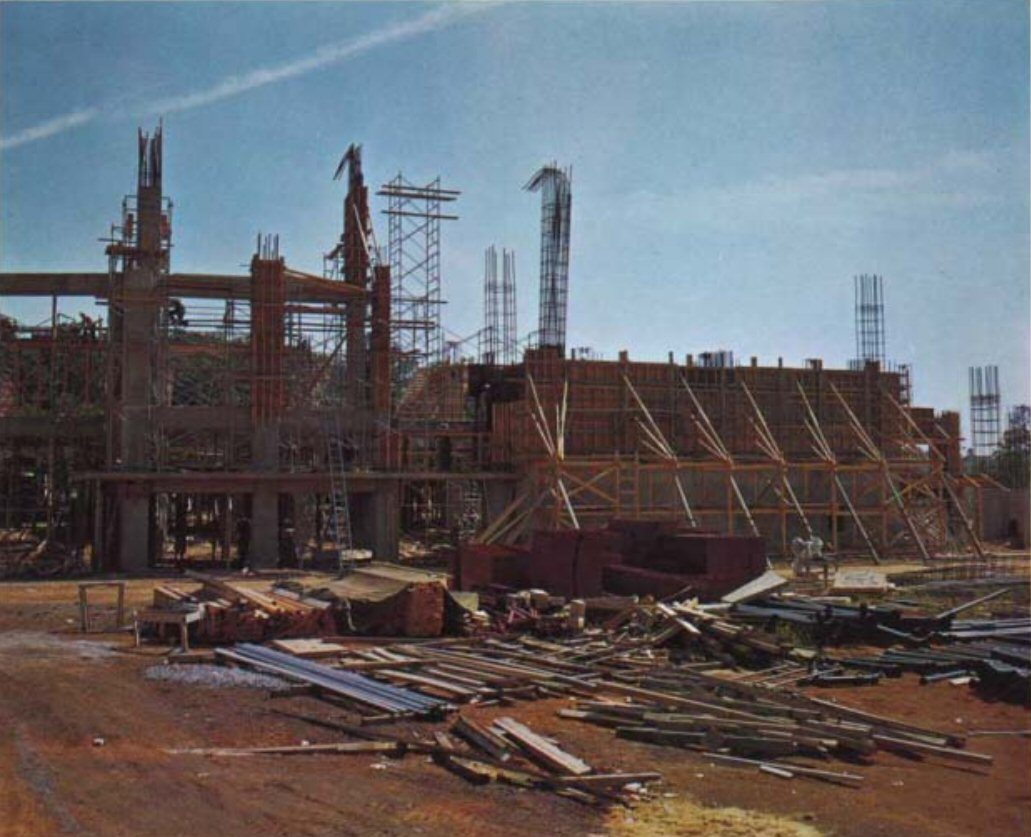
Lane Stadium under construction

In 1963, school administrator Stuart K. Cassell, namesake of Cassell Coliseum, proposed building a larger stadium to replace the 17,000-seat Miles Stadium, and construction began on April 1, 1964. It took a total of four years to complete construction, but its first game was played in 1965, when VT beat William & Mary 9–7. At the time, only the west stands and center section of the east bleachers were completed; construction was completed summer of 1968, with an official cost of $3.5 million. It seated 35,050 and featured a press box for guests, writers, stats crew-members, scouts, and coaches. The playing field has a conventional north–south alignment with the press box along the west sideline.

The stadium is named after Edward Hudson Lane (1891–1973), a VPI graduate and a 1960s member of the Board of Visitors. Lane founded the Lane Company Inc., of Altavista, known for their dominance of the cedar chest business, a business started in 1912 with the technical help of Lane's old shop class professor from Tech. In the 1960s, Lane headed an educational foundation project which raised over $3 million for the original construction, with his challenge gift of Lane Company stock comprising the lead gift. Like many stadiums built at the time, it consisted of two bowed sideline grandstands with free-standing bleachers behind the end zones. The stadium's original form was substantially similar to that of BB&T Field at Wake Forest and Memorial Stadium at Indiana University.

=== Expansion renovations and upgrades ===
==== 1980s and 1990s ====
Lane Stadium remained generally unchanged for 20 years, but in 1980 the east stands were expanded, increasing the stadium capacity to 52,500. Two years later, the Stadium installed a brand-new lighting system that would help the team get its first nationally broadcast game on WTBS, a 21–14 win over their state rivals, the Virginia Cavaliers.

Prior to the 1989 season, the stadium added 16 flags and received a new paint job, including the maroon and orange stripes still inside the stadium.

On September 5, 1992, during the season opener against James Madison, Lane Stadium's playing surface was dedicated in honor of longtime supporters from Kilmarnock, Wes and Janet Worsham and renamed Worsham Field. The Worshams pledged $1 million to the university's Second Century Campaign, which raised over $18.6 million, $1.7 million more than the original goal.

In the spring of 1994, renovations were completed on seven lower sections of the east stands. Renovations also included replacing concrete risers and the addition of wheelchair seating decreasing capacity to 50,000. Also, before the 1994 season, plaques bearing retired numbers of Tech heroes Bruce Smith, Carroll Dale, Jim Pyne, and Frank Loria were added to the wall in the north end zone. However, with the later addition of the north end zone seats, the four retired numbers now fly on flag poles above those stands.

Before the start of the 1998 season, the oldest bleachers were replaced with new locust wood and the stands were waterproofed. On the east side, the roof on the old visitors' locker room was replaced along with the bleachers above the dressing room.

==== North end zone expansion ====
Before the 1999 season, the university started work on the north end zone. The summer of 1999 saw the addition of roughly 2,100 seats to the north end zone increasing capacity to 53,130. In the summer of 2000, 3,000 more permanent bleacher seats were added to the north end zone increasing capacity to 56,272. That summer also saw the addition of a new scoreboard, known as Hokievision, installed behind the north end zone. The summer of 2001 saw the latest round of additions to north end zone bleachers — 600 seats for The Marching Virginians. This move brought the capacity down to 53,662.

==== 2000–present ====
===== South end zone expansion =====
Prior to the 2002 season, the stadium saw 11,120 seats added in the south end zone to effectively enclose that end of the stadium increasing capacity to 65,115. The double-deck structure is similar to that of the Cleveland Browns' "Dawg Pound" section. It has bleacher, bench-back, and club seats. The structure is enclosed, but has gaps between the older structures and itself. This is the result of building codes and a desire to get fans even closer to the field.

===== West Side press box expansion =====
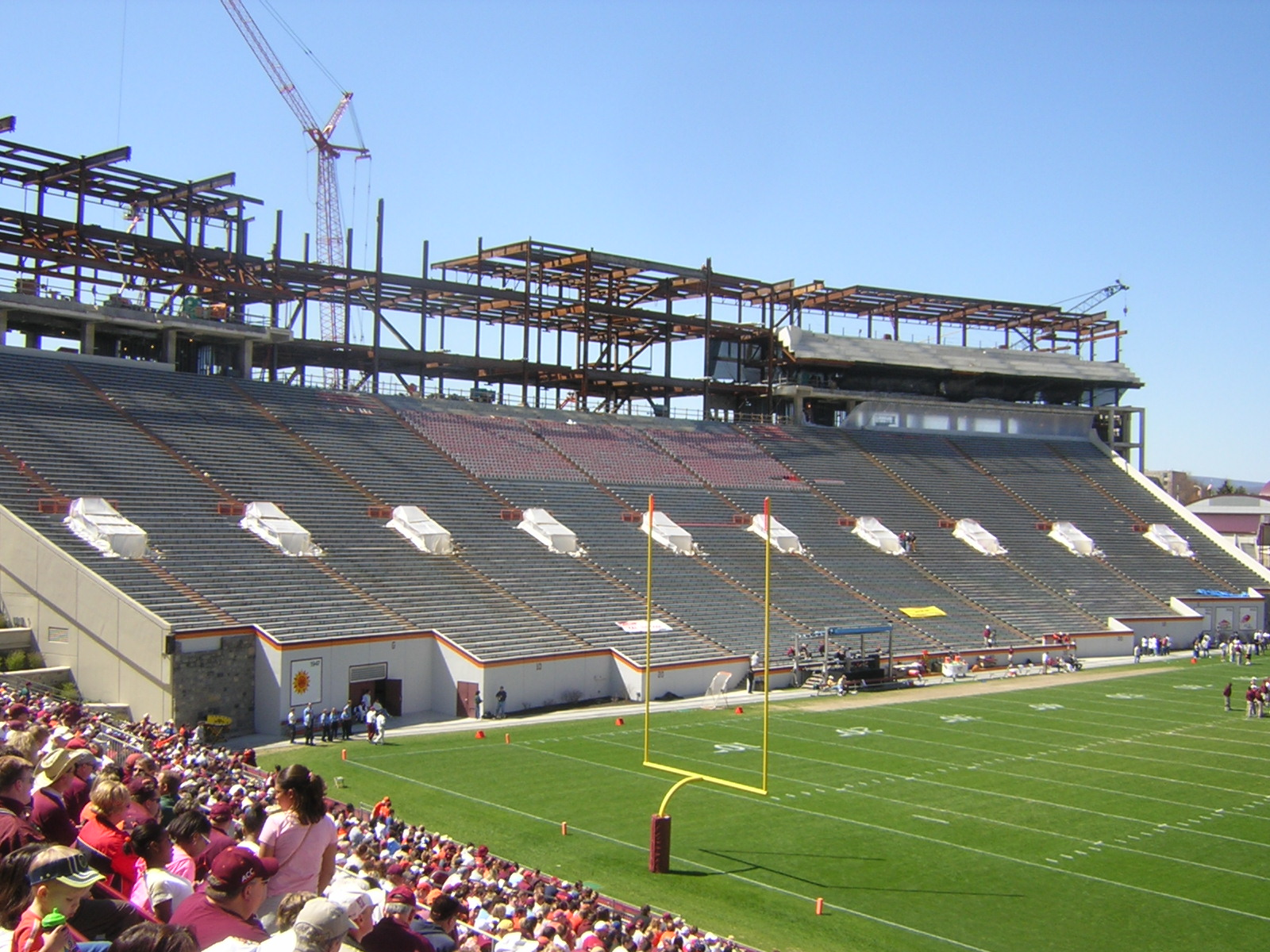
View of the stadium expansion works during a Spring Game in 2005

Perhaps the biggest addition to Lane Stadium was completed prior to the 2006 season. After the 2004 season, the old press box was removed and construction began on this west-side expansion, filling in to match what was built up during the 2004 season. The new boxes include a new press area, on the side toward the south end zone, with a dining area and improved facilities. Also, the fencing that surrounds the stadium was removed, and the area on the west side exterior of the stadium landscaped with walkways and a weekday parking lot for ticket patrons and Hall of Fame and Hokie Club visitors. New luxury suites, President's area, four private club seating areas, concession stands, ticket office, athletic fund offices, an Athletics Hall of Fame, and student academic services area were also included in this latest project. A two tier grandstand featuring 11,000 seats, 15 luxury suites, and a new visitor's locker room was completed. The $52.5 million expansion includes 23 luxury suites, a new press box, and club seating. The addition increased Lane Stadium's seating capacity to 66,233.

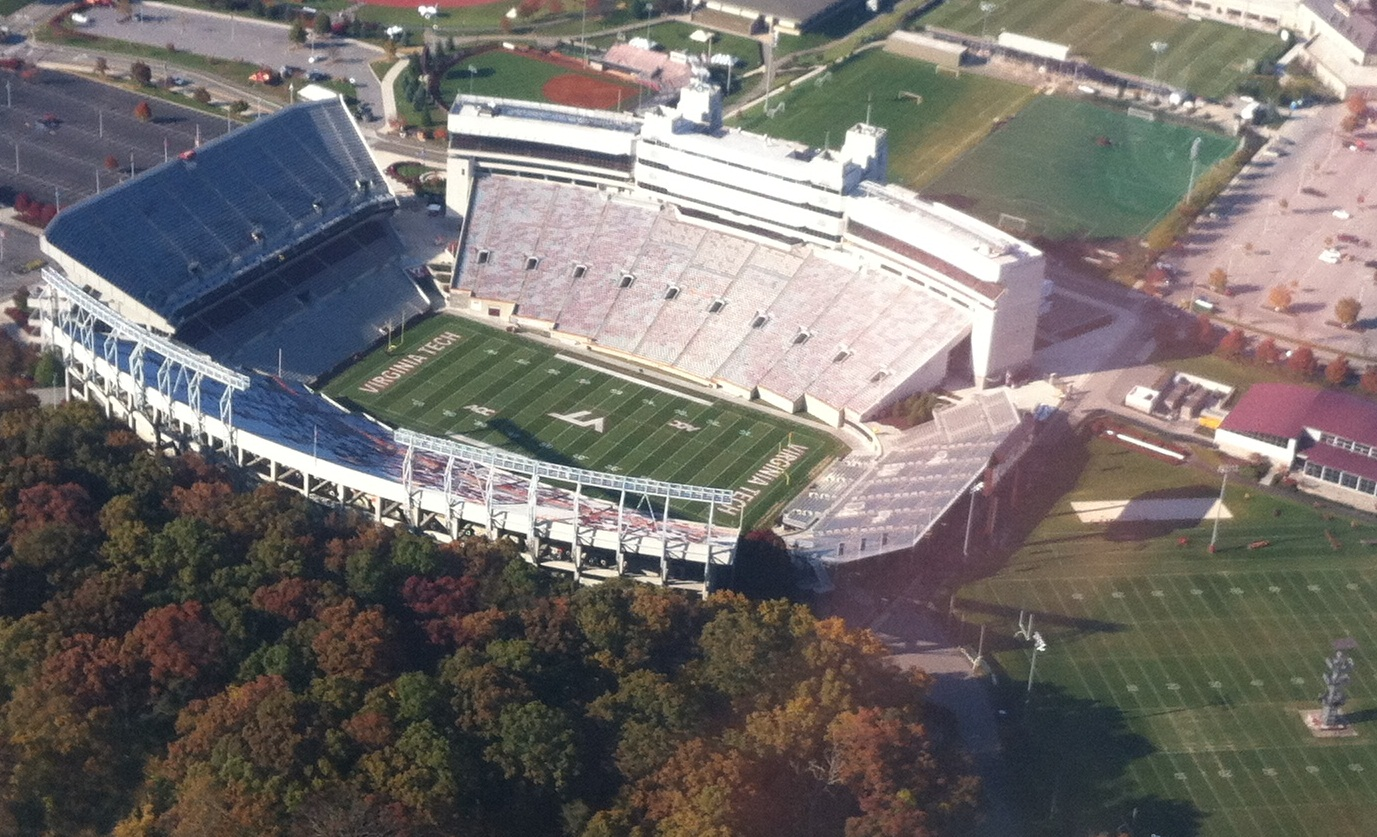
Aerial view of the stadium in 2011

Hokie Stone was added to the walls of each end zone in 2005. New kicking nets were also installed in both end zones. A new, larger video screen, called 'HokieVision' was also added in the north endzone. Improved playing surface lighting was added as part of the renovation as well. The traditional "Home of the Fighting Gobblers" sign was also removed from the West Stands during this renovation (the sign is currently located above the HokieShop in the West Stands concourse). In an article in "The Roanoke Times" newspaper, it stated that Tech was not going to even think about renovating Lane Stadium again until about 2013, and it also stated that when Tech renovates Lane Stadium, the university will most likely tear down the student's section and replace it with new concrete bleachers and increase that area's capacity, and also add suites on top of it, and possibly connect the south side with the east and west sides.

Prior to the 2012 season, the West Side Outdoor Club seating area was completely renovated and new luxury chairback seats were installed. The entire seating structure was reconfigured, which decreased the number of seating rows, subsequently allowing for more legroom from row to row, and reduced capacity to 65,632.

===== New video scoreboard =====
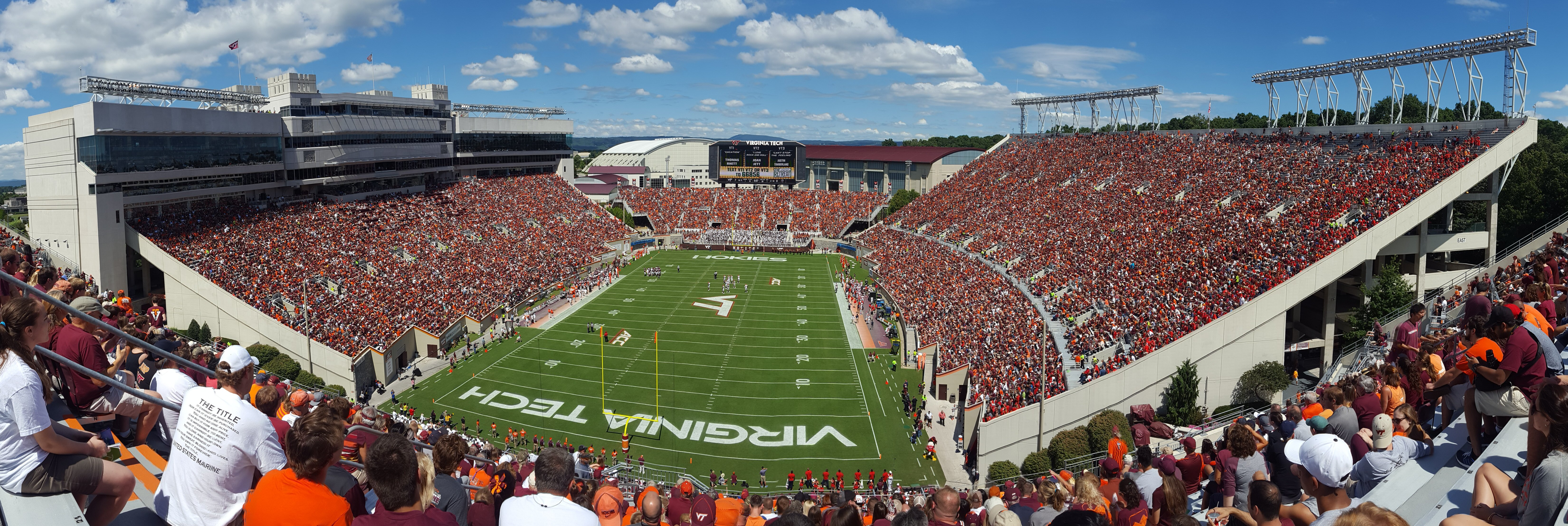
View from the South endzone in 2016

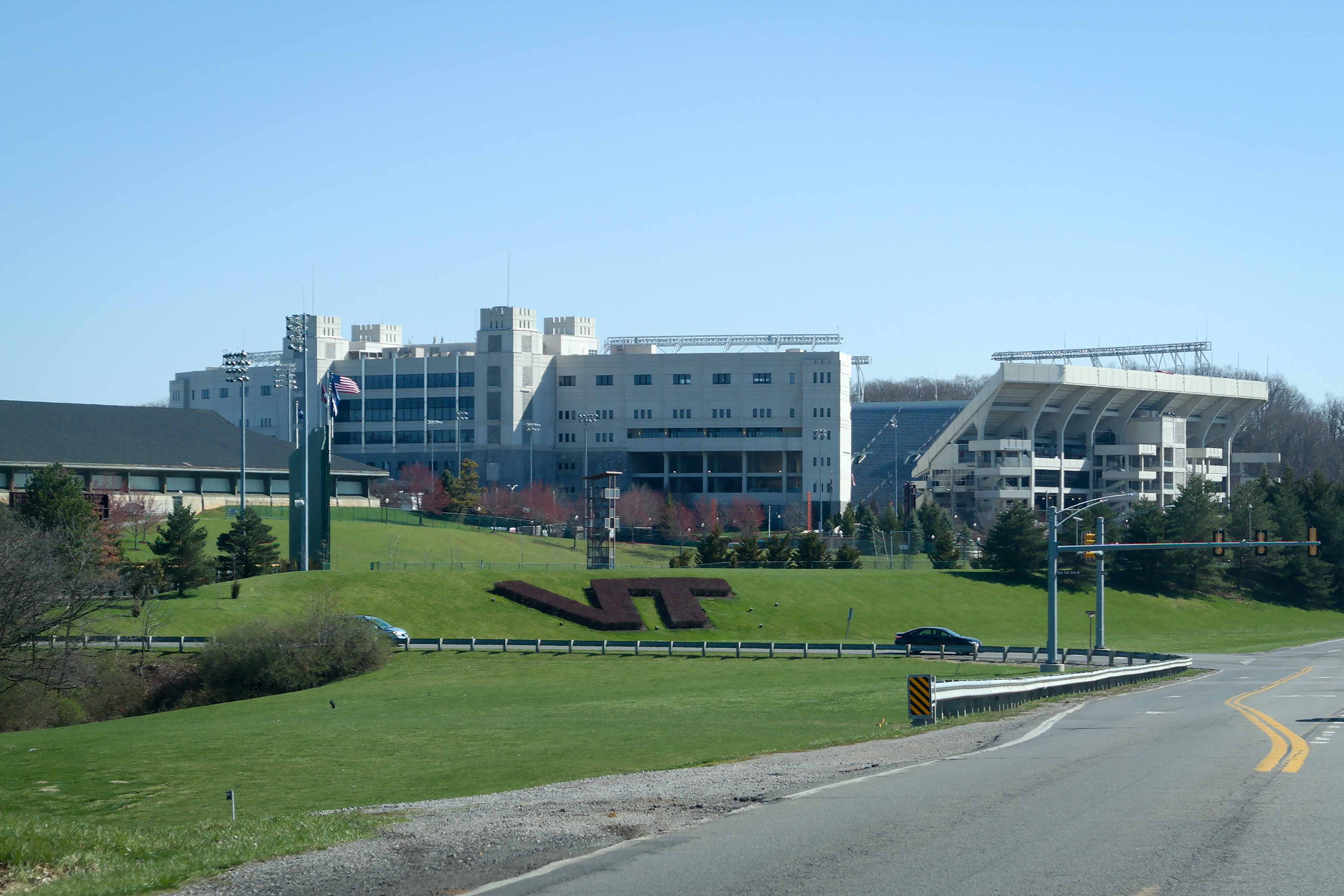
Exterior view taken in 2015

In time for the start of the 2013 season, a new "Hokie Vision" video scoreboard was installed. This board is completely LED and the screen itself would completely contain the size of the old scoreboard. There are four pylons holding up the board: the smaller, center two were used as the pylons for the old board and the outer two (both larger) are used in addition to the original pylons to hold up the new board. This new scoreboard ranks third largest college football scoreboard.

===== Bleacher replacement =====
A portion of the East stands' bleachers were replaced in Spring/Summer of 2017.

===== Frank Beamer statue =====
During the 2018 season, Virginia Tech unveiled a commissioned statue of former head coach Frank Beamer in front of Lane Stadium's main entrance. The statue was erected to pay tribute to Beamer who coached at his alma mater for 29 seasons, winning 238 games and guiding the Hokies to 23 straight bowl games. The former coach was inducted into the College Football Hall of Fame in 2018.

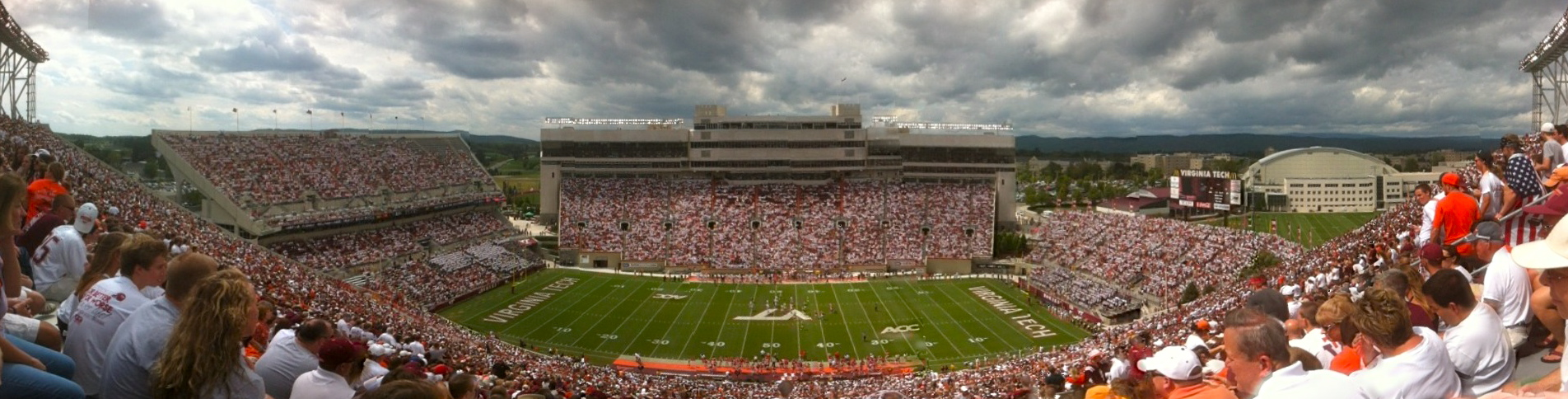
Panorama of Lane Stadium during the "white out" Virginia Tech vs. Austin Peay football game, September 8, 2012

===== Metallica concert =====
On May 7, 2025, heavy metal band Metallica performed at the stadium as part of their M72 World Tour, with Pantera and Suicidal Tendencies as show openers. Their song "Enter Sandman" has been used as the football team's entrance to the stadium for twenty-five years. Metallica is the first band to perform a revenue producing concert at the stadium, as well as offering student seating for their show. The band's performance of "Enter Sandman", combined with the large crowd jumping and cheering, generated enough ground movement and tremors to be registered as a small earthquake by the Virginia Tech Seismological Observatory.

== Statistics and milestones ==
Lane Stadium - Quick Facts
Seasons in Use	57th Season
Number of sold-out games	116 (as of Nov 18, 2023)
Overall Record	242–97–6 (.710), Games: 345
ACC Record	43–25 (.632), Games: 68
vs. Non-Conference	150–56–6 (.722), Games: 212
vs. Ranked Teams	21–25 (.457) Games: 46

Milestone	Date	Opponent	Score
First Game/First Win at Lane Stadium	October 2, 1965	William & Mary	W 9–7
First Television Game (ABC)	October 29, 1966	Florida State	W 23–21
25th Win at Lane Stadium	October 11, 1975	Florida State	W 13–10
50th Win at Lane Stadium	October 3, 1981	Memphis State	W 17–13
First CBS Game	September 18, 1982	Miami (FL)	L 8–14
First Night Game	November 25, 1982	Virginia	W 21–14
First TBS Game	November 25, 1982	Virginia	W 21–14
First Thursday Night Game	November 25, 1982	Virginia	W 21–14
First Game Under Head Coach Frank Beamer	September 12, 1987	Clemson	L 10–22
First Win Under Head Coach Frank Beamer	October 3, 1987	Navy	W 31–11
75th Win at Lane Stadium	October 3, 1987	Navy	W 31–11
First ESPN Game	November 24, 1990	Virginia	W 38–13
First Big East Game	September 26, 1992	West Virginia	L 7–16
First Big East Win	October 16, 1993	Temple	W 55–7
100th Win at Lane Stadium	September 22, 1994	West Virginia	W 34–6
Program's 1,000th Game	September 4, 1999	James Madison	W 47–0
125th Win at Lane Stadium	September 23, 1999	Clemson	W 31–11
ESPN College GameDay - First Appearance	October 16, 1999	Syracuse	W 62–0
ESPN College GameDay - Second Appearance	November 13, 1999	Miami (FL)	W 43–10
ESPN College GameDay - Third Appearance / Lee Corso's car lightning strike	August 30, 2000	Georgia Tech	Canceled
Frank Beamer's 100th Win at Virginia Tech	September 1, 2001	Connecticut	W 52–10
Virginia Tech's 600th win overall	September 6, 2003	James Madison	W 43–0
150th Win at Lane Stadium	November 1, 2003	Miami (FL)	W 31–7
First ACC Game and Win	September 18, 2004	Duke	W 41–17
ESPN College GameDay - Fourth Appearance	September 24, 2005	Georgia Tech	W 51–7
ESPN College GameDay - Fifth Appearance	November 5, 2005	Miami (FL)	L 7–27
ESPN College GameDay - Sixth Appearance	September 1, 2007	East Carolina	W 17–7
Frank Beamer's 200th overall win	September 15, 2007	Ohio	W 28–7
Frank Beamer's First win vs. Bobby Bowden & Florida State Seminoles	November 10, 2007	Florida State	W 40–21
250th game at Lane Stadium	November 6, 2008	Maryland	W 23–13
First overtime game	September 3, 2012	Georgia Tech	W 20–17
200th Win at Lane Stadium	October 13, 2012	Duke	W 41–20
Consecutive home game sellout streak	Nov.1998 - Sep.2013	W. Carolina	W 45–3
50th Anniversary of Lane Stadium	August 30, 2014	William & Mary	W 34–9
ESPN College GameDay - Seventh Appearance	September 7, 2015	Ohio State	L 24–42
First Game under Head Coach Justin Fuente	September 3, 2016	Liberty	W 36–13
50th ACC home game	September 17, 2016	Boston College	W 49–0
300th Game at Lane Stadium & 100th ACC game	October 20, 2016	Miami (FL)	W 37–16
ESPN College Gameday - Eighth Appearance	September 30, 2017	Clemson	L 31–17
100th Sold out game at Lane Stadium	September 30, 2017	Clemson	L 31–17

== Traditions ==
=== Corps of Cadets ===
Skipper in the south end zone during pregame

the Hokie Bird bench presses a Virginia Tech score

The Marching Virginians sousaphone section performs the Hokie Pokie in the north end zone

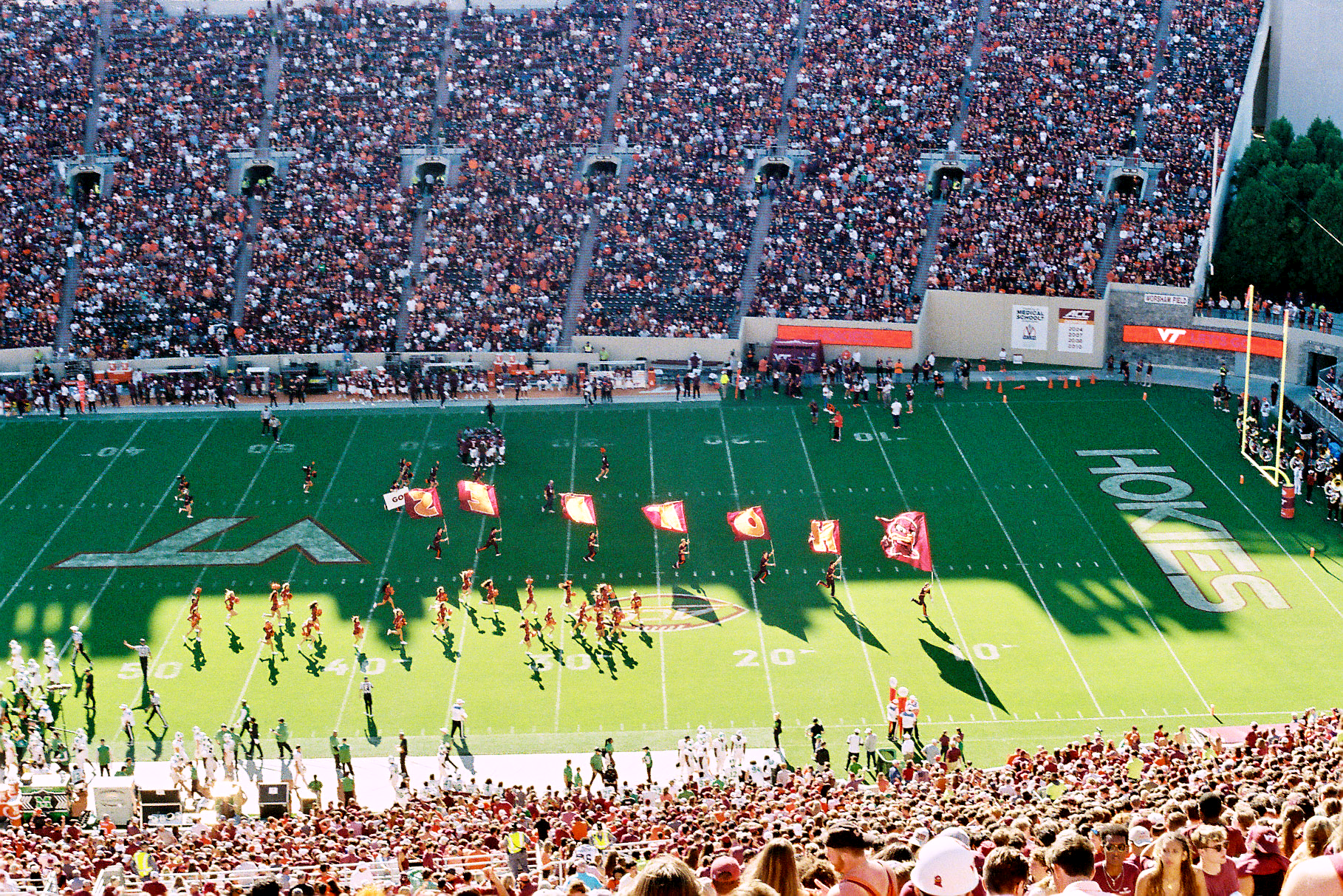
Virginia Tech Flag Bearers Run Out On Field

- Virginia Tech's Corps of Cadets march into Lane Stadium and stand in formation on the field during the National Anthem and Rendering of Colors.
- The Corps of Cadets sit together in the lower level of the South end zone stands during every home game.
- Freshman cadets do push-ups on the shoulders of their classmates equal to the point total after each score.
- Skipper: The world's largest game cannon, "Skipper" is present at every home game. It was built in 1963 by a group of cadets, led by Homer Hickam, author of the book, Rocket Boys. "Skipper" was created in an effort to silence the chant of: "Where's your cannon?" by the students of then arch-rival, VMI during the annual Thanksgiving Day game. The cannon was named "Skipper" to honor John F. Kennedy, who was assassinated at the same time the cannon was built. As the captain of a PT boat in WWII, JFK was commonly known as "Skipper". In 2015, a custom display space in the new cadet dormitory, Pearson Hall, became the permanent home for Skipper, presenting the cannon in a highly visible location for students, alumni, and visitors to admire when not in use.
- The Highty-Tighties: Virginia Tech's regimental band, the Highty-Tighties was founded in 1892 and is the oldest collegiate band in the Commonwealth of Virginia. It is composed completely of members of the Virginia Tech Corps of Cadets.
- Growley III: The Corps of Cadets officially welcomed a new canine ambassador among its ranks in the spring of 2022, a yellow Labrador Retriever, named "Growley III (call sign “Stryker”) who succeeded Growley II (call sign “Tank”). According to folklore, the name, "Growley" originated in the 1930s with the name of the commandant's dog. Cadets would regularly feed "Growley" with portions of their breakfast since food was scarce. Cadets then began referring to breakfast as "Growley", and the morning formation was typically announced as “minutes to Growley”. Today, "Growley III" resides at Pearson Hall West with his two cadet handlers and accompanies the Corps of Cadets to home football games.
- Growley IV: A new canine ambassador-in-training, a yellow Labrador Retriever using call sign "Bedford," was officially introduced in the fall of 2026. The call sign is in honor of the Bedford Boys, a group of 34 Virginia National Guard soldiers based in Bedford, Virginia who represented the greatest proportional losses of any American locality during D-Day.
- Homecoming Game Traditions:
  - Game Ball Run: Started in 1977, the Virginia Tech Army ROTC Ranger Company run the game ball for 100 miles (160 km) around campus, ending at the Homecoming Game Spirit Rally on Friday evening.
  - Flaming VT: Originating the mid-1960s, during the Homecoming Game Spirit Rally, the Corps of Cadets' Hotel Company lights a flaming VT with a torch. When it first began, cadets would thread rolls of toilet paper soaked in kerosene onto a metal VT shaped frame and run the flaming VT through campus, urging students to join the crowd.

=== Pre-game ===
- "Hokie Walk": A tradition where the team arrives in buses and walks to the locker room among the fans, and led by the Highty-Tighties and the Hokie Bird.
- Hokie Village: A game-day celebration near Lane Stadium that started in 2014. It's a family oriented, carnival atmosphere, featuring games, music, and appearances by cheerleaders, the Hokie Bird, and "Skipper".
- Pre-Game Field Show: At every home game, the Highty-Tighties perform the pre-game field show. At least once a year, the Marching Virginians perform their pre-game show, which begins with the band forming the shape of the Commonwealth of Virginia and features the MV's forming several recognizable shapes such as spelling out "VT," "HOKIES," and "TECH."
- Virginia Tech's Corps of Cadets march into Lane Stadium and stand in formation on the field during the National Anthem and Rendering of Colors."Skipper" is fired inside Lane Stadium in the south end zone at the completion of the anthem.
- Fireworks: Fireworks are set-off during and after the singing of the National anthem at night games.

=== Team entrance ===
- Prior to the team entrance, the cheerleaders start an alternating chant of "Let's Go" and "Hokies" with the east and west stands before the game along with the team walking from the locker room to the tunnel to the song "God's Gonna Cut You Down" By Johnny Cash.
- Enter Sandman: Beginning in 2000, Metallica's "Enter Sandman" is played as the football team enters the field through the tunnel behind the North end zone. As the music begins, The Marching Virginians lead the stadium in jumping in place, which has become known as the "Blacksburg Bounce".
- Hokie Stone: As the team runs out of the tunnel during Sandman, each player reaches up and touches a slab of Hokie Stone, then runs between two phalanxes, consisting of the Highty-Tighties, Marching Virginians, and freshman cadets. On the last home game of the season, senior cadets take the place of freshmen during the entrance as part of the corps of cadet's "Senior Day".

=== In-game ===
- Orange Effect: Since 2002, the students have designated one game where all fans are asked to wear orange. The Orange Effect game is always played against a team that does not use orange as a team color (e.g., Syracuse, Miami, UVA, or Clemson).
- Maroon Effect: Added in 2005, The Maroon Effect game is always played against a team that does not use maroon/crimson as a team color (includes regular opponents such as: Boston College or Florida State). The very first (unofficial) Maroon Effect game was in 2002 against the University of Virginia.
- White Effect: Added in 2008. The White Effect game is typically done for an early season game and coincide with the Military Appreciation game, usually against an FCS opponent, where all fans wear white.
- Marching Virginians: The Marching Virginians occupy the field level bleachers, in front of the student section behind the North end zone during the game, and play songs throughout.
- Turkey Gobble: A turkey gobble sound is periodically played over the PA system to rile up the crowd during lulls, most commonly on opponent's third down plays. The turkey gobble is in memory of Floyd H. "Hard Times" Meade, a local boy who was adopted by the corps and became the school's first "mascot" in the late 19th century. Floyd later brought live trained turkeys to games to walk the sidelines during games and gobble on command.
- Key Play: A tradition started in the late 1980s: Virginia Tech fans shake their keys as a distraction during opponent's third down plays, signifying a "key play".
- Growley III: Since the beginning of the 2020 season, the Corps of Cadets' canine ambassador, Growley III ('Stryker'), can be seen along the sidelines, in front of the cadet seating section, often chewing on a doll of the opposing team's mascot.
- Halftime Field Show: The Marching Virginians perform the half-time field show at every game. At every field show, the band usually performs up to three songs followed by "Tech Triumph" as they march off the field. The Highty-Tighties perform the halftime show at least once a year.
- Hokie Pokie: The tuba section of The Marching Virginians lines up on the goal line of the north end zone to play and dance the Hokie Pokie ("Hokey Pokey"). This is performed during halftime at select games during the season. Prior to 2017, the "Hokie Pokie" was performed between the 3rd and 4th quarters of every home game.

==== Scoring plays ====
- Student Toss: Groups of students, most of whom are seated in the student section in the north end zone, lift up a student (usually female) to toss in the air for every point scored.
- Bench Press: The school mascot, the Hokie Bird does one bench press for every point the Hokies score on a weight bench in the end zone.
- Push-Ups: Freshman cadets complete push-ups on the shoulders of their cadets seated in front of them, completing one push-up for every point scored by the Hokies.
- Flags: Following every touchdown, members of the cheer squad run onto the field carrying six large flags, each with a single letter, spelling: "H-O-K-I-E-S"
- Tech Triumph: After a scoring play, the Marching Virginians will play the fight song, Tech Triumph. During a touchdown, the band will reduce their sound while the team attempts the extra point, returning to normal following the kick.
- Skipper: During the game, Skipper, the cannon is fired behind the north end zone stands of Lane Stadium after every score by Virginia Tech.
- Fireworks: Fireworks are set-off on scoring plays at night games.

== See also ==
- Virginia Tech
- Virginia Tech campus
- Virginia Tech Hokies
- List of NCAA Division I FBS football stadiums
- List of American football stadiums by capacity
- Lists of stadiums
