= Virginia Tech Hokies =

Intercollegiate sports teams of Virginia Tech

- University: Virginia Polytechnic Institute and State University
- Nickname: Hokies
- NCAA: Division I (FBS)
- Conference: Atlantic Coast Conference
- Athletic director: Brian White
- Location: Blacksburg, Virginia
- Varsity teams: 22
- Football stadium: Lane Stadium/Worsham Field
- Basketball arena: Cassell Coliseum
- Baseball stadium: English Field
- Soccer stadium: Thompson Field
- Colors: Chicago maroon and burnt orange
- Mascot: Hokie Bird
- Fight song: Tech Triumph
- Website: hokiesports.com

The Virginia Tech Hokies are the athletic teams representing Virginia Tech in intercollegiate athletics. The Hokies participate in the NCAA's Division I Atlantic Coast Conference in 22 varsity sports. Virginia Tech's men's sports are football, basketball, baseball, cross country, golf, soccer, swimming and diving, tennis, indoor and outdoor track and field, and wrestling. Virginia Tech's women's sports are basketball, cross country, lacrosse, soccer, softball, swimming and diving, tennis, indoor and outdoor track and field, golf, and volleyball.

Atlantic Coast Conference logo in Virginia Tech's colors

Virginia Tech's athletes have won 22 individual national titles in various track and field events, wrestling, and swimming. Though not affiliated with the NCAA, Virginia Tech won the 2007 national championship of bass fishing. The Hokie men's basketball team won the 1973 and 1995 NIT tournaments and went to the Sweet Sixteen of NCAA tournament in 1967 and 2019. The Hokies football team lost to Florida State in the 2000 Sugar Bowl (BCS National Championship Game) and finished the 1999 season with a No. 2 ranking in the BCS Poll. Virginia Tech is one of only three "Power Five" conference members who have never won an NCAA team national championship, the others being Kansas State and UCF.

== Name origins and history ==
Virginia Tech's sports teams are called the "Hokies". The word "Hokie" originated in the "Old Hokie" spirit yell created in 1896 by O. M. Stull for a contest to select a new spirit yell when the college's name was changed from Virginia Agricultural and Mechanical College (VAMC) to Virginia Agricultural and Mechanical College and Polytechnic Institute (VPI) and the original spirit yell, which referred to the old name, was no longer usable. Stull won, and received a $5 award.

Hoki, Hoki, Hoki, Hy.
Techs, Techs, VPI!
Sola-Rex, Sola-Rah.
Polytechs—Vir-gin-ia.
Rae, Ri, V.P.I

Later, the phrase "Team! Team! Team!" was added at the end, and an "e" was added to "Hoki".

Stull later said that he made up the word as an attention-grabber. Though he may not have known it, "Hokie" (in its various forms) has been around at least since 1842. According to Johann Norstedt, now a retired Virginia Tech English professor, "[Hokie was] a word that people used to express feeling, approval, excitement, surprise. Hokie, then, is a word like 'hooray' or 'yeah', or 'rah'." Whatever its original meaning, the word in the popular cheer did, as Stull wanted, grab attention and has been a part of Virginia Tech tradition ever since.

The official university school colors—Chicago Maroon and Burnt Orange—also were introduced in 1896. The colors were chosen by a committee because they made a "unique combination" not worn elsewhere at the time.

The team mascot is the HokieBird, a turkey-like creature. The teams were originally known as the "Fighting Gobblers" and the turkey motif was retained despite the name change.

== Traditions ==
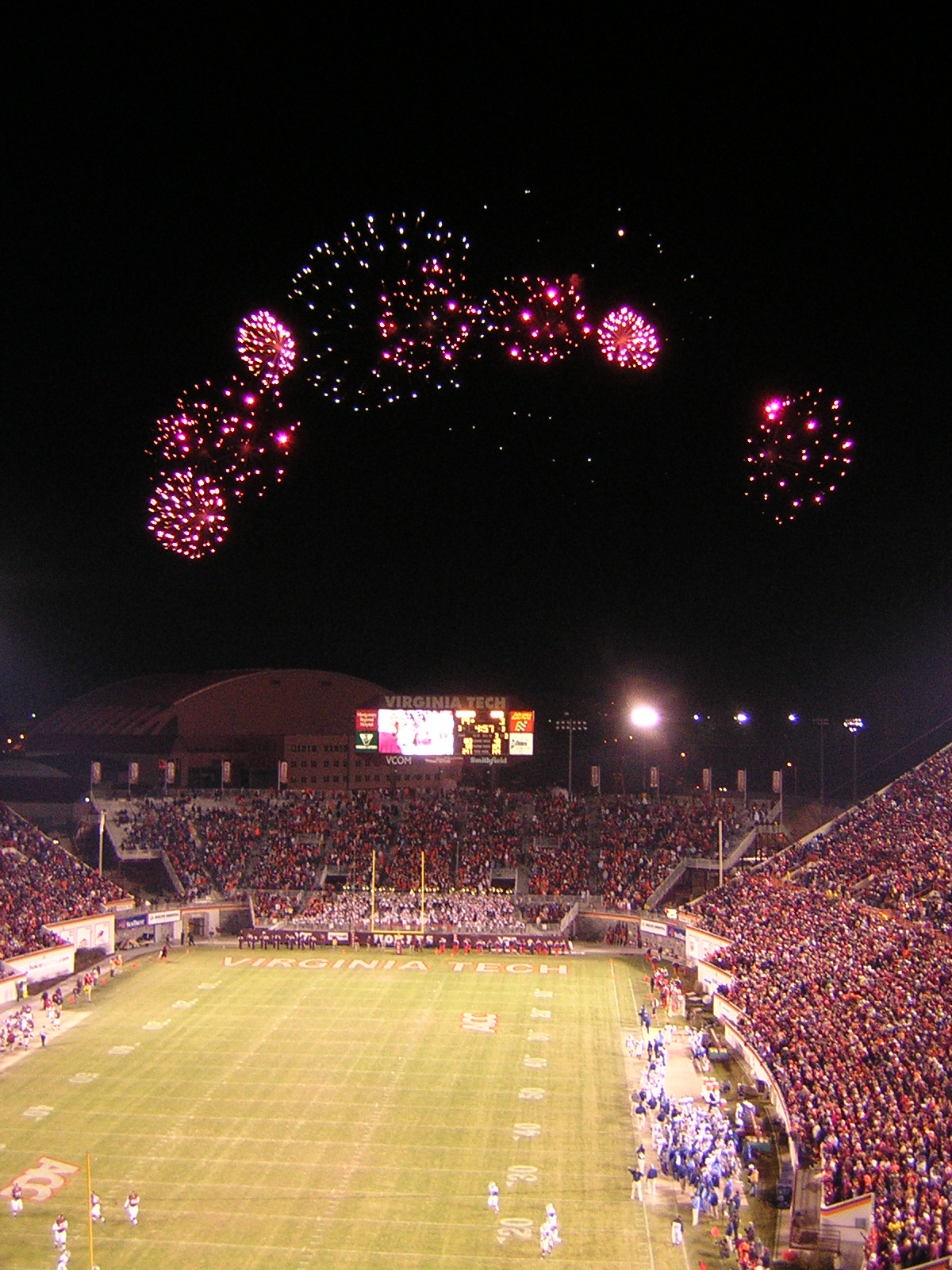
Fireworks over Lane Stadium

The stylized VT (the abbreviation for Virginia Tech) is used primarily by the athletic department as a symbol for Virginia Tech athletic teams. The "athletic VT" symbol is trademarked by the university and appears frequently on licensed merchandise.

During the early years of the university, a rivalry developed between the Virginia Military Institute and Virginia Tech, then called VPI. This rivalry developed into the original "Military Classic of the South," which was an annual football game between VMI and VPI on Thanksgiving Day in Roanoke, Virginia. This rivalry continued until 1970 when Tech's football program became too large and too competitive for VMI. Today, Tech's major athletic rivalries include the Virginia Cavaliers (see Virginia-Virginia Tech rivalry), the West Virginia Mountaineers, and the Miami Hurricanes.

Virginia Tech's fight song, Tech Triumph, was written in 1919 and remains in use today. Tech Triumph is played at sporting events by both the Virginia Tech band, The Marching Virginians, and the Corps of Cadets' band, the Highty Tighties. The Old Hokie spirit yell, in use since 1896, is familiar to all Tech fans.

Many of Tech's more modern traditions were adopted after the construction of Lane Stadium in 1964. Virginia Tech's football traditions and the school's fans are the subject of a 2007 full-length documentary called Hokie Nation which features a mix of interviews with coaches, players and fans as well as a look at Hokie football history and the direction of the program.

== Conference affiliation ==
Years	Association / conference
1895–1906	Virginia Intercollegiate Athletic Association
1907–1921	South Atlantic Intercollegiate Athletic Association
1921–1965	Southern Conference
1965–1978	Independent
1978–1995	Metro Conference (except football)
1991–1998	Colonial Athletic Association (wrestling only)
1991–2000	Big East Conference (football only, joined for other sports in 2000)
1995–2000	Atlantic 10 Conference (except football and wrestling)
1998–2004	Eastern Wrestling League (wrestling only)
2000–2004	Big East Conference (except wrestling)
2004–present	Atlantic Coast Conference

Tech teams participate in the Atlantic Coast Conference (ACC), which the school joined in 2003 after a tumultuous trek through five different conferences in the previous decade, most recently leaving the Big East in the controversial ACC expansion.

In 1921, Virginia Tech joined the Southern Intercollegiate Conference (now Southern Conference), which contained 19 schools by 1922, all current members of the ACC or Southeastern Conference (SEC). In 1932, thirteen schools left the then-gigantic Southern Conference to form the SEC and in 1953, seven more teams left to form the ACC. UVA, which had left the Southern Conference in the mid-1930s, was added to the original seven before the 1953–54 basketball season. Tech was passed over for membership in December of that year, despite a proposal by North Carolina to add the Gobblers and West Virginia Mountaineers. In 1965, Tech left the Southern Conference to become independent. Tech applied for membership in the ACC again in 1977, but was turned down for membership despite support from UVA, Duke, and Clemson.

In 1978, Virginia Tech joined the Metro Conference, winning the conference men's basketball championship tournament and automatic NCAA berth in its first year.

In 1991, Virginia Tech was invited to join the Big East Conference for football only. Members of the Big East football conference included Boston College, Miami, Pittsburgh, Rutgers, Syracuse, Temple, Virginia Tech, and West Virginia. In 1994, Virginia Tech was turned down for full membership in the Big East.

In January 1995, Virginia Tech and Virginia Commonwealth University were ousted from the Metro Conference and subsequently filed a lawsuit against the conference. The lawsuit was settled when Metro agreed to pay the Hokies $1,135,000 and Virginia Tech joined the Atlantic 10 Conference, along with fellow newcomers Dayton and LaSalle in June 1995.

In 1999, the Big East agreed to accept Virginia Tech as a full member in all sports. Virginia Tech ultimately paid $8.3 million to join the conference, $1.1 million of which was actually paid after the school left.

In April 2003, Mike Tranghese, commissioner of the Big East, dropped a bombshell – that the ACC was secretly trying to lure away Big East members. Over the next several months, the ACC held meetings and discussions. Ultimately, Virginia Tech was invited to join the conference, along with Miami. Boston College was added the following year. Virginia Tech finally had achieved what Frank Moseley had sought so long ago – membership in the ACC.

When Virginia Tech was invited to join the ACC, former Roanoke Times sports editor Bill Brill expressed his displeasure, saying "Virginia Tech will not win an ACC championship in my lifetime." When Virginia Tech's football team proceeded to do precisely that in their very first season in the league, Brill's house in Chapel Hill, North Carolina received hundreds of mocking phone calls from angry Virginia Tech fans, curious to learn when the funeral arrangements would be held..

== Sports sponsored ==
Men's sports	Women's sports
Baseball	Basketball
Basketball	Cross country
Cross country	Golf
Football	Lacrosse
Golf	Soccer
Soccer	Softball
Swimming and diving	Swimming and diving
Tennis	Tennis
Track and field	Track and field
Wrestling	Volleyball

=== Football ===
Virginia Tech's football team plays home games in Lane Stadium. With a capacity of 66,233, Lane is relatively small in comparison to many other top FBS stadiums, yet it is still considered to be one of the loudest stadiums in the country. In 2005, it was recognized by rivals.com as having the best home-field advantage in college football.

Since the 1995 season, the Hokies have finished with a top-10 ranking five times, won seven conference championships (three Big East and four ACC), and played once for the national championship, losing to Florida State 46–29 in the 2000 Sugar Bowl. Annually, Virginia Tech plays its traditional rival, the University of Virginia, for the Commonwealth Cup, a series which Virginia Tech leads 59–38–5.

Frank Beamer was the Hokies' head coach from 1987 to 2015, and was the winningest active head coach in FBS football with 280 wins following the 2015 season. Coach Beamer ended his tenure as head coach with a win in the Independence Bowl in Shreveport, LA, where the Bowl streak began in 1993. Beamer's teams were known for solid Special Teams play (called "Beamer Ball") and for tough defenses headed by defensive coordinator Bud Foster. In 2018, Beamer was selected to join the 2018 College Football Hall of Fame.

On November 29, 2015, Virginia Tech Director of Athletics Whit Babcock announced that Justin Fuente was hired from the University of Memphis to succeed the retiring Frank Beamer. In Fuente's first season, Virginia Tech won the ACC Coastal Division and he was named the ACC Coach of the Year. While Fuente's first two seasons with the Hokies were strong, declining performance led him to be fired in 2021 following consecutive losses to Syracuse, Pittsburgh, and Notre Dame. He was succeeded by Brent Pry, a former Beamer assistant who was the defensive coordinator at Penn State. A lack of competitive success led the Hokies to break their 29-year bowl game streak. They would return to bowl eligibility in 2023 and 2024. Pry was fired in 2025 following losses to Vanderbilt, South Carolina, and Old Dominion.

Amid a $230 million increase to the athletics budget, Director of Athletics Whit Babcock announced the hiring of James Franklin, the former head coach of Penn State, to be the next head coach. He rehired Brent Pry as defensive coordinator, reuniting the two for the first time since 2021. Franklin immediately improved recruiting, with the 2026 class currently being ranked 11th nationally and 2nd in the ACC.

=== Men's basketball ===
Virginia Tech's men's basketball team plays home games in Cassell Coliseum. They have enjoyed moderate success in the postseason, making the NCAA Tournament 11 times.

Virginia Tech's men's basketball team saw a resurgence of fan support since the arrival of coach Seth Greenberg in 2003–04 and the university's entry into the ACC in 2004–05. Prior to Coach Greenberg's arrival in Blacksburg, the men's basketball team had not had a winning season since the 1995–96 season, when they received a bid to the NCAA tournament.

In 2003–04, Greenberg's squad made the Big East tournament. A year later, in their first season in the ACC, the Hokies scored their first postseason berth in nine years when they made the NIT in 2004–05. In the 2006–07 season, Greenberg's Hokies finished with a 10–6 record in the ACC and a 22–12 record overall, earning their first NCAA tournament berth in 11 years, reaching the NCAA second round before losing to Southern Illinois.

In March 2014, Virginia Tech Director of Athletics Whit Babcock announced the hiring of Buzz Williams as the Hokies' new head men's basketball coach. Williams spent the previous six seasons as the head coach at Marquette University, where he compiled a 139–69 record and led the Golden Eagles to five NCAA appearances and a Big East Conference regular season title. During Williams's tenure, Marquette tallied a 69–39 record in the Big East Conference, and six Marquette players made it to the NBA.

In the Buzz Williams era, Virginia Tech made NCAA Men's Tournament appearances in the 2017, 2018, and 2019 seasons, making it the first time in school history that Virginia Tech has made the NCAA Men's Tournament three years in a row. In the 2019 NCAA Tournament, Virginia Tech advanced to the Sweet Sixteen for the first time since 1967.

In April 2019, Whit Babcock announced the hiring of Mike Young after Buzz Williams left to become the head coach at Texas A&M. On March 12, 2022, Young led the Hokies to the ACC Tournament title for the first time in school history. The tournament final was played against Mike Krzyzewski's Duke Blue Devils in Coach K's final ACC tournament game. Tech, the seven seed, won 82–67 and only reached the final after beating Clemson, Notre Dame, and North Carolina in consecutive nights. The Hokies were the first seven seed to win the tournament in its long history.

=== Women's basketball ===
Virginia Tech's women's basketball competes in the Atlantic Coast Conference (ACC). Like the men's team, they play their home games in Cassell Coliseum.

The program's most recent head coach was Kenny Brooks. Brooks helped guide the program to its first in many categories, including Women's Final Four (2023), ACC Tournament championship (2023), ACC regular-season title (2024), and 30-win season (2023).

Under former coaches Beth Dunkenberger and Bonnie Henrickson, the program was a fixture in postseason play. The Hokies have received nine berths to the NCAA tournament since the program's first in 1994. Virginia Tech's women have also earned five NIT appearances during that stretch including back-to-back appearances in 2016 and 2017.

=== Soccer ===
Women's soccer at Virginia Tech began in 1980 with two club teams under the guidance of Everett Germain and his two daughters, Betsy and Julie. Kelly Cagle was head coach from 2002 to 2010, leaving with a record of 76–70–15 and three consecutive NCAA trips. She was succeeded by Charles "Chugger" Adair. Under Adair the Hokie Women's Soccer quad has spent numerous weeks ranked in the top 25 during their 2012 campaign. During the 2013 season Virginia Tech ranked in the top 5 making it to the Final Four for the first time in school history. The women's team has now been to 6 straight NCAA tournaments 2008–2013 having two Sweet Sixteen finishes and one Final Four finish.

Virginia Tech's men's soccer team has improved greatly since the arrival of Oliver Weiss, who has coached the team since 2000. Under Weiss, Tech has made four NCAA tournament appearances, including a trip to the College Cup in 2007. The Hokies' trip to the College Cup is the equivalent of men's basketball Final Four and was the soccer team's most successful season. The Hokies finished the 2007 regular season ranked third nationally.

=== Baseball ===
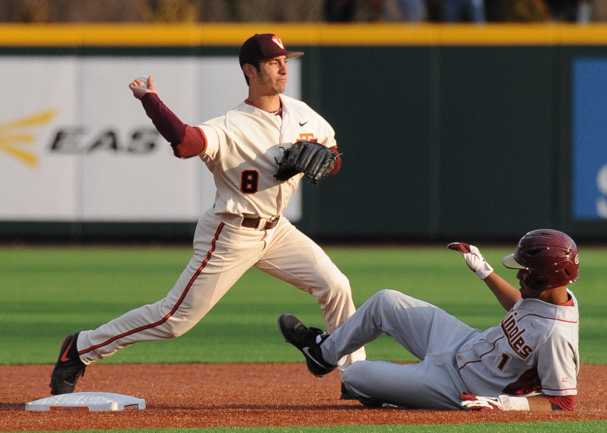
A Virginia Tech infielder turns a double play against Florida State in 2013.

Chuck Hartman, who retired as the Virginia Tech baseball coach in 2006, finished his career as the fourth winningest coach in Division I baseball history with a 1,444–816–8 record, including a 961–591–18 mark in his 28 seasons at Tech, the best record of any baseball coach in history at Tech.

The team is currently coached by John Szefc.

=== Softball ===
Since starting its varsity program in 1996, the Virginia Tech softball team has played in six conference championship games, winning both the ACC regular season and tournament titles in 2007. Under head coach Scot Thomas and behind the strength of one of the nation's best college pitchers, senior All-American Angela Tincher, the Hokies made their fourth consecutive NCAA tournament appearance in 2008. On May 25, 2008, they defeated the fourth-seeded Michigan Wolverines to advance to their first College World Series, though the Hokies were held scoreless during that appearance and were quickly eliminated in two games. Virginia Tech Softball upset the USA national team in a 1–0 no hitter in 2008 and advanced to the Women's College World Series for the first time ever. Scot Thomas helped start the program in 1996 and celebrated his 600th win during the 2012 season. He was fired following the conclusion of the 2018 season after two consecutive losing seasons.

Since joining the ACC, the Virginia Tech Softball team has won two Conference Titles in 2007 and 2008. On May 31, 2018, Pete D'Amour was announced as the new head coach of the Virginia Tech softball program.

=== Golf ===
The men's golf team has won 12 conference championships:

- Southern Conference (4): 1956, 1961, 1963, 1965
- Metro Conference (2): 1993, 1994
- Atlantic 10 Conference (2): 1996, 1997
- Big East Conference (3): 2001, 2002, 2003
- Atlantic Coast Conference (1): 2007 (co-champions)

In 2007, Virginia Tech golfer Drew Weaver became the first American to win the British Amateur golf tournament since 1979. Weaver edged out 2006 Australian Amateur champion Tim Stewart and earned an invitation to the 2007 Open Championship.

Former Hokies that have won at the professional level include: Johnson Wagner (three PGA Tour wins), Adam Hunter (one European Tour win), and Brendon de Jonge (one Nationwide Tour win).

=== Wrestling ===
The Virginia Tech Wrestling program was founded in 1920. The team holds its matches at Cassell Coliseum and practices in the training room on the third floor of the football locker room facility, renovated in 2010.

In 2006, Kevin Dresser was named the head coach of the wrestling program. The team won the 2014 ACC Tournament, led by captain Devin Carter, who was named Tournament MVP. The Hokies finished 8th overall in team standings at the 2014 NCAA Championships. Devin Carter was the runner-up at 141 lbs and Virginia Tech's first ever NCAA Tournament finalist.

During the 2014–15 season, a few select matches were held for the first time at the Moss Performing Arts Center on the Virginia Tech campus.

The Hokie Wrestling team won the 2015–16 regular season ACC dual meet title, after beating previously undefeated North Carolina State University in the last conference dual meet of the season. The team took second place at the 2016 ACC Tournament. The 2015–16 team also set program bests with six All-Americans and a fourth-place finish at the 2016 NCAA Division I Wrestling Championships, which is also ties the 2017–2018 NC State Wolfpack for the highest finish for an ACC team ever. Kevin Dresser was named the 2016 NWCA Coach of the Year at the tournament.

In 2017, Tony Robie became the wrestling program's head coach, following Kevin Dresser's departure to Iowa State.

In 2019, redshirt freshman Mekhi Lewis became the first Hokie wrestler to win a national championship for Virginia Tech. Before his 7–1 victory over two-time defending national champion Vincenzo Joseph of Penn State in the 165-pound finals, Lewis dispatched the number one seed Alex Marinelli of Iowa in the quarterfinals and the number four seed Evan Wick of Wisconsin in the semi-finals. For his remarkable three-day performance, Lewis was named Most Outstanding Wrestler of the tournament.

In 2024, true sophomore Caleb Henson defeated 6th seed Austin Gomez of Michigan in the finals by a 15–7 major decision in the 149-pound weight division to become Virginia Tech's 2nd ever wrestling national champion. Henson beat 5th seed Ty Watters 8–3 in the quarter finals and number 1 seed Ridge Lovett 1–0 in the semi-finals to reach the championship match against Gomez.

ACC Wrestling dual-meet championships
#	Year	Conf.	Overall	Head coach
1	2012–13	(5–0)	(16–3–8)	Kevin Dresser
2	2013–14	(4–2)	(8–5–9)	Kevin Dresser
3	2015–16	(5–0)	(16–2–8)	Kevin Dresser
4	2017–18	(4–1)	(14–3)	Tony Robie
5	2020–21	(4–0)	(8–0)	Tony Robie
6	2024–25	(5–1)	(9–2)	Tony Robie

== Non-varsity sports ==
=== Ice hockey ===
Virginia Tech ice hockey was formed in 1984. They joined the newly formed ACCHL in 1995 and have competed there ever since. The team won the regular season champion title during the 1996–97 season with a record of 13–1. The Hokies play out of the Berglund Center in Roanoke and drew the biggest crowd in team history of 5,200+ to the VT vs. UVA game on January 19, 2007. They became the first non-Carolina team to win the Canes Cup on January 14, 2007 by defeating the Duke University Blue Devils, NC State University Wolfpack and the East Carolina University Pirates. During the 2010–11 season, the Hokies turned towards a more competitive conference, the Mid-Atlantic Collegiate Hockey Association (MACHA), where they play in the same division against Liberty, East Carolina, Maryland, and UMBC. In the 2011–12 season, the Hokies earned a berth in the ACHA Division II National Tournament for the first time in program history, finishing 12th in the nation. The Hokies captured their first MACH championship in 2013 by defeating (3) Liberty, (2) UMBC, and (1) Penn State in succession.

=== Rugby ===
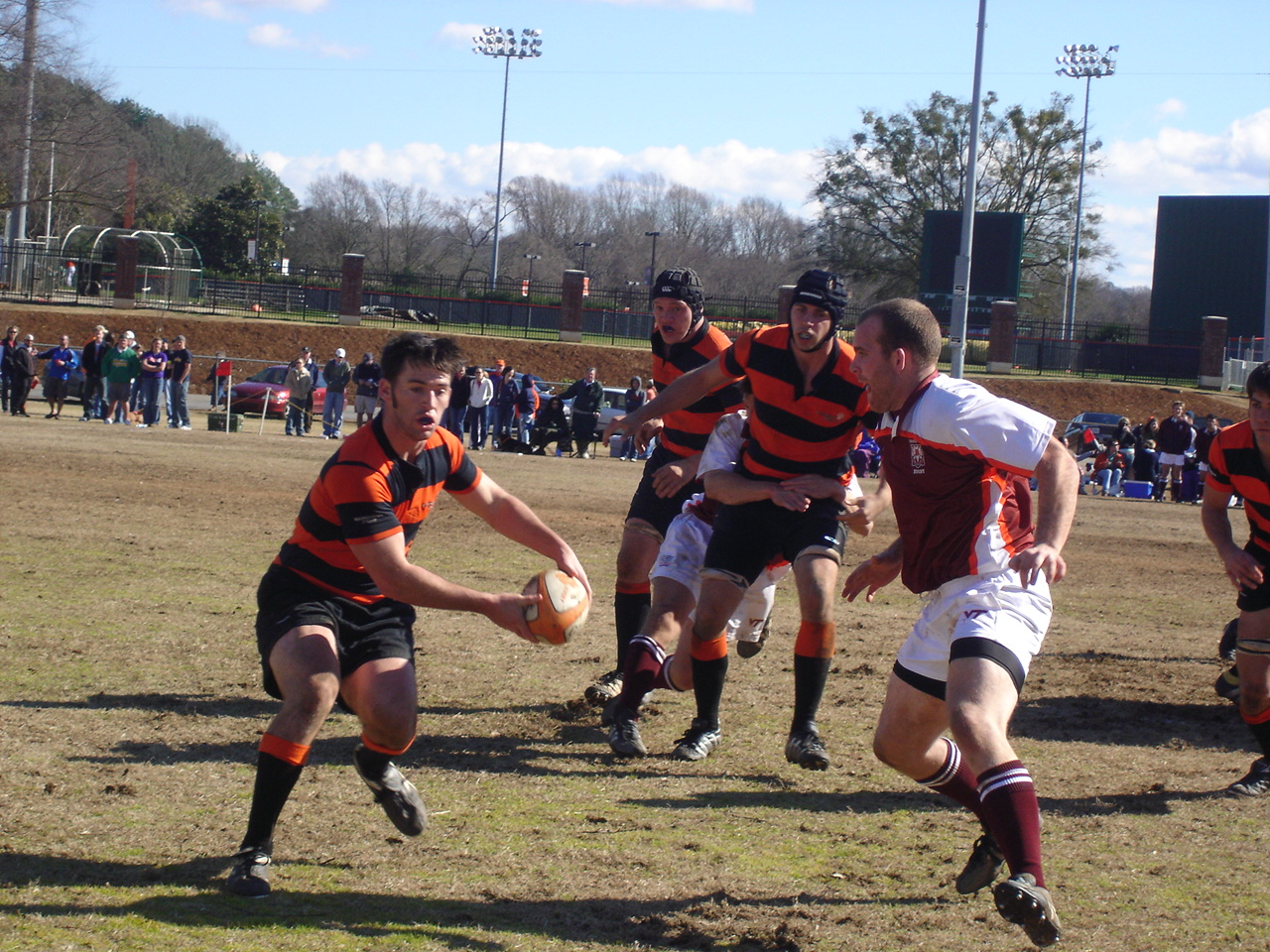
Virginia Tech at Clemson rugby match in 2006

The Virginia Tech rugby team was founded in 1968, although the first recorded college rugby match in Blacksburg dates back to 1891. Virginia Tech rugby plays in the Big East conference against its traditional ACC rivals. Tech rugby plays an annual rivalry match against University of Virginia for the Commonwealth Shield. The Hokies are supported by the Tech Rugby Alumni Association, which has established an endowment managed by the Virginia Tech Foundation that provides for limited scholarships for rugby players.

The Hokies have been successful in rugby sevens. The Hokies finished third in their conference in spring 2012. The Hokies won the college division of the July 2012 Cape Fear 7s tournament. The Hokies also defeated other ACC teams to win the 2012 Virginia Tech 7s, beating NC State 22–5 in the final. In 2012, the Hokies defeated Virginia 33–31 to win the Atlantic Coast Rugby League 7s, automatically qualifying for the 2012 USA Rugby Sevens Collegiate National Championships. Winning the 2012 ARRL 7s also qualified the Hokies for the 2013 Collegiate Rugby Championship, the highest profile competition in college rugby, broadcast live on NBC from PPL Park in Philadelphia.

The Hokies claimed the 2021 D1-AA National Championship with a dominant tournament run featuring wins over Salisbury (91–0), Boise State (27–11), and West Chester (37–15). The following year, they repeated as champions, defeating the Louisville Cardinals in the 2022 D1-AA Championship Final (24–22).

=== Bass fishing ===
The Virginia Tech College bass team was founded in the 2006–2007 school year, and won their first national title that same year.

=== Field hockey ===
The Virginia Tech Club field hockey team was founded as a replacement of the D1 team in the 1990s. The team competes in the club-level National Field Hockey League, and won the league's championship in fall 2017.

== Facilities ==
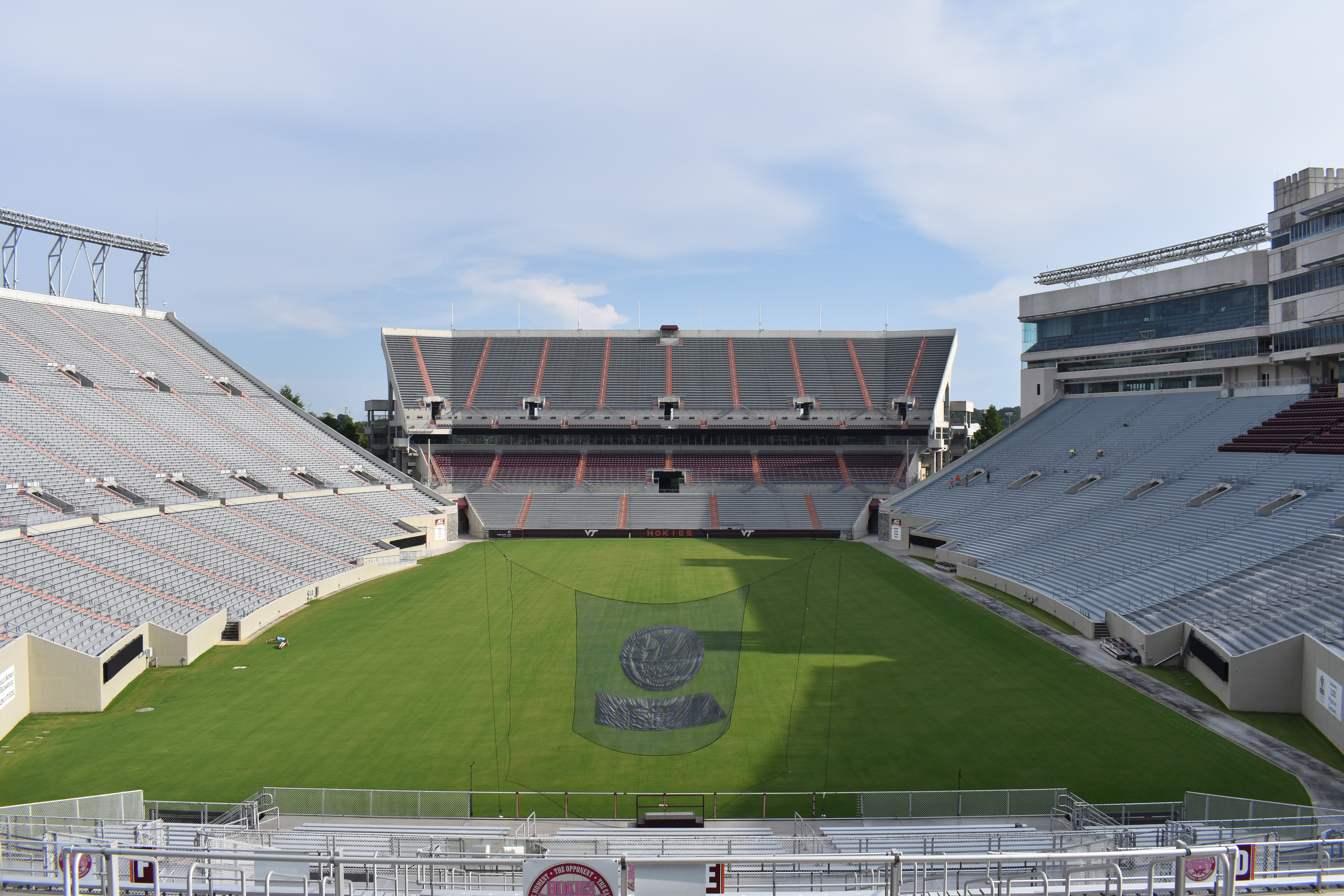
Lane Stadium

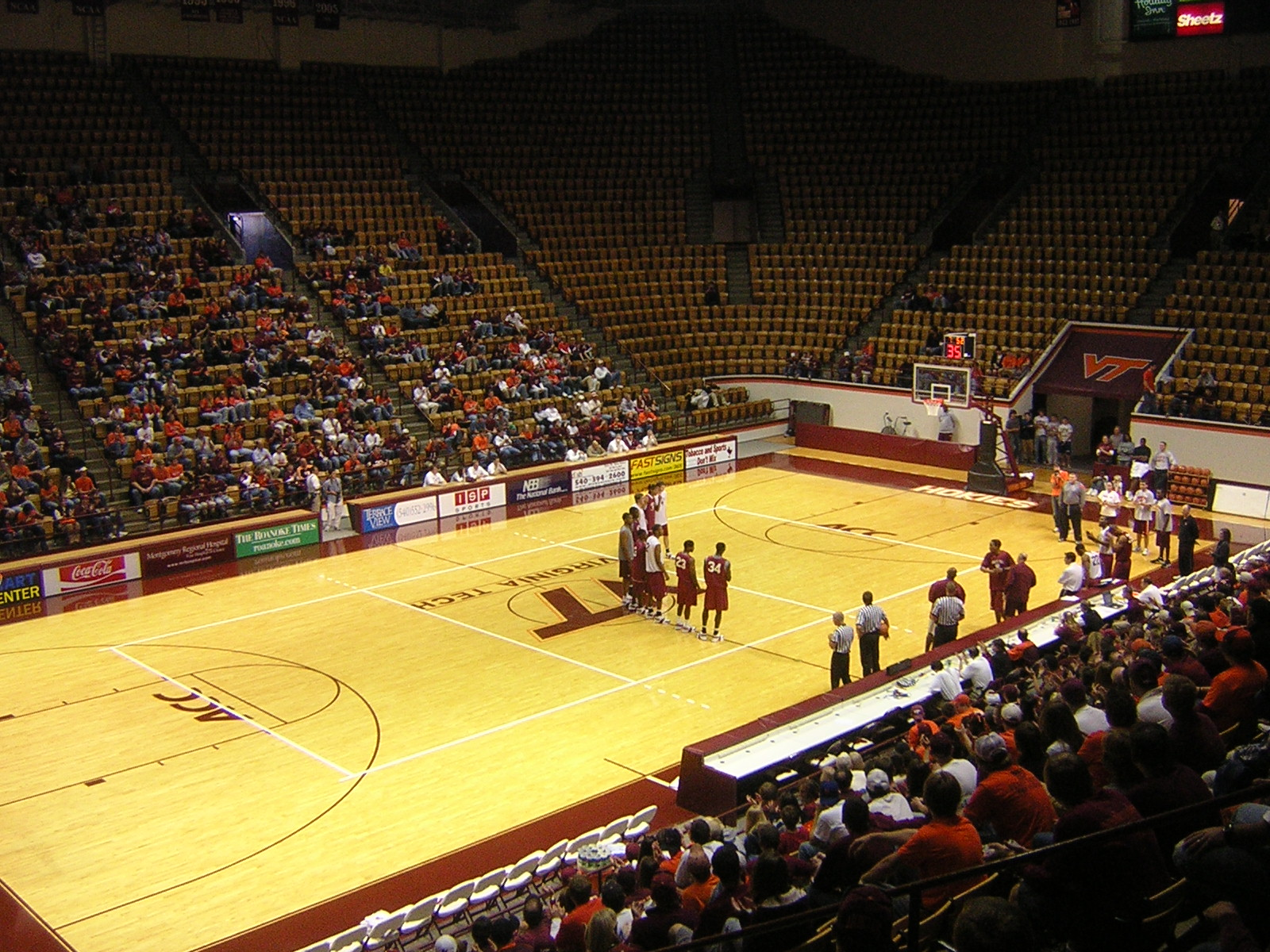
Cassell Coliseum

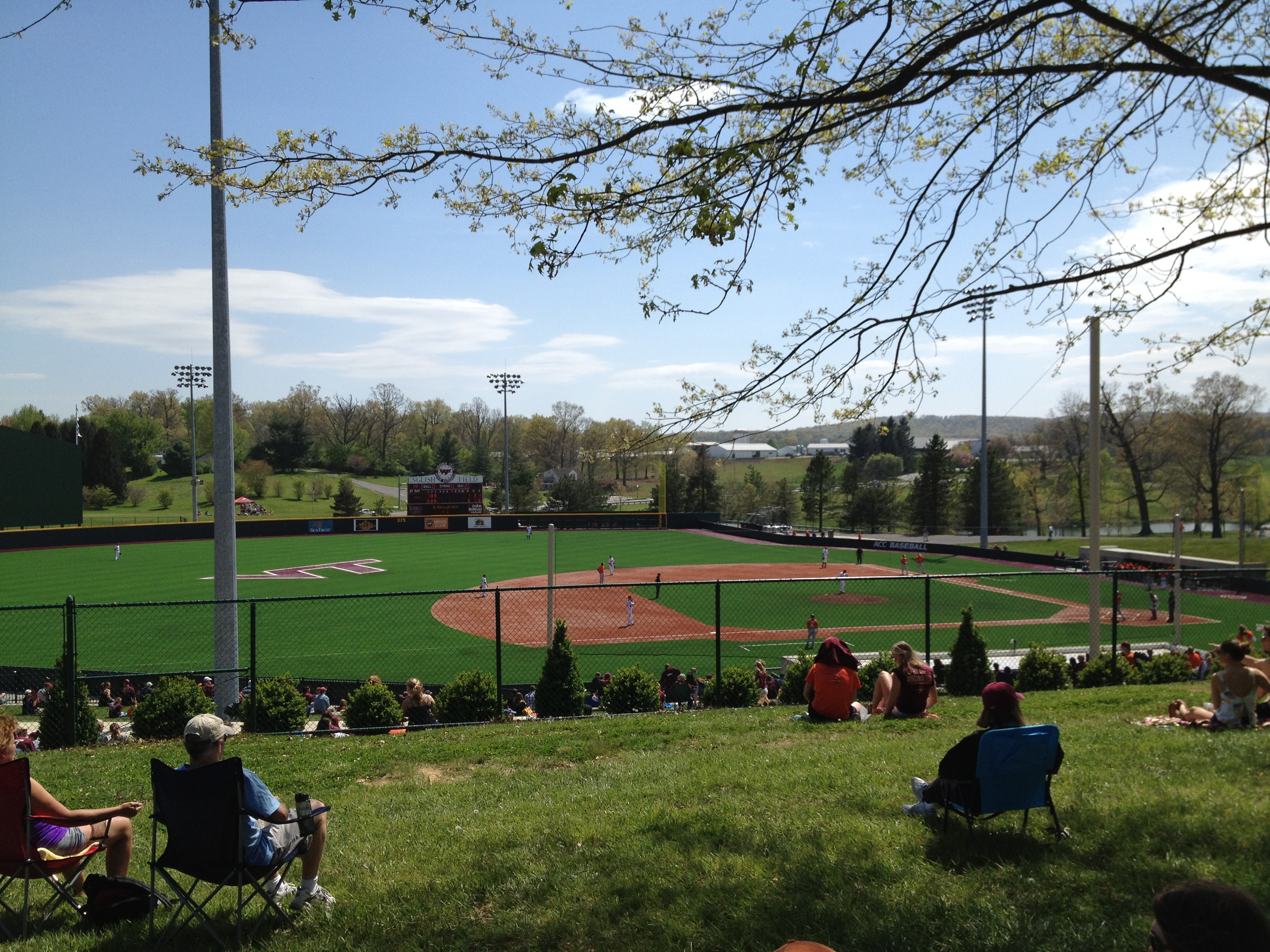
English Field

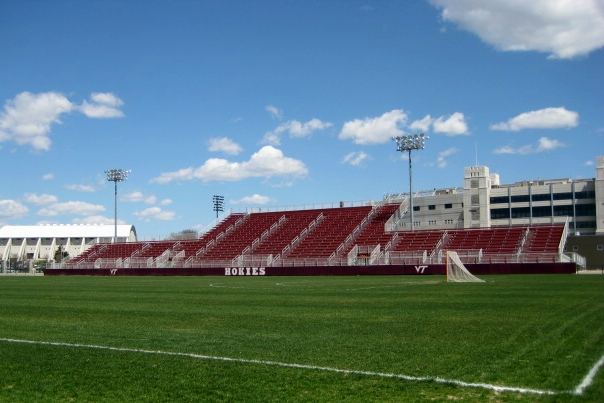
Thompson Field

Venue	Sport(s)	Open.	Capac.	Ref.
Lane Stadium	Football	1965	65,632	
Cassell Coliseum	Basketball	1962	8,925	
English Field	Baseball	1989	1,132	
Thompson Field	Soccer; Lacrosse	2003	2,500	
Tech Softball Park	Softball	1997	1,024	
Burrows-Burleson Center	Tennis	1992	n/a	
Christiansburg Aquatic Center	Swimming	2010	n/a	
Johnson/Miller Track Complex	Track and field (outdoor)	1997	n/a	
Rector Field House	Track and field (indoor)	1971	n/a	

== Championships ==
Virginia Tech, along with Kansas State and UCF, is one of only three Power Four conference schools that have not won an NCAA-recognized national championship in any varsity team sport. (Note: UCF claims a 2017 football championship awarded it by Colley Matrix. However, this championship is not widely recognized and was not bestowed by the NCAA.) The Hokies listed below have won individual national championships.

- Swimming (1)
  - Youssef Ramadan – 100-yard butterfly, 2023
- Wrestling (2)
  - Mekhi Lewis – 165-pound weight class, 2019
  - Caleb Henson – 149-pound weight class, 2024
- Men's track & field (11)
  - Spyridon Jullien – weight throw, 2005
  - Spyridon Jullien – hammer throw, 2005
  - Spyridon Jullien – weight throw, 2006
  - Spyridon Jullien – hammer throw, 2006
  - Marcel Lomnicky – hammer throw, 2009
  - Alexander Ziegler – hammer throw, 2011
  - Marcel Lomnicky – weight throw, 2012
  - Alexander Ziegler – hammer throw, 2012
  - Alexander Ziegler – weight throw, 2013
  - Tomas Kruzliak – hammer throw, 2013
  - Vincent Ciattei, Greg Chiles, Patrick Joseph, Neil Gourley – men's DMR, 2018
- Women's track & field (8)
  - Queen Harrison – 60m hurdles, 2010
  - Queen Harrison – 400m hurdles, 2010
  - Queen Harrison – 100m hurdles, 2010
  - Dorotea Habazin – hammer throw, 2011
  - Irena Sediva – javelin, 2015
  - Irena Sediva – javelin, 2017
  - Rachel Baxter – pole vault, 2022
  - Lindsey Butler – 800m, 2022
  - Julia Fixsen – Pole Vault, 2023

=== Non-varsity championships ===
- Women's club soccer – 1997
- Bass fishing – 2007
- Women's gymnastics (NAIGC Level 8) – 2015
- Field hockey – 2017
- Club baseball – 2021
- Rugby – 2021, 2022
- Men's club track and field – 2022, 2023
- Drone Racing – 2025
- Jump Rope – 2025
- Spikeball – 2025

== Radio network affiliates ==
City	Call sign	Frequency
Abingdon, Virginia	WFHG-FM	92.7 FM
Blacksburg, Virginia	WBRW	105.3 FM
Blackstone, Virginia	WBBC-FM	93.5 FM
Bluefield, West Virginia	WKEZ	1240 AM
Bluefield, West Virginia	WKOY-FM	100.9 FM
Bristol, Virginia	WWTB	980 AM
Charlottesville, Virginia	WKAV	1400 AM
Clintwood, Virginia	WDIC-FM	92.1 FM
Danville, Virginia	WMNA-FM	106.3 FM
Galax, Virginia	WCGX	1360 AM
Gate City, Virginia	WGAT	1050 AM
Harrisonburg, Virginia	WSIG	96.9 FM
Iron Gate, Virginia	WJVR	101.9 FM
Jacksonville, North Carolina	WAVQ	1400 AM
Lebanon, Virginia	WLRV	1380 AM
Luray, Virginia	WMXH-FM	105.7 FM
Lynchburg, Virginia	WLNI	105.9 FM
Marion, Virginia	WOLD-FM	102.5 FM
Morningside, Maryland	WJFK	1580 AM
New Bern, North Carolina	WWNB	1490 AM
Norfolk, Virginia	WNIS	790 AM
Onley, Virginia	WESR	1330 AM
Onley, Virginia	WESR-FM	103.3 FM
Richmond, Virginia	WRNL	910 AM
Richmond, Virginia	WRVA	1140 AM
Roanoke, Virginia	WJJS	93.5 FM
Staunton, Virginia	WTON	1240 AM
Tazewell, Virginia	WKQY	100.1 FM
Warsaw, Virginia	WNNT-FM	107.5 FM
Washington, D.C.	WJFK-FM	106.7 FM
White Stone, Virginia	WIGO-FM	104.9 FM
Winchester, Virginia	WINC	1400 AM
Wytheville, Virginia	WXBX	95.3 FM

== See also ==
- List of Old Hokies (alumni)
