= Laprise =

Laprise or LaPrise is a French-language surname. It is not found in France.

Notable people with the surname include:

- Chad Laprise (born 1986), Canadian mixed martial artist
- Gérard Laprise (1925–2000), Canadian politician
- Larry LaPrise (1912–1996), American songwriter and musician
- Normand Laprise (born 1961), French Canadian chef and author
