= The Marching Virginians =

Non-military college marching band at Virginia Tech

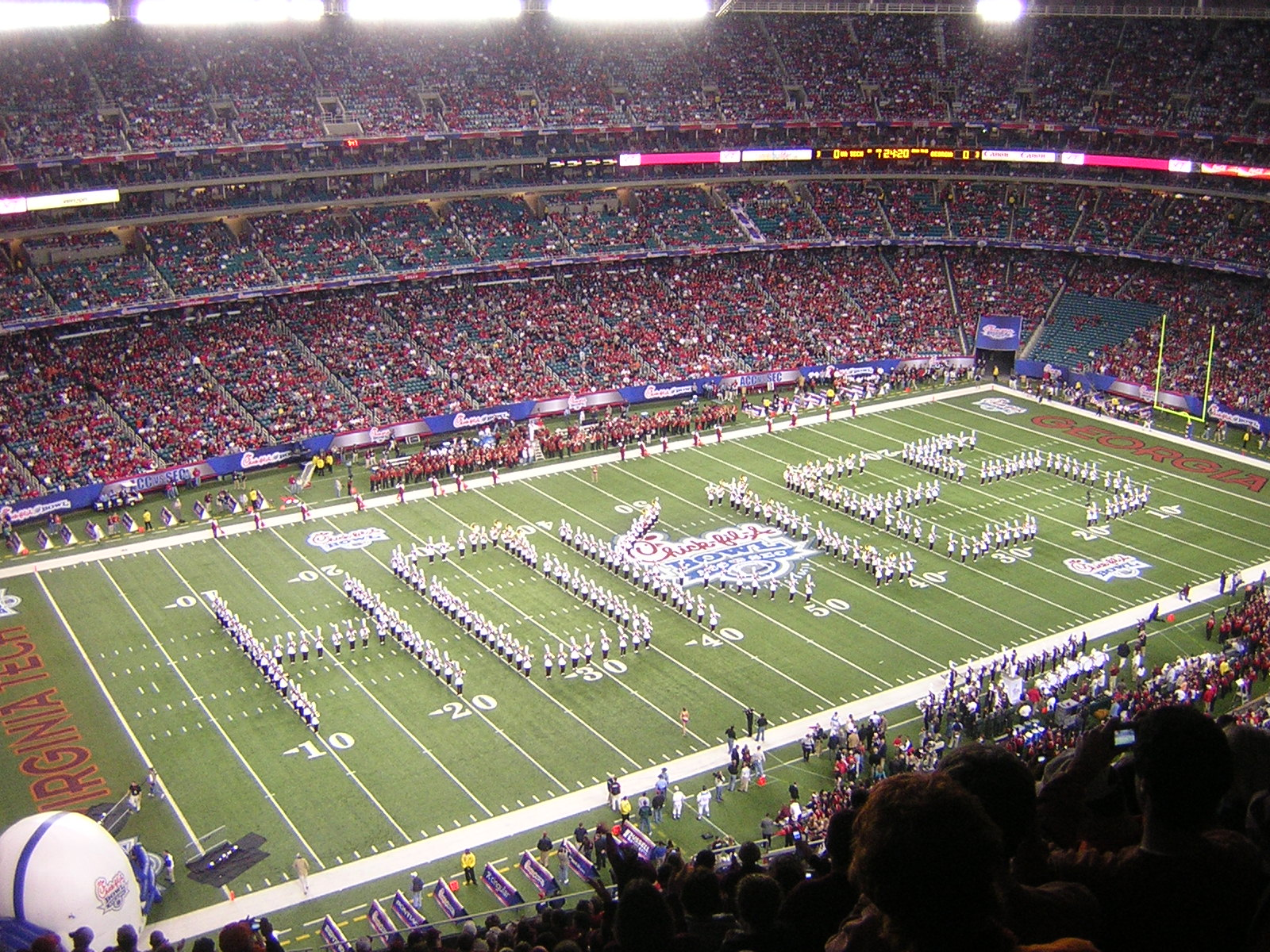
- The Marching Virginians perform at the 2006 Chick-fil-A Bowl
- School: Virginia Tech
- Location: Blacksburg, VA
- Conference: ACC
- Founded: 1974
- Director: Polly Middleton
- Assistant Director: Chad Reep
- Members: 330+
- Website: http://spiritoftech.com

The Marching Virginians are one of the two collegiate marching bands at Virginia Tech (the other being the Highty Tighties, the regimental band of the Virginia Tech Corps of Cadets). Because the Marching Virginians draw from the general student body, they are considerably larger than the Highty Tighties and have about 330 members. Despite offering no scholarships to band members, The Marching Virginians consist of students from every college and virtually every major within the university, as well as several graduate students.

== History ==
Known as "The Spirit of Tech" and established in 1974, the band performs at Virginia Tech football games, fundraisers, and charity events. The Marching Virginians also hold their own yearly charity event, Hokies for the Hungry, during which canned food is collected by band members prior to a Virginia Tech home football game to benefit the Montgomery County Christmas Store. The Marching Virginians are the creators of Virginia Tech's 'Stick It In' cheer, though the MVs were banned from performing this cheer by the Virginia Tech Athletics Department in Fall 2007. However, on October 19, 2019, the Marching Virginians performed 'Stick it In' during their home game against University of North Carolina at Chapel Hill, the first time the chant had been performed in Lane Stadium since the ban.

== Large venue performances ==
The Marching Virginians have performed at the Orange Bowl, Peach Bowl, Independence Bowl, Sugar Bowl, Gator Bowl, Diamond Walnut San Francisco Bowl, and the 2004 BCA Classic, among many other venues. They were also recently featured on the Blacksburg edition of Extreme Makeover: Home Edition, as well as a 2007 ESPN Magazine article written by executive editor Steve Wulf.

== Current info ==
The Marching Virginians are currently under the leadership of director Polly Middleton and assistant director Chad Reep. A majority of the music is arranged by Dr. James Sochinski, and the halftime performances are narrated by Mike Sparrer, "The Voice of the Marching Virginians."

The Marching Virginians are assisted by the Eta Beta chapter of Kappa Kappa Psi and the Zeta Omicron chapter of Tau Beta Sigma.

== Traditions ==
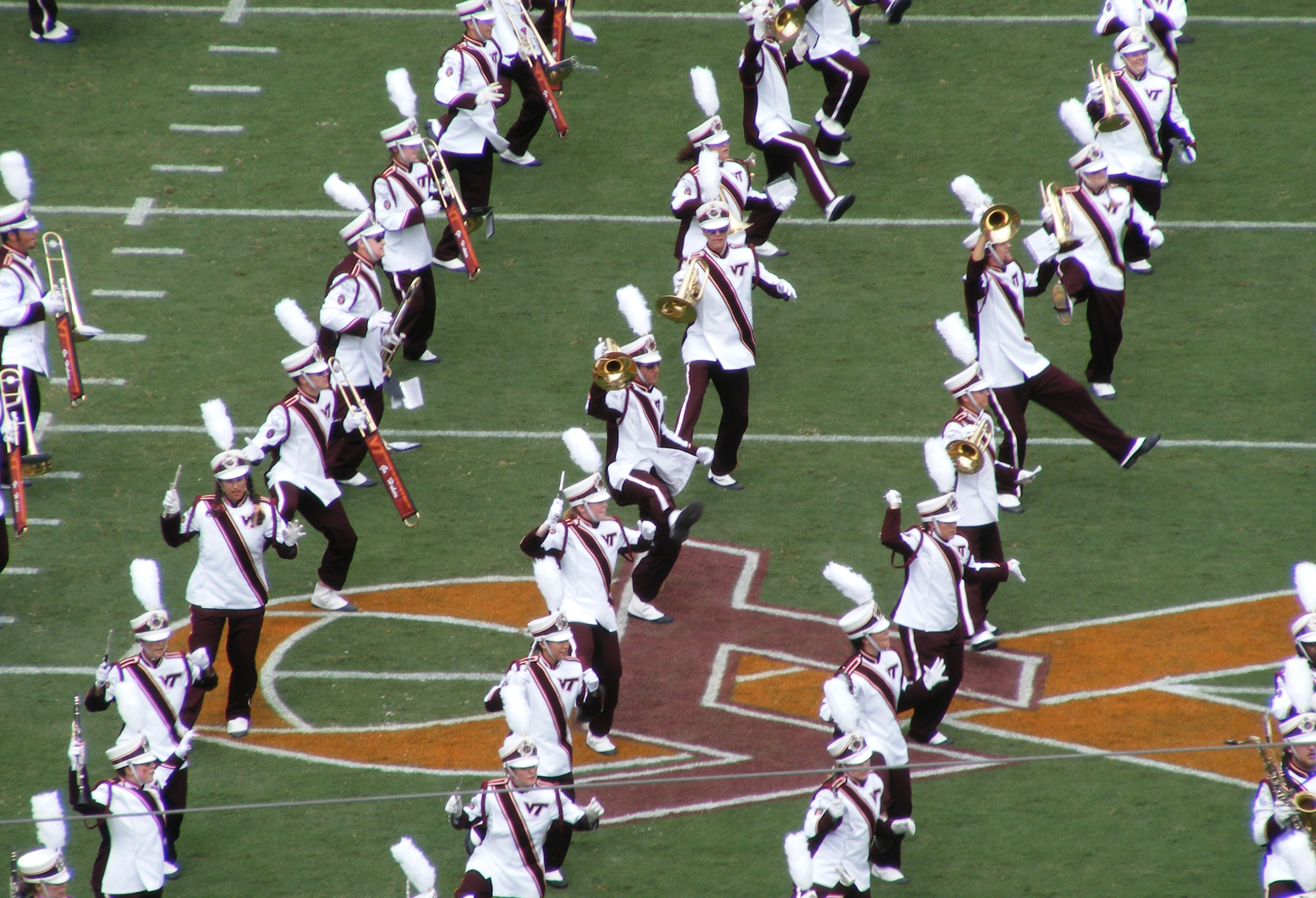
The Marching Virginians perform at Lane Stadium before the Hokies' 2007 opener against the East Carolina Pirates

The Marching Virginians, since their establishment in 1974, have developed a multitude of traditions and rituals:

- For every home game, the Marching Virginians have a pre-game rehearsal (and are sometimes provided breakfast or lunch) before marching to Lane Stadium. Prior to the 2009 season, a small pep-parade from the south-end of the Cassell Coliseum parking lot, down Spring Road, to the south-west tunnel into Lane Stadium at Worsham Field took place. Due to the construction on McComas Hall during 2009, the band marched straight from their practice space at Johnson Track and Field across Spring Road to the tunnel at Worsham Field. The band continued its parade tradition midway through the 2010 season after the renovations completed. As of 2015, due to the construction of the Marching Virginians Center, the Marching Virginians have taken up a new tradition of marching down Chicken Hill lot toward Lane Stadium, cheering with the tailgaters as they march.
- Previously, two "Renegade" Pep Bands roamed the parking lots surrounding the stadium playing for fans before either meeting back up with the rest of the band before a pre-game performance or playing "call-and-answer" style with the main band (east stands) and the other renegade band (other corner of west stands))
- Each section independently develops its own cheers, calls, dances, and chants, sometimes involving inter-sectional cooperation (such as the clarinet/saxophone sections' combined "STROKE-OH!" chant). These chants often begin with a section leader or rank captain calling a command, usually ending in something along the lines of "TWEET-TWEET-HO" to simulate a whistle command.
- The MVs were the original creators of the "Stick It In" cheer, which became one of the most popular cheers of Virginia Tech football before its discontinuance in 2007 by the VT athletic department. The cheer was played multiple times during the 6 overtime game against UNC in 2019, but it is unclear if it will return permanently
- Entering Lane Stadium, each band member falls out of rank, touches his/her hand to the Hokie Stone at the entrance to the field, and falls back into their position in the parade block.
- Far less formal than the Highty-Tighties, the Marching Virginians are allowed to wear their Marching Virginians baseball cap given to them at the beginning of the season (or their MVs ski cap for colder weather). Other forms of personal flair which do not interfere with or deface their uniforms, such as sunglasses, keychains, or temporary facial tattoos, are frequent among band members.

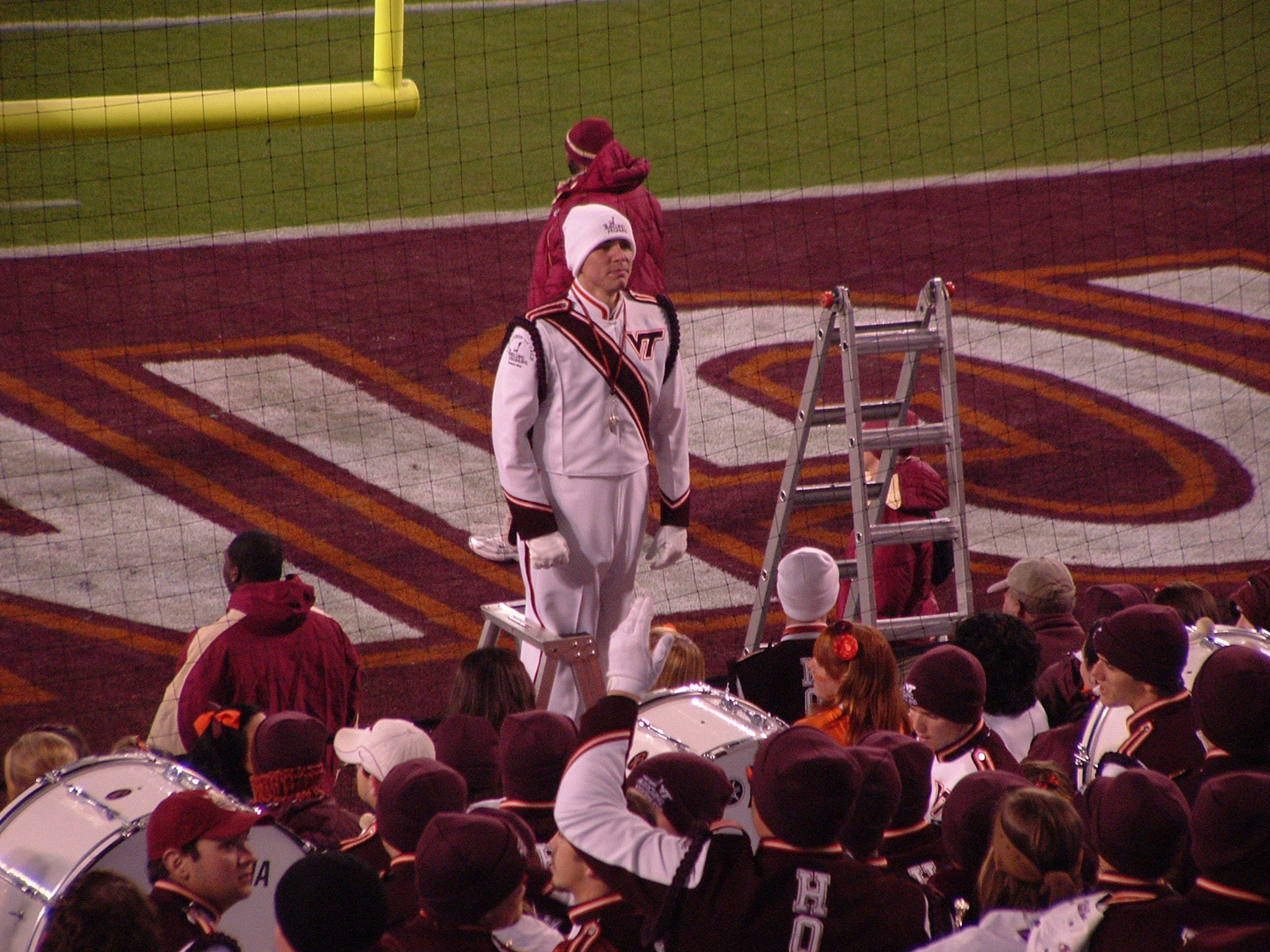
Drum major prepares to conduct The Marching Virginians prior to the 2010 ACC Championship Game.

- In the stands, sections will often choreograph their own dances and horn movements to different songs and drum breaks, giving the sections more individual freedom with their stand music.
- In every fieldshow, the MVs usually perform one to three songs followed by "Tech Triumph" as they march off the field.
- Until the 2017 season, the tuba section led Lane Stadium in the MVs' signature rendition of the Hokie Pokie between the 3rd and 4th quarters of each home football game. As of the 2021 season, the Hokie Pokie has returned and is now performed between the 1st and 2nd quarters of each home football game.

== Music ==
The MVs play the following pieces in the stands on a regular basis, as well as many other favorites.

- Tech Triumph
- VPI Victory March
- Carry Me Back to Old Virginny "Carry Me Back" (Prior to 2020)
- Oh Shenandoah "Shenandoah" (Replaced "Carry Me Back" in 2020)
- Scatman (Ski Ba Bop Ba Dop Bop) "Scatman"
- Carry On Wayward Son
- Radar Love
- Rock This Town
- Jungle Boogie
- Theme From Superman
- Danger Zone
- We Will Rock You during which students will typically shout "We Just Sacked You" (played when the opposing team quarterback has been sacked)
- All of the Lights
- Welcome to the Black Parade
- Bom Bom
- Handclap
- Power (Kanye West song)
- Imperial March
- Frankenstein (Edgar Winter Group)

And of course: The Hokey Pokey, known as "Hokie Pokie" in Blacksburg.

== Sections ==
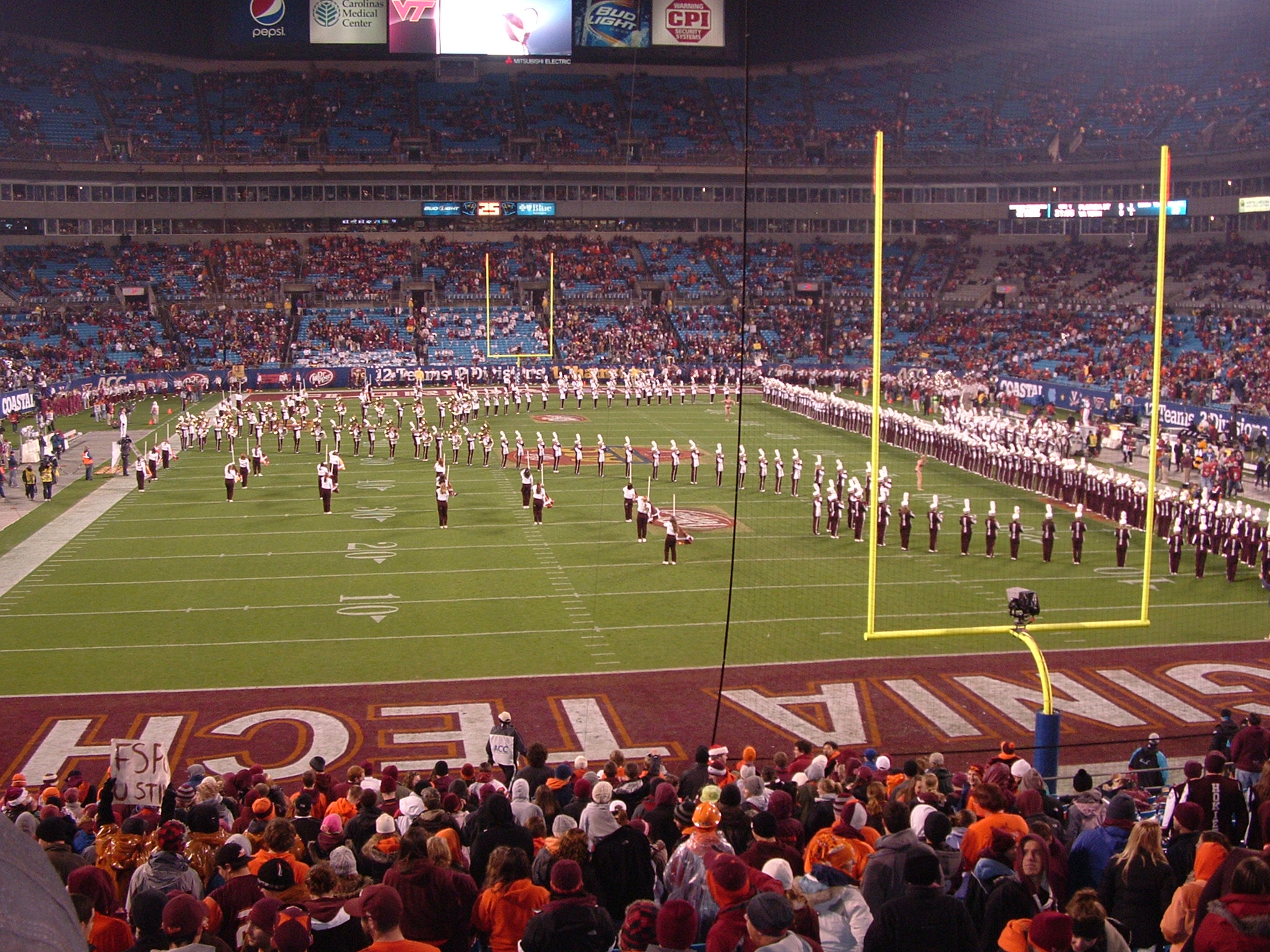
The Marching Virginians make the outline of the Commonwealth of Virginia prior to the 2010 ACC Championship Game.

The MVs currently feature the following instruments

- Piccolo "Pix"
- Clarinet "Nets"
- Saxophone "Saxes"
- Mellophone "Horns"
- Trumpet "Trumpets"
- Trombone "Bones"
- Baritone Horn "Tones"
- Sousaphone "VTubas"
- Percussion "Drumline". It includes snare drums, bass drums, multi-tenor drums, cymbals, and glockenspiels.
- Color guard (flag spinning) "Flag Corps"

In addition to these instruments, the MVs also feature baton twirlers, managers, and drum majors.

== Directors ==
- Roger C. Heath 1974–1976
- James Sochinski 1976–1981
- Harry Price 1981–1986
- David McKee 1986–2018
- Polly Middleton 2018–Present

== Assistant Directors ==
- Jay Crone 1994–2003
- Patrick Casey 2004
- Will Petersen 2005–2009
- Tony Marinello 2009–2011
- Polly Middleton 2011–2015
- Dana Biggs 2016–2017
- Chad Reep 2017–Present
