= Old Hokie =

Spirited cheer, often used by fans of Virginia Tech's athletic teams

"Old Hokie" is a spirited cheer, often used by fans of Virginia Tech's athletic teams. It was coined by Oscar M. Stull (Class of 1896) in a winning student body contest entry to mark the changing of the university's name from Virginia Agricultural and Mechanical College (VAMC) to Virginia Polytechnic Institute and Agricultural and Mechanical College (VPI) in 1896. According to Stull, "Hokie" is a nonsensical word he made up purely as an attention-getter.

In Stull's original version of Old Hokie, several words were spelled differently including "Hokie" itself. The current version adds the 'e' to Hokie and also adds "Team! Team! Team!". After chanting the last line, students hold one hand against a fist with an outward facing thumb to symbolize a turkey and wiggle their fingers.

One person shouts, "ONE, TWO! ONE, TWO!"
Hokie Hokie Hokie Hy
Tech Tech V.P.I!
Sola-Rex, Sola-Rah
Poly Tech Vir-gin-ia
Ray Rah V.P.I.
Team! Team! Team!
<gobble noises>

== See also ==
- Virginia Tech Hokies
- Tech Triumph
