= Hokey Cokey =

Participation dance originating in Britain circa 1826

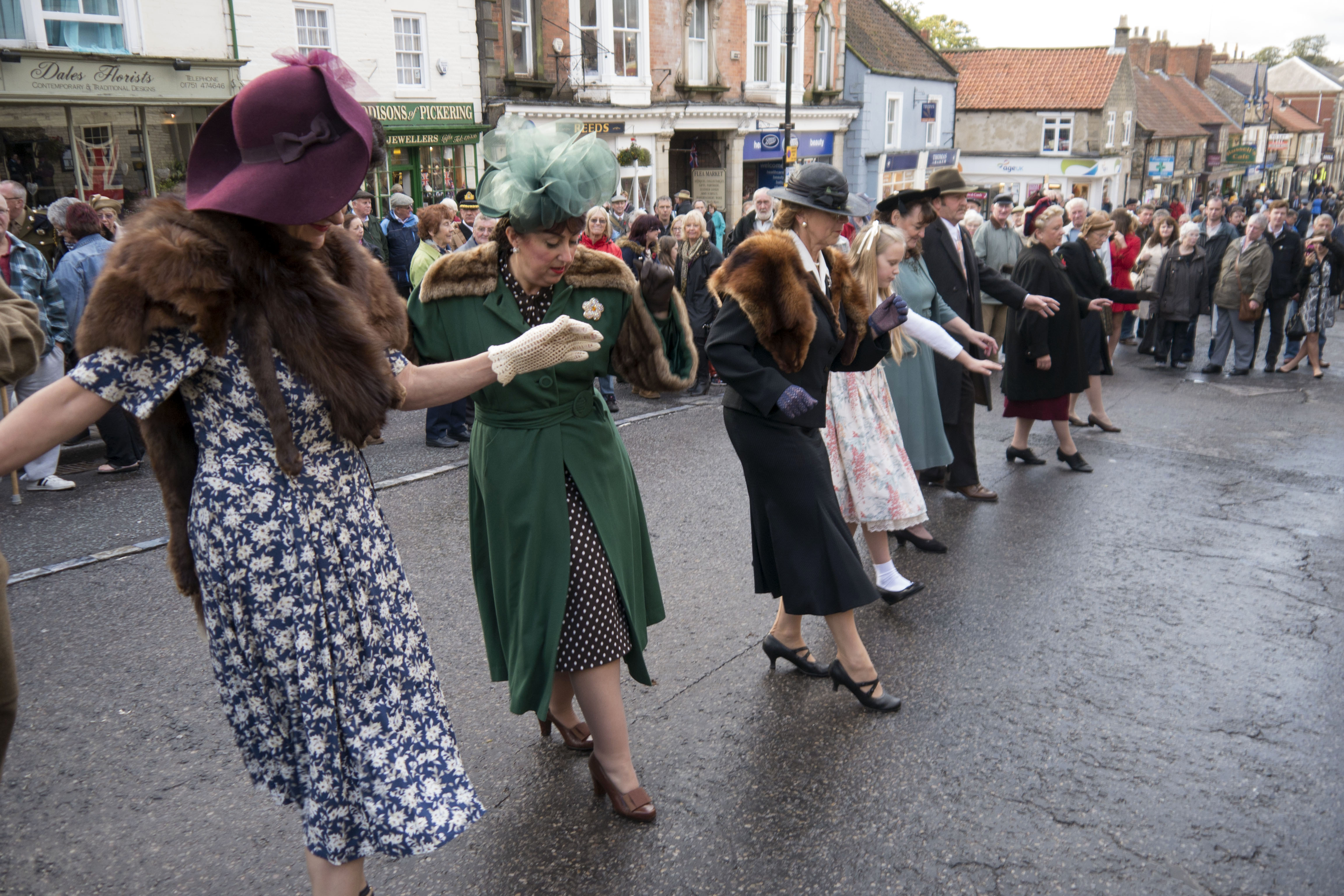
People doing the Hokey Cokey at an annual "Wartime Weekend" in the United Kingdom

The Hokey Cokey (also known as Hokey Pokey in the United States) is a participation dance with a distinctive accompanying tune and lyric structure. It is well-known in English-speaking countries. It originates in a British folk dance, with variants attested as early as 1826. The song and accompanying dance peaked in popularity as a music hall song and novelty dance in the mid-1940s in the UK. The song became a chart hit twice in the 1980s. The first UK hit was by The Snowmen, which peaked at UK No. 18 in 1981.

== Origins and meaning ==
Despite several claims of a recent invention, numerous variants of the song exist with similar dances and lyrics dating back to the 19th century.

From 1842, one of the earlier variants, with a very similar dance to the modern one, is found in Robert Chambers' Popular Rhymes of Scotland. The words there are given as:

Fal de ral la, fal de ral la:
Hinkumbooby, round about;
Right hands in, and left hands out,
Hinkumbooby, round about;
Fal de ral la, fal de ral la.

From 1857, a song rendered ("with appropriate gestures") by two sisters from Canterbury, England, United Kingdom, while on a visit in 1857 to Bridgewater, New Hampshire, United States, starts as an "English/Scottish ditty" in this way:

I put my right hand in,
I put my right hand out,
In out, in out.
shake it all about.

As the song continues, the "left hand" is put in, then the "right foot", then the "left foot", then "my whole head".

From 1872, a version known as "Ugly Mug" is described.

I put my right hand in
I put my right hand out
I give my right hand, shake, shake, shake, and turn myself about

A version from c. 1891 from the town of Golspie, Scotland, was published by Edward W. B. Nicholson:

Hilli ballu ballai!
Hilli ballu ballight!
Hilli ballu ballai!
Upon a Saturday night.

Put all your right feet out,
Put all your left feet in,
Turn them a little, a little,
And turn yourselves about.

In the 1892 book, English Folk-Rhymes, a version of the song originating from Sheffield, England, is given:

Can you dance looby, looby,
Can you dance looby, looby,
Can you dance looby, looby,
All on a Friday night?
You put your right foot in;
And then you take it out,
And wag it, and wag it, and wag it,
Then turn and turn about.

Here we go, Looby Loo.
Here we go, Looby light.
Here we go, Looby Loo.
All on a Saturday night.

From 1940, a later variant of this song is the Shakers' song "Hinkum-Booby", which had more similar lyrics to the modern song and was published in Edward Deming Andrews' A gift to be simple (page 42).

Some early versions of this song thus show a marked resemblance to the modern song Looby (or Loopty) Loo, and the songs have been described as having a common origin.

Published around 1900, the book Charming Talks about People and Places, there is a song with music entitled "Turn The Right Hand In" (page 163). It has nine verses, which run as: "Turn the right hand in, turn the right hand out, give your hands a very good shake, and turn your body around". Additional verses include v2. left hand...; v3. both hands...; v4. right foot...; v5. left foot...; v6. both feet...; v7. right cheek...; v8. left cheek...; and, v9. both cheeks... The tune is not the same as the later popular version of the Hokey Cokey, but the last verse of the lyrics is more similar as it states to "turn your body around". No author, composer or lyricist was credited there.

In recent times various other claims about the origins of the song have arisen, but they are all contradicted by the evidence of the publication history. One of these accounts tells that in 1940, during The Blitz in the Second World War, when Nazi Germany was bombarding London, a Canadian officer suggested to Al Tabor, a British bandleader of the 1920s–1940s, that he could write a party song with moves similar to "Under the Spreading Chestnut Tree". The inspiration for the song's title that resulted, "The Hokey Pokey", supposedly came from an ice cream vendor whom Tabor had heard as a boy, calling out "Hokey Pokey penny a lump. Have a lick make you jump". According to Tabor's grandson, playwright Alan Balfour, Tabor change the name to "Hokey Cokey" because he thought it sounded better. A well-known lyricist/songwriter/music publisher of the time, Jimmy Kennedy, reneged on a financial agreement to promote and publish it, and finally Tabor settled out of court, giving up all rights to the number.

In 2008, an Anglican cleric, Canon Matthew Damon, provost of Wakefield Cathedral, West Yorkshire, claimed that the dance movements were a parody of the traditional Catholic Latin Mass. Up until the reforms of Vatican II, the priest performed his movements facing the altar rather than the congregation, who could not hear the words very well, nor understand the Latin, nor clearly see his movements. At one point the priest would say "Hoc est corpus meum", Latin for "This is My body" (a phrase that has also been suggested as the origin of the similar-sounding stereotypical magician's phrase "hocus-pocus"). That theory led Scottish politician Michael Matheson in 2008 to urge police action "against individuals who use it [the song and dance] to taunt Catholics". Matheson's claim was deemed ridiculous by fans from both sides of the Old Firm (the rival Glasgow football teams Celtic and Rangers) and calls were made on fans' forums for both sides to join together to sing the song on 27 December 2008 at Ibrox Stadium. Close relatives of Jimmy Kennedy and Al Tabor have publicly stated their recollections of the origin and meaning of Hokey Cokey, and have denied its connection to the Mass or to an imitation of it. Relatives' accounts differ, but they all agree on the fact that the song existed and was published decades before its supposed composition in the 1940s.

== Dance across the world ==
=== Australia ===
In Australia, the dance may be called the "hokey pokey" or the "hokey cokey." It was a hit for Johnny Chester & The Chessmen in 1961.

=== Denmark ===
Mostly performed in the British style of the dance, it is known as the "boogie woogie" (pronounced /ˌbʊɡiː ˈwʊɡiː/).

=== Germany ===
Performed mainly in the carnival in a variation of the British style of the dance, it is known as "Rucki-Zucki".

=== Mexico ===
Released as a commercial recording by Tatiana (singer) as "Hockey-Pockey".

=== New Zealand ===
In the North Island, the dance is usually known as the "hokey tokey", or the "hokey cokey" (hokey pokey is the usual term for honeycomb toffee). In the South Island it's just The Hokey Pokey.

=== United Kingdom ===
Known as the "hokey cokey" or the "hokey kokey", the song and accompanying dance peaked in popularity as a music hall song and novelty dance in the mid-1940s in Britain.

There is a claim of authorship by the British/Irish songwriter Jimmy Kennedy, responsible for the lyrics to popular songs such as the wartime "We're Going to Hang out the Washing on the Siegfried Line" and the children's song "Teddy Bears' Picnic". Sheet music copyrighted in 1942 and published by Campbell Connelly & Co Ltd, agents for Kennedy Music Co Ltd, styles the song as "the Cokey Cokey".

In the 1973 Thames Television documentary, May I Have the Pleasure?, about the Hammersmith Palais de Danse, Lou Preager comments on how his was the first band to record the 'Okey Cokey'.

EMI Gold released a Monsta Mash CD featuring the "Monsta Hokey Cokey" written and produced by Steve Deakin-Davies of "The Ambition Company".

The song was used by comedian Bill Bailey during his "Part Troll" tour, however, it was reworked by Bailey into a style of the German electronic group Kraftwerk, including quasi-German lyrics and Kraftwerk's signature robotic dance moves.

The comedy act Ida Barr, a fictional East End pensioner who mashes up music hall songs with rap numbers, almost always finishes her shows with the hokey cokey, performed over a thumping RnB backing. Ida Barr is performed by British comedian Kit Green.

=== United States ===
Known as the "hokey pokey", it became popular in the US in the 1950s. Its originator in the US is debatable:

- Larry LaPrise, Charles Macak, and Tafit Baker of the musical group the Ram Trio, better known as the Sun Valley Trio, recorded the song in 1948 and it was released in 1950. They have generally been credited with creating this novelty dance as entertainment for the ski crowd at the Sun Valley, Idaho resort.
- However, two club musicians from Scranton, Pennsylvania, Robert Degen and Joseph P. Brier, had previously copyrighted a very similar song, "The Hokey Pokey Dance", in 1944. (One account says that copyright was granted in 1946.) According to Degan's son in The New York Times, Degan and Brier wrote the song while playing for the summer at a resort near the Delaware Water Gap. Degan resided at Richmond Place Rehabilitation and Health Center in Lexington, Kentucky, until he died on November 23, 2009, aged 104.
- Degen and Brier, who died in 1991, sued the members of the Ram Trio, and several record companies and music publishers for copyright infringement, demanding $200,000 in damages and $1 for each record of the LaPrise "Hokey Pokey". The suit was settled out of court. LaPrise later sold the rights to his version to country-western music star Roy Acuff's Nashville publishing company, Acuff-Rose Music; that company was sold to Sony/ATV Music Publishing in 2002.
- A competing authorship claim is made by or on behalf of British bandleader Gerry Hoey from around 1940, under the title "The Hoey Oka".

In 1953, Ray Anthony's big band recording of the song turned it into a nationwide sensation. The distinctive vocal was by singer Jo Ann Greer, who simultaneously sang with the Les Brown band and dubbed the singing voices for such film stars as Rita Hayworth, Kim Novak, June Allyson, and Esther Williams. (She also charted with Anthony later the same year with the song "Wild Horses".)

In 1978, Mike Stanglin produced a "skating version" of the Hokey Pokey, for use in skating rinks.

== Dance moves ==
=== British and Irish style of dance ===
The instruction set goes as follows:

You put your [left leg] in,
Your [left leg] out;
In, out, in, out,
Shake it all about.
You do the hokey cokey,
And you turn around.
That's what it's all about!

On "You do the hokey cokey", each participant joins their right and left hands at the fingertips to make a chevron and rocks the chevron from side to side. After that the participants separately, but in time with the others, turn around (usually clockwise when viewed from above – novices may go in the opposite direction to the main group, but this adds more hilarity to this joyous, novelty dance). The hands are either still joined together or moved as in a jogging motion – dependent on local tradition or individual choice.

Each instruction set is followed by a chorus, entirely different from other parts of the world. There is either a caller, within or outside the group, or the instructions are called by the whole group – which can add to the confusion and is laughed off as part of the dance's charm and amusement.

Whoa, the hokey cokey,
Whoa, the hokey cokey,
Whoa, the hokey cokey.
Knees bent, arms stretched,
Rah, rah, rah!

The first three lines of this chorus are sometimes rendered 'Whoa, the hokey cokey', with the 'whoa' lasting three beats instead of two. It can also be said "Whoa, the hokey cokey cokey".

For this chorus, all participants stand in a circle and hold hands: on each "Whoa" they raise their joined hands in the air and run in toward the centre of the circle, and on "...the hokey cokey" they run backwards out again. This instruction and chorus are repeated for the other limb, then for the upper right, and then the upper left arm. Either the upper or lower limbs may start first, and either left or right, depending on local tradition, or by random choice on the night. On the penultimate line they bend their knees then stretch their arms, as indicated, and on "Rah, rah, rah!" they either clap in time or raise their arms above their heads and push upwards in time. Sometimes each subsequent verse and chorus is a little faster and louder, with the ultimate aim of making people chaotically run into each other in gleeful abandon. There is a final instruction set with "you put your whole self in, etc", cramming the centre of the dance floor.

Often, the final chorus is sung twice, the second time even faster and the song ends with the joyous chant, 'aye tiddly aye tie, brown bread!'.

=== American and Australian style of dance ===
The dance follows the instructions given in the lyrics of the song, which may be prompted by a bandleader, a participant, or a recording. A sample instruction sequence would be:

You put your [left leg] in,
You put your [left leg] out;
You put your [left leg] in,
And you shake it all about.
You do the hokey pokey,
And you turn (yourself) around.
That's what it's all about!

Participants stand in a circle. On "in" they put the appropriate body part in the circle, and on "out" they put it out of the circle. On "And you shake it all about", the body part is shaken three times (on "shake", "all", and "-bout", respectively). Throughout "You do the hokey pokey, / And you turn yourself around", the participants spin in a complete circle with the arms raised at 90° angles and the index fingers pointed up, shaking their arms up and down and their hips side to side seven times (on "do", "hoke-", "poke-", "and", "turn", "-self", and "-round" respectively). For the final "That's what it's all about", the participants clap with their hands out once on "that's" and "what" each, clap under the knee with the leg lifted up on "all", clap behind the back on "a-", and finally one more clap with the arms out on "-bout".

The body parts usually included are, in order, "right foot", "left foot", "right hand", "left hand", "head", "buttocks" (or "backside"), fingers, toes, hair, lips, tongue and "whole self"; the body parts "right elbow", "left elbow", "right hip", and "left hip" are often included as well.

In Australia, the song has a chorus similar to the British version in melody.

Whoa, the hokey pokey,
Whoa, the hokey pokey,
Whoa, the hokey pokey.
That's what it's all about!

On each "pokey", the participants again raise the arms at 90° angles with the index fingers pointed up, shaking their arms up and down and their hips side to side five times.

== Copyright ==
In the United States, Sony/ATV Music Publishing controls some of the publishing rights to the "Hokey Pokey".

== In popular culture ==
=== Advertising ===
- It was used in a 2005 Velveeta Salsa Dip commercial.
- In a 1982 radio advert for Video 2000 by Mel Smith and Griff Rhys Jones, a character refers to a television called the "Hokey Cokey 2000".
- It was used in a Marvel toy commercial with parody lyrics in the mid-2010s.
- It was used in a 2019 Apple Watch commercial.

=== Comedy and humor ===
- Comedian Jim Breuer performs the "hokey pokey" as he imagines it would be interpreted by AC/DC, commenting on the band's ability to turn any song, no matter how mundane, into a rock anthem.
- Comedian Bill Bailey performed a Kraftwerk inspired version of the "Hokey Cokey" for his Part Troll tour.
- There is a joke about when Larry LaPrise died, his family had trouble getting him into his coffin ("they put his left leg in, and that's where the tragedy began…").

=== Music ===
(Alphabetical by group)

- In 2003, Filipina actress Ai-Ai delas Alas did a Tagalog version of "Hokey Cokey", entitled Ang Tanging Ina which from the movie of the same title and a TV series of the same title.
- In 2004, Bill Bailey performed a version of the "Hokey Kokey" in German and in the style of Kraftwerk, on his Part Troll tour.
- In 1985, the British pop band Black Lace released their version of the song as a single under the title "Hokey Cokey". This version peaked at #31 in the UK.
- The horror-themed heavy metal band Haunted Garage recorded a humorous hardcore punk version of the hokey cokey on their album Possession Park (1991).
- The Canadian kids' bands Judy & David (1993) and Sharon, Lois & Bram (1998) did covers.
- In 1979, the rock band Slade released a version titled "Okey Cokey" as a single. It failed to enter the UK Singles Chart but did reach number 96 in Record Business magazine's The Singles Chart. The song was later included on the group's EP Xmas Ear Bender (1980) and album Crackers: The Christmas Party Album (1985).
- In 1981, a band of uncredited musicians known as The Snowmen had a #18 UK hit with the song; there have been persistent unsubstantiated rumours that the vocalist was Ian Dury, yet it was session guitarist and singer Martin Kershaw, as revealed by author Richard Balls in 2015. Rudolph the Red-Nosed Reindeer is also played during the break.
- In 1974 the UK singer Kristine Sparkle released her glam pop rock version as a single and on her first album.
- Alternative band The Three O'Clock used the roller skating version of the Hokey Cokey in the video for their song "Her Head's Revolving." The video opens and ends with them doing the hokey cokey. It is available at YouTube.
- In 2002, Jimmy Buffett released "What If the Hokey Pokey Is All It Really Is About?", on his album Far Side of the World. After listing all the ills and mysteries to which our modern world is prey, he imagines the solution in its simplest form: The Hokey Pokey.
- The song 'Petty Sessions' from Half Man Half Biscuit's 2008 album CSI:Ambleside is the Hokey Cokey with alternative satirical lyrics - the title being a pun on a form of magistrate's court for minor public nuisance offences in England and Wales which had been abolished in 2004.
- In 1963, Sheila released a French version of "Hokey Cokey" called "Ouki-Kouki".

=== Sports ===
- The Marching Virginians of Virginia Tech play this song (known as the "Hokie Pokie" at Virginia Tech because of their mascot) between the third and fourth quarters at all Virginia Tech football games. Much of the crowd participates in the dance, as do the tubas during much of the song and the rest of the band during the tuba feature. The song is also generally used as the Marching Virginians' dance number in the first half-time field show of the year, and an abbreviated version is played as a "Spirit Spot" (short song used between plays during the football game) after a big play.
- The University of Iowa Hawkeye football team, under coach Hayden Fry, used to perform the hokey cokey after particularly impressive victories, such as over Michigan and Ohio State. On September 3, 2010, a crowd of 7,384 – with Fry present – performed the hokey cokey in Coralville, Iowa, establishing a new world record.

=== Television ===
- The BBC TV comedy series 'Allo 'Allo! showed one of its characters (Herr Otto Flick) demonstrating a variation of the Hokey Cokey in an episode from season 3. Being a Gestapo officer the lyrics are changed to reflect his sinister nature, as follows:

You put your left boot in
You take your left boot out
You do a lot of shouting
And you shake your fist about
You light a little smokey
And you burn down the town
That's what it's all about
Heil!
Aah, Himmler Himmler Himmler—

- In the Arthur episode "Best of the Nest", Francine remarks that the only way to scare off a bear is to do the Hokey-Pokey. Binky claims that it's stupid, but when a bear attacks the campsite, Binky and his friends start doing the Hokey-Pokey.
- In the Babylon 5 episode "A Voice in the Wilderness, Part I", the Centauri Ambassador, Londo Mollari refers to the song as further evidence of the incomprehensible nature of human culture.
- In the Full House episode "Greek Week", Papouli says that according to Pompadoras tradition, getting married consists of "giving a girl flowers, walking around the table, and that's what it's all about". Danny Tanner replies to this comment by saying, "That's not a wedding. That's the Hokey-Pokey."
- In the Pee-wee's Playhouse episode "Party", Pee-wee Herman and his playhouse visitors perform this dance.
- In the Sesame Street segment Elmo's World, the hokey pokey was performed on The Dancing Channel in the episode, "Dancing".
  - Elmo does the dance from the 2003 hot toy "Hokey Pokey".
    - Inspired by the book and viral commercials, two monsters, Big Bird and Emma Memma do the dance.
- In the episode "Chinga" (5×10) of the TV series The X-Files, the song is featured at multiple times during the episode.
- The song was also featured on The Backyardigans in the "Cave Party" episode.
- On a May 24, 2019, episode of The Tonight Show Starring Jimmy Fallon, host Jimmy Fallon and radio personality Howard Stern danced the hokey pokey in a Times Square billboard in front of a crowd in New York City.
- The song was featured in BBC's Wartime Farm episode 8, showing the characteristic choreography.
- In the Count Duckula episode "Dead Eye Duck", the shoot-out takes place at the Okay Kokay Corral, which is an obvious pun on the O.K. Corral as well as this dance.
- In the Buffy the Vampire Slayer episode "Intervention", Giles performs a ritual with elements similar to the Hokey-pokey. Buffy remarks: "I know this ritual! The ancient shamans were next called upon to do the hokey-pokey and turn themselves around." After the ritual, she adds, "And that's what it's all about."
- A portion of the song was danced by the Bay of Pigswatch cast in Muppets Tonight episode 204.
- In the final episode of Bojack Horseman, "Nice While It Lasted", Todd Chavez and Bojack Horseman discuss the meaning of life by using the Hokey-Pokey as a metaphor. Todd observes that most people think the song (and life) is about 'the Hokey-Pokey', where as he believes differently and observes "It's like the song says. You do the Hokey-Pokey and you turn yourself around. 'You turn yourself around!'; that's what it's all about!" - Implying that life isn't about 'the Hokey-Pokey' parts of life, but that it's about making changes and fixing mistakes. Bojack Horseman gives little credit to the song and quips "Yeah, I don't know if the song writers put that much thought into the existential significance of the lyrics; they literally rhyme 'about' with 'about'."
- This song was used as a "song of the week" in 1988 on Polka Dot Door.
- In the cartoon My Little Pony: Friendship Is Magic season one finale, Pinkie Pie sings a pony-style version of the song.

=== Film ===
- The 1947 British film Frieda features a group of dancers in a dance hall singing and performing the hokey cokey.
- In the 1988 film Cherry 2000, the Hokey Pokey is performed by the fanatical followers of the film's antagonist Lester (Tim Thomerson) after he murders a tracker.
- In both the English and German versions of Animals United (2010), Charles the Rooster walks to this song while the Other Animals coming to Africa and “The Valley of Death”

=== Video games ===
- In the video game Constructor (1997), the Thief in the Pawn Shop can be heard mentioning a computer called the "Hokey Cokey 2000".
- The music that plays in the options menu of the SNES video game Super Troll Islands heavily resembles the Hokey Cokey.
- A Parody of the song appears in the mascot horror game Poppy Playtime at the start of the Chapter 5: Broken Things, during the Wrongside Outimals Commercial.
