= HokieBird =

Mascot of Virginia Polytechnic Institute and State University

- University: Virginia Tech
- Conference: ACC
- Description: turkey
- First seen: 1962

The HokieBird is the official mascot of Virginia Polytechnic Institute and State University (Virginia Tech) in Blacksburg, Virginia.

The successor to Virginia Tech's Fighting Gobblers, the HokieBird was created in 1981 and has retained its current appearance since 1987. A large anthropomorphic turkey, the HokieBird has become a cultural phenomenon, making appearances in media, children's books, and public events. The HokieBird was featured in a 2003 episode of Animal Planet's "Turkey Secrets".

== Gobblers ==
Fans of Virginia Tech athletics referred to teams by the nickname Fighting Gobblers from the early 20th century until the term “Hokies” was adopted in recent years. According to the Virginia Tech university relations, the name originated in 1909, when football coach Branch Bocock initiated his players into the "Gobbler Club", a name which appeared in print that same year. Another popular legend regarding the origin of the "Gobblers" moniker refers to when the university was a military college known as the Virginia Agricultural and Mechanical College (VAMC). As future military officers and gentlemen, cadets were not allowed to look at their plates as they ate. To do so was termed "gobbling" your food and was a cause for punishment. Athletes were given increased portions of food and in consideration of the limited meal time, were allowed to "gobble" their meals. Because of this, the sports teams for VAMC became known as "The Gobblers". The 1909 football team was the first team to be referred to in print as the "Gobblers", and it became the official nickname in 1912.

Regardless of the true origin, the "Gobbler" nickname had already been popularized by 1913 when local resident and VPI employee Floyd Meade trained a large turkey to perform various stunts, including pulling him in a decorated cart before a football game. Meade and other mascots to follow continued having a live turkey on the sidelines of games into the 1950s.

== Fighting Gobblers ==
The first permanent costumed Gobbler took the field in the fall of 1962, when a civil engineering student named Mercer MacPherson, raised $200 to create a costume which had a head resembling a cardinal and included real turkey feathers dyed in school colors. This mascot debuted at the then-annual Thanksgiving Day football game between military school rivals VPI and VMI. This costume was modified in 1971 to include a long neck, making it more than seven feet (2.13 m) tall, and the name was changed to the "Fighting Gobbler".

== HokieBird ==
In reaction to the earlier myths about students "gobbling" their meals, football coach and athletic director Bill Dooley spearheaded a campaign for a new look and name for the mascot, which debuted at the 1981 game against Wake Forest. The turkey-like figure was referred to as "the Hokie mascot," "the Hokie," and "the Hokie bird" (derived from the "Old Hokie" cheer), which resulted in changing the official designation of the Virginia Tech mascot to the Hokies.

The costume worn by today's HokieBird made its first appearance in 1987, when Frank Beamer returned as coach. Although he reinstated the Gobbler to the football team's scoreboard, by then the Hokies nickname had already become the most prominent. The current HokieBird debuted at that season's home opener against Clemson, arriving in a white limousine.

HokieBird Curtis Dvorak (1995–96) won the National Cheerleading Association championship in 1996 and has appeared as Jaxson de Ville, mascot of the Jacksonville Jaguars since 1996. Todd Maroldo, Hokiebird in 1996–1997, won the National Cheerleading Association championship in 1997 and was hired as the Carolina Panthers mascot, Sir Purr.

HokieBird has been so popular that the mascot landed an appearance on Animal Planet's "Turkey Secrets," shown annually around Thanksgiving. Now, when referring to Virginia Tech, the term "Hokie" generally refers to a Virginia Tech student.

Beyond athletics, the HokieBird has also hosted events for the community. Often seen rollerblading through campus, HokieBird has been known to respond to tweets and visit classes, dormitories, and dining halls. The official X account of the HokieBird is @TheHokieBird or x.com/thehokiebird

It is unknown how many students serve as HokieBirds during any given school year, and the entire try-out process remains a secret.

== Traditions ==
HokieBird bench presses the score in the endzone

- Before football games, the HokieBird leads the charge onto the field as students jump up and down in the stands to Metallica's "Enter Sandman".
- After scores in football, the VT cheerleaders carry out a bench and weights for the HokieBird to perform bench presses. He does one press for every point VT has scored. Sometimes, in lieu of bench presses, the HokieBird has done situps or pushups.
- The HokieBird has also been known to crowd surf from the bottom of the Corps of Cadets student section all the way to the top of the section.
- At the graduation ceremony, students who portrayed the HokieBird are allowed to wear the giant orange bird feet. In theory, no one is supposed to know who the HokieBirds are until graduation day.

== See also ==
- Virginia Tech Hokies
