= Larry LaPrise =

American songwriter (1912—1996)

Roland Lawrence "Larry" LaPrise (November 11, 1912 — April 4, 1996) was an American musician and songwriter who at one point held the U.S. copyright for the "Hokey Pokey" song.

LaPrise was born in Detroit, Michigan. He wrote "Do The Hokey Pokey" in the early 1940s for the après-ski crowd at a club in Sun Valley, Idaho. The song was first recorded by his group the Ram Trio (on the record they're known as the Sun Valley Trio) (with Charles Macak and Tafit Baker) in 1948. They were awarded U.S. copyright in 1950. The authorship of the Hokey Pokey is disputed, with Irish songwriter Jimmy Kennedy having published the original "Cokey-Coney" in 1942. Robert Degan sued LaPrise for copyright infringement of his 1946 "The Hokey-Pokey Dance". They settled out of court.

After the group broke up in the mid-1960s, LaPrise worked for the Post Office in Ketchum, Idaho.

LaPrise died, aged 83, in Gooding, Idaho.
