= WGAT =

- Gate City, Virginia; United States
- Broadcast area: Scott County, Virginia; Kingsport, Tennessee
- Frequency: 1050 kHz

Programming
- Format: Southern gospel

Ownership
- Owner: Tri-Cities Broadcasting Corporation

History
- First air date: July 24, 1959
- Last air date: October 2, 2019
- Call sign meaning: Gate City

Technical information
- Facility ID: 67667
- Class: B
- Power: 1,000 watts daytime; 267 watts nighttime
- Transmitter coordinates: 36°37′59″N 82°34′56″W

WGAT was a southern gospel-formatted broadcast radio station licensed to Gate City, Virginia, serving Gate City and Scott County, Virginia, and Kingsport, Tennessee. WGAT was owned and operated by Tri-Cities Broadcasting Corporation. Its license was cancelled October 2, 2019.

== History of call letters ==
The call letters WGAT were previously assigned to an AM station in Utica, New York.
