= Tech Triumph =

Fight song of Virginia Tech

Song
- Published: 1919
- Genre: fight song
- Songwriters: Wilfred Pete Maddux; Mattie Eppes (Boggs)

"Tech Triumph" is the fight song of Virginia Tech. It was composed in 1919 by Wilfred Pete Maddux (class of 1920) and Mattie Eppes (Boggs).

The song is noted for beginning with the opening notes of Reveille — a nod to Tech's past as an all-male military school.

== Composers ==
Wilfred Preston ("Pete") Maddux, a trombone and baritone player in the Virginia Tech Regimental Band (member of the band from the Fall of 1917 to 1919), jointly composed "Tech Triumph" in 1919 along with Mattie Walton Eppes (Boggs). Mattie Eppes was a neighbor of Pete in his hometown of Blackstone, Virginia. When he was home, Pete would often play violin with Mattie accompanying him on the piano. One evening in the summer of 1919, Pete asked her to help him compose a fight song for VPI. She played the tune and Pete wrote out the score and the words for two verses in a single evening. Pete Maddux is not listed in the yearbook with the band after 1919. Miss Eppes later married John C. Boggs, Superintendent of Randolph-Macon Military Academy.

== Lyrics ==
Techmen, we're Techmen, with spirit true and faithful,
Backing up our teams with hopes undying;
Techmen, Oh, Techmen, we're out to win today,
Showing pep and life with which we're trying;
V.P., old V.P., you know our hearts are with you
In our luck which never seems to die;
Win or lose, we'll greet you with a glad returning,
You're the pride of V.P.I.

Chorus:

Just watch our men so big and active
Support the Orange and Maroon. Let's go Techs.
We know our ends and backs are stronger,
With winning hopes, we fear defeat no longer.
To see our team plow through the line, boys.
Determined now to win or die:
So give a Hokie, Hokie, Hokie, Hi,
Rae, Ri, old V.P.I.

Second Verse, seldom used:

Fight, men, oh, fight, men, we're going to be the champions
Adding to our list another victory;
Football or baseball, the games in which we star,
They're the sports which made old VP famous.
Hold'em, just hold'em, you know the Corps' behind you
Watching every movement that you make.
Winning games was nothing for our teams before you --
Keep the "rep" for VP's sake.

== First performance ==
The song was first performed on Saturday, November 1, 1919, before the football game between V.P.I. and Washington and Lee University. The issue of the university newspaper noted:

On arriving at the grounds, the battalion was formed for the review on the football field. After passing in review before the grandstand, the four companies formed a hollow square with the band in the center, and the band played our new song, 'Tech Triumph'.

— Nov. 5, 1919, The Virginia Tech

In a letter to The Virginia Tech published on Dec. 10, 1919, Maddux expressed his appreciation to the student body.

To the Editor of "The Va. Tech,"
Blacksburg, Virginia
Dear Billy [Virginia Tech editor William Clift]

May I take this means of asking you to express through the columns of "The Tech" my sincere appreciation for the generous way in which the Corps received our new song. It is needless to say that the hearty approval of the student body makes me fell highly pleased, for I am quite sure that those who love their Alma Mater are as eager as I am to see the song become more popularly distributed.

While, of course, every one realizes that I expect to benefit financially through the publication of "Tech Triumph", I want every body to know that it is mainly my devotion and love to the college, which I am proud to boast as my Alma Mater, that prompted me to write the song and it is for the sake of "Tech" that I want it to receive a wide circulation. It is more than gratifying to me to see the ardent spirit and loyalty which the Corps manifests when every man lends his lusty voice to swell the chorus of football singing.

You may be interested to know that the college has approved the song officially and a large number of copies will be sent out by the college to high schools throughout the state as an advertisement of the spirit of "Tech." If I will not be presuming too much upon your kindness, may I ask that you help boost the song through "The Virginia Tech," and furthermore that you encourage the men of V.P.I. to join us in spreading our song around the country until V.P.I. will be known throughout the South and the country at large.

Thanking you again for your cooperation in making the publication of "Tech Triumph" a success, ::I am

Yours very cordially,
W.P. Maddux

== Other uses ==
A strain of the Bliss Triumph potato developed for its disease resistance by Virginia Tech researchers in 1926 and was named Tech Triumph.

== See also ==
- Highty-Tighties
- Marching Virginians
