= The Singer in the Mask =

Israeli reality singing competition

- Genre: Reality competition
- Based on: King of Mask Singer by Munhwa Broadcasting Corporation (The Masked Singer)
- Presented by: Ido Rosenblum
- Starring: Ofira Asayag; Shahar Hason; Tzedi Tzarfati; Bar Refaeli (season 5-); Moshe Peretz (season 5-); Static (seasons 1-4); Ben El Tavori (seasons 1-3)
- Country of origin: Israel
- Original language: Hebrew
- No. of seasons: 5
- No. of episodes: 80

Production
- Executive producer: Nora Island
- Producers: Asaf Gil; Eli Ohana; Avi Sidi
- Camera setup: Neve Ilan Communication Campus
- Running time: 30-90 minutes
- Production company: Keshet Media Group

Original release
- Network: Channel 12
- Release: 23 September 2020 – present

The Singer in the Mask (Hebrew: הזמר במסכה, romanized: HaZamar b'Masekha) is an Israeli reality singing competition television show based on The Masked Singer franchise which originated from the South Korean version of the show King of Mask Singer. It is broadcast on the Israeli network, Channel 12.

The first season premiered on 23 September 2020 and finished on 5 December 2020. At the finale of the first season, the Rooster (actor/singer Tzachi Halevy) was declared the winner while the Dragonfly (singer and children's star Rinat Gabay) was the runner-up.

A second season premiered on 16 October 2021 and finished on 18 December 2021. At the finale of the second season, the Gorilla (actor/singer Shay Gabso) was declared the winner while the Spaghetti (actor Oz Zehavi) was the runner-up.

A third season premiered on 17 December 2022 and finished on 18 February 2023. At the finale of the third season, the Spider (actress Yael Elkana) was declared the winner while the Fish (singer/actress Adi Bity) was the runner-up.

A fourth season premiered on 21 May 2025 and finished on 29 July 2025. At the finale of the fourth season, the Sufganiyah (actress Dana Ivgy) was declared the winner while the Poodle (actress Mali Levy) was the runner-up.

A fifth season premiered on 17 October 2026.

== Panelists and host ==
The show is hosted by television presenter Ido Rosenblum, with the judging panel consisting of journalist Ofira Asayag (season 1-), comedian Shahar Hason (season 1-), actress and model Bar Refaeli (season 5-), singer Moshe Peretz (season 5-), and director Tzedi Tzarfati (season 1-) and musical duo Static & Ben El Tavori (season 1-4).

== Series overview ==
Season	Number of		Duration		Finalists			Host	Panelists (in order of appearance on panel desk from l-r)				
Season	Contestants	Episodes	First Aired	Last Aired	Winner	Runner-up	Third place	Host	Panelists (in order of appearance on panel desk from l-r)				
1	14	20	September 23, 2020	December 5, 2020	Tzachi Halevy as "Rooster"	Rinat Gabay as "Dragonfly"	Or Sasson as "Falafel"	Ido Rosenblum	Tzedi Tzarfati	Ofira Asayag	Shahar Hason	Static & Ben El Tavori	
2	18	20	October 16, 2021	December 18, 2021	Shay Gabso as "Gorilla"	Oz Zehavi as "Spaghetti"	Rotem Shefy as "Oats"	Ido Rosenblum	Tzedi Tzarfati	Ofira Asayag	Shahar Hason	Static & Ben El Tavori	
3	18	20	December 17, 2022	February 18, 2023	Yael Elkana as "Spider"	Adi Bity as "Fish"	Assaf Amdursky as "Snail"	Ido Rosenblum	Tzedi Tzarfati	Ofira Asayag	Shahar Hason	Static & Ben El Tavori	
4	19	20	May 21, 2025	July 29, 2025	Dana Ivgy as "Sufganiyah"	Mali Levi as "Poodle"	Maya Dagan as "Butterfly"	Ido Rosenblum	Tzedi Tzarfati	Ofira Asayag	Shahar Hason	Static	
5	19	20	October 17, 2026	TBA	TBA	TBA	TBA	Ido Rosenblum	Tzedi Tzarfati	Ofira Asayag	Shahar Hason	Bar Refaeli	Moshe Peretz

== Season 1 ==
Contestants

Stage name	Celebrity	Occupation	Episodes													
Stage name	Celebrity	Occupation	1	2	3	4/5	6/7	8/9	10	11/12	13/14	15/16	17/18	19	20	
Stage name	Celebrity	Occupation	1	2	3	4/5	6/7	8/9	10	11/12	13/14	15/16	17/18	19	A	B
Rooster	Tzachi Halevy (Note: Tzachi is married to the ninth placer "Stork", news anchor Lucy Aharish.)	Actor	SAFE		WIN		SAFE		RISK	SAFE	SAFE	SAFE	SAFE	SAFE	SAFE	WINNER
Dragonfly	Rinat Gabay	Singer		SAFE		WIN		SAFE	SAFE		SAFE	SAFE	SAFE	SAFE	SAFE	RUNNER-UP
Falafel	Or Sasson	Olympic athlete		SAFE		RISK	SAFE	SAFE	SAFE		SAFE	SAFE	SAFE	SAFE	THIRD	
Dragon	Itzik Cohen	Actor	SAFE		WIN		SAFE		RISK	SAFE	SAFE	SAFE	SAFE	OUT		
Goat	Galit Giat	Actress	SAFE		RISK		SAFE		RISK	SAFE	SAFE	SAFE	OUT			
Stork	Lucy Aharish (Note: Lucy is married to the season’s winner "Rooster", singer and actor Tzachi Halevy.)	News anchor		SAFE		WIN		SAFE	RISK	SAFE	SAFE	OUT				
Pickle	Einat Sarouf	Model	SAFE		WIN		SAFE		RISK	SAFE	OUT					
Popcorn	Orna Datz	Singer		SAFE		RISK		SAFE	RISK	OUT						
Mushroom	Michal Amdursky	Dancer		SAFE		WIN		OUT								
Bull	Izhar Cohen	Singer/Eurovision 1978 Winner	SAFE		RISK		OUT									
Shark	Dvir Benedek	Actor		SAFE		OUT										
Bear	Gadi Sukenik	Journalist	SAFE		OUT											
Cactus	Yinon Magal	Journalist		OUT												
Krembo	Tal Friedman	Comedian	OUT													

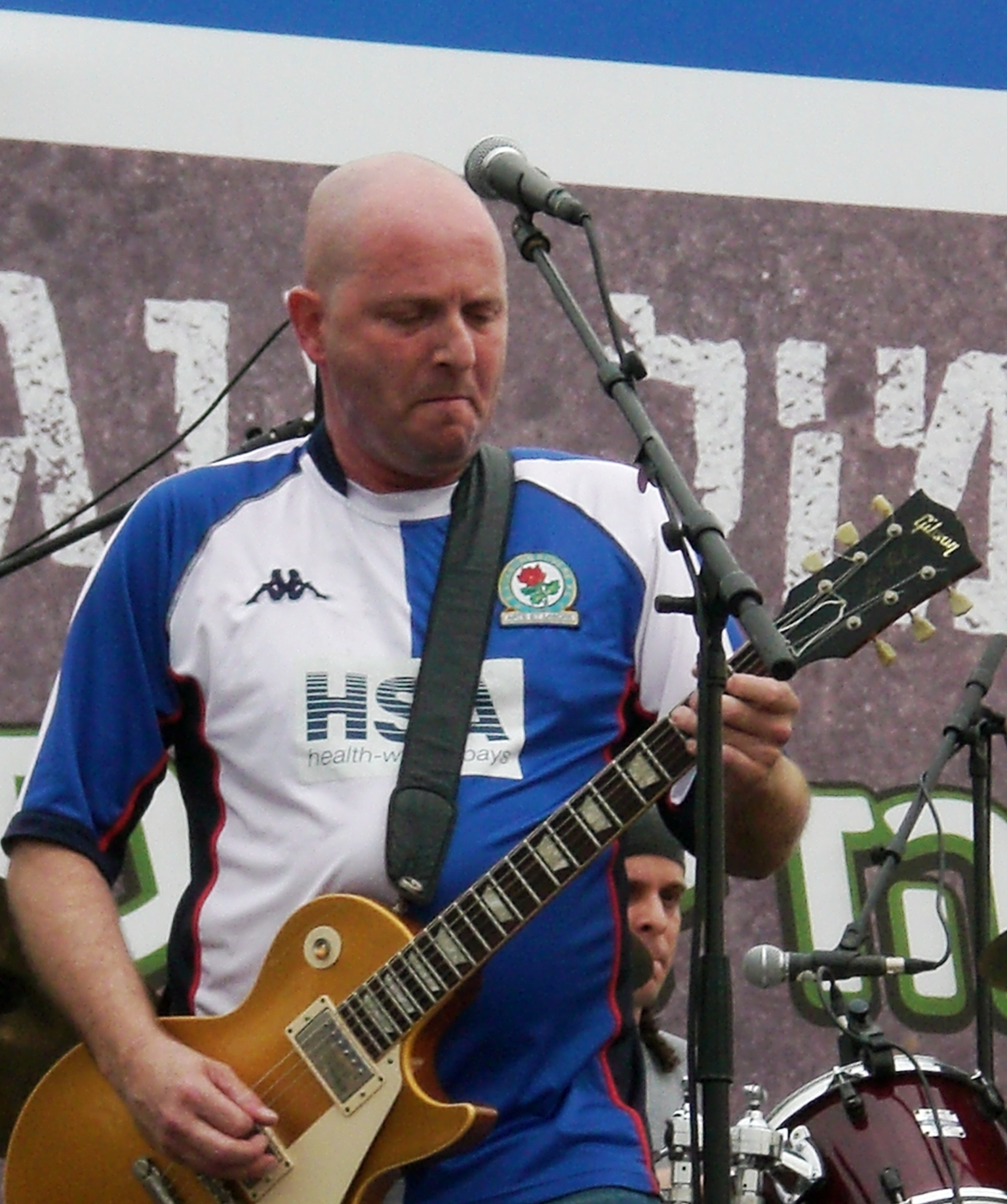
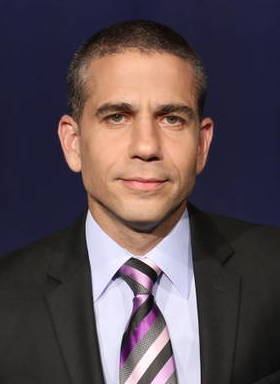
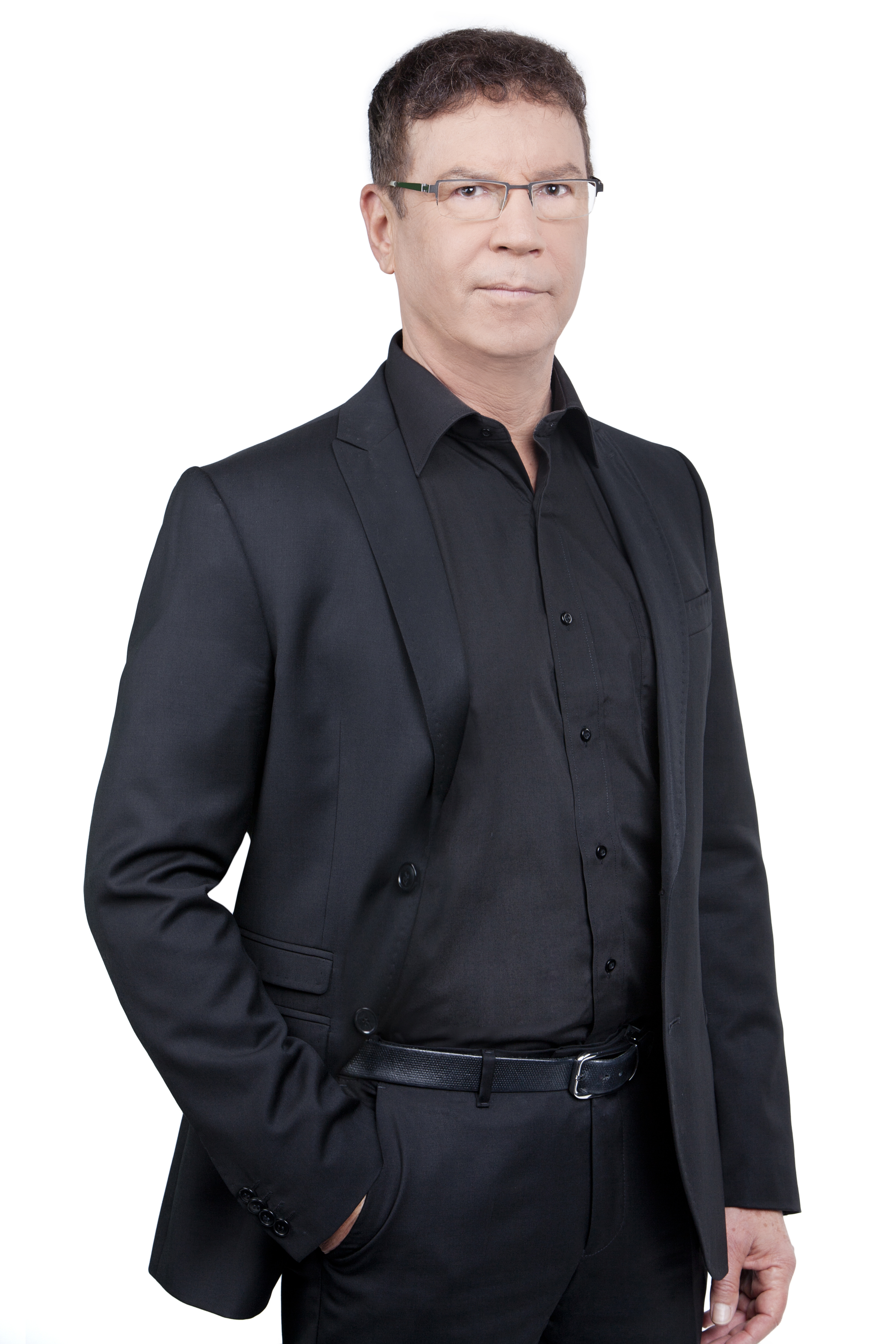
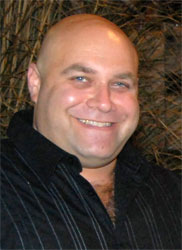
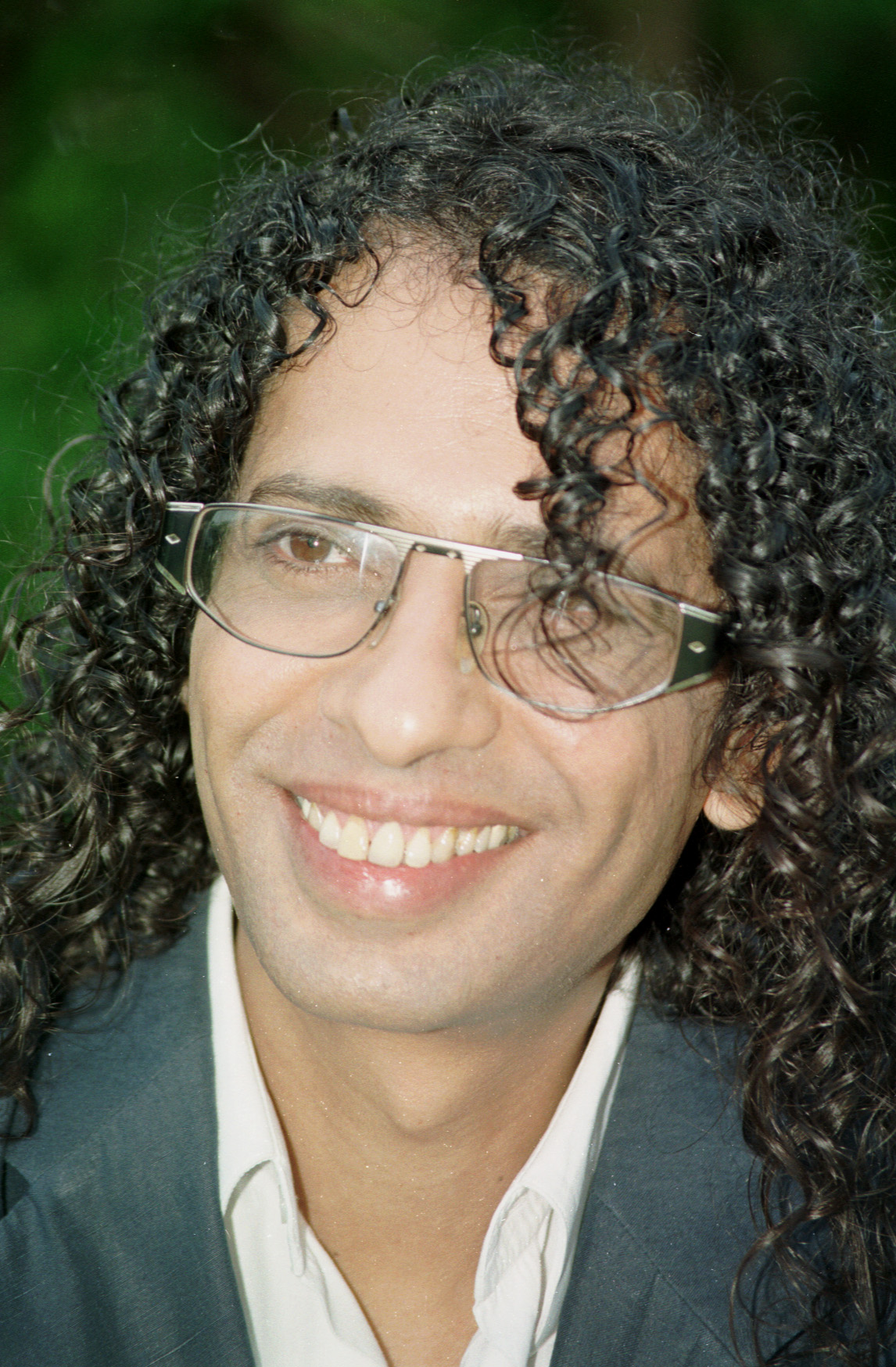
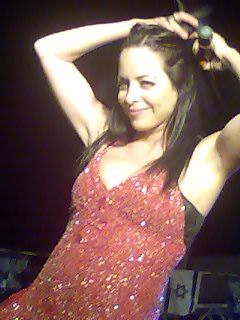
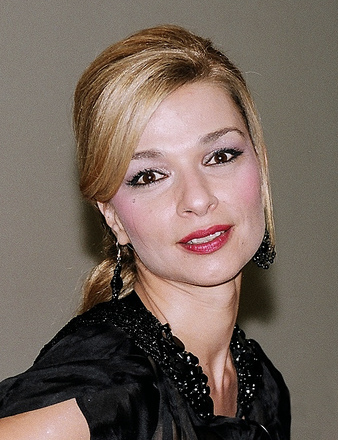
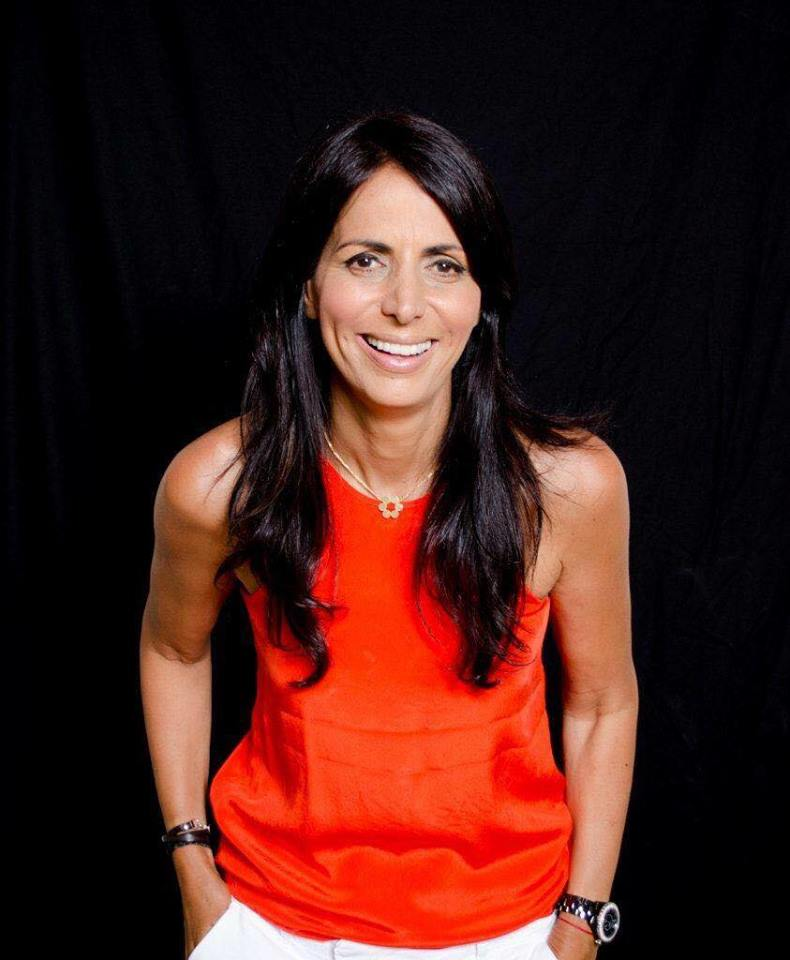
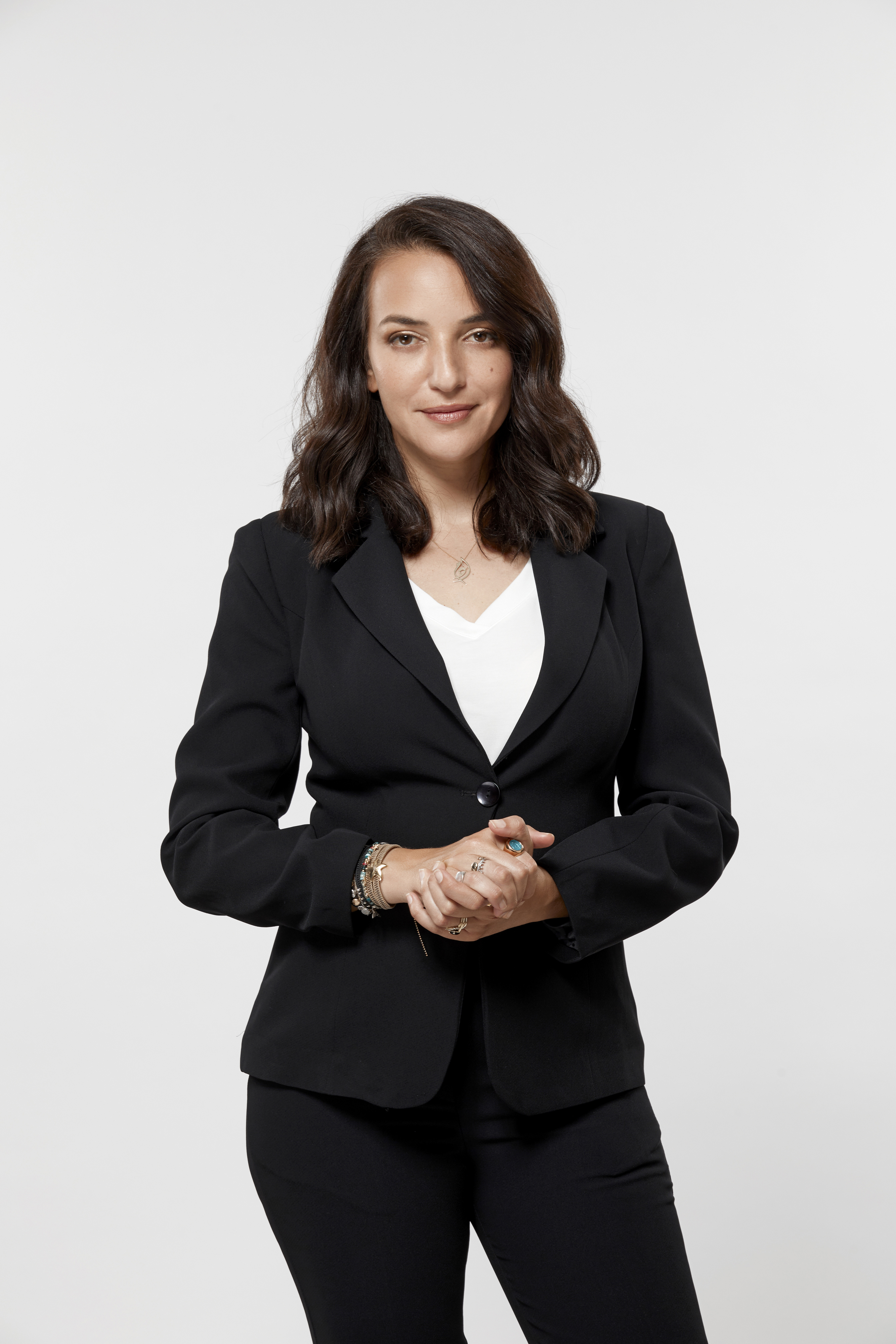
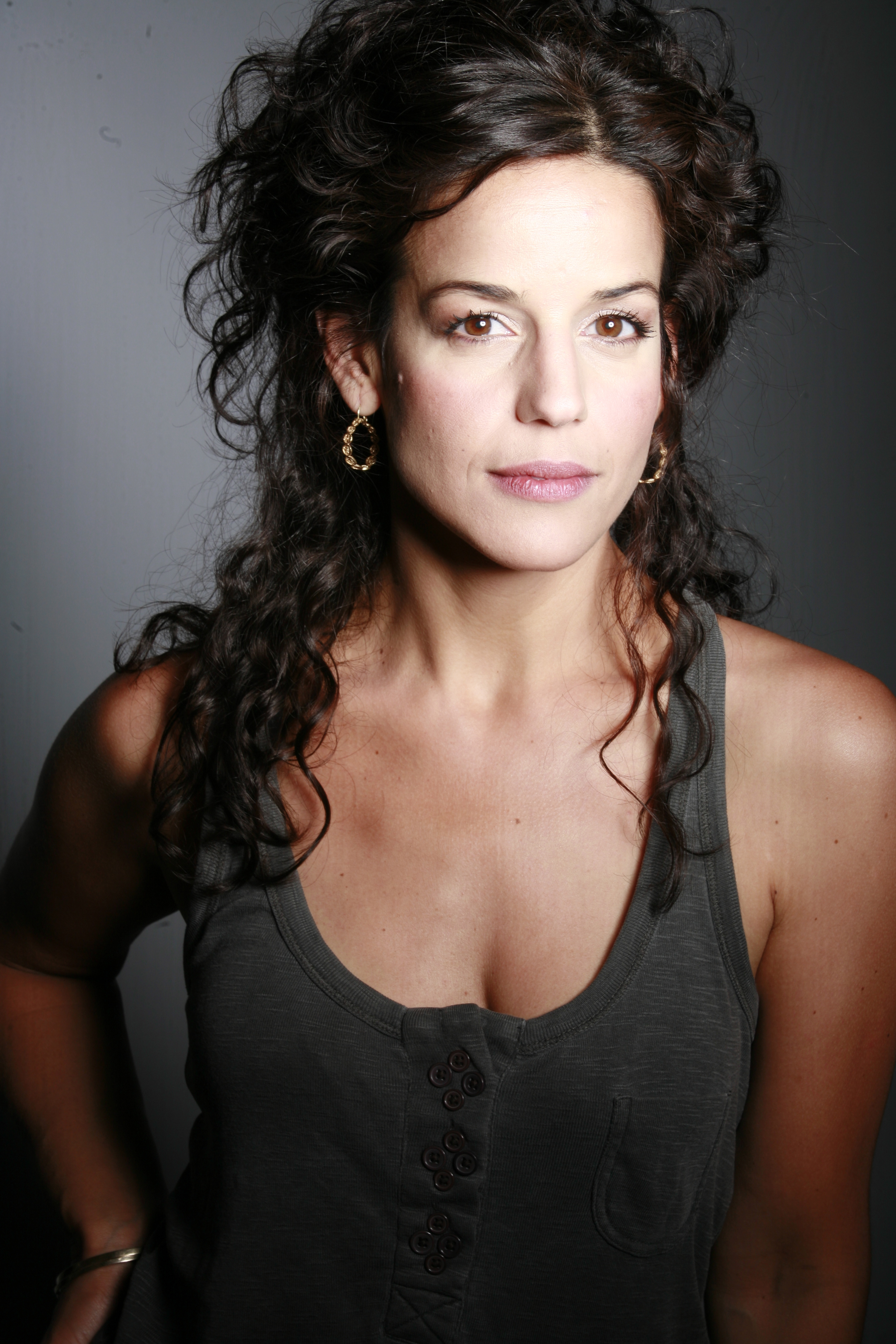
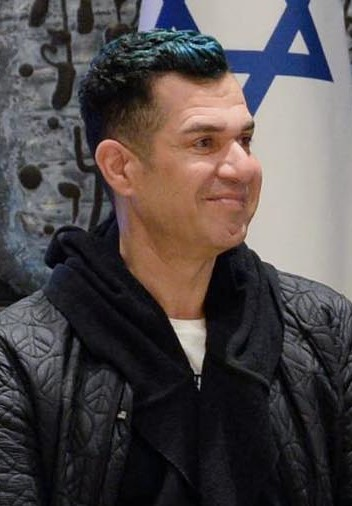
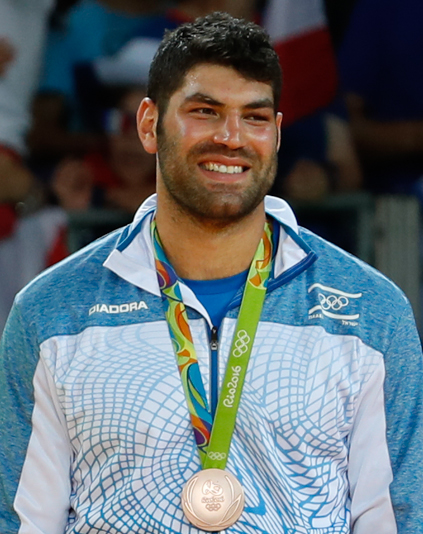
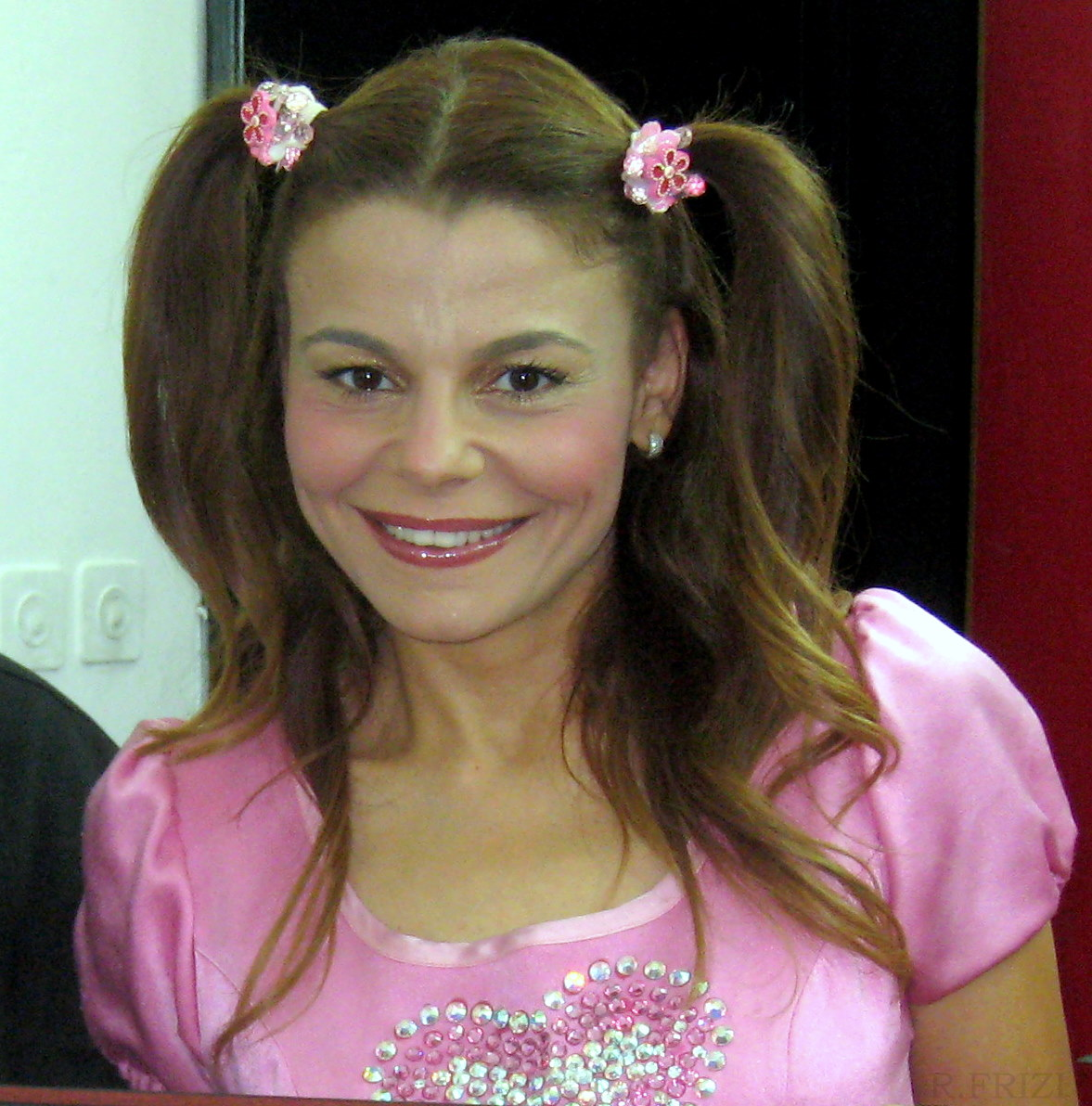
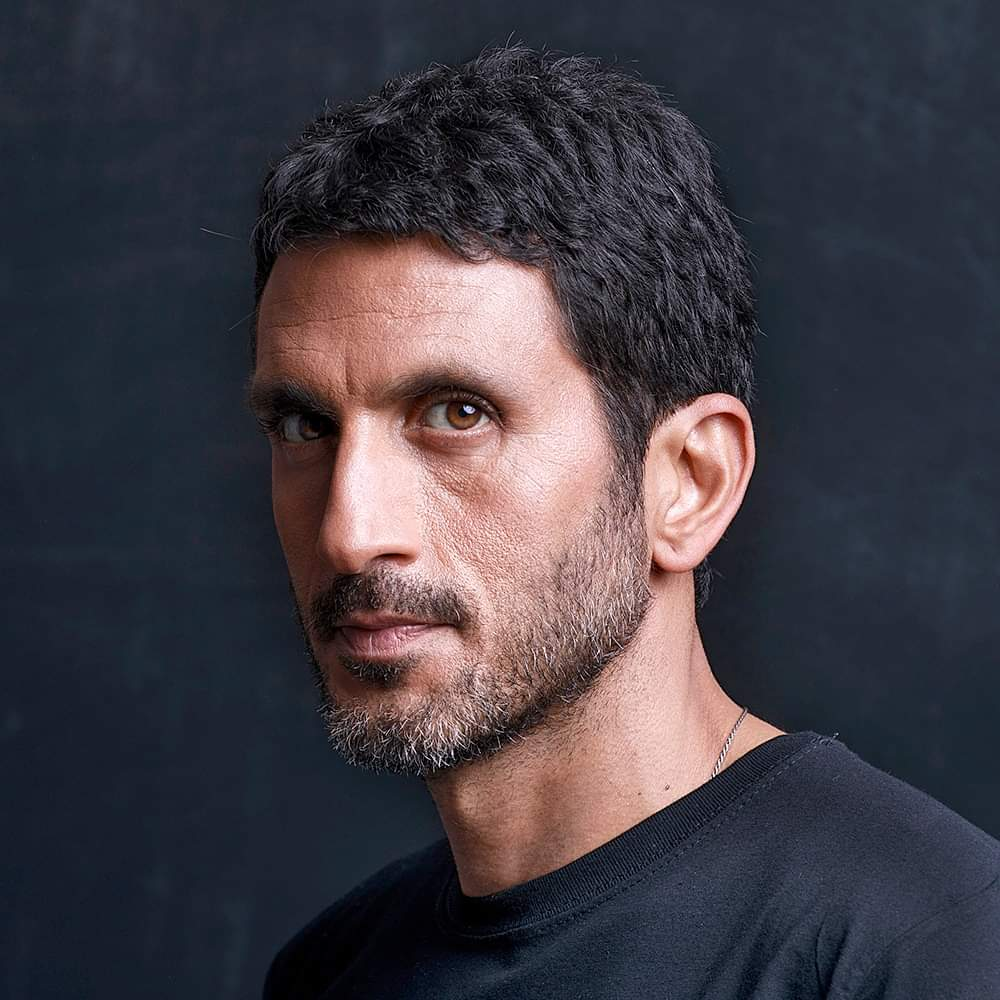
The celebrities who competed in the first season of The Singer in the Mask, pictured in order of elimination (l-r):
Tal Friedman ("Krembo"), Yinon Magal ("Cactus"), Gadi Sukenik ("Bear"), Dvir Benedek ("Shark"), Izhar Cohen ("Bull"), Michal Amdursky ("Mushroom"), Orna Datz ("Popcorn"), Einat Sarouf ("Pickle"), Lucy Aharish ("Stork"), Galit Giat ("Capra"), Itzik Cohen ("Dragon"), Or Sasson ("Falafel"), Rinat Gabay ("Dragonfly"), Tzachi Halevy ("Rooster").

Episodes

=== Week 1 (September 23) ===
Performances on the first episode
#	Stage name	Song	Identity	Result
1	Rooster	"Let Me Entertain You" by Robbie Williams	undisclosed	SAFE
2	Dragon	"Creep" by Radiohead	undisclosed	SAFE
3	Bull	"Stay With Me" by Sam Smith	undisclosed	SAFE
4	Goat	"מיליון דולר” by Noa Kirel feat. Shahar Saul	undisclosed	SAFE
5	Pickle	"Mr. Lonely" by Bobby Vinton	undisclosed	SAFE
6	Bear	"I'm Too Sexy" by Right Said Fred	undisclosed	SAFE
7	Krembo	"All of Me" by John Legend	Tal Friedman	OUT

=== Week 2 (September 29) ===
Performances on the second episode
#	Stage name	Song	Identity	Result
1	Dragonfly	"Symphony" by Clean Bandit feat. Zara Larsson	undisclosed	SAFE
2	Cactus	“שמתי אבקה” by Eviatar Banai	Inon Magal	OUT
3	Shark	“טמפרטורה” by Omer Adam feat. Richie Loop	undisclosed	SAFE
4	Mushroom	"Hallelujah" by Alicia Keys	undisclosed	SAFE
5	Falafel	"שממה" by Uri Ben-Ari	undisclosed	SAFE
6	Stork	"חזור הביתה" by Ishay Ribo	undisclosed	SAFE
7	Popcorn	"Fuego" by Eleni Foureira	undisclosed	SAFE

=== Week 3 (October 1) ===
Performances on the third episode
#	Stage name	Song	Identity	Result
1	Goat	"I'm Every Woman" by Chaka Khan	undisclosed	RISK
2	Rooster	"צליל מחרוזת" by Eyal Golan	undisclosed	WIN
3	Bull	"ב. מ. וו שחור" by Ethnix	undisclosed	RISK
4	Dragon	"Circle of Life" by Elton John	undisclosed	WIN
5	Bear	"Piano Man" by Billy Joel	Gadi Sukenik	OUT
6	Pickle	"Havana" by Camila Cabello feat. Young Thug	undisclosed	WIN

=== Week 4 (October 4/5) ===
Performances on the fourth and fifth episode
Ep.	#	Stage name	Song	Identity	Result
4	1	Falafel	"מסע" by Eliad Nachum	undisclosed	RISK
4	2	Dragonfly	"Toxic" by Britney Spears	undisclosed	WIN
4	3	Shark	"Can't Stop the Feeling" by Justin Timberlake	Dvir Benedek	OUT
4	4	Stork	"שיר ללא שם" by Shalom Hanoch	undisclosed	WIN
5	5	Mushroom	"Ready to Go" by Republica	undisclosed	WIN
5	6	Popcorn	"Stay" by Rihanna feat. Mikky Ekko	undisclosed	RISK

=== Week 5 (October 12/13) ===
Performances on the sixth and seventh episode
Ep.	#	Stage name	Song	Identity	Result
6	1	Goat	"Nothing Compares 2 U" by Sinéad O'Connor	undisclosed	SAFE
6	2	Pickle	"All About That Bass" by Meghan Trainor	undisclosed	SAFE
6	3	Dragon	"ויקיפדיה" by Hanan Ben Ari	undisclosed	SAFE
7	4	Bull	"Stitches" by Shawn Mendes	Izhar Cohen	OUT
7	5	Rooster	"Halo" by Beyoncé	undisclosed	SAFE

=== Week 6 (October 18/19) ===
Performances on the eighth and ninth episode
Ep.	#	Stage name	Song	Identity	Result
8	1	Dragonfly	"That I Would Be Good" by Alanis Morissette	undisclosed	SAFE
8	2	Stork	"I Want to Break Free" by Queen	undisclosed	SAFE
8	3	Falafel	"Cold Little Heart" by Michael Kiwanuka	undisclosed	SAFE
9	4	Popcorn	"זוט אני" by Ella-Lee Lahav	undisclosed	SAFE
9	5	Mushroom	"Shallow" by Lady Gaga and Bradley Cooper	Michal Amdursky	OUT

=== Week 7 (October 26) ===
Performances on the tenth episode
#	Stage name	Song	Identity	Result
1	Pickle	"Good as Hell" by Lizzo	undisclosed	RISK
2	Rooster	"Disco Here Again" by The Spurs	undisclosed	RISK
3	Dragonfly	"חינם" by Sarit Hadad	undisclosed	SAFE
4	Falafel	"הכי קרוב אליך" by Eli Butner feat. Aviv Alush	undisclosed	SAFE
5	Popcorn	"Nothing Breaks Like a Heart" by Mark Ronson feat. Miley Cyrus	undisclosed	RISK
6	Goat	"Love Boy" by Dana International	undisclosed	RISK
7	Stork	"אבסורד" by Shlomo Artzi	undisclosed	RISK
8	Dragon	"אולי על חוף הים" by Yehoram Gaon	undisclosed	RISK

=== Week 8 (November 1/2) ===
Performances on the eleventh/twelfth episode
Ep.	#	Stage name	Song	Identity	Result
11	1	Goat	"No Roots" by Alice Merton	undisclosed	SAFE
11	2	Dragon	"(Simply) The Best" by Tina Turner feat. Jimmy Barnes	undisclosed	SAFE
11	3	Stork	"Runnin' (Lose It All)" by Naughty Boy feat. Beyoncé and Arrow Benjamin	undisclosed	SAFE
11	4	Popcorn	"Like a Prayer" by Madonna	Orna Datz	OUT
12	5	Rooster	"Greased Lightning" by John Travolta	undisclosed	SAFE
12	6	Pickle	"The End of the World" by Skeeter Davis	undisclosed	SAFE

=== Week 9 (November 8/9) ===
Performances on the thirteenth/fourteenth episode
Ep.	#	Stage name	Song	Identity	Result
13	1	Goat	"ריקוד" by Anya Buxtein and Offer Nissim	undisclosed	SAFE
13	2	Dragon	"I Don't Want to Miss a Thing" by Aerosmith	undisclosed	SAFE
13	3	Falafel	"אחרי כל השנים האלה" by Omer Adam	undisclosed	SAFE
13	4	Pickle	"Sweet Dreams (Are Made of This)" by Eurythmics	Einat Sarouf	OUT
14	5	Rooster	"Wrecking Ball" by Miley Cyrus	undisclosed	SAFE
14	6	Dragonfly	"Stand by Me" by Ben E. King	undisclosed	SAFE
14	7	Stork	"I Wanna Dance with Somebody (Who Loves Me)" by Whitney Houston	undisclosed	SAFE

=== Week 10 (November 15/16) ===
Performances on the fifteenth/sixteenth episode
Ep.	#	Stage name	Song	Identity	Result
15	1	Stork	"תל אביב בלילה" by Eden Ben Zaken	Lucy Aharish	OUT
15	2	Falafel	"Human" by Rag'n'Bone Man	undisclosed	SAFE
15	3	Goat	"ללמוד ללכת" by Nasrin Kadri	undisclosed	SAFE
15	4	Rooster	"הכל לטובה" by Static & Ben El Tavori	undisclosed	SAFE
16	5	Dragon	"Bad Romance" by Lady Gaga	undisclosed	SAFE
16	6	Dragonfly	"Don't Start Now" by Dua Lipa	undisclosed	SAFE

=== Week 11 (November 21/22) ===
Performances on the seventeenth/eighteenth episode
Ep.	#	Stage name	Song	Identity	Result
17	1	Dragon	"It's My Life" by Bon Jovi	undisclosed	SAFE
17	2	Rooster	"Impossible" by Shontelle	undisclosed	SAFE
17	3	Falafel	"אור גדול" by Amir Dadon	undisclosed	SAFE
18	4	Dragonfly	"Firework" by Katy Perry	undisclosed	SAFE
18	5	Goat	"עכשיו אתה חוזר" by Miri Mesika	Galit Giat	OUT

=== Week 12 - Semifinal (November 28) ===
Performances on the nineteenth episode
#	Stage name	Song	Identity	Result
1	Dragon	"The Show Must Go On" by Queen	Itzik Cohen	OUT
2	Falafel	"I'd Do Anything for Love (But I Won't Do That)" by Meat Loaf	undisclosed	SAFE
3	Dragonfly	"Euphoria" by Loreen	undisclosed	SAFE
4	Rooster	"כולם רוקדים עכשיו" by Hi-Five	undisclosed	SAFE

=== Week 13 - Final (December 5) ===
Performances on the final episode
#	Stage name	Song	Identity	Result
Round One
1	Rooster	"Don't Stop Me Now" by Queen	undisclosed	SAFE
2	Dragonfly	"Where Have You Been" by Rihanna	undisclosed	SAFE
3	Falafel	"7 Years" by Lukas Graham	Or Sasson	THIRD
Round Two
1	Dragonfly	"All by Myself" by Eric Carmen	Rinat Gabay	RUNNER-UP
2	Rooster	"Alive" by Sia	Tzachi Halevy	WINNER

== Season 2 ==
Contestants

Stage Name	Celebrity	Occupation	Episodes																			
Stage Name	Celebrity	Occupation	1	2	3	4	5	6	7	8	9	10	11	12	13/14	15	16	17	18	19	20	
Stage Name	Celebrity	Occupation	Group A			Group B			Group C			A	B	C	13/14	15	16	17	18	19	A	B
Gorilla	Shay Gabso	Singer				SAFE	WIN	SAFE					SAFE		SAFE	SAFE			SAFE	SAFE	SAFE	WINNER
Spaghetti	Oz Zehavi	Actor							SAFE	WIN	SAFE			SAFE	SAFE		SAFE	SAFE		SAFE	SAFE	RUNNER-UP
Oats	Rotem Shefy	Singer	SAFE	WIN	SAFE							SAFE			SAFE		SAFE	SAFE		SAFE	THIRD	
Schnauzer	Nadav Abuksis	Comedian							SAFE	RISK	SAFE			SAFE	SAFE	SAFE			SAFE	OUT		
Oyster	Netta Garti	Actress	SAFE	RISK	SAFE							SAFE			SAFE	SAFE			OUT			
Chameleon	Maor Buzaglo	Footballer				SAFE	RISK	SAFE					SAFE		SAFE		SAFE	OUT				
Horse	Moshe Datz	Singer				SAFE	RISK	SAFE					SAFE		SAFE		OUT					
Fox	Hanny Nahmias	Singer							SAFE	RISK	SAFE			SAFE	SAFE	OUT						
Octopus	Haim Cohen	Chef	SAFE	WIN	SAFE							SAFE			OUT							
Beetle	Stav Shaffir	Politician							SAFE	WIN	SAFE			OUT								
Babushka	Tahounia Rubel	Model				SAFE	WIN	SAFE					OUT									
Rugelach	Moshik Afia	Singer	SAFE	WIN	SAFE							OUT										
Chili	Kevin Rubin	Actor							SAFE	WIN	OUT											
Hedgehog	Nehemia Shtrasler	Journalist							SAFE	OUT												
Strawberry	Sandra Sade	Actress				SAFE	WIN	OUT														
Pea	Itamar Grotto	Doctor				SAFE	OUT															
Gazelle	Ron Shahar	Actor	SAFE	RISK	OUT																	
Parrot	Shahar Pe'er	Tennis player	SAFE	OUT																		

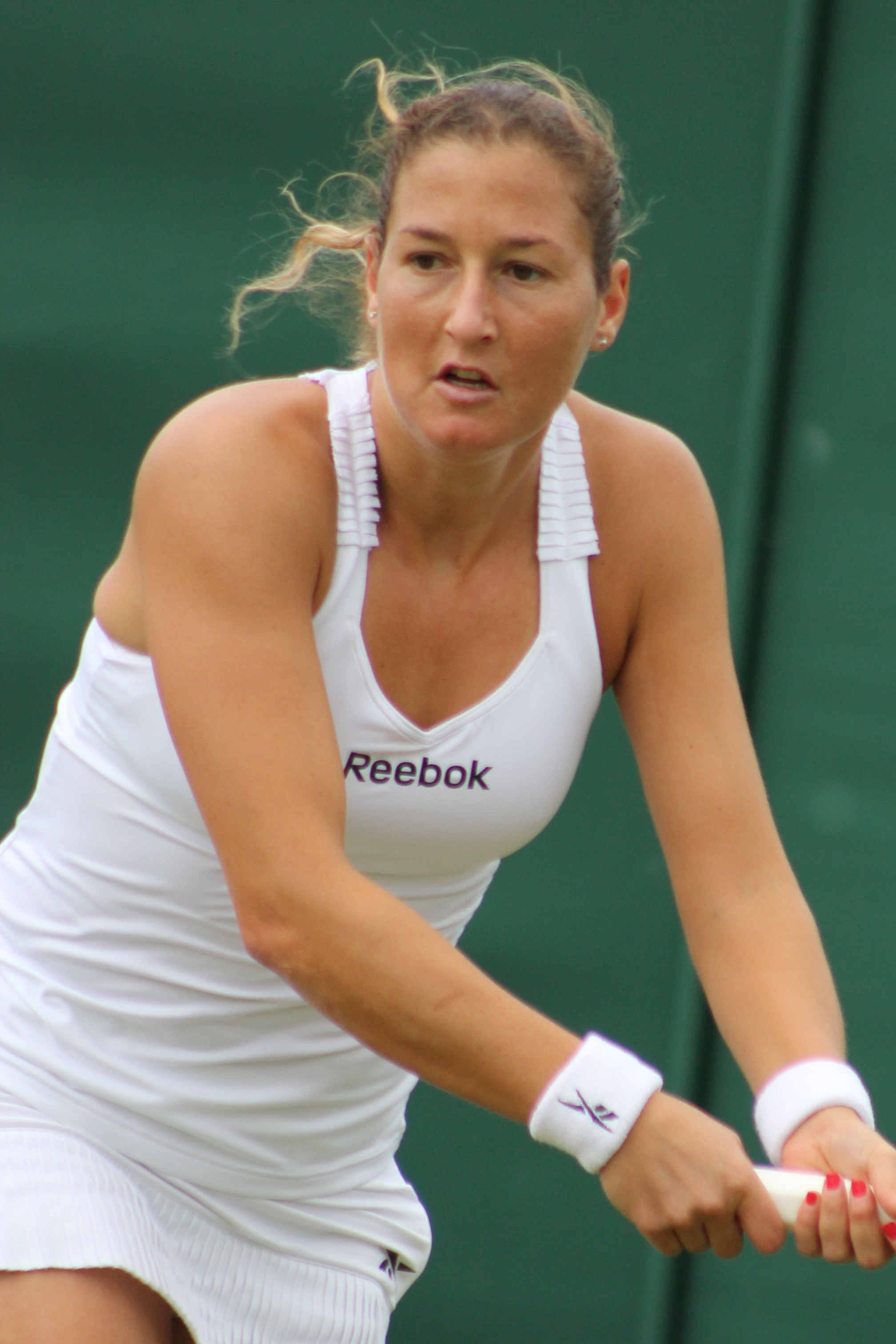
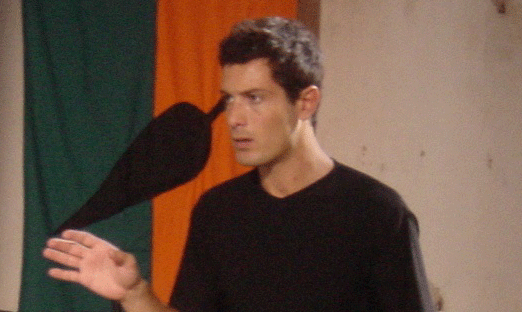
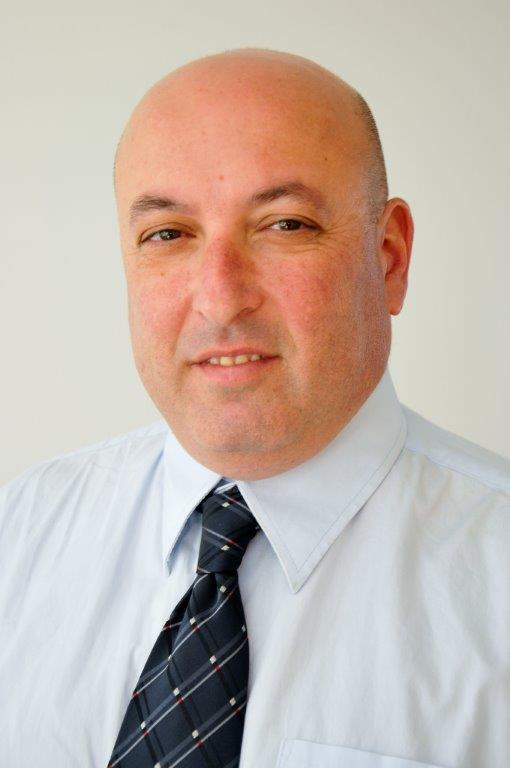
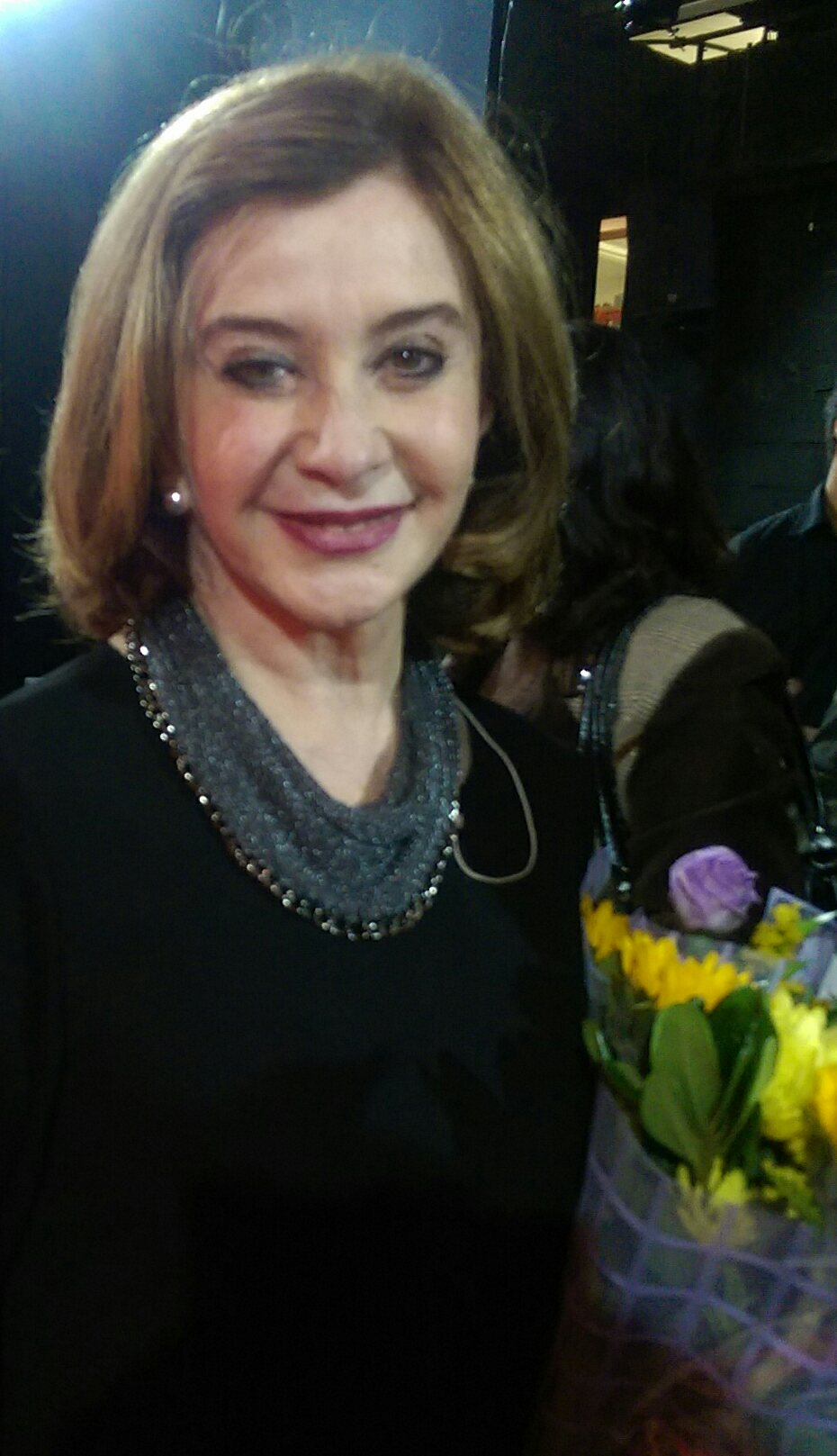
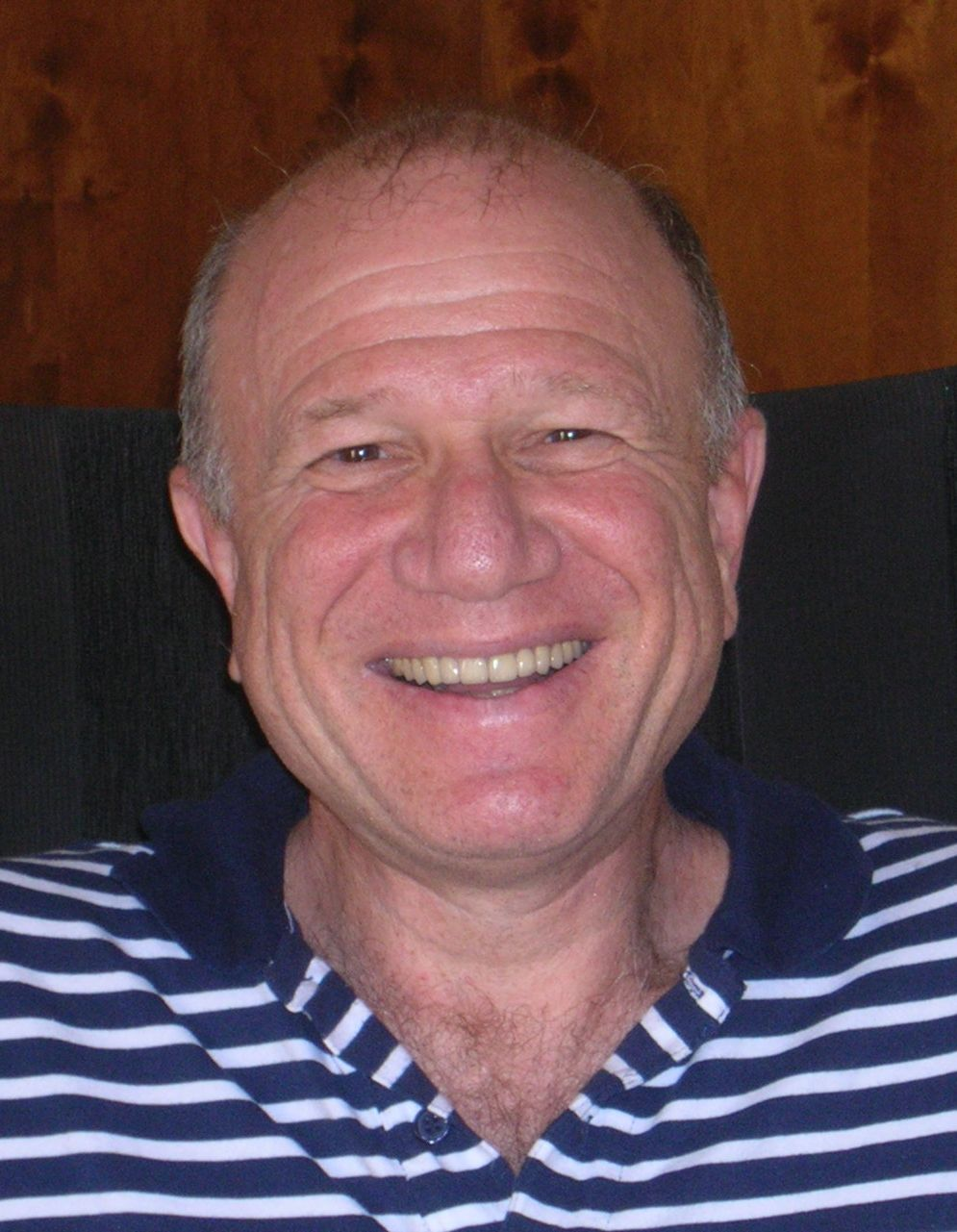
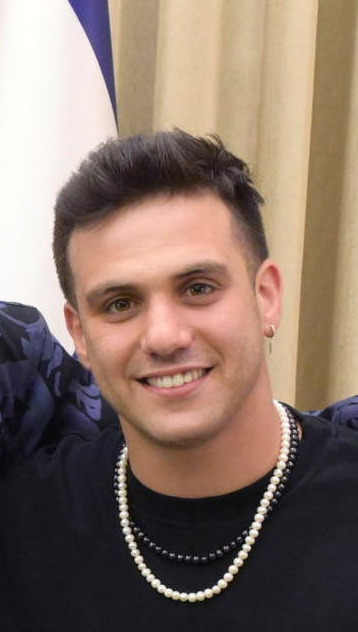
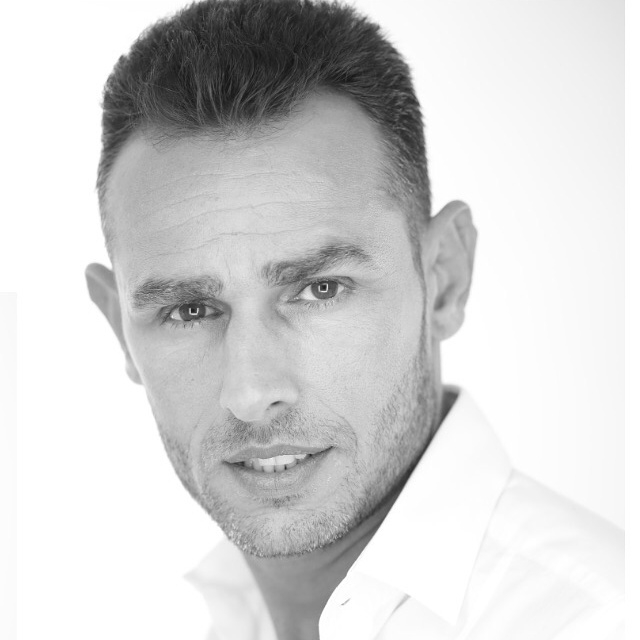
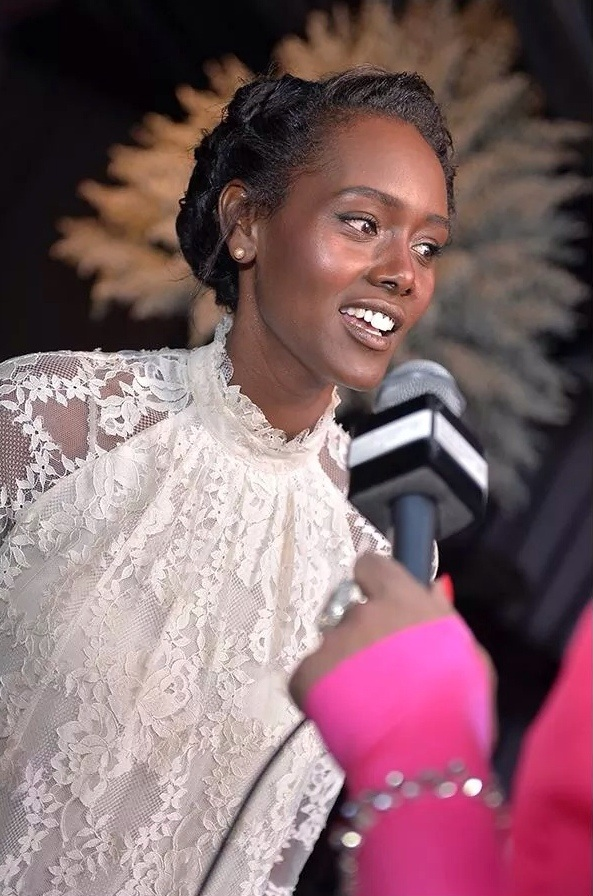
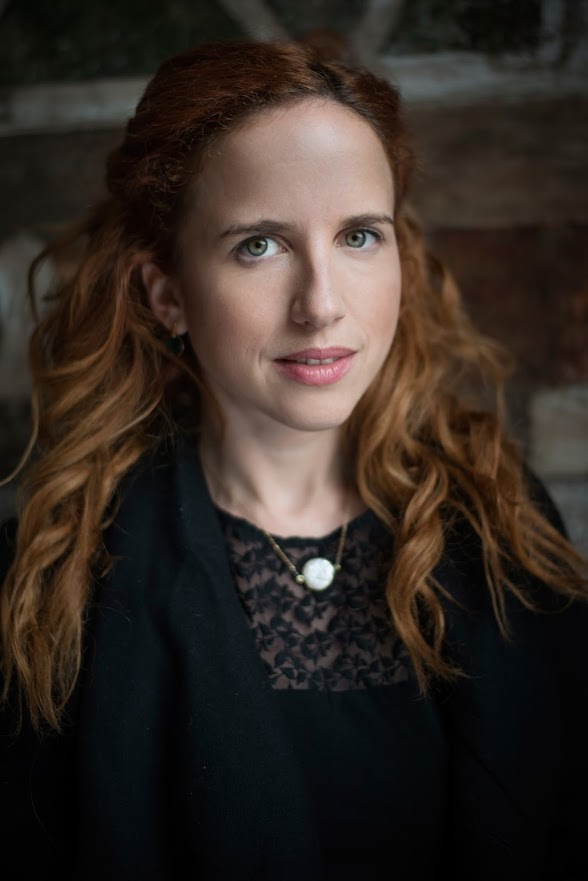
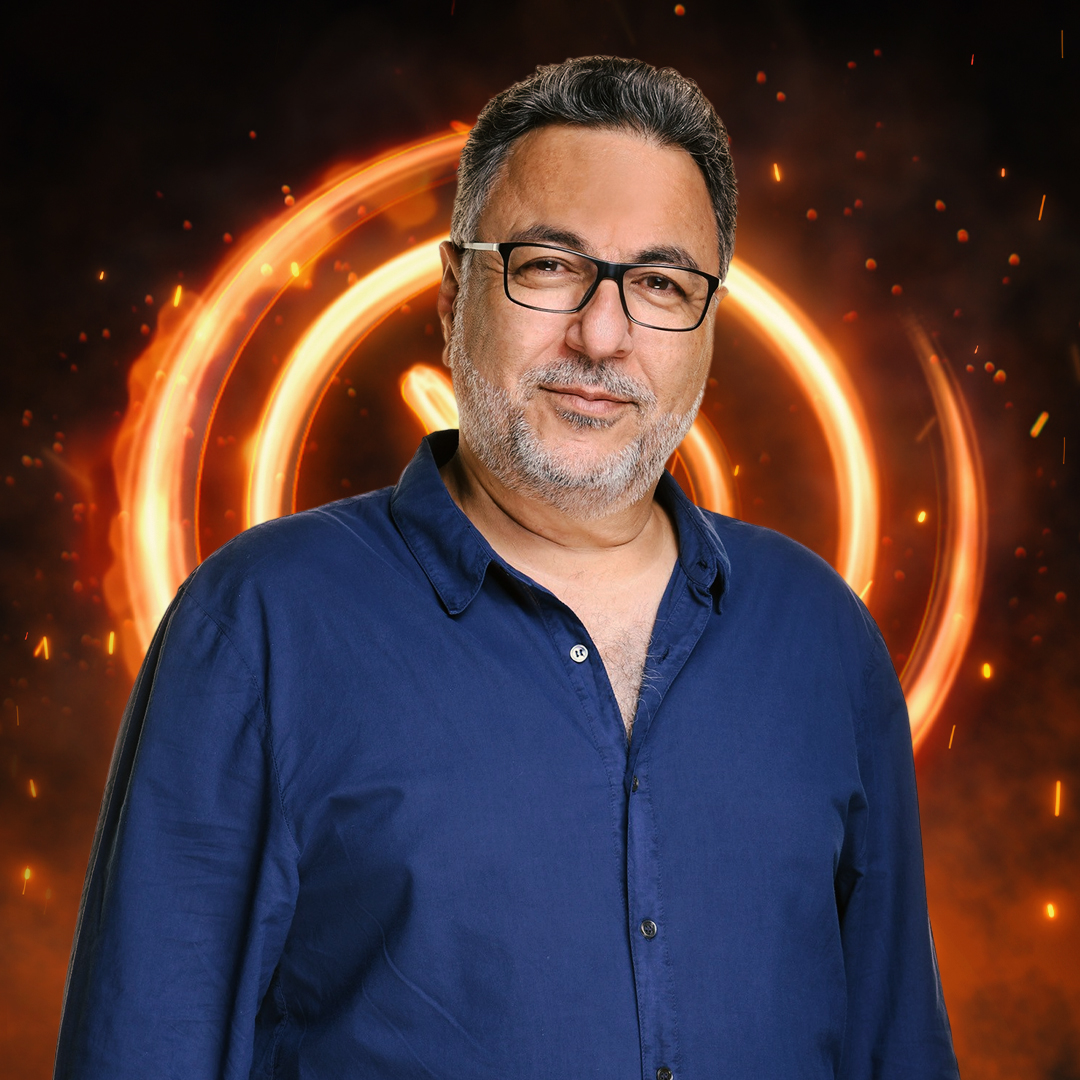
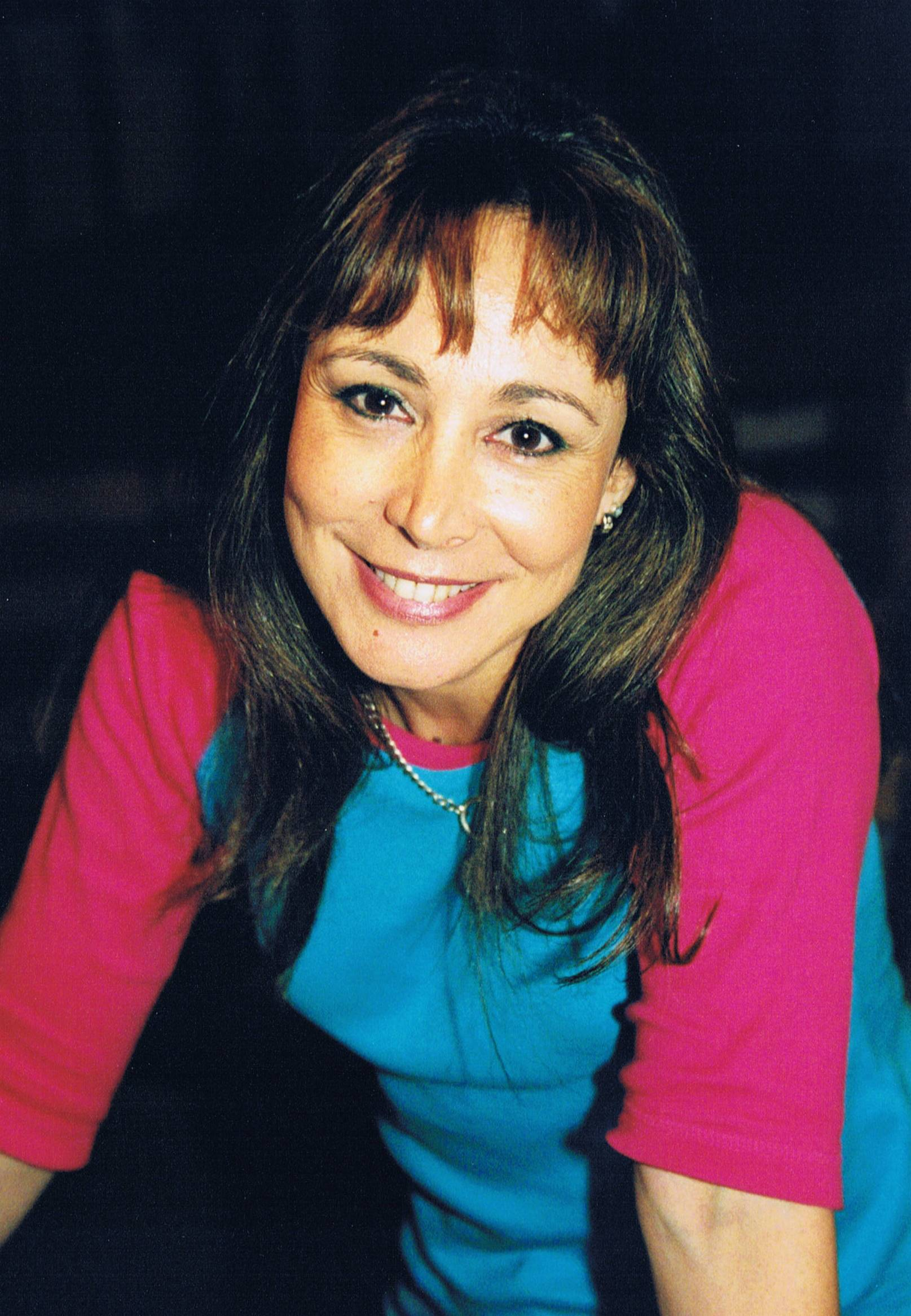
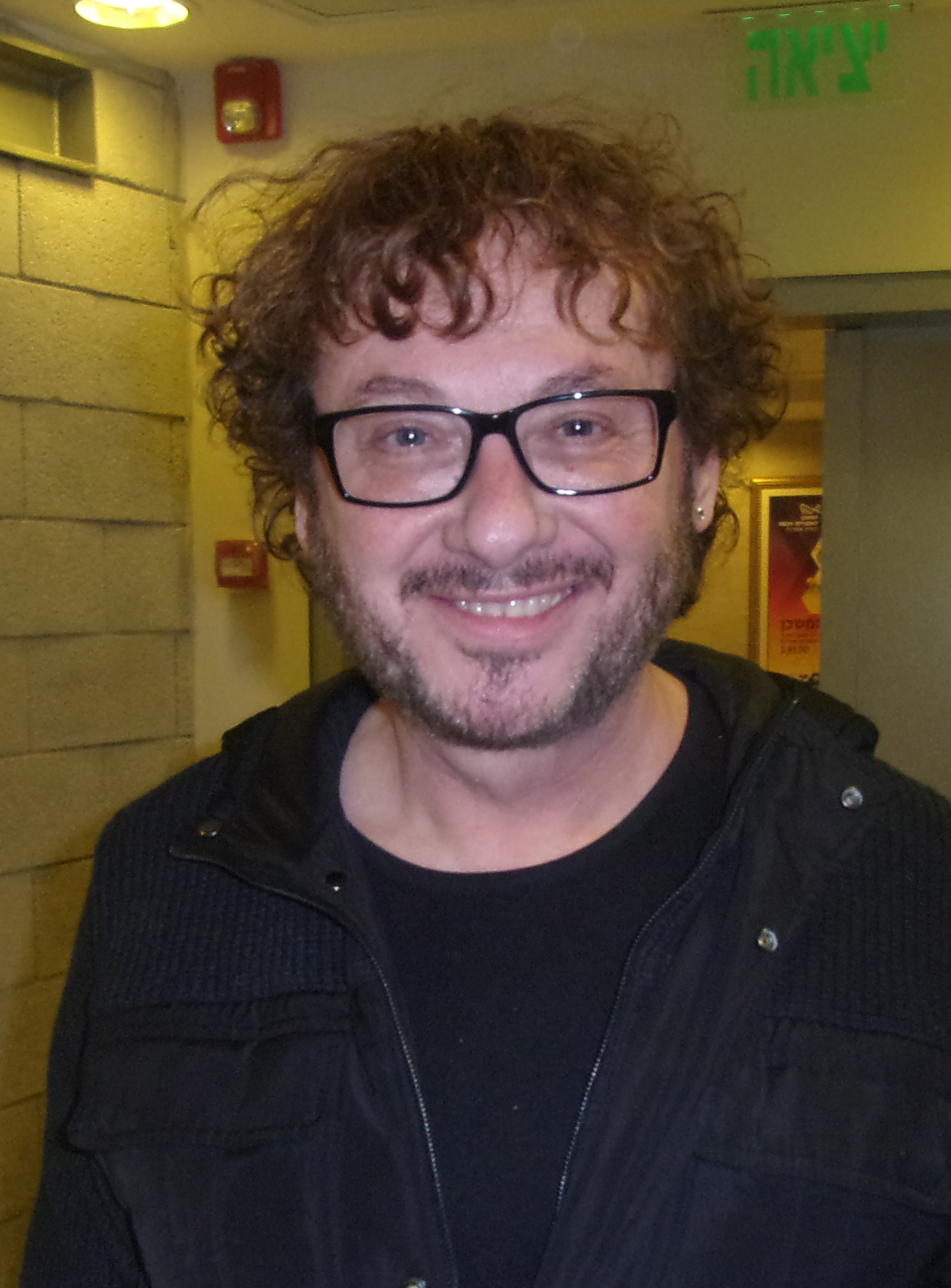
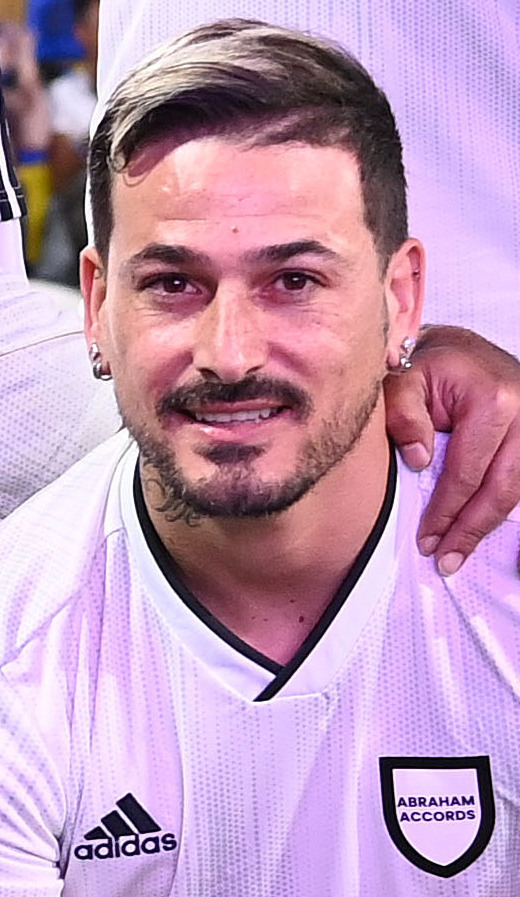
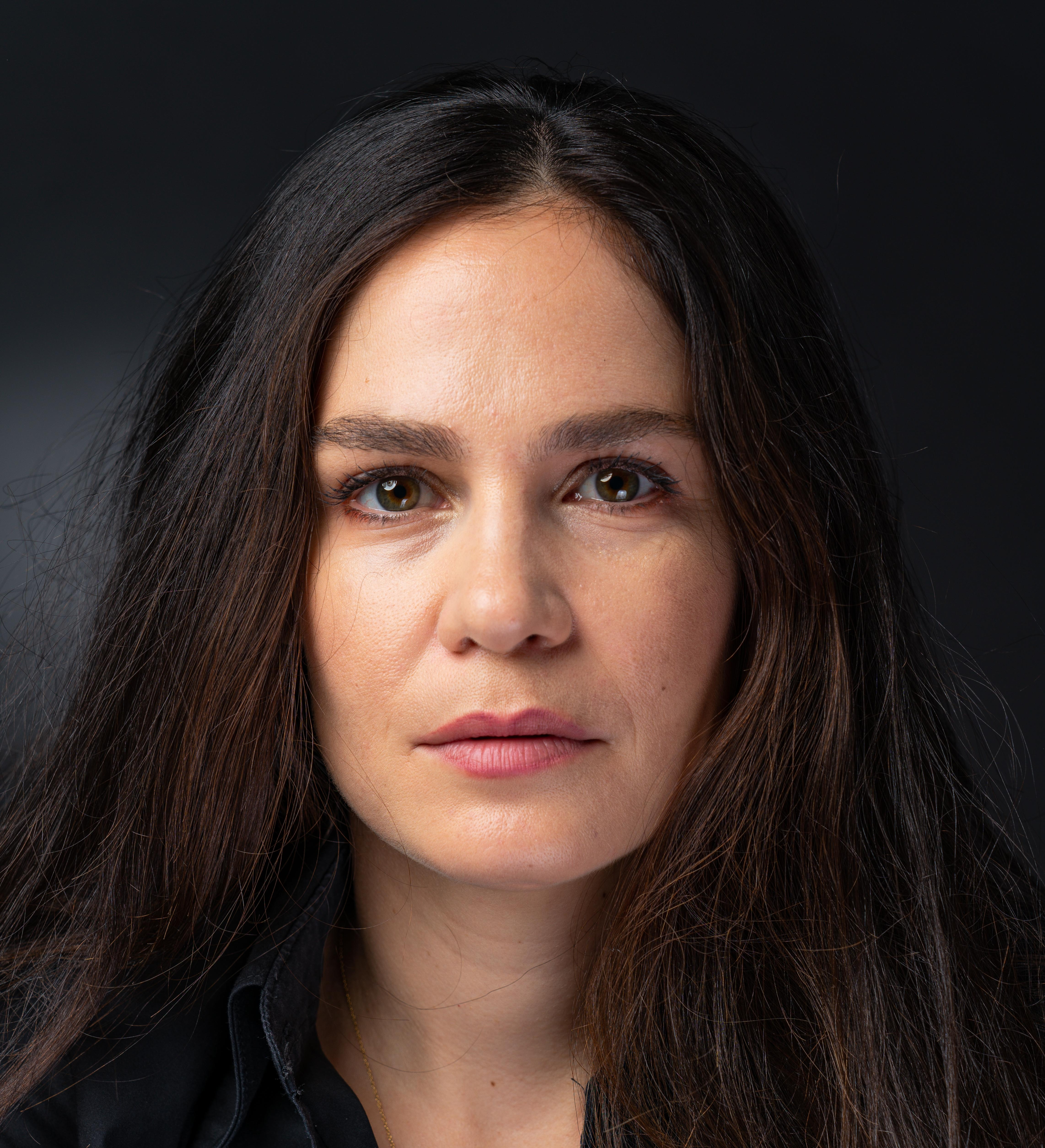
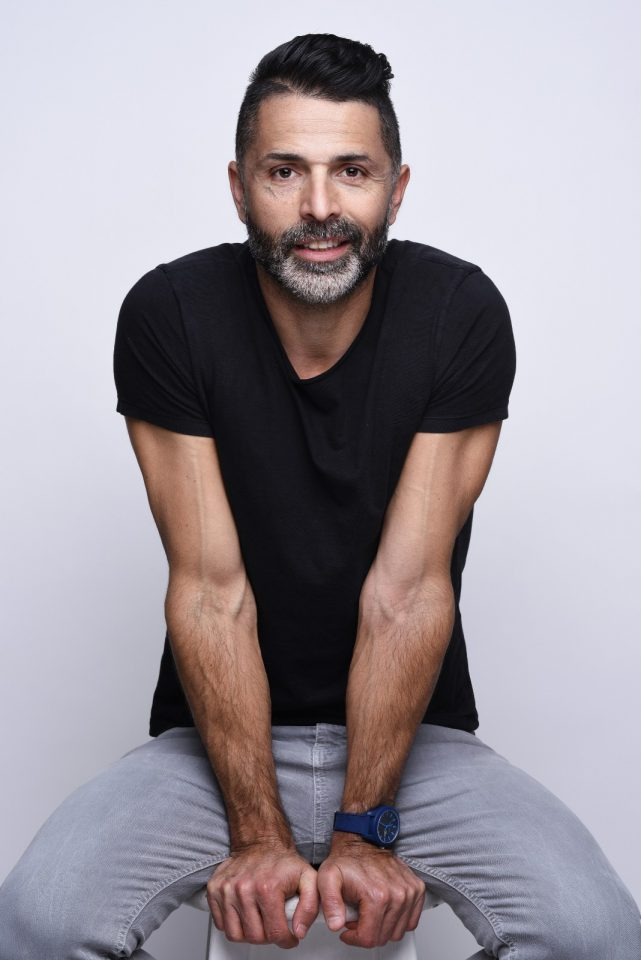
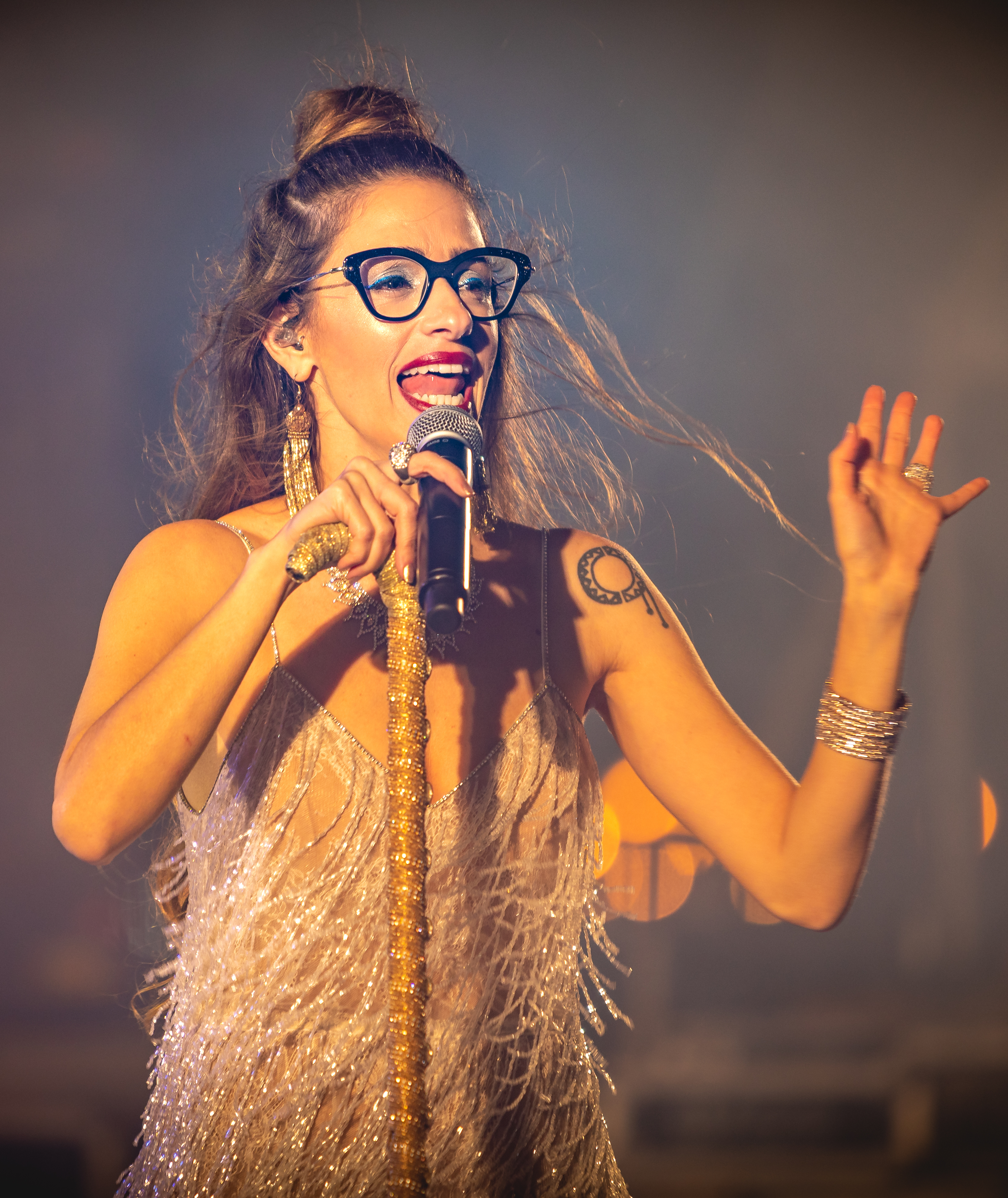
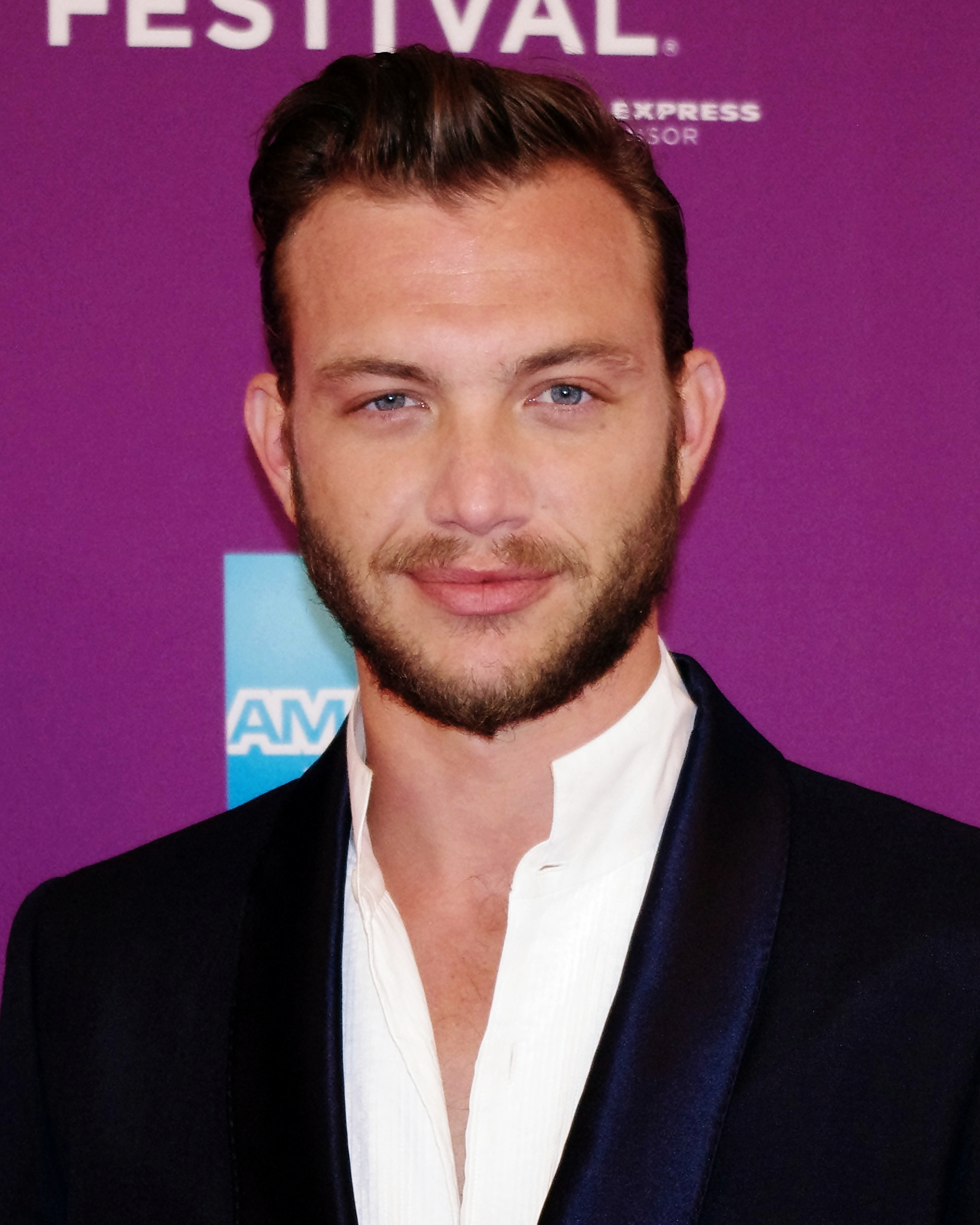
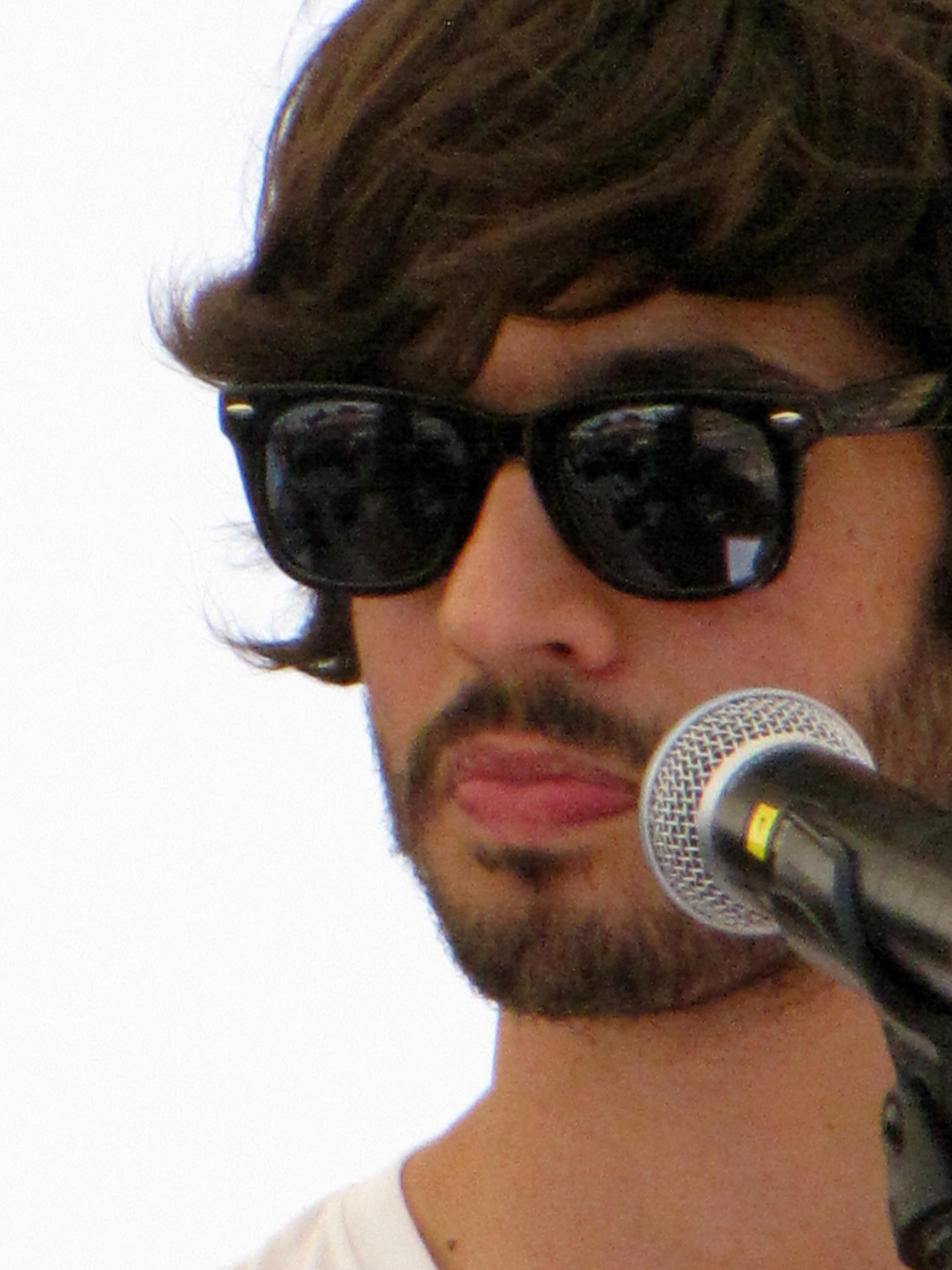
The celebrities who competed in the second season of The Singer in the Mask, pictured in order of elimination (l-r):
Shahar Pe'er ("Parrot"), Ron Shahar ("Gazelle"), Itamar Grotto ("Pea"), Sandra Sade ("Strawberry"), Nehemia Shtrasler ("Hedgehog"), Kevin Rubin ("Chilli"), Moshik Afia ("Rugelach"), Tahounia Rubel ("Babushka"), Stav Shaffir ("Ladybug"), Haim Cohen ("Octopus"), Hanny Nahmias ("Fox"), Moshe Datz ("Horse"), Maor Buzaglo ("Chameleon"), Netta Garti ("Oyster"), Nadav Abuksis ("Schnauzer"), Rotem Shefy ("Oats"), Oz Zehavi ("Spaghetti"), Shay Gabso ("Gorilla"),

Episodes

=== Week 1 (October 16/17/18) (Note: The voting took place in episode 2 as the contestants have all performed. Additional voting for the other five masks of the group took place in episode 3 after all contestants have performed.) ===
Performances on the first episode
#	Stage name	Song	Identity	Result
1	Oyster	"Break My Heart" by Dua Lipa	undisclosed	SAFE
2	Gazelle	"(You Make Me Feel Like) A Natural Woman" by Aretha Franklin	undisclosed	SAFE
3	Oats	"את תלכי בשדה" by Chava Alberstein	undisclosed	SAFE
4	Rugelach	"Wake Me Up Before You Go-Go" by Wham!	undisclosed	SAFE
5	Octopus	"One Day" by Matisyahu	undisclosed	SAFE
6	Parrot	"טיקיטאס" by Noa Kirel feat. Stéphane Legar	undisclosed	SAFE

Performances on the second episode
#	Stage name	Song	Identity	Result
1	Gazelle	"Freedom! '90" by George Michael	undisclosed	RISK
2	Octopus	"Ego" by Willy William	undisclosed	WIN
3	Rugelach	"Jailhouse Rock" by Elvis Presley	undisclosed	WIN
4	Oyster	"מסיבה" by Jasmin Moallem	undisclosed	RISK
5	Parrot	"I Follow Rivers" by Lykke Li	Shahar Pe'er	OUT
6	Oats	"Side to Side" by Ariana Grande feat. Nicki Minaj	undisclosed	WIN

Performances on the third episode
#	Stage name	Song	Identity	Result
1	Gazelle	"(I've Had) The Time of My Life" by Bill Medley and Jennifer Warnes	Ron Shahar	OUT
2	Oats	"I Have Nothing" by Whitney Houston	undisclosed	SAFE
3	Octopus	"Singin' in the Rain" by Gene Kelly	undisclosed	SAFE
4	Oyster	"California Dreamin'" by The Mamas & the Papas	undisclosed	SAFE
5	Rugelach	"Against All Odds" by Phil Collins	undisclosed	SAFE

=== Week 2 (October 23/25/26) (Note: The voting took place in episode 5 as the contestants have all performed. Additional voting for the other five masks of the group took place in episode 6 after all contestants have performed.) ===
Performances on the fourth episode
#	Stage name	Song	Identity	Result
1	Gorilla	"Whatever It Takes" by Imagine Dragons	undisclosed	SAFE
2	Chameleon	"Komsi Komsa" by Stéphane Legar	undisclosed	SAFE
3	Strawberry	"Summertime Sadness" by Lana Del Rey	undisclosed	SAFE
4	Horse	"Despacito" by Luis Fonsi and Daddy Yankee	undisclosed	SAFE
5	Pea	"Bad Guy" by Billie Eilish	undisclosed	SAFE
6	Babushka	"Russian Roulette" by Rihanna	undisclosed	SAFE

Performances on the fifth episode
#	Stage name	Song	Identity	Result
1	Horse	"Uptown Funk" by Mark Ronson feat. Bruno Mars	undisclosed	RISK
2	Strawberry	"Rehab" by Amy Winehouse	undisclosed	WIN
3	Gorilla	"Blinding Lights" by The Weeknd	undisclosed	WIN
4	Chameleon	"Incomplete" by Backstreet Boys	undisclosed	RISK
5	Pea	"All Star" by Smash Mouth	Itamar Grotto	OUT
6	Babushka	"Just Give Me a Reason" by Pink	undisclosed	WIN

Performances on the sixth episode
#	Stage name	Song	Identity	Result
1	Babushka	"Heaven Is a Place on Earth" by Belinda Carlisle	undisclosed	SAFE
2	Chameleon	"סוֹד" by Adam	undisclosed	SAFE
3	Horse	"True Colors" by Cyndi Lauper	undisclosed	SAFE
4	Strawberry	"There Must Be an Angel" by Eurythmics	Sandra Sade	OUT
5	Gorilla	"Purple Rain" by Prince and The Revolution	undisclosed	SAFE

=== Week 3 (October 31 & November 2/7) (Note: The voting took place in episode 8 as the contestants have all performed. Additional voting for the other five masks of the group took place in episode 9 after all contestants have performed.) ===
Performances on the seventh episode
#	Stage name	Song	Identity	Result
1	Spaghetti	"Soldi" by Mahmood	undisclosed	SAFE
2	Beetle	"Let's Get Loud" by Jennifer Lopez	undisclosed	SAFE
3	Chili	"Dragostea Din Tei" by O-Zone	undisclosed	SAFE
4	Fox	"Wannabe" by Spice Girls	undisclosed	SAFE
5	Hedgehog	"Waiting for Love" by Avicii	undisclosed	SAFE
6	Schnauzer	"Skyfall" by Adele	undisclosed	SAFE

Performances on the eighth episode
#	Stage name	Song	Identity	Result
1	Schnauzer	"Papaoutai" by Stromae	undisclosed	RISK
2	Chili	"ג'וני" by Bar Tzabary	undisclosed	WIN
3	Fox	"Back to Black" by Amy Winehouse	undisclosed	RISK
4	Spaghetti	"Believer" by Imagine Dragons	undisclosed	WIN
5	Hedgehog	"Moves Like Jagger" by Maroon 5 feat. Christina Aguilera	Nehemia Shtrasler	OUT
6	Beetle	"Juice" by Lizzo	undisclosed	WIN

Performances on the ninth episode
#	Stage name	Song	Identity	Result
1	Spaghetti	"Can't Take My Eyes Off You" by Frankie Valli	undisclosed	SAFE
2	Fox	"Love Me like You Do" by Ellie Goulding	undisclosed	SAFE
3	Chili	"Someone You Loved" by Lewis Capaldi	Kevin Rubin	OUT
4	Schnauzer	"An Eisai Ena Asteri" by Nikos Vertis	undisclosed	SAFE
5	Beetle	"Crazy in Love" by Beyoncé feat. Jay-Z	undisclosed	SAFE

=== Week 4 (November 8) ===
Performances on the tenth episode
#	Stage name	Song	Identity	Result
1	Oats	"Bang Bang" by Jessie J, Ariana Grande & Nicki Minaj	undisclosed	SAFE
2	Rugelach	"Hero" by Enrique Iglesias	Moshik Afia	OUT
3	Octopus	"Happy" by Pharrell Williams	undisclosed	SAFE
4	Oyster	"Somewhere Only We Know" by Keane	undisclosed	SAFE

=== Week 5 (November 14 & 16) ===
Performances on the eleventh episode
#	Stage name	Song	Identity	Result
1	Gorilla	"Cake by the Ocean" by DNCE	undisclosed	SAFE
2	Babushka	"Vogue" by Madonna	Tahounia Rubel	OUT
3	Horse	"Bye Bye Bye" by NSYNC	undisclosed	SAFE
4	Chameleon	"בית משוגעים" by Ran Danker	undisclosed	SAFE

Performances on the twelfth episode
#	Stage name	Song	Identity	Result
1	Schnauzer	"Let Me Love You" by DJ Snake feat. Justin Bieber	undisclosed	SAFE
2	Beetle	"Real Love" by The Beatles	Stav Shaffir	OUT
3	Fox	"Survivor" by Destiny's Child	undisclosed	SAFE
4	Spaghetti	"Love of My Life" by Queen	undisclosed	SAFE

=== Week 6 (November 20/22) ===
Performances on the thirteenth and fourteenth episode
Ep.	#	Stage name	Song	Identity	Result
13	1	Spaghetti	"Crazy" by Gnarls Barkley	undisclosed	SAFE
13	2	Oyster	"Dancing Queen" by ABBA	undisclosed	SAFE
13	3	Schnauzer	"Rocket Man" by Elton John	undisclosed	SAFE
13	4	Chameleon	"תל אביב" by Omer Adam	undisclosed	SAFE
13	5	Gorilla	"Heroes" by Måns Zelmerlöw	undisclosed	SAFE
14	6	Fox	"Dog Days Are Over" by Florence and the Machine	undisclosed	SAFE
14	7	Octopus	"Hotel California" by The Eagles	Haim Cohen	OUT
14	8	Horse	"Take My Breath Away" by Berlin	undisclosed	SAFE
14	9	Oats	"הלב שלי" by Ishay Ribo	undisclosed	SAFE

=== Week 7 (November 30/December 4) ===
Performances on the fifteenth episode
#	Stage name	Song	Identity	Result
1	Fox	"Shake It Off" by Taylor Swift	Hanny Nahmias	OUT
2	Oyster	"When We Were Young" by Adele	undisclosed	SAFE
3	Schnauzer	"Locked Out of Heaven" by Bruno Mars	undisclosed	SAFE
4	Gorilla	"Lately" by Stevie Wonder	undisclosed	SAFE

Performances on the sixteenth episode
#	Stage name	Song	Identity	Result
1	Spaghetti	"Hey Mama" by David Guetta feat. Nicki Minaj, Bebe Rexha, & Afrojack	undisclosed	SAFE
2	Horse	"Perfect" by Ed Sheeran	Moshe Datz	OUT
3	Chameleon	"קָָָרָָמֶלָה" by Moshe Peretz	undisclosed	SAFE
4	Oats	"What a Wonderful World" by Louis Armstrong	undisclosed	SAFE

=== Week 8 (December 6/December 11) ===
Performances on the seventeenth episode
#	Stage name	Song	Identity	Result
1	Oats	"Rise Up" by Andra Day	undisclosed	SAFE
2	Chameleon	"Sorry" by Justin Bieber	Maor Buzaglo	OUT
3	Spaghetti	"Dancing On My Own" by Robyn	undisclosed	SAFE

Performances on the eighteenth episode
#	Stage name	Song	Identity	Result
1	Raccoon	"I Believe I Can Fly" by R. Kelly	Itay Levy	GUEST
2	Oyster	"Flashdance... What a Feeling" by Irene Cara	Netta Garti	OUT
3	Schnauzer	"A Whole New World" by Brad Kane & Lea Salonga	undisclosed	SAFE
4	Gorilla	"Oops!... I Did It Again" by Britney Spears	undisclosed	SAFE

=== Week 9 - Semifinal & Final (December 13/December 18) ===
Performances on the nineteenth episode
#	Stage name	Song	Identity	Result
1	Spaghetti	"Further Up (Na, Na, Na, Na, Na)" by Static & Ben El and Pitbull	undisclosed	SAFE
2	Oats	"Ain't No Other Man" by Christina Aguilera	undisclosed	SAFE
3	Gorilla	"7 Rings" by Ariana Grande	undisclosed	SAFE
4	Schnauzer	"Empire State of Mind (Part II) Broken Down" by Alicia Keys	Nadav Abuksis	OUT

- Group Performance: "Rumor Has It" by Adele

Performances on the final episode
#	Stage name	Song	Identity	Result
Round One
1	Gorilla	"Mirrors" by Justin Timberlake	undisclosed	SAFE
2	Spaghetti	"Take Me to Church" by Hozier	undisclosed	SAFE
3	Oats	"End of the Road" by Noga Erez	Rotem Shefy	THIRD
Round Two
1	Spaghetti	"Golden Boy" by Nadav Guedj	Oz Zehavi	RUNNER-UP
2	Gorilla	"Fix You" by Coldplay	Shay Gabso	WINNER

== Season 3 ==
Contestants

Stage Name	Celebrity	Occupation	Episodes																			
Stage Name	Celebrity	Occupation	1	2	3	4	5	6	7	8	9	10	11	12	13/14	15	16	17	18	19	20	
Stage Name	Celebrity	Occupation	Group A			Group B			Group C			A	B	C	13/14	15	16	17	18	19	A	B
Spider	Yael Elkana	Actress	SAFE	SAFE	SAFE							SAFE			SAFE	SAFE		SAFE		SAFE	SAFE	WINNER
Fish	Adi Bity	Singer				SAFE	SAFE	SAFE					SAFE		SAFE		SAFE		SAFE	SAFE	SAFE	RUNNER-UP
Snail	Assaf Amdursky	Singer	SAFE	SAFE	SAFE							SAFE			SAFE		SAFE		SAFE	SAFE	THIRD	
Hippo	Ben Artzi	Singer				SAFE	SAFE	SAFE					SAFE		SAFE	SAFE		SAFE		OUT		
Mosquito	Eliraz Sade	TV Host							SAFE	SAFE	SAFE			SAFE	SAFE		SAFE		OUT			
Cotton Candy	Ilanit Levy	Model	SAFE	SAFE	SAFE							SAFE			SAFE	SAFE		OUT				
King & Queen	Tal Mosseri	Actor							SAFE	SAFE	SAFE			SAFE	SAFE		OUT					
King & Queen	Michal Yannai	Actress							SAFE	SAFE	SAFE			SAFE	SAFE		OUT					
Artichoke	Linoy Ashram	Rhythmic gymnast				SAFE	SAFE	SAFE					SAFE		SAFE	OUT						
Hamsa	Shani Klein	Actress							SAFE	SAFE	SAFE			SAFE	OUT							
Owl	Meir Adoni	Chef							SAFE	SAFE	SAFE			OUT								
Peacock	Erez Tal	TV Host				SAVED	SAFE	SAFE					OUT									
Pineapple	Ruslana Rodina	Model	SAFE	SAFE	SAFE							OUT										
Chick	Dafna Armoni	Singer							SAFE	SAFE	OUT											
Coral	Dudu Fisher	Cantor							SAFE	OUT												
Robot	Sarit Polak	Events producer				SAFE	SAFE	OUT														
Sheep	Asher Swissa	DJ				SAFE	OUT															
Cat	Boaz Bismuth	Journalist	SAFE	SAFE	OUT																	
Frog	Yoram Arbel	TV Presenter	OUT																			

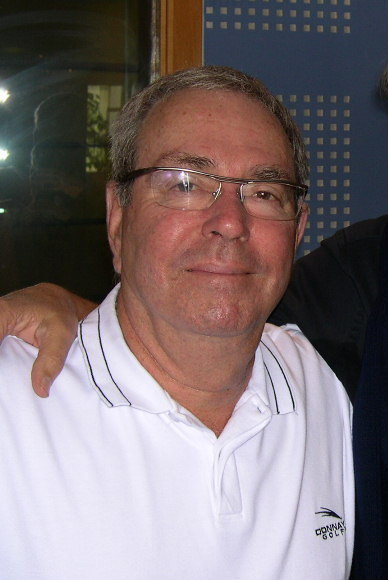
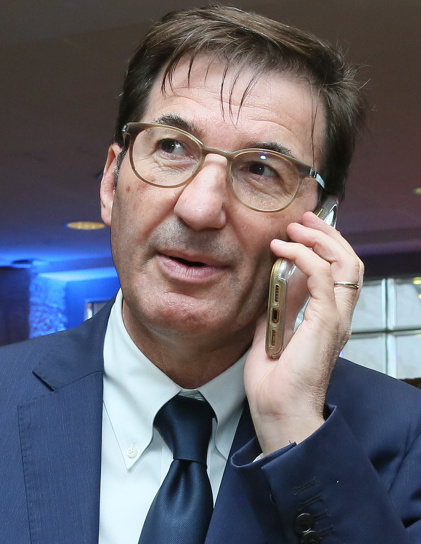
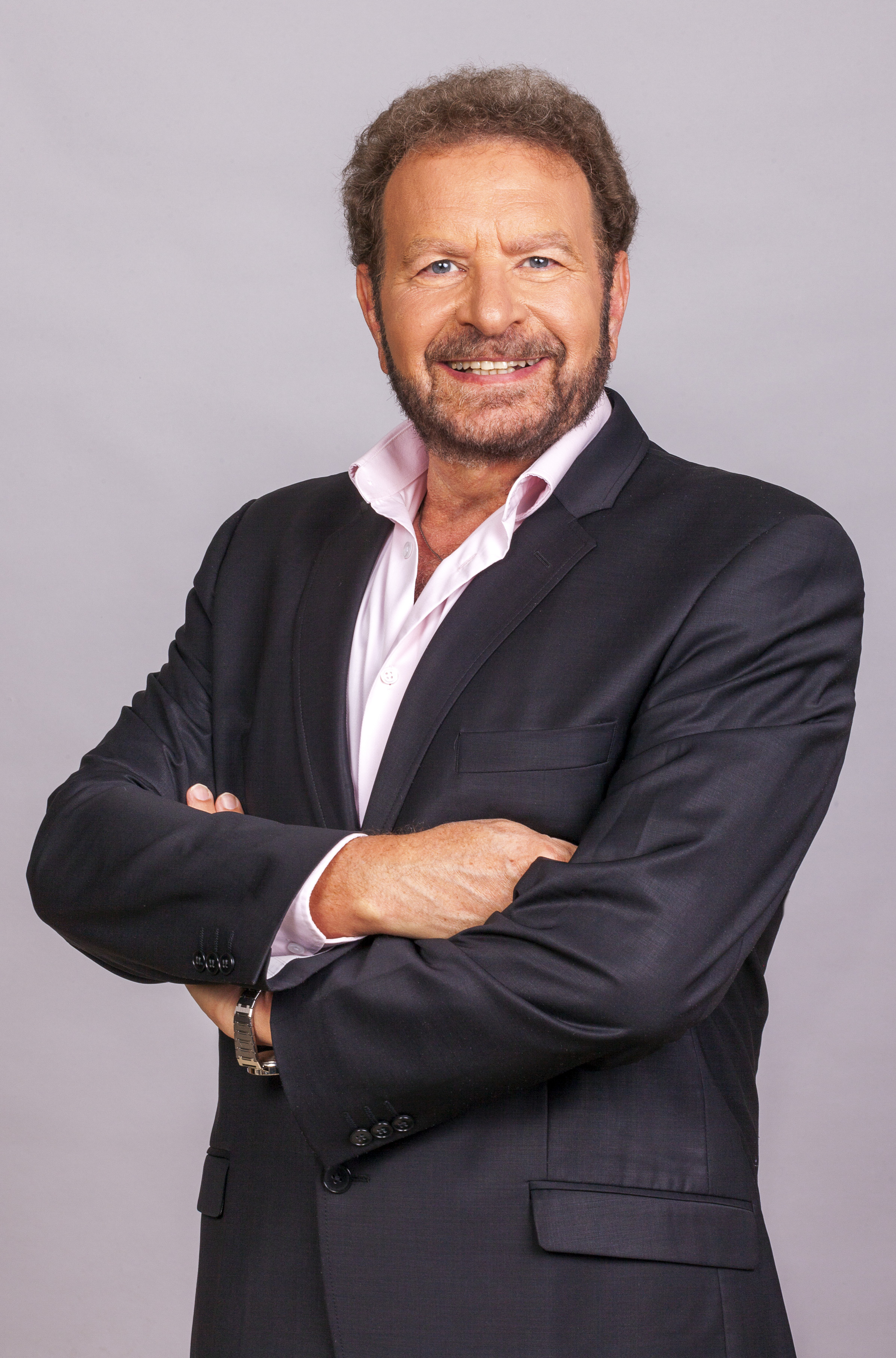
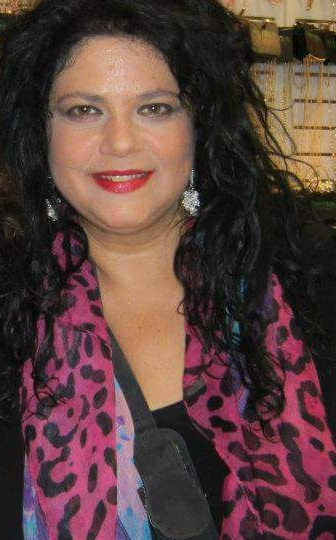
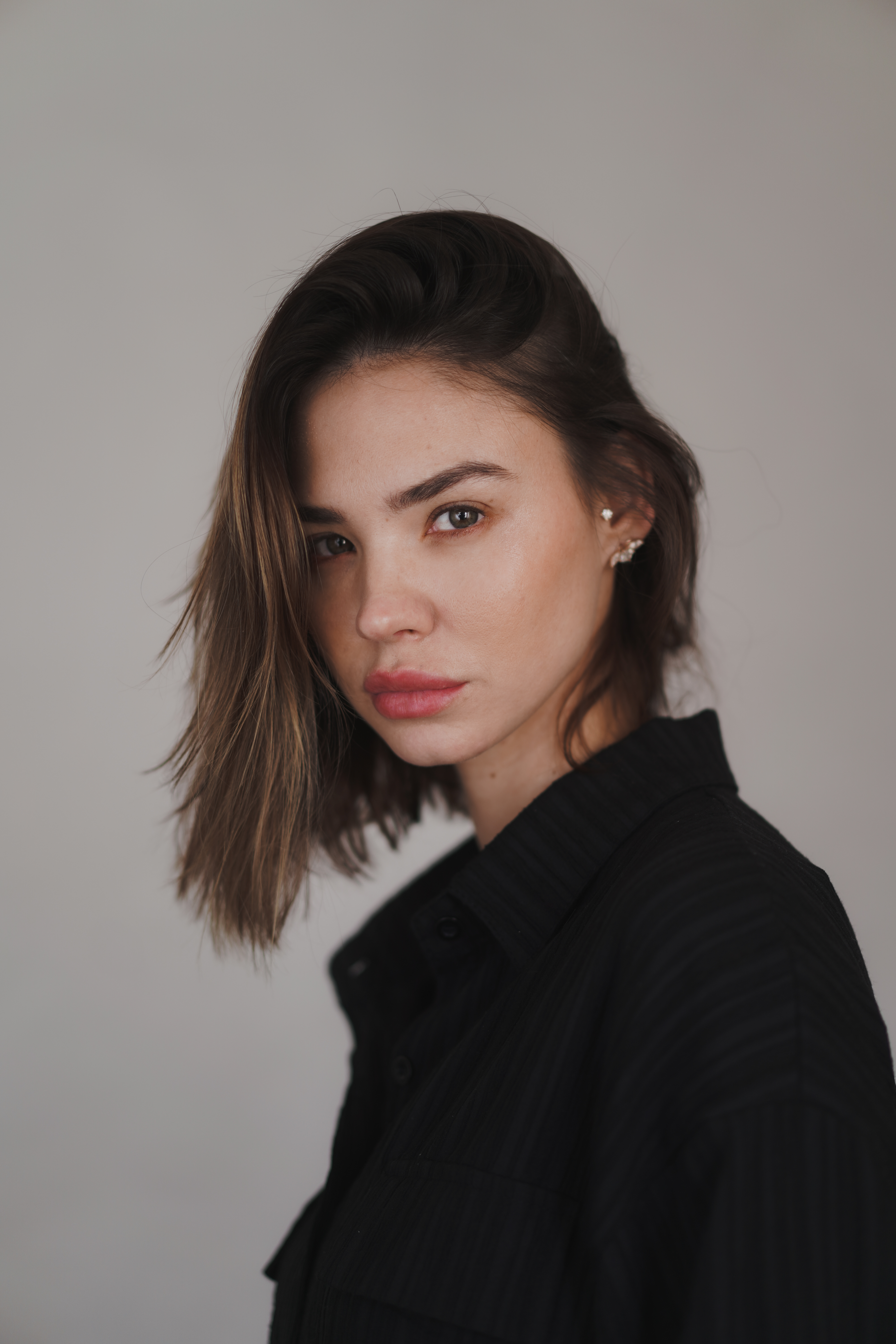
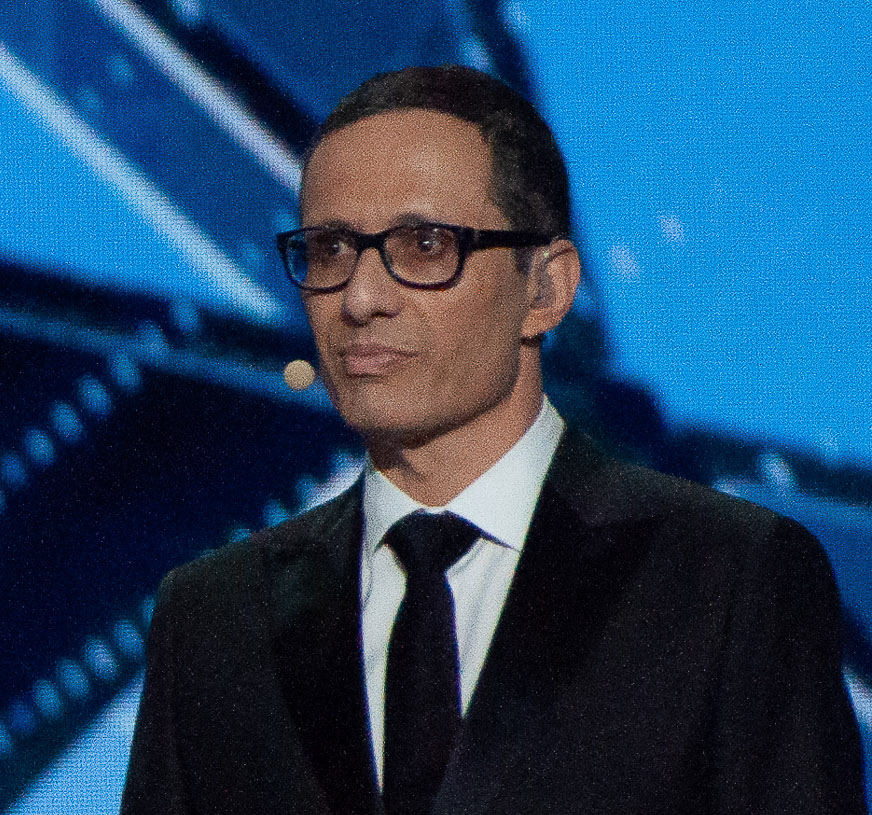
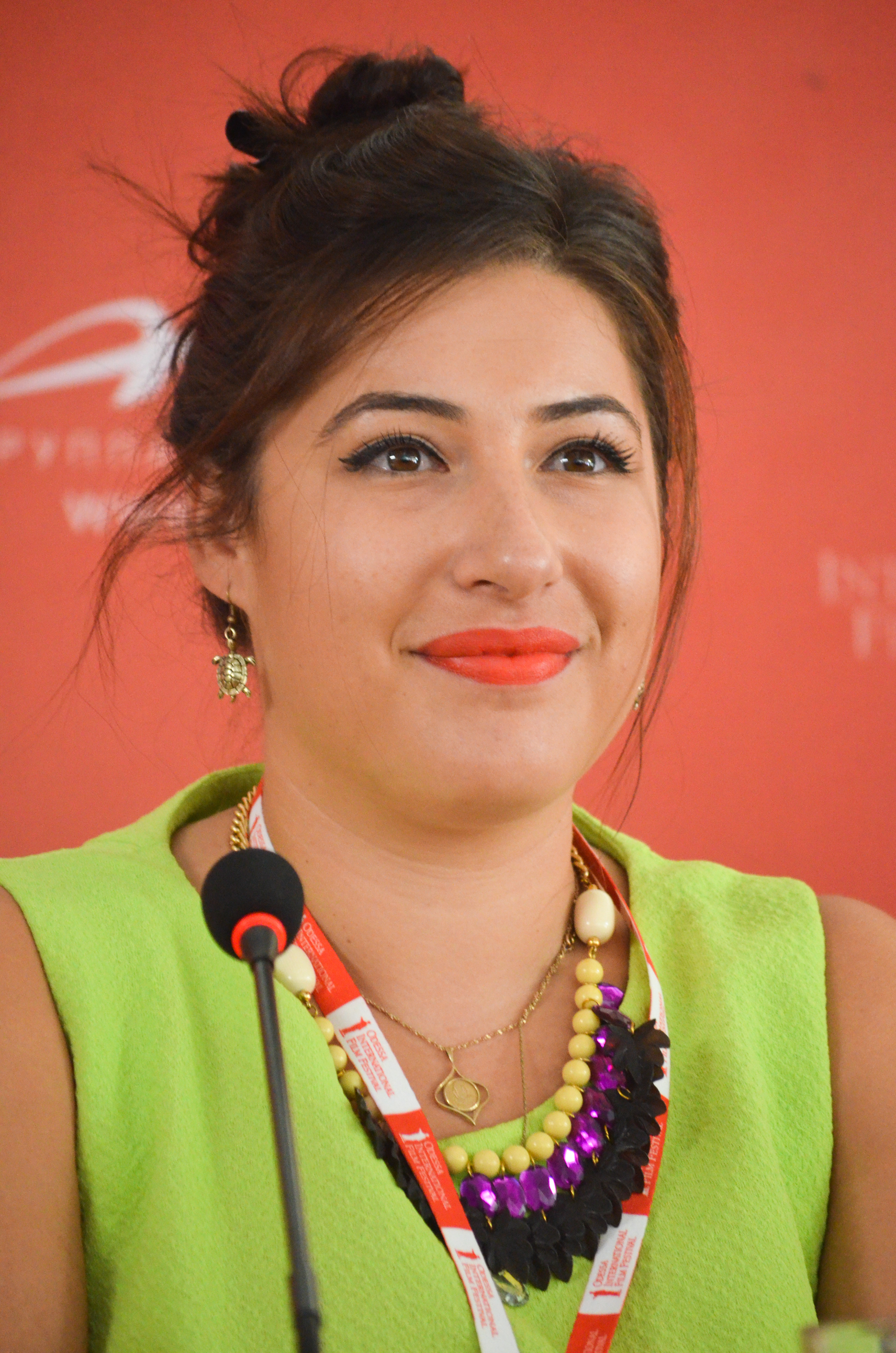
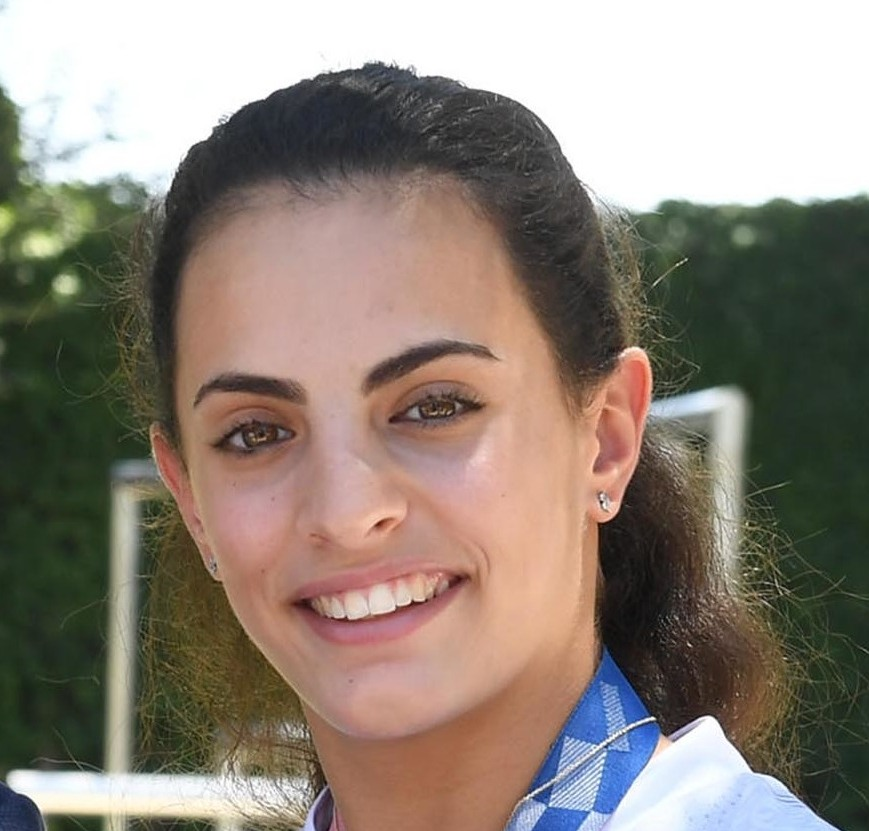
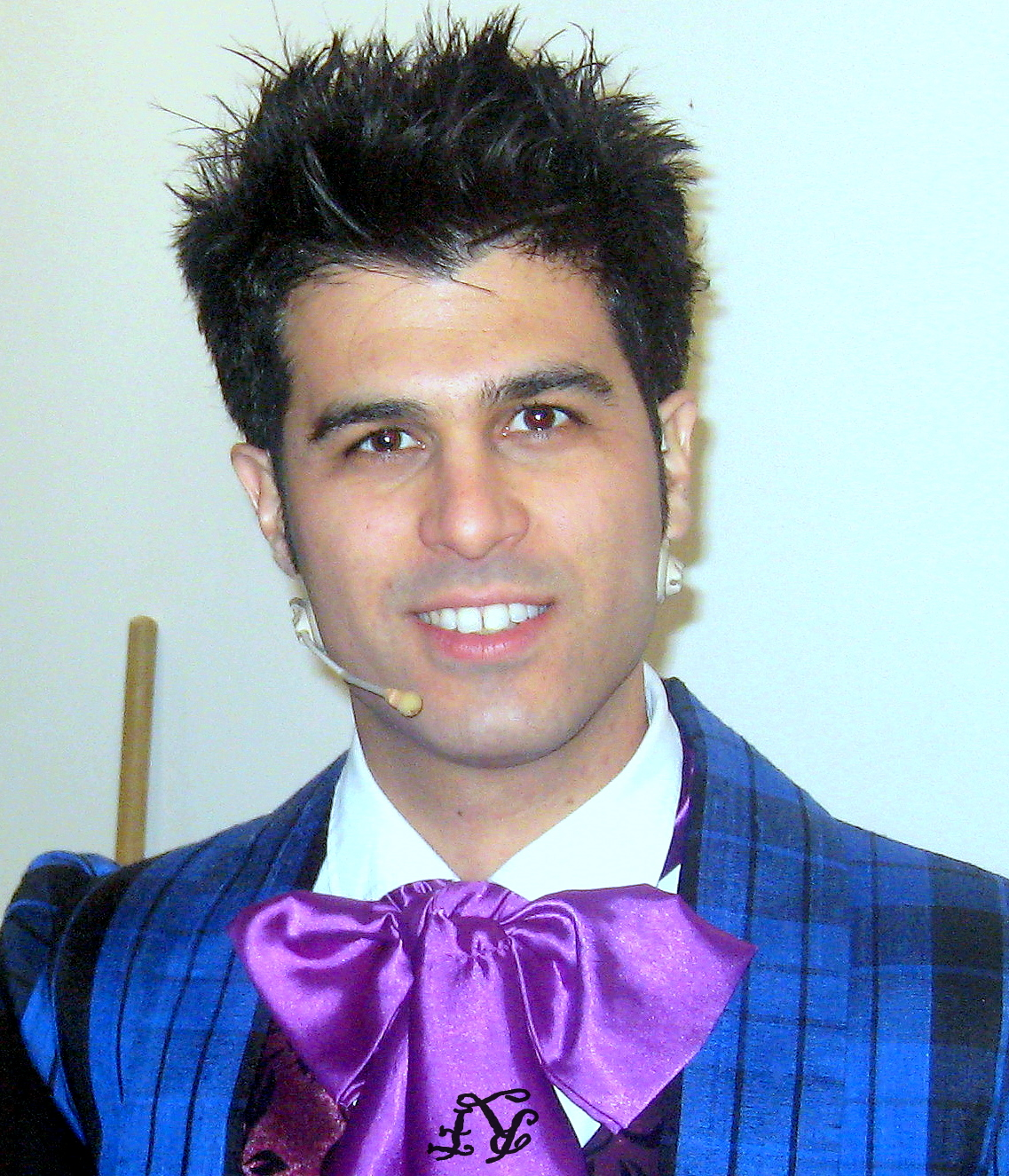
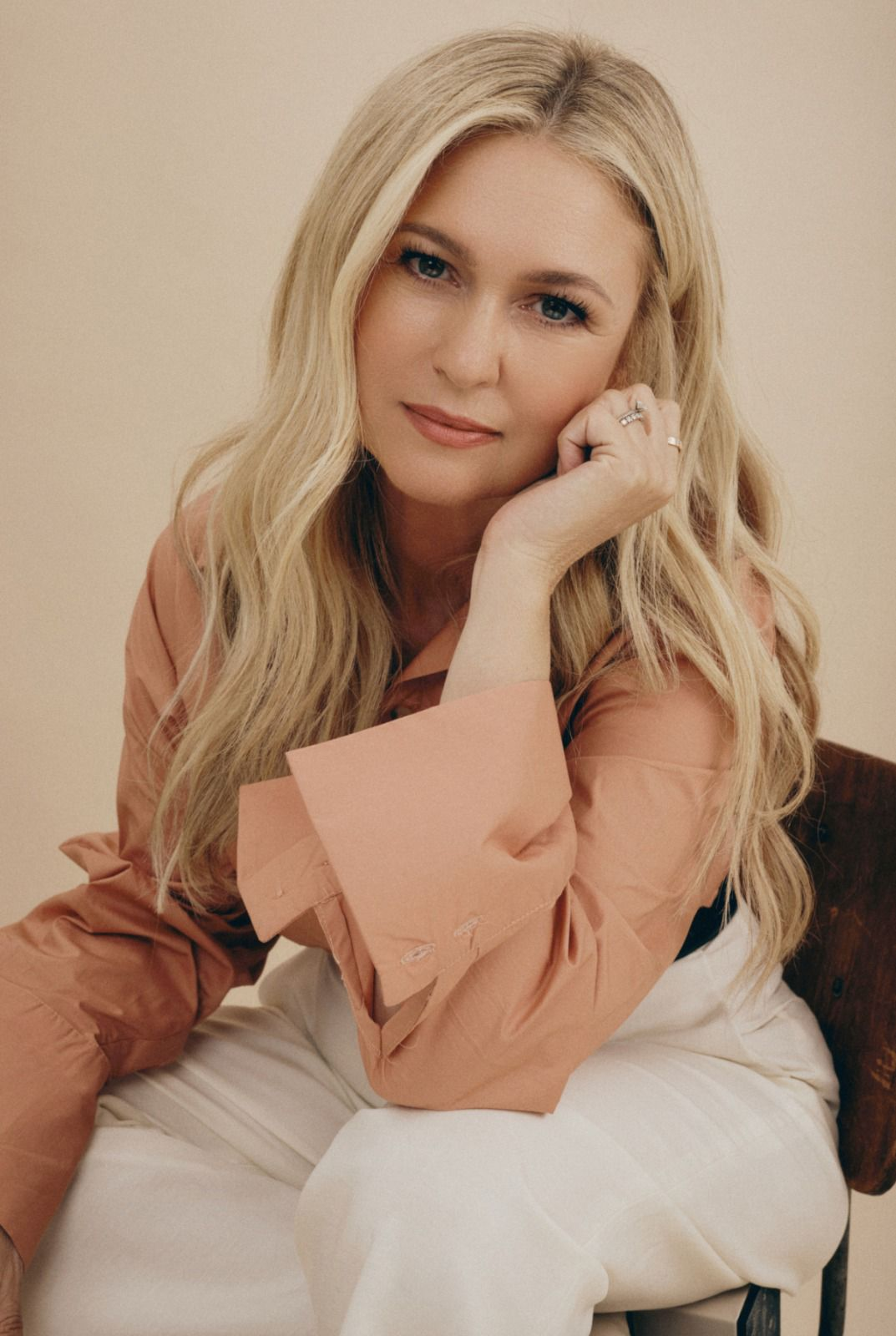
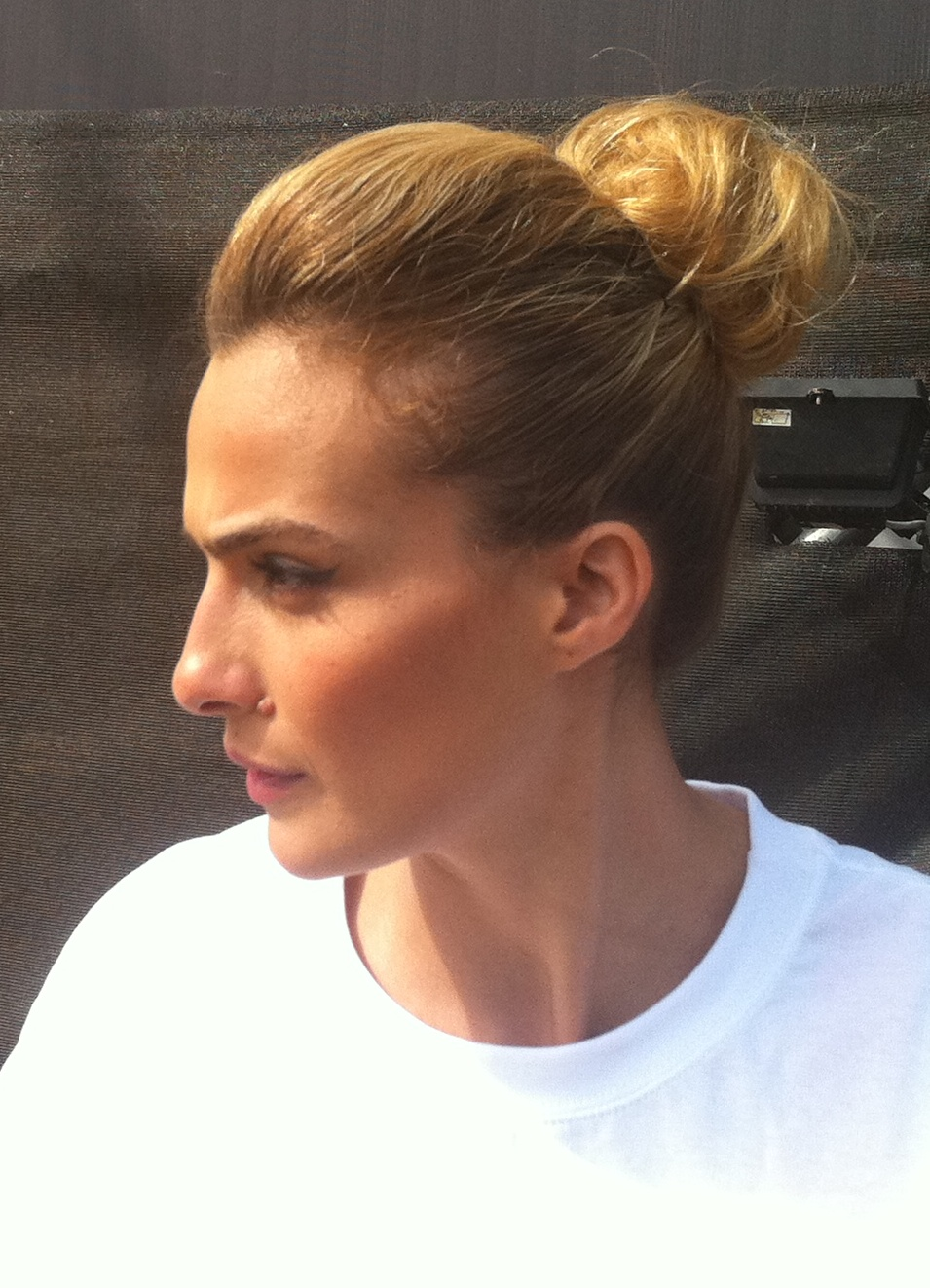
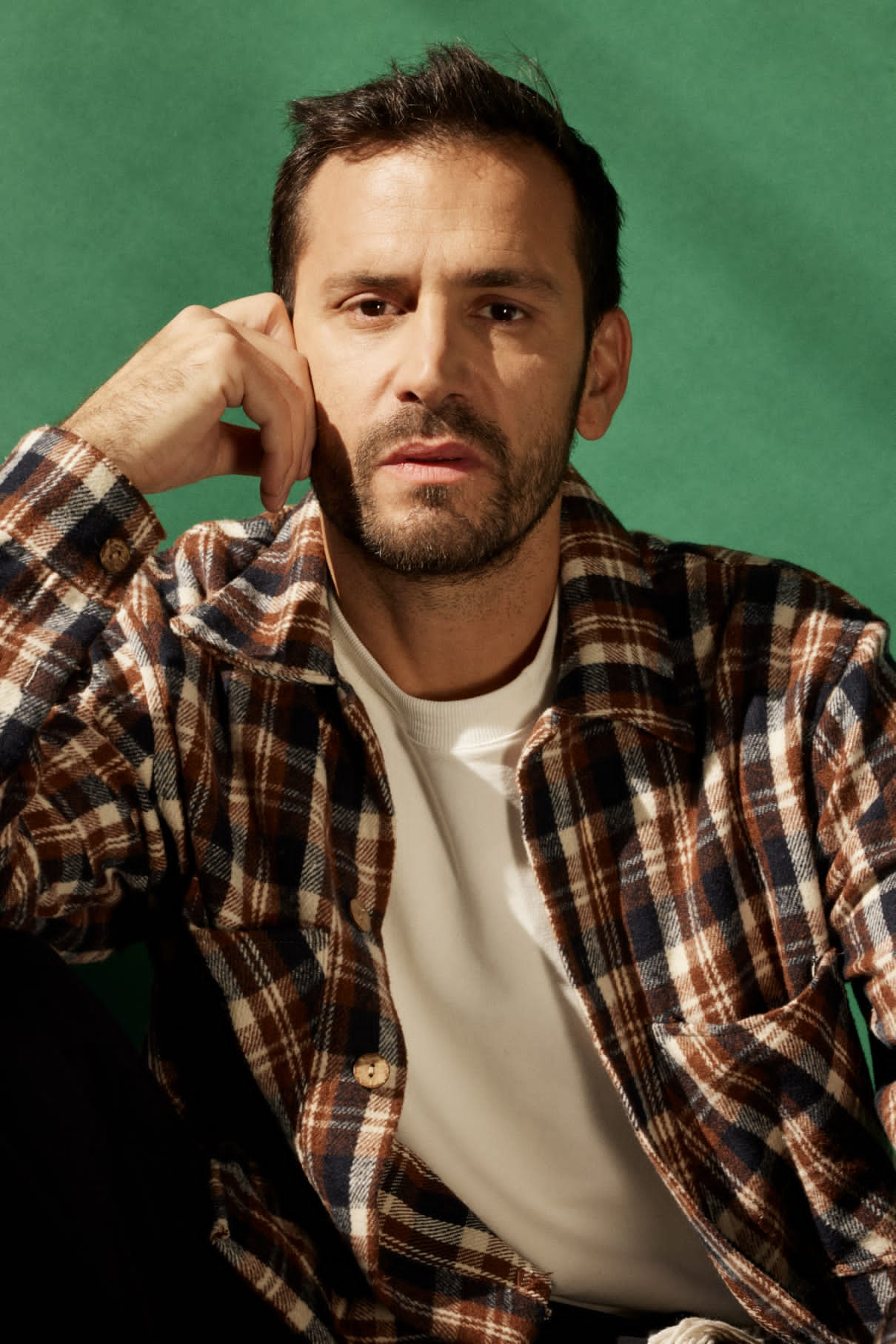
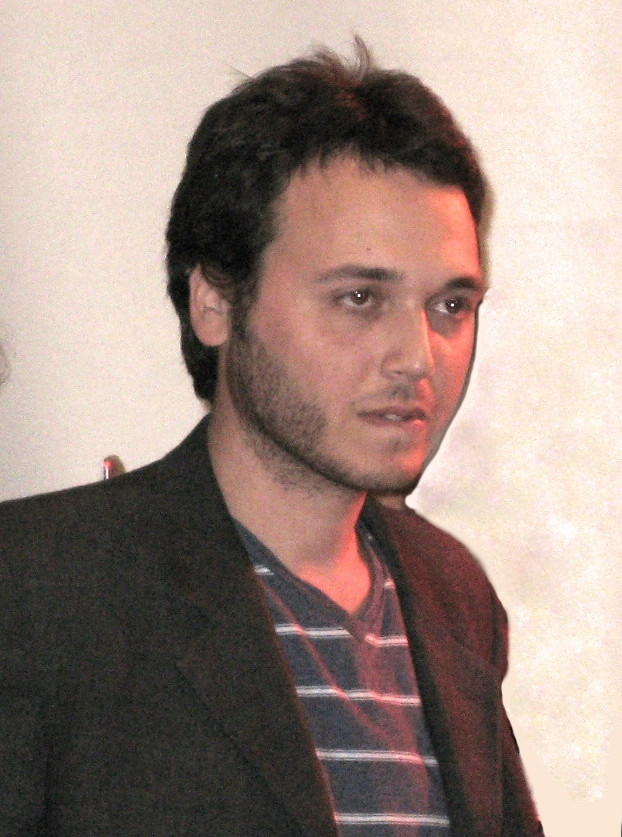
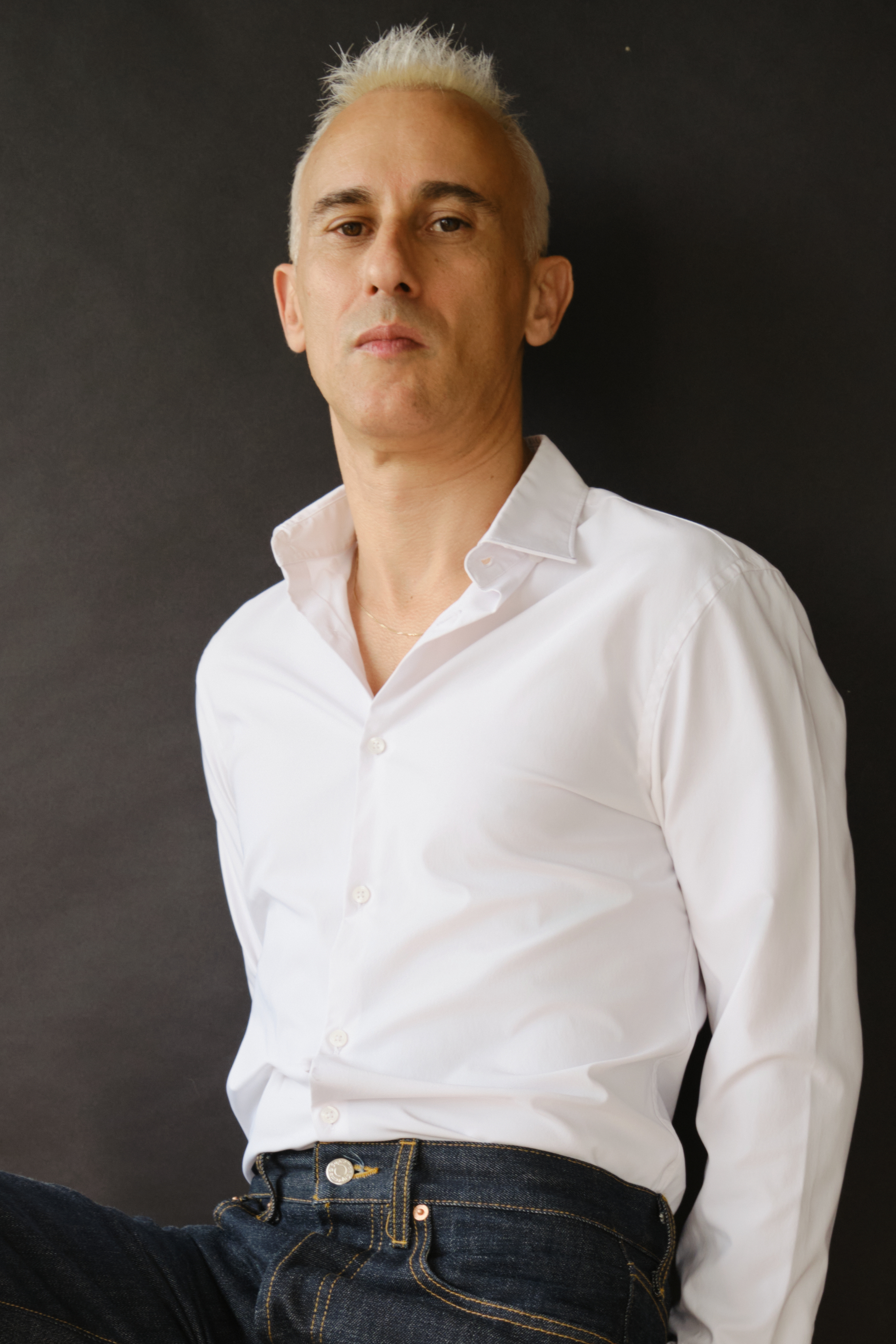
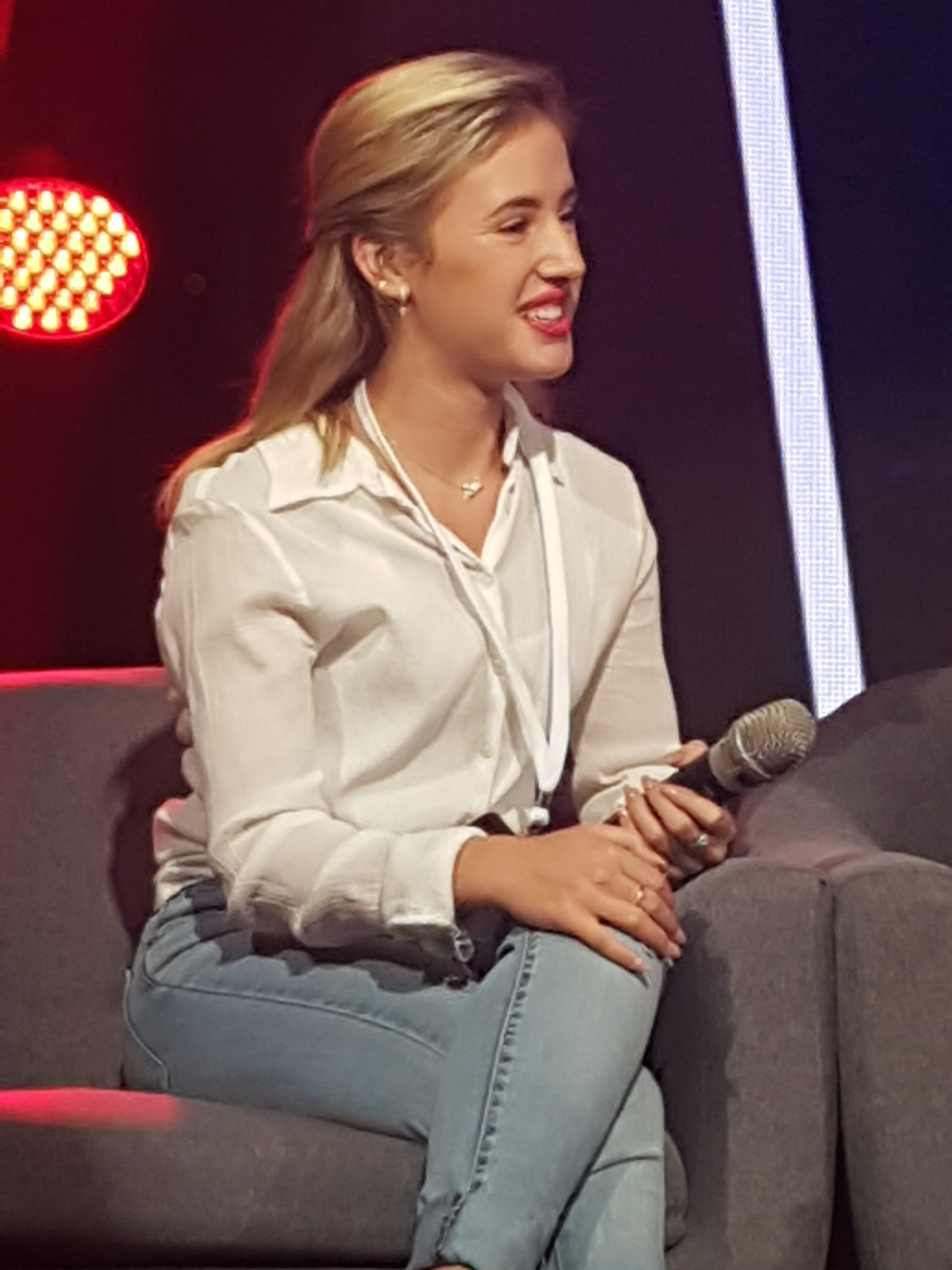
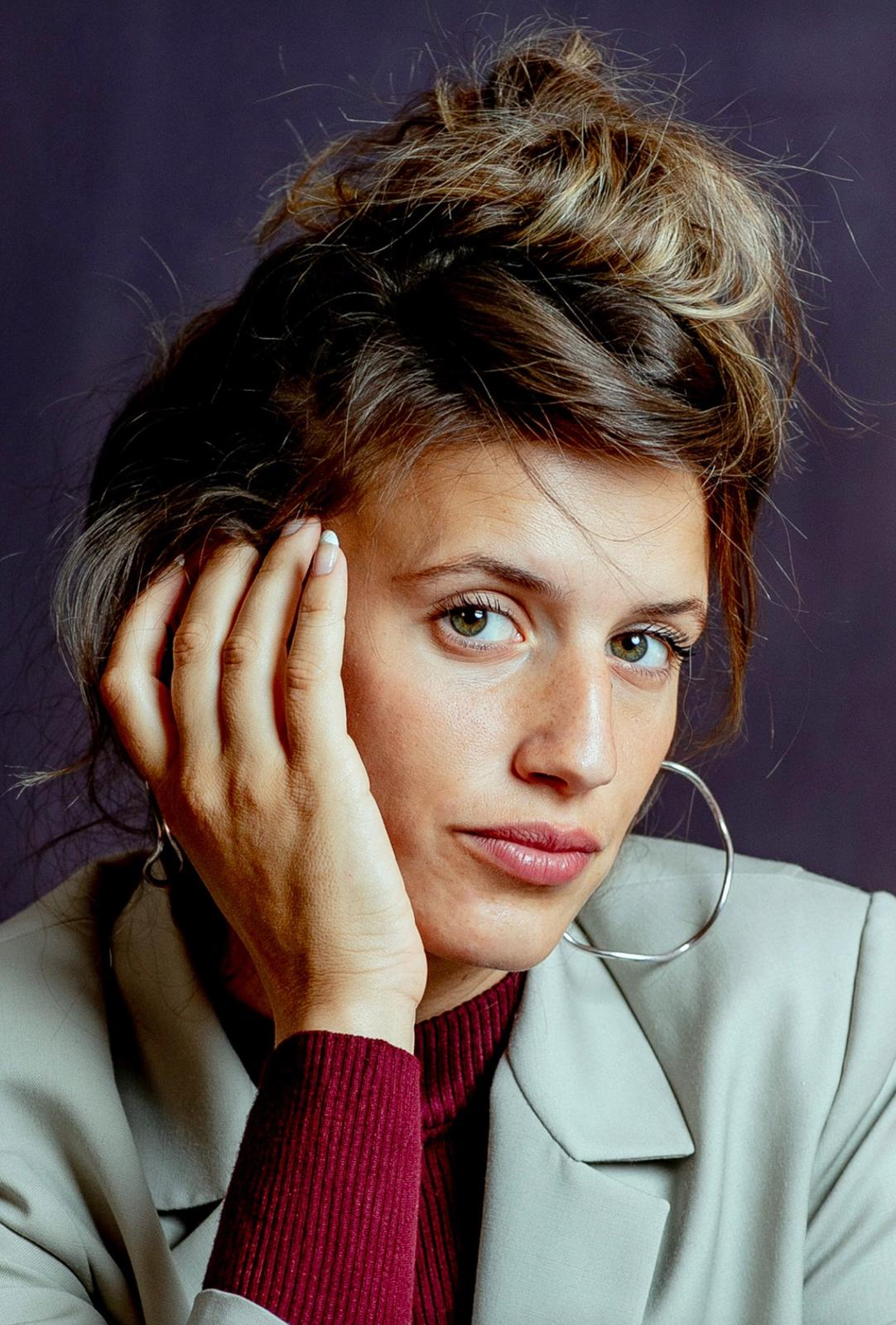
The celebrities who competed in the third season of The Singer in the Mask, pictured in order of elimination (l-r):

Yoram Arbel ("Frog"), Boaz Bismuth ("Cat"), Dudu Fisher ("Coral"), Dafna Armoni ("Chick"), Ruslana Rodina ("Pineapple"), Erez Tal ("Peacock"), Shani Klein ("Hamsa"), Linoy Ashram ("Artichoke"), Tal Mosseri ("King"), Michal Yannai ("Queen"), Ilanit Levy ("Cotton Candy"), Eliraz Sade ("Mosquito"), Ben Artzi ("Hippo"), Assaf Amdursky ("Snail"), Adi Bity ("Fish"), Yael Elkana ("Spider")

Not pictured: Asher Swisa ("Sheep"), Sarit Polak ("Robot"), Meir Adoni ("Owl")

Episodes

=== Week 1 (December 17/19) (Note: The voting took place in episode 3 as the contestants have all performed. Additional voting for the other five masks of the group took place in episode 4 after all contestants have performed.) ===
Guest Performance: "Love Runs Out" by OneRepublic performed by Shay Gabso as "Gorilla" and Ido Rosenblum as "Rooster"

Performances on the first episode
#	Stage name	Song	Identity	Result
1	Spider	"Industry Baby" by Lil Nas X and Jack Harlow	undisclosed	SAFE
2	Snail	"Stay" by The Kid LAROI and Justin Bieber	undisclosed	SAFE
3	Cotton Candy	"Levitating" by Dua Lipa ft. DaBaby	undisclosed	SAFE
4	Cat	"Scream & Shout" by will.i.am and Britney Spears	undisclosed	SAFE
5	Pineapple	"Hot Stuff" by Donna Summer	undisclosed	SAFE
6	Frog	"Señorita" by Camila Cabello & Shawn Mendes	Yoram Arbel	OUT

Performances on the second episode
#	Stage name	Song	Identity	Result
1	Cotton Candy	"Into You" by Ariana Grande (duet with Eden Ben Zaken)	undisclosed	SAFE
2	Spider	"מנגינה" by Eden Ben Zaken (duet with Eden Ben Zaken)	undisclosed	SAFE
3	Snail	"Save Your Tears" by The Weeknd (duet with Eden Ben Zaken)	undisclosed	SAFE
4	Cat	"מועבט" by Eden Ben Zaken & Itay Galo (duet with Eden Ben Zaken)	undisclosed	SAFE
5	Pineapple	"Hips Dont Lie" by Shakira (duet with Eden Ben Zaken)	undisclosed	SAFE

=== Week 2 (December 24/26) ===
Performances on the third episode
#	Stage name	Song	Identity	Result
1	Pineapple	"Mamma Mia" by ABBA	undisclosed	SAFE
2	Snail	"How Far I'll Go" by Auliʻi Cravalho	undisclosed	SAFE
3	Cotton Candy	"Fame" by Irene Cara	undisclosed	SAFE
4	Cat	"Oh, Pretty Woman" by Roy Orbison	Boaz Bismuth	OUT
5	Spider	"When You Believe" by Mariah Carey and Whitney Houston	undisclosed	SAFE

Performances on the fourth episode
#	Stage name	Song	Identity	Result
1	Fish	"It's Raining Men" by The Weather Girls	undisclosed	SAFE
2	Hippo	"24K Magic" by Bruno Mars	undisclosed	SAFE
3	Sheep	"לעוף" by Harel Skaat	undisclosed	SAFE
4	Robot	"Me Too" by Meghan Trainor	undisclosed	SAFE
5	Artichoke	"יהלום" by Agam Buchbut	undisclosed	SAFE
6	Peacock	"Viva la Vida" by Coldplay	undisclosed	SAVED (Note: The panel were challenged to guess Peacock's identity, which they incorrectly guessed Yisrael Aharoni. As they failed their challenge, Peacock was allowed to remain in the competition.)

=== Week 3 (December 31/January 2/3) ===
Performances on the fifth episode
#	Stage name	Song	Identity	Result
1	Fish	"Chandelier" by Sia	undisclosed	SAFE
2	Sheep	"Swalla" by Jason Derulo	Asher Swissa	OUT
3	Hippo	"Attention" by Charlie Puth	undisclosed	SAFE
4	Artichoke	"Girl on Fire" by Alicia Keys	undisclosed	SAFE
5	Robot	"Sweet but Psycho" by Ava Max	undisclosed	SAFE
6	Peacock	"Watermelon Sugar" by Harry Styles	undisclosed	SAFE

Performances on the sixth episode
#	Stage name	Song	Identity	Result
1	Hippo	"Stop Crying Your Heart Out" by Oasis	undisclosed	SAFE
2	Artichoke	"Don't Speak" by No Doubt	undisclosed	SAFE
3	Fish	"November Rain" by Guns N' Roses	undisclosed	SAFE
4	Peacock	"Smells Like Teen Spirit" by Nirvana	undisclosed	SAFE
5	Robot	"Let It Be" by The Beatles	Sarit Polak	OUT

Performances on the seventh episode
#	Stage name	Song	Identity	Result
1	Hamsa	"Only Girl (In The World)" by Rihanna	undisclosed	SAFE
2	Owl	"דרך השלום" by Pe'er Tasi	undisclosed	SAFE
3	Chick	"Dance Monkey" by Tones and I	undisclosed	SAFE
4	Mosquito	"Treat You Better" by Shawn Mendes	undisclosed	SAFE
5	Coral	"I Will Survive" by Gloria Gaynor	undisclosed	SAFE
6	King & Queen	"Brividi" by Blanco and Mahmood	undisclosed	SAFE

=== Week 4 (January 7/9) ===
Performances on the eighth episode
#	Stage name	Song	Identity	Result
1	Chick	"Feel It Still" by Portugal. The Man	undisclosed	SAFE
2	Hamsa	"Titanium" by David Guetta feat. Sia	undisclosed	SAFE
3	King & Queen	"Because You Loved Me" by Celine Dion	undisclosed	SAFE
4	Mosquito	"Bella" by Static & Ben El Tavori	undisclosed	SAFE
5	Owl	"זיקוקים" by Moshe Peretz	undisclosed	SAFE
6	Coral	"Beggin'" by Måneskin	Dudu Fisher	OUT

Performances on the ninth episode
#	Stage name	Song	Identity	Result
1	Hamsa	"Hero" by Mariah Carey	undisclosed	SAFE
2	Chick	"Lady Marmalade" by Labelle	Dafna Armoni	OUT
3	King & Queen	"How Will I Know" by Whitney Houston	undisclosed	SAFE
4	Owl	"בוא" by Rita	undisclosed	SAFE
5	Mosquito	"You're Still the One" by Shania Twain	undisclosed	SAFE

=== Week 5 (January 14/16) ===
Performances on the tenth episode
#	Stage name	Song	Identity	Result
1	Spider	"Wings" by Little Mix	undisclosed	SAFE
2	Pineapple	"Faded" by Alan Walker	Ruslana Rodina	OUT
3	Snail	"Love on the Brain" by Rihanna	undisclosed	SAFE
4	Cotton Candy	"Unstoppable" by Sia	undisclosed	SAFE

Performances on the eleventh episode
#	Stage name	Song	Identity	Result
1	Fish	"Telephone" by Lady Gaga & Beyoncé	undisclosed	SAFE
2	Hippo	"Kiss" by Prince	undisclosed	SAFE
3	Artichoke	"לך לישון" by Anna Zak	undisclosed	SAFE
4	Peacock	"Sugar" by Maroon 5	Erez Tal	OUT

=== Week 6 (January 21) ===
Performances on the twelfth episode
#	Stage name	Song	Identity	Result
1	Mosquito	"Love Me Again" by John Newman	undisclosed	SAFE
2	Hamsa	"Whats Up?" by 4 Non Blondes	undisclosed	SAFE
3	King & Queen	"Thought About That" by Noa Kirel	undisclosed	SAFE
4	Owl	"לא להיות לבד" by Inbal Paz	Meir Adoni	OUT

=== Week 7 (January 25/28) ===
Performances on the thirteenth and fourteenth episode
Ep.	#	Stage name	Song	Identity	Result
13	1	Spider	"חצי דפוק" by Omer Adam	undisclosed	SAFE
13	2	Hippo	"Thriller" by Michael Jackson	undisclosed	SAFE
13	3	Hamsa	"Material Girl" by Madonna	Shani Klein	OUT
13	4	Mosquito	"Shape of You" by Ed Sheeran	undisclosed	SAFE
13	5	Fish	"Somebody to Love" by Queen	undisclosed	SAFE
14	6	Cotton Candy	"... Baby One More Time" by Britney Spears	undisclosed	SAFE
14	7	King & Queen	"Poker Face" by Lady Gaga	undisclosed	SAFE
14	8	Snail	"Dynamite" by BTS	undisclosed	SAFE
14	9	Artichoke	"ליבינג דה דרים" by Nunu	undisclosed	SAFE

=== Week 8 (January 29/February 4) ===
Performances on the fifteenth episode
#	Stage name	Song	Identity	Result
1	Artichoke	"Because of You" by Kelly Clarkson	Linoy Ashram	OUT
2	Hippo	"Sign of the Times" by Harry Styles	undisclosed	SAFE
3	Spider	"End of Time" by Beyoncé	undisclosed	SAFE
4	Cotton Candy	"Hurt" by Christina Aguilera	undisclosed	SAFE

Performances on the sixteenth episode
#	Stage name	Song	Identity	Result
1	Fish	"You & I" by One Direction	undisclosed	SAFE
2	Snail	"That's What I Like" by Bruno Mars	undisclosed	SAFE
3	Mosquito	"Counting Stars" by OneRepublic	undisclosed	SAFE
4	King & Queen	"I Still Haven't Found What I'm Looking For" by U2	Tal Mosseri & Michal Yannai	OUT

=== Week 9 (February 6/11) ===
Performances on the seventeenth episode
#	Stage name	Song	Identity	Result
1	Hippo	"Goodbye Yellow Brick Road" by Elton John	undisclosed	SAFE
2	Cotton Candy	"New Rules" by Dua Lipa	Ilanit Levy	OUT
3	Spider	"Irreplaceable" by Beyoncé	undisclosed	SAFE

Performances on the eighteenth episode
#	Stage name	Song	Identity	Result
1	Fish	"A Thousand Years" by Christina Perri	undisclosed	SAFE
2	Snail	"Everybody (Backstreet's Back)" by Backstreet Boys	undisclosed	SAFE
3	Mosquito	"Angels" by Robbie Williams	Eliraz Sade	OUT
4	Bonnet	"Eye of the Tiger" by Survivor	Rafi Ginat	GUEST

=== Week 10 - Semifinal & Final (February 14/18) ===
Performances on the nineteenth episode
#	Stage name	Song	Identity	Result
1	Hippo	"Can't Feel My Face" by The Weeknd	Ben Artzi	OUT
2	Fish	"Love on Top" by Beyoncé	undisclosed	SAFE
3	Snail	"As It Was" by Harry Styles	undisclosed	SAFE
4	Spider	"Lonely" by Justin Bieber and Benny Blanco	undisclosed	SAFE

Performances on the final episode
#	Stage name	Song	Identity	Result
Round One
1	Spider	"Can't Hold Us" by Macklemore & Ryan Lewis	undisclosed	SAFE
2	Snail	"Finally" by CeCe Peniston	Assaf Amdursky	THIRD
3	Fish	"Bootylicious" by Destiny's Child	undisclosed	SAFE
Round Two
1	Fish	"All I Ask" by Adele	Adi Bity	RUNNER-UP
2	Spider	"Bohemian Rhapsody" by Queen	Yael Elkana	WINNER

== Season 4 ==
Contestants

Stage Name	Celebrity	Occupation	Episodes																			
Stage Name	Celebrity	Occupation	1	2	3	4	5	6	7	8	9	10	11	12	13/14	15	16	17	18	19	20	
Stage Name	Celebrity	Occupation	A	B	C	B		A		C		B	A	C	13/14	15	16	17	18	19	A	B
Sufganiyah	Dana Ivgy	Actress		SAFE		SAFE	SAFE					SAFE			SAFE		SAFE	SAFE		SAFE	SAFE	WINNER
Poodle	Mali Levi	Actress		SAFE		SAFE	SAFE					SAFE			SAFE	SAFE			RISK	SAFE	SAFE	RUNNER-UP
Butterfly	Maya Dagan	Actress			SAFE					SAFE	SAFE			SAFE	SAFE		SAFE	RISK		SAFE	THIRD	
Panther	Taylor Malkov	Singer			SAFE					SAFE	SAFE			SAFE	SAFE	SAFE			SAFE	OUT		
Sloth	Zvika Hadar (Note: For the first time, same celebrity was in two masks in same season, when Zvika Hadar was "Two-Faced" and "Sloth".)	Actor			SAFE					SAFE	SAFE			SAFE	SAFE	SAFE			OUT			
Bubblegum	Miki Kam	Actress	SAFE					SAFE	SAFE				SAFE		SAFE		SAFE	OUT				
Alpaca	Oshri Cohen	Actor	SAFE					SAFE	SAFE				SAFE		SAFE		OUT					
Scarecrow	Lihi Griner	Reality Television Personality		SAFE		SAFE	SAFE					SAFE			SAFE	OUT						
Panda	Evelin Hagoel	Actress	SAFE					SAFE	SAFE				SAFE		OUT							
Monster	Tuvia Tzafir	Actor			SAFE					SAFE	N/A			Disqualified (Note: After he missed at the last episode from personal reasons the Monster was disqualified and out form the show.)								
Two-faced	Zvika Hadar	Actor	SAFE					SAFE	SAFE				OUT									
Hurricane	Avi Greinik	Comedian		SAFE		SAFE	SAFE					OUT										
Pufferfish	Yishai Levi	Singer			SAFE					SAFE	OUT											
Bat	Nadav Bornstein	Journalist	SAFE					SAFE	OUT													
Watermelon	Menachem Horowitz	Journalist		SAFE		SAFE	OUT															
Broccoli	Orna Barbivai	Politician		SAFE		OUT																
Doll	Gila Almagor	Actress			OUT																	
Mr. TV	Meir Sheetrit	Politician		OUT																		
Saturn	Yaron Berald	Actor	OUT																			

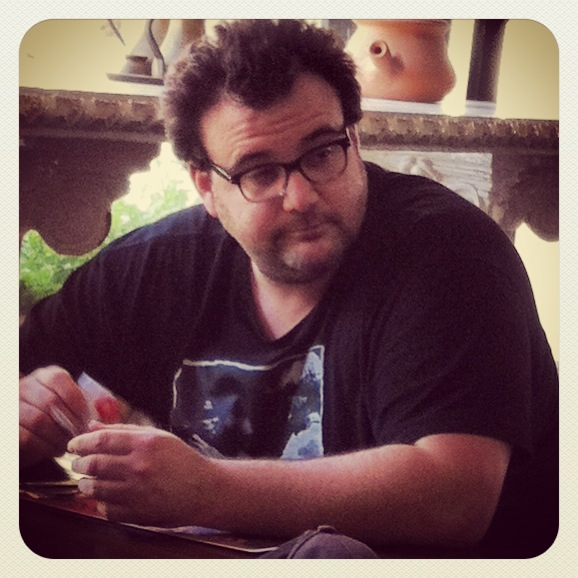
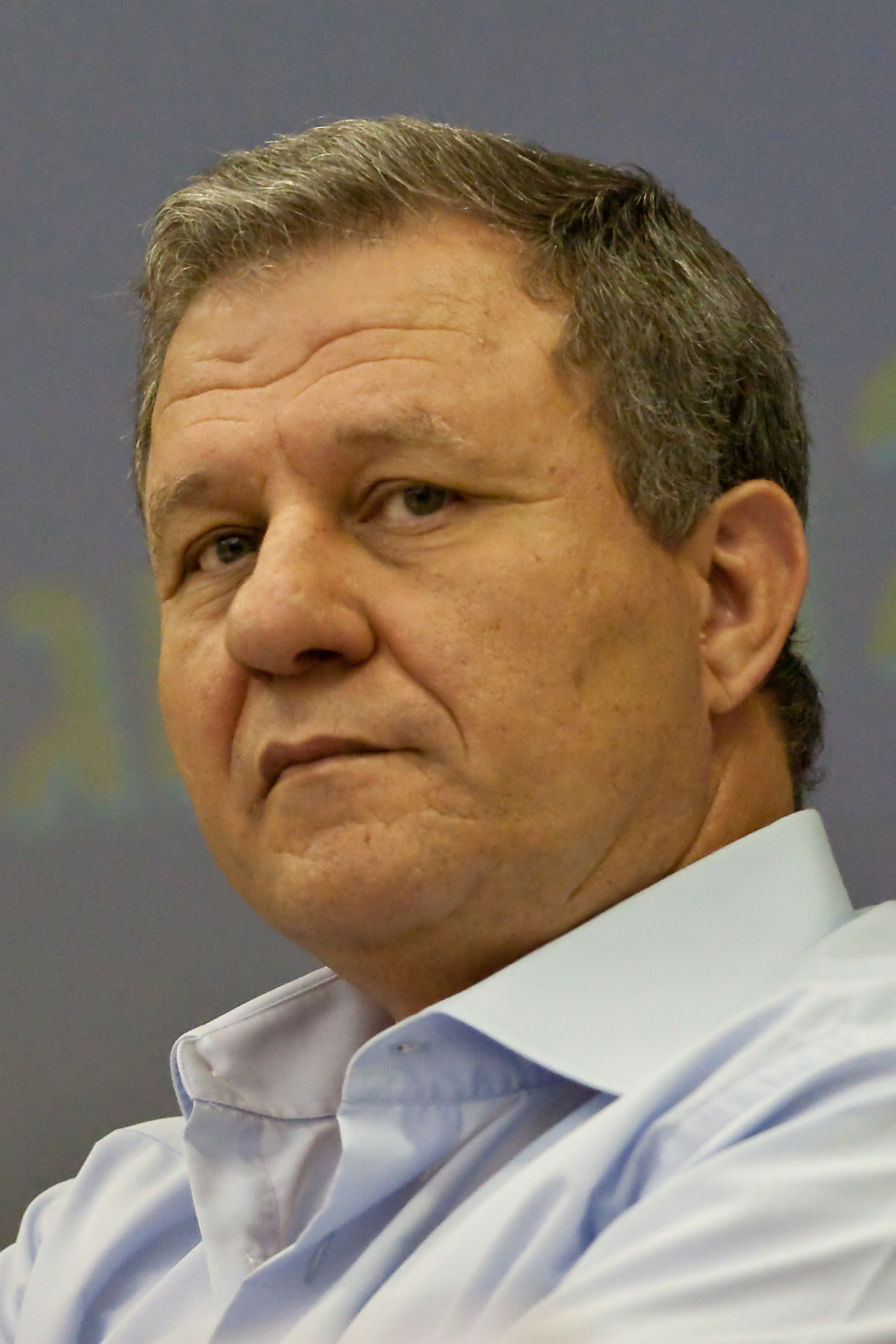
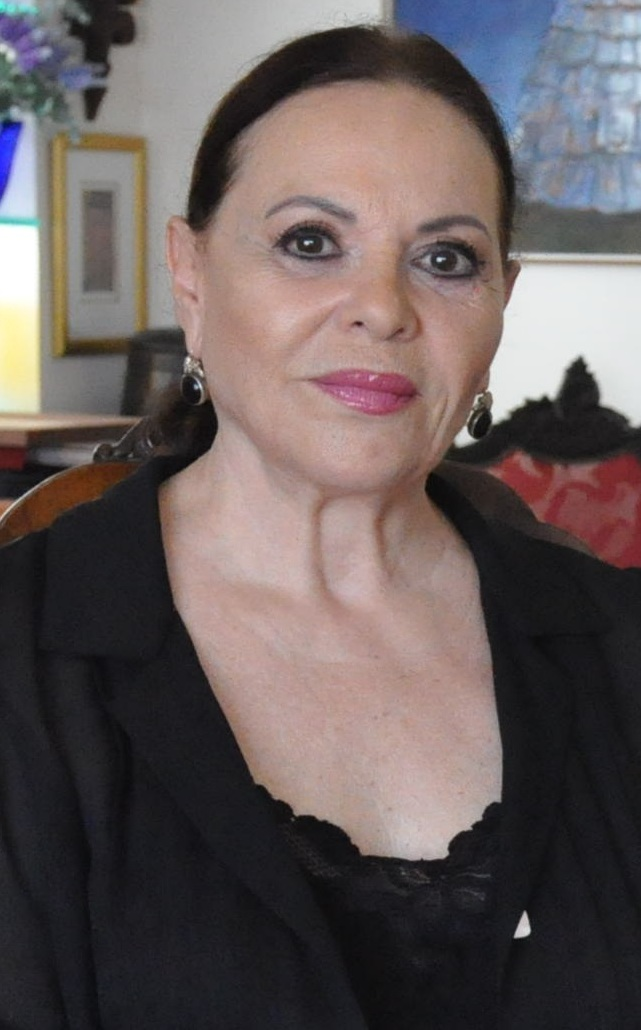
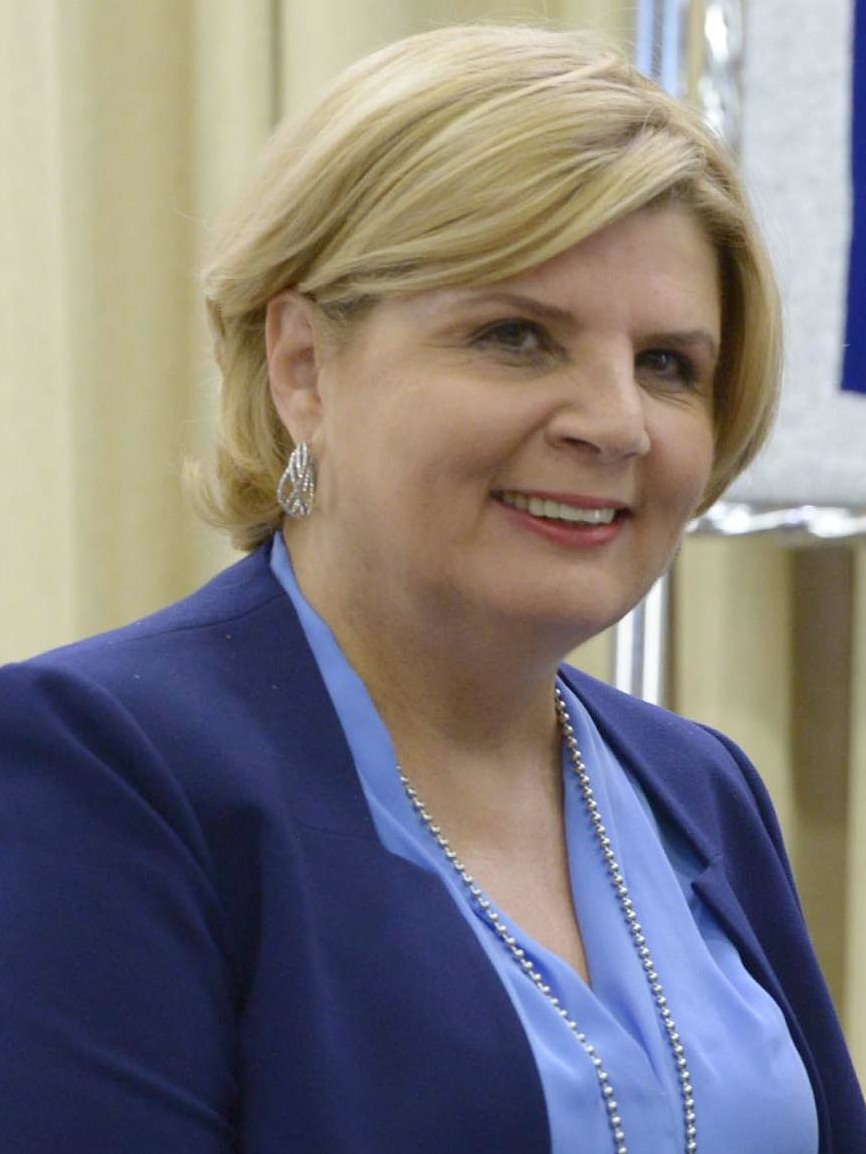
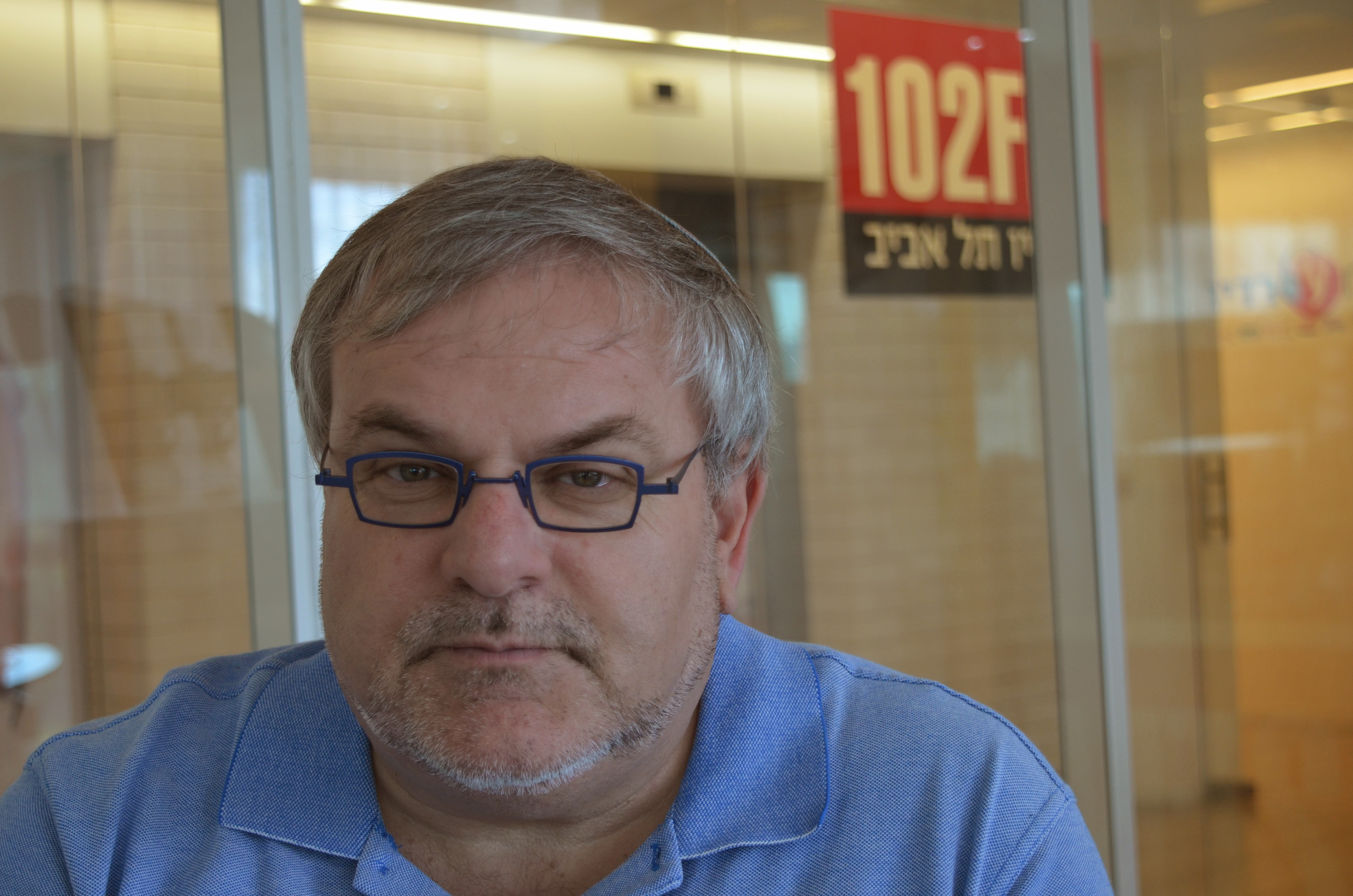
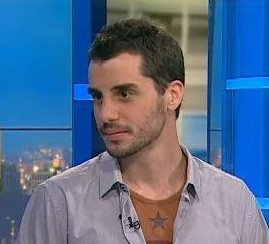
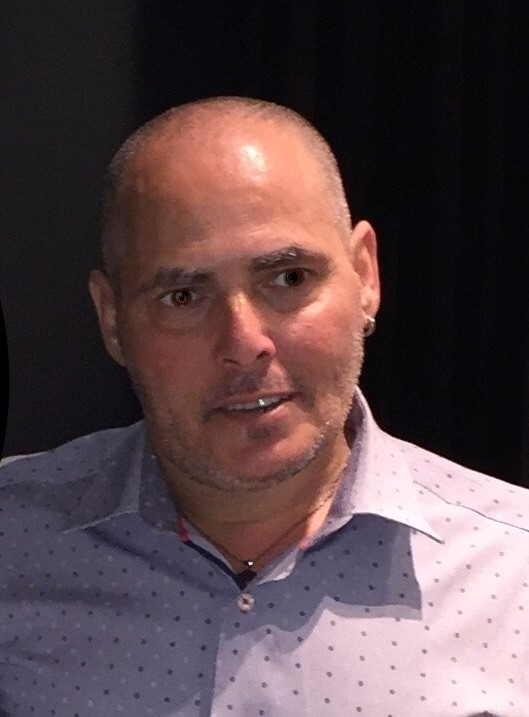
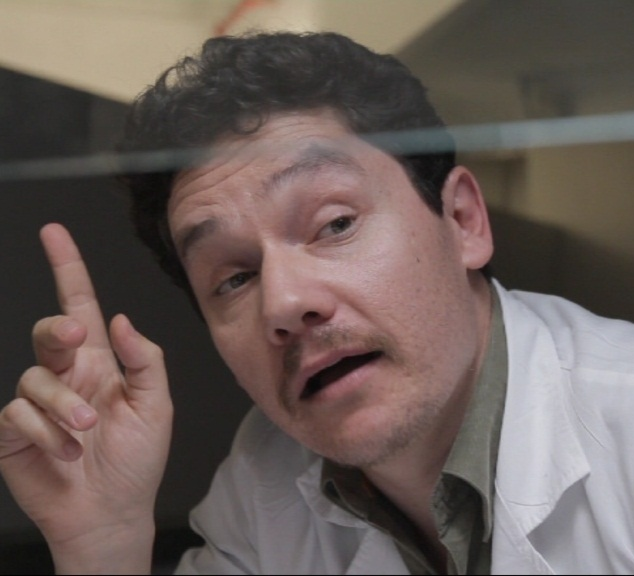
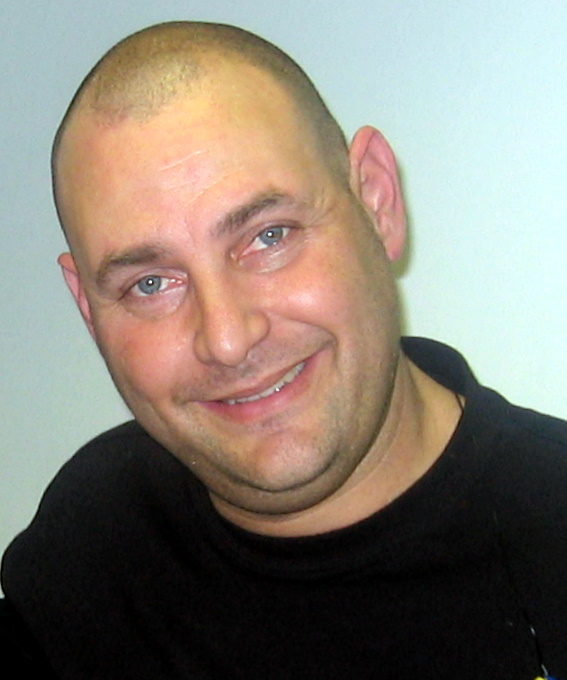
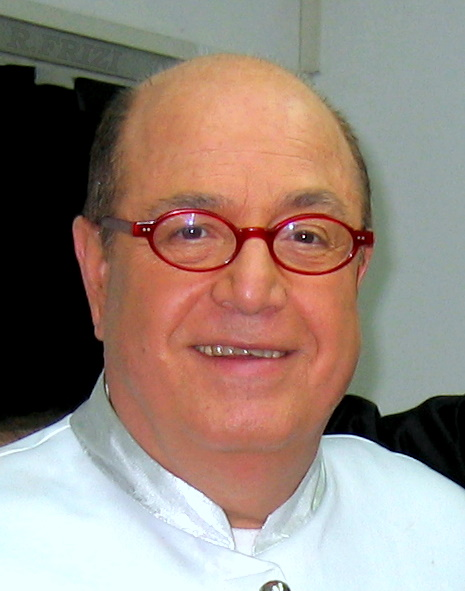
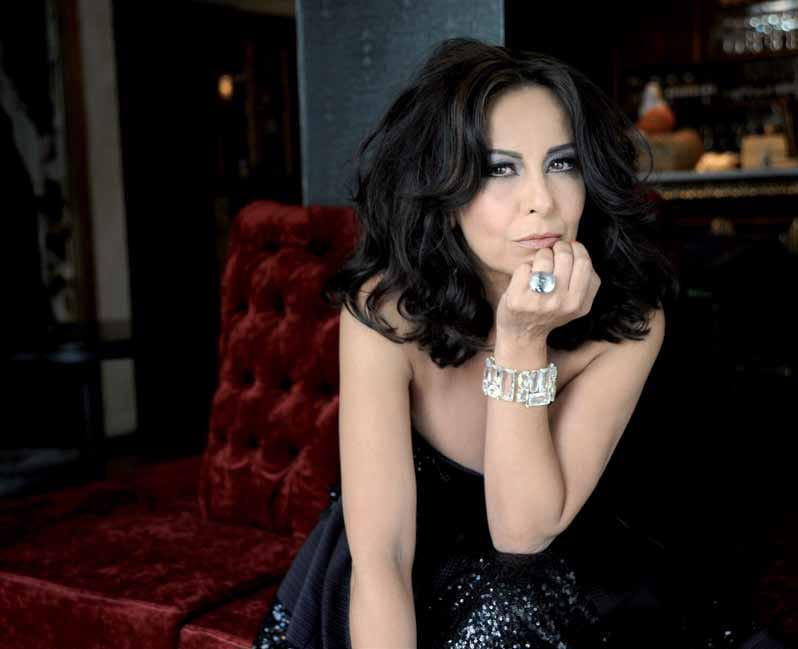
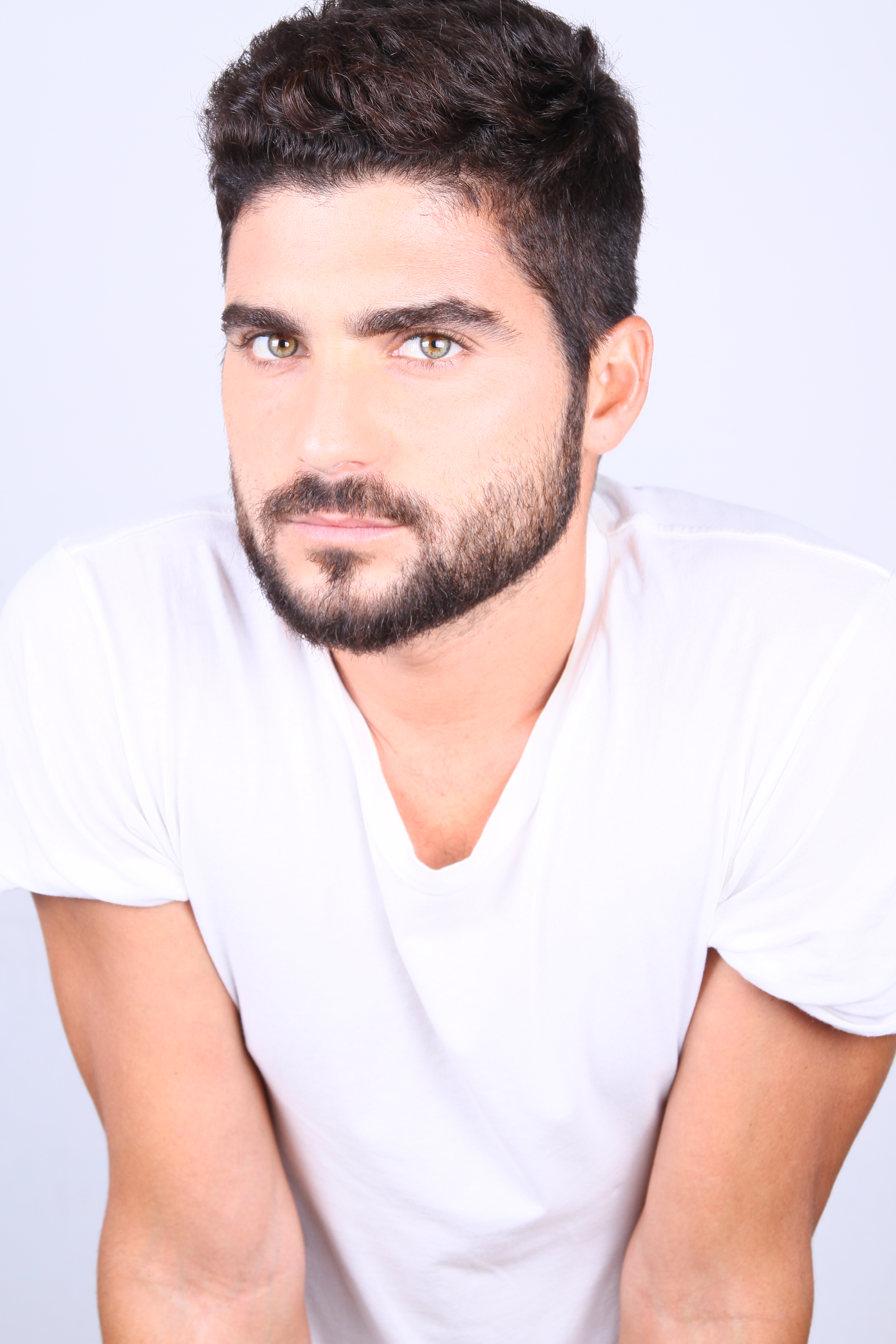
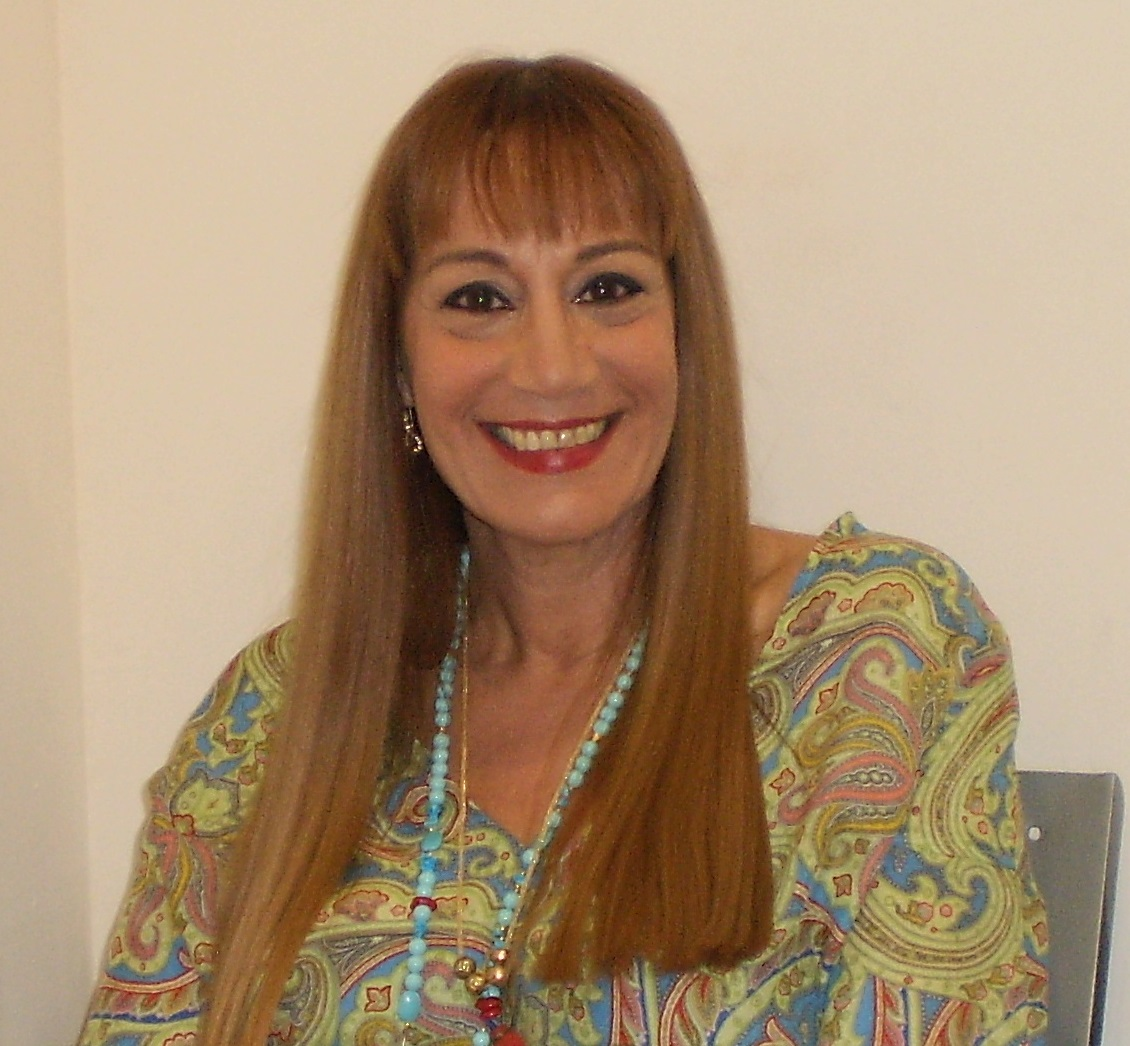
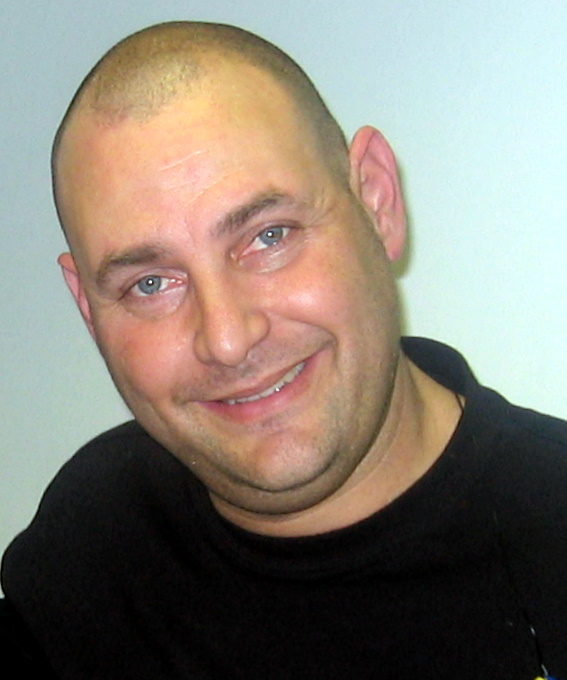
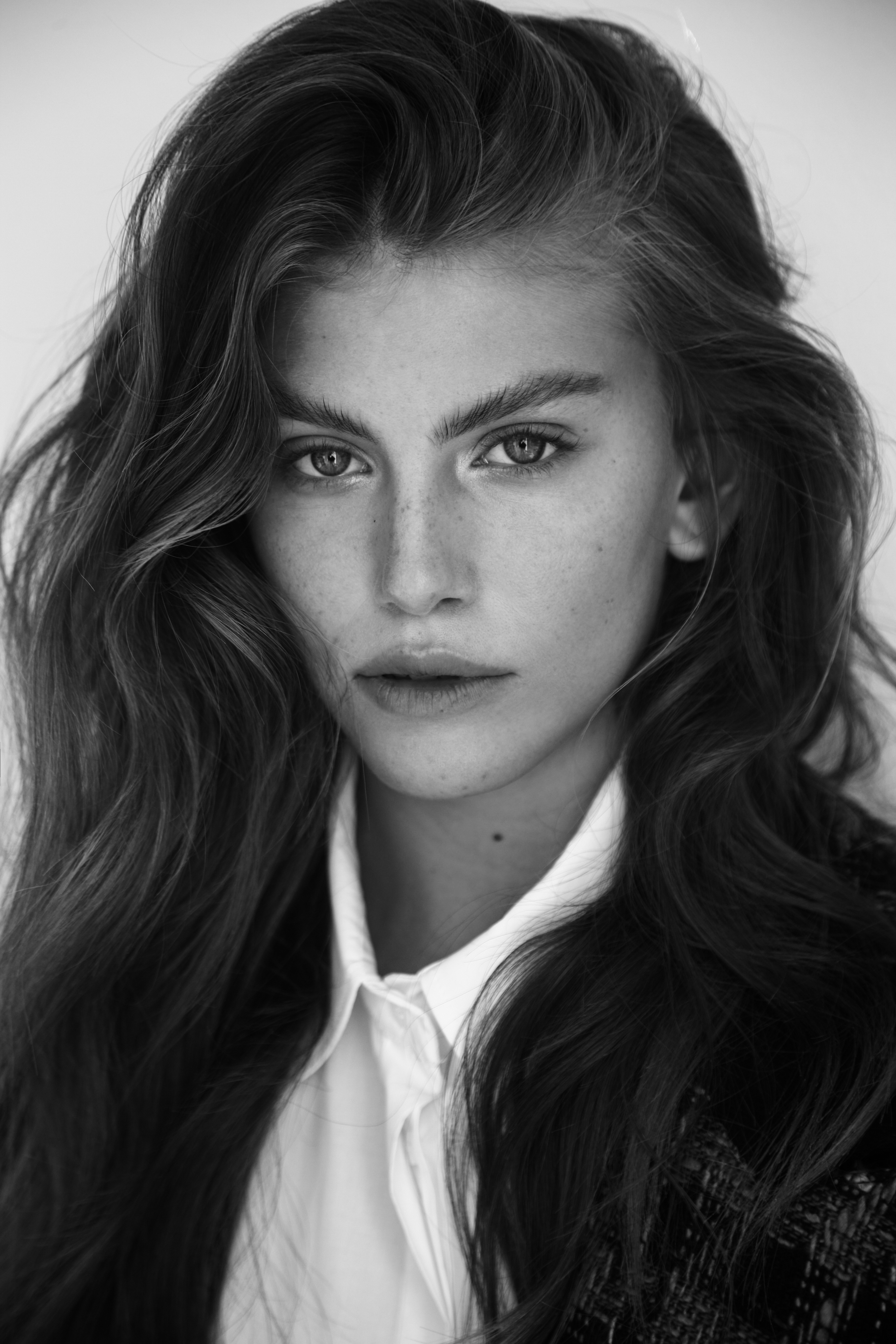
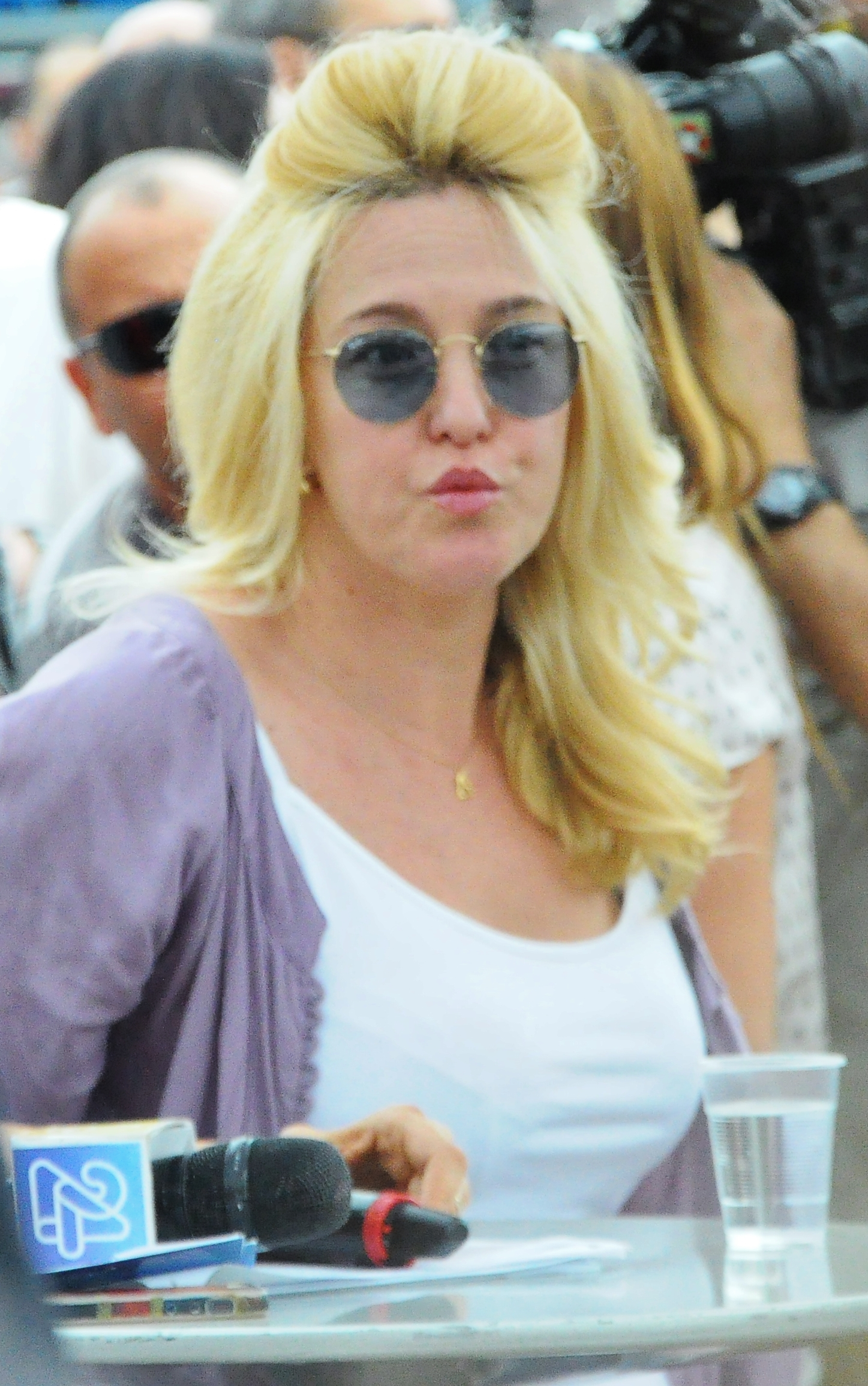
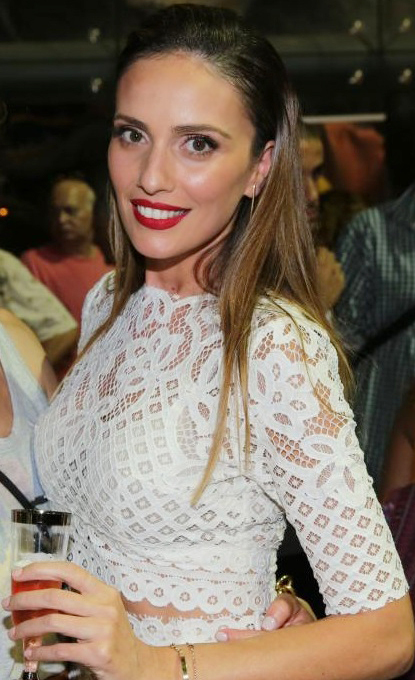
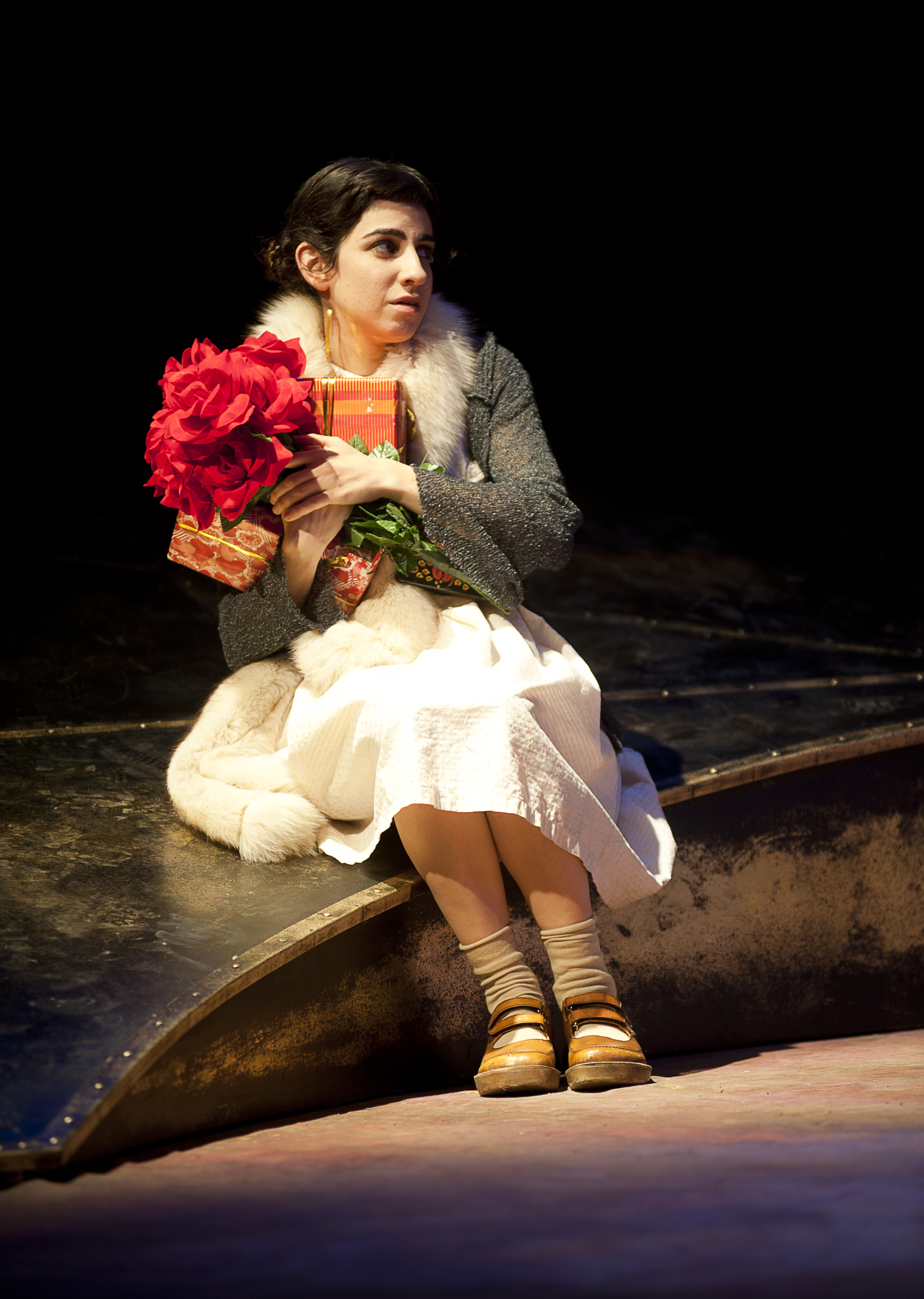
The celebrities who competed in the fourth season of The Singer in the Mask, pictured in order of elimination (l-r):

Yaron Berald ("Saturn"), Meir Sheetrit ("Mr. TV"), Gila Almagor ("Doll"), Orna Barbivai ("Broccoli"), Menachem Horowitz ("Watermelon"), Nadav Bornstein ("Bat"), Yishai Levi ("Pufferfish"), Avi Greinik ("Hurricane"), Zvika Hadar ("Two-Faced"), Tuvia Tzafir ("Monster"), Evelin Hagoel ("Panda"), Oshri Cohen ("Alpaca"), Miki Kam ("Bubblegum"), Zvika Hadar ("Sloth"), Taylor Malkov ("Panther"), Maya Dagan ("Butterfly"), Mali Levy ("Poodle"), Dana Ivgy ("Sufganiyah")

Not pictured: Lihi Griner ("Scarecrow")

Episodes

=== Week 1 (May 21) ===
Performances on the first episode
#	Stage name	Song	Identity	Result
1	Bubblegum	"Tattoo" by Loreen	undisclosed	SAFE
2	Alpaca	"Hello" by Lionel Richie	undisclosed	SAFE
3	Panda	"Proud Mary" by Creedence Clearwater Revival	undisclosed	SAFE
4	Bat	"Love Yourself" by Justin Bieber	undisclosed	SAFE
5	Saturn	"מלאך" by Aviv Geffen	Yaron Berald	OUT
6	Two-faced	"רונדלים" by Static / "פחד אלוהים" by Kfir Tsafrir	undisclosed	SAFE

=== Week 2 (May 25) ===
Performances on the second episode
#	Stage name	Song	Identity	Result
1	Sufganiyah	"Big Girls Cry" by Sia	undisclosed	SAFE
2	Watermelon	"Delilah" by Tom Jones	undisclosed	SAFE
3	Scarecrow	"Born This Way" by Lady Gaga	undisclosed	SAFE
4	Hurricane	"Hurricane" by Marina Maximilian	undisclosed	SAFE
5	Broccoli	"אולסטאר וגופיות" by Anna Zak	undisclosed	SAFE
6	Mr. TV	"The Winner Takes It All" by ABBA	Meir Sheetrit	OUT
7	Poodle	"Roar" by Katy Perry	undisclosed	SAFE

=== Week 3 (May 27) ===
Performances on the third episode
#	Stage name	Song	Identity	Result
1	Butterfly	"Always Remember Us This Way" by Lady Gaga	undisclosed	SAFE
2	Sloth	"The Lazy Song" by Bruno Mars	undisclosed	SAFE
3	Monster	"Feeling Good" by Michael Bublé	undisclosed	SAFE
4	Pufferfish	"מישהו שומע אותי" by Eifo HaYeled	undisclosed	SAFE
5	Doll	"Will You Love Me Tomorrow" by The Shirelles	Gila Almagor	OUT
6	Panther	"Blank Space" by Taylor Swift	undisclosed	SAFE

=== Week 4 - Disney Night (June 2) ===
Performances on the fourth episode
#	Stage name	Song	Identity	Result
1	Poodle	"Let It Go" from Frozen	undisclosed	SAFE
2	Hurricane	"Beauty and the Beast" from Beauty and the Beast	undisclosed	SAFE
3	Watermelon	"Hakuna Matata" from The Lion King	undisclosed	SAFE
4	Scarecrow	"Colors of the Wind" from Pocahontas	undisclosed	SAFE
5	Broccoli	"I'd Do Anything for Love (But I Won't Do That)" from Beauty and the Beast	Orna Barbivai	OUT
6	Sufganiyah	"Part of Your World" from The Little Mermaid	undisclosed	SAFE

=== Week 5 (June 4) ===
Performances on the fifth episode
#	Stage name	Song	Identity	Result
1	Sufganiyah	"No" by Meghan Trainor	undisclosed	SAFE
2	Hurricane	"Grenade" by Bruno Mars	undisclosed	SAFE
3	Scarecrow	"נאדי באדי" by Shahar Tavoch & Agam Buhbut	undisclosed	SAFE
4	Watermelon	"Can't Help Falling in Love" by Elvis Presley	Menachem Horowitz	OUT
5	Poodle	"Dernière danse" by Indila	undisclosed	SAFE

=== Week 6 (June 5) ===
Performances on the sixth episode
#	Stage name	Song	Identity	Result
1	Panda	"I'm Outta Love" by Anastacia	undisclosed	SAFE
2	Two-faced	"Beat It" by Michael Jackson	undisclosed	SAFE
3	Bat	"Total Eclipse of the Heart" by Bonnie Tyler	undisclosed	SAFE
4	Bubblegum	"יחפים" by Jasmin Moallem	undisclosed	SAFE
5	Alpaca	"אמיר דדון" by Amir Dadon	undisclosed	SAFE

=== Week 7 (June 8) ===
Performances on the seventh episode
#	Stage name	Song	Identity	Result
1	Panda	"Nana Banana" by Netta Barzilai	undisclosed	SAFE
2	Alpaca	"Never Enough" by Loren Allred	undisclosed	SAFE
3	Two-faced	"One Way Ticket" by Eruption	undisclosed	SAFE
4	Bat	"The Champion" by Carrie Underwood	Nadav Bornstein	OUT
5	Bubblegum	"Murder on the Dancefloor" by Sophie Ellis-Bextor	undisclosed	SAFE

=== Week 8 (June 11) ===
Performances on the eighth episode
#	Stage name	Song	Identity	Result
1	Monster	"אור הירח" by Aviv Geffen	undisclosed	SAFE
2	Panther	"עולה על שולחנות" by Marina Maximilian	undisclosed	SAFE
3	Sloth	"We Are Young" by Fun	undisclosed	SAFE
4	Pufferfish	"עומד על צוק" by Hi-Five	undisclosed	SAFE
5	Butterfly	"Careless Whisper" by George Michael	undisclosed	SAFE

=== Week 9 (June 18) ===
Performances on the ninth episode
#	Stage name	Song	Identity	Result
1	Sloth	"Tous les mêmes" by Stromae	undisclosed	SAFE
2	Butterfly	"Someone like You" by Adele	undisclosed	SAFE
3	Pufferfish	"לבחור נכון" by Amir Dadom	Yishai Levi	OUT
4	Panther	"Flowers" by Miley Cyrus	undisclosed	SAFE
-	Monster	Not Performed	undisclosed	N/A

=== Week 10 (June 24) ===
Performances on the tenth episode
#	Stage name	Song	Identity	Result
1	Scarecrow	"קח אותי" by Tom Patrober	undisclosed	SAFE
2	Poodle	"Lost on You" by LP	undisclosed	SAFE
3	Sufganiyah	"Out Here on My Own" by Irene Cara	undisclosed	SAFE
4	Hurricane	"השמלה החדשה שלי" by Ran Danker	Avi Greinik	OUT

=== Week 11 (June 28) ===
Performances on the eleventh episode
#	Stage name	Song	Identity	Result
1	Panda	"לוליטה" by Etti Ankri	undisclosed	SAFE
2	Two-faced	"אחלה גבר" by Static & Ben El Tavori and Dana International / "שלושה בנות" by Noa Kirel	Zvika Hadar	OUT
3	Bubblegum	"S&M" by Rihanna	undisclosed	SAFE
4	Alpaca	"Marry You" by Bruno Mars	undisclosed	SAFE

=== Week 12 (July 1) ===
Performances on the twelfth episode
#	Stage name	Song	Identity	Result
1	Sloth	"אהבה" by Osher Cohen	undisclosed	SAFE
2	Panther	"Money, Money, Money" by ABBA	undisclosed	SAFE
3	Butterfly	"I'm Still Standing" by Elton John	undisclosed	SAFE
4	Monster	"When a Man Loves a Woman" by Percy Sledge	Tuvia Tzafir	Disqualified

=== Week 13 - Eurovision Night (July 5/8) ===
Performances on the thirteenth and fourteenth episode
Ep.	#	Stage name	Country	Song	Identity	Result
13	1	Panda	Greece	"Sokrati" by Elpida	Evelin Hagoel	OUT
13	2	Panther	Cyprus	"Fuego" by Eleni Foureira	undisclosed	SAFE
13	3	Alpaca	Netherlands	"Arcade" by Duncan Laurence	undisclosed	SAFE
13	4	Sloth	Italy	"Nel blu, dipinto di blu" by Domenico Modugno	undisclosed	SAFE
13	5	Sufganiyah	Luxembourg	"Tu te reconnaîtras" by Anne-Marie David	undisclosed	SAFE
14	6	Bubblegum	Austria	"Rise Like a Phoenix" by Conchita Wurst	undisclosed	SAFE
14	7	Scarecrow	Denmark	"Only Teardrops" by Emmelie de Forest	undisclosed	SAFE
14	8	Poodle	Sweden	"Euphoria" by Loreen	undisclosed	SAFE
14	9	Butterfly	Switzerland	"Ne partez pas sans moi" by Celine Dion	undisclosed	SAFE

=== Week 14 (July 12/15) ===
Performances on the fifteenth episode
#	Stage name	Song	Identity	Result
1	Sloth	"מישבאלי" by Shahar Tavoch	undisclosed	SAFE
2	Panther	"On the Floor" by Jennifer Lopez and Pitbull	undisclosed	SAFE
3	Scarecrow	"My Immortal" by Evanescence	Lihi Griner	OUT
4	Poodle	"Vampire" by Olivia Rodrigo	undisclosed	SAFE

Performances on the sixteenth episode
#	Stage name	Song	Identity	Result
1	Alpaca	"Without You" by David Guetta	Oshri Cohen	OUT
2	Sufganiyah	"מסיבה בחיפה" by Itay Levy	undisclosed	SAFE
3	Bubblegum	"אינטלקטוערסית" by Odeya	undisclosed	SAFE
4	Butterfly	"Unicorn" by Noa Kirel	undisclosed	SAFE

=== Week 15 - Quarterfinals & Semifinal (19/20/26 July) ===
Performances on the seventeenth episode
#	Stage name	Song	Identity	Result
Round One
1	Bubblegum	"Break Free" by Ariana Grande	undisclosed	RISK
2	Butterfly	"Beautiful" by Christina Aguilera	undisclosed	RISK
3	Sufganiyah	"Hello" by Adele	undisclosed	SAFE
Round Two
1	Butterfly	"Fame" by Irene Cara	undisclosed	WIN
2	Bubblegum	"Fame" by Irene Cara	Miki Kam	OUT

Performances on the eighteenth episode
#	Stage name	Song	Identity	Result
Round One
1	Sloth	"אמן על הילדים" by Hanan Ben Ari	undisclosed	RISK
2	Panther	"Lose Control" by Teddy Swims	undisclosed	SAFE
3	Poodle	"Beautiful Things" by Benson Boone	undisclosed	RISK
Round Two
1	Sloth	"Valerie" by Amy Winehouse	Zvika Hadar	OUT
2	Poodle	"Valerie" by Amy Winehouse	undisclosed	WIN

Performances on the nineteenth episode
#	Stage name	Song	Identity	Result
1	Ofira & Panther	"Diva" by Dana International	GUEST	
2	Poodle	"Hopelessly Devoted to You" by Olivia Newton-John	undisclosed	SAFE
3	Butterfly	"We Are the Champions" by Queen	undisclosed	SAFE
4	Panther	"Applause" by Lady Gaga	Taylor Malkov	OUT
5	Sufganiyah	"My Heart Will Go On" by Celine Dion	undisclosed	SAFE

=== Week 16 - Final (29 July) ===
Performances on the final episode
#	Stage name	Song	Identity	Result
Round One
1	Butterfly	"I Have Nothing" by Whitney Houston	Maya Dagan	THIRD
2	Poodle	"Don't You Worry 'bout a Thing" by Stevie Wonder	undisclosed	SAFE
3	Sufganiyah	"It Must Have Been Love" by Roxette	undisclosed	SAFE
Round Two
1	Poodle	"Your Song" by Elton John	Mali Levy	RUNNER-UP
2	Sufganiyah	"Without You" by Mariah Carey	Dana Ivgy	WINNER

== Season 5 ==
Contestants

Stage Name	Celebrity	Occupation	Episodes											
Stage Name	Celebrity	Occupation	1	2	3	4	5	6	7	8	9	10/11	12/13	14
Stage Name	Celebrity	Occupation	A	B	C	A	B	C	B	A	C	10/11	12/13	14
Fire Ant	Eden Fines (Note: Fire Ant is revealed as 'Masked Insider' to the audience prior to the host and panelists finding out their identity.)	Model	SAFE			SAFE				SAFE		SAFE	SAFE	SAFE
Haifa Wild Boar	TBA				SAFE			SAFE			SAFE	WIN (Note: Additionally, after all the reunion performances were completed and before the elimination, each judge was asked to choose only one contestant to be the "Gold Card", which gave the mask a direct defense mechanism to not be part of the elimination, and to move directly to the next program.)	SAFE	
Impulsive Donkey	TBA			SAFE			SAFE		SAFE			WIN	WIN	SAFE
King of the Cassettes	TBA			SAFE			SAFE		SAFE			WIN	WIN	SAFE
Meerkat (WC)	TBA												WIN	
Porcelain Elephant	TBA			SAFE			SAFE		SAFE			WIN	WIN	
Strange Chicken	TBA		SAFE			SAFE				SAFE		SAFE	WIN	
Tomato (Note: The contestant is part of a group called "Salad".)	Liam Golan	Singer			SAFE			SAFE			SAFE	WIN	WIN	OUT
Fashionista	Bar Zomer	Model	SAFE			SAFE				SAFE		SAFE	OUT	
Pepper	Michal Ansky	Food Journalist			SAFE			SAFE			SAFE	OUT		
White Rabbit	Itay Shechter	Footballer			SAVED (Note: White Rabbit is saved from elimination only if the judges fail to guess his identity.)			SAVED			OUT			
Big Mouth	Nicky Goldstein	Actor	SAFE			SAFE				OUT				
Sacred Cow	Anna Aronov	Dancer		SAFE			SAFE		OUT					
Onion	Liraz Charhi	Actress			SAFE			OUT						
Strong Espresso	Eli Luzon	Singer		SAFE			OUT							
Sushi	Eli Ildis	TV Host	SAFE			OUT								
Crane	Dalia Mazor	TV Host			OUT									
Botox	Danielle Amit	Internet Personality		OUT										
Swan	Maya Bouskilla	Singer	OUT											

Episodes

=== Week 1 (October 17) ===
Performances on the first episode
#	Stage name	Song	Identity	Result
1	Strange Chicken	"עוף מוזר" by Pe'er Tasi	undisclosed	SAFE
2	Sushi	"Modern Love" by David Bowie	undisclosed	SAFE
3	Fashionista	"Just Keep Watching" by Tate McRae	undisclosed	SAFE
4	Swan	"Golden" by Huntrix	Maya Bouskilla	OUT
5	Big Mouth	"Ain't Your Mama" by Jennifer Lopez	undisclosed	SAFE
6	Fire Ant	"Girl on Fire" by Alicia Keys	undisclosed	SAFE

=== Week 2 (October 19) ===
Performances on the second episode
#	Stage name	Song	Identity	Result
1	Sacred Cow	"Back to Black" by Amy Winehouse / "תל אביב בלילה" by Eden Ben Zaken	undisclosed	SAFE
2	Botox	"Barbie Girl" by Aqua	Danielle Amit	OUT
3	King of the Cassettes	"הפרח בגני" (Note: King of the Cassettes performances are covers of the original songs in English.) by Avihu Medina	undisclosed	SAFE
4	Impulsive Donkey	"Abracadabra" by Lady Gaga	undisclosed	SAFE
5	Strong Espresso	"Espresso Macchiato" by Tommy Cash	undisclosed	SAFE
6	Porcelain Elephant	"Messy" by Lola Young	undisclosed	SAFE

=== Week 3 (October 24) ===
Performances on the third episode
#	Stage name	Song	Identity	Result
1	Onion	"Where Is My Husband!" by Raye	undisclosed	SAFE
2	Tomato	"Wrecking Ball" by Miley Cyrus	undisclosed	SAFE
3	Pepper	"Don't Start Now" by Dua Lipa	undisclosed	SAFE
4	Haifa Wild Boar	"I Will Survive" by Gloria Gaynor	undisclosed	SAFE
5	Crane	"(You Drive Me) Crazy" by Britney Spears	Dalia Mazor	OUT
6	White Rabbit	"חלליות" by Berry Sakharof	undisclosed	SAVED

=== Week 4 (October 26/28) ===
Performances on the fourth episode
#	Stage name	Song	Identity	Result
1	Fashionista	"פנתרה" / "מיליון דולר" by Noa Kirel	undisclosed	SAFE
2	Fire Ant	"Lay All Your Love on Me" by ABBA	undisclosed	SAFE
3	Sushi	"מלכת הדור" by Omer Adam	Eli Ildis	OUT
4	Big Mouth	"Oops!... I Did It Again" by Britney Spears	undisclosed	SAFE
5	Strange Chicken	"Shallow" by Lady Gaga and Bradley Cooper	undisclosed	SAFE

Performances on the fifth episode
#	Stage name	Song	Identity	Result
1	Porcelain Elephant	"APT." by Rosé and Bruno Mars	undisclosed	SAFE
2	Strong Espresso	"Die with a Smile" by Lady Gaga and Bruno Mars	Eli Luzon	OUT
3	Impulsive Donkey	"Impossible" by Shontelle	undisclosed	SAFE
4	Sacred Cow	"Milkshake" by Kelis	undisclosed	SAFE
5	King of the Cassettes	"שני משוגעים" by Omer Adam	undisclosed	SAFE

=== Week 5 (October 31/November 1) ===
Performances on the sixth episode
#	Stage name	Song	Identity	Result
1	Onion	"The Fate of Ophelia" by Taylor Swift	Liraz Charhi	OUT
2	Tomato	"Everybody (Backstreet's Back)" by Backstreet Boys	undisclosed	SAFE
3	Pepper	"I Like It" by Cardi B, Bad Bunny and J Balvin	undisclosed	SAFE
4	White Rabbit	"תשאירי לי מקום לחבק אותך" by Avtipus	undisclosed	SAVED
5	Haifa Wild Boar	"Tití Me Preguntó" by Bad Bunny	undisclosed	SAFE

Performances on the seventh episode
#	Stage name	Song	Identity	Result
1	Impulsive Donkey	"Livin' la Vida Loca" by Ricky Martin	undisclosed	SAFE
2	Porcelain Elephant	"Perfect" by Ed Sheeran	undisclosed	SAFE
3	Sacred Cow	"Believer" by Imagine Dragons	Anna Aronov	OUT
4	King of the Cassettes	"מה יהיה מחר" Pe'er Tasi	undisclosed	SAFE

=== Week 6 (November 3) ===
Performances on the eighth episode
#	Stage name	Song	Identity	Result
1	Fashionista	"פרפרים" by Odeya	undisclosed	SAFE
2	Strange Chicken	"A Million Dreams" by Ziv Zaifman, Hugh Jackman and Michelle Williams	undisclosed	SAFE
3	Big Mouth	"Hot n Cold" by Katy Perry	Nicky Goldstein	OUT
4	Fire Ant	"Dracula" by Tame Impala	undisclosed	SAFE

=== Week 7 - Liran Danino Duet Night (November 7) ===
Performances on the ninth episode
#	Stage name	Song	Identity	Result
1	Pepper & Liran Danino	"חלומות של אתמול" by Rachel Shapira / "Sweet Dreams (Are Made of This)" by Eurythmics	undisclosed	SAFE
2	Tomato & Liran Danino	"When I Was Your Man" by Bruno Mars	undisclosed	SAFE
3	Haifa Wild Boar & Liran Danino	"Lush Life" by Zara Larsson	undisclosed	SAFE
4	White Rabbit & Liran Danino	"היא יודעת" by Ninet Tayeb	Itay Shechter	OUT

=== Week 8 - Eurovision Night (November 8/10) ===
- Guests Judges: Noam Bettan, Yuval Raphael and Netta

Performances on the tenth and eleventh episode
Ep.	#	Stage name	Country	Song	Identity	Result
14	1	Impulsive Donkey	Bulgaria	"Bangaranga" by DARA	undisclosed	WIN
14	2	Pepper	Italy	"Soldi" by Mahmood	Michal Ansky	OUT
14	3	Haifa Wild Boar	Finland	"Cha Cha Cha" by Käärijä	undisclosed	WIN
14	4	Fashionista	Sweden	"Waterloo" by ABBA	undisclosed	SAFE
14	5	Tomato	Israel	"Michelle" by Noam Bettan	undisclosed	WIN
11	6	Porcelain Elephant	Germany	"Dschinghis Khan" by Dschinghis Khan	undisclosed	WIN
11	7	King of the Cassettes	Israel	"הלוואי" by Boaz Sharabi	undisclosed	WIN
11	8	Fire Ant	Sweden	"Heroes" by Måns Zelmerlöw	undisclosed	SAFE
11	9	Strange Chicken	Israel	"Toy" by Netta	undisclosed	SAFE

=== Week 9 - 80s Night (November 14/16) ===
Performances on the twelfth and thirteenth episode
Ep.	#	Stage name	Song	Identity	Result
12	1	King of the Cassettes	"נערי שובה אלי" by Margalit Tzan'ani	undisclosed	WIN
12	2	Impulsive Donkey	"Living on My Own" by Freddie Mercury	undisclosed	WIN
12	3	Tomato	"Billie Jean" by Michael Jackson	undisclosed	WIN
12	4	Strange Chicken	"ככלות הקול והתמונה" by Danni Bassan	undisclosed	WIN
12	5	Meerkat	"Eye of the Tiger" by Survivor	undisclosed	WIN
13	6	Porcelain Elephant	"I'm Still Standing" by Elton John	undisclosed	WIN
13	7	Fashionista	"Flashdance... What a Feeling" by Irene Cara	Bar Zomer	OUT
13	8	Fire Ant	"La Isla Bonita" by Madonna	undisclosed	SAFE
13	9	Haifa Wild Boar	"Brother Louie" by Modern Talking	undisclosed	SAFE

=== Week 10 (November 21) ===
Performances on the fourteenth episode
#	Stage name	Song	Identity	Result
1	Tomato	"One Last Time" by Ariana Grande	Liam Golan	OUT
2	King of the Cassettes	"רולקס וקסקט" by Eden Ben Zaken	undisclosed	SAFE
3	Impulsive Donkey	"Gasolina" by Daddy Yankee	undisclosed	SAFE
4	Fire Ant	"Valerie" by Mark Ronson feat. Amy Winehouse	undisclosed	SAFE
