= Traffic Light (TV series) =

2011 American TV sitcom

- Also known as: Mixed Signals
- Genre: Sitcom
- Based on: Ramzor by Adir Miller
- Developed by: Bob Fisher
- Starring: David Denman; Nelson Franklin; Kris Marshall; Liza Lapira; Aya Cash
- Music by: Jim Murphy
- Country of origin: United States
- Original language: English
- No. of seasons: 1
- No. of episodes: 13

Production
- Executive producers: Bob Fisher; David Hemingson; Elad Kuperman; Adir Miller; Avi Nir; Ran Sarig
- Producer: Barbara Black
- Cinematography: Joe Pennella; James R. Bagdonas
- Editors: David L. Bertman; John Murray
- Camera setup: Single-camera
- Running time: 21 minutes
- Production companies: Middletown News; Hemingson Entertainment; Keshet Broadcasting Ltd. Kuperman Productions; 20th Century Fox Television

Original release
- Network: Fox
- Release: February 8 – May 31, 2011

Related
- Ramzor

Traffic Light is an American sitcom television series that ran on Fox from February 8, 2011, to May 31, 2011. It is based on the Israeli television series Ramzor (Hebrew: רמזור, lit. "traffic light"; by Keshet Broadcasting Ltd.), and was adapted to an American audience by Bob Fisher. The series aired Tuesdays at 9:30 pm following Raising Hope as a mid-season replacement for Running Wilde.

On May 10, 2011, Fox cancelled the series after one season.

== Premise ==
Traffic Light revolves around three best friends since college, Mike, Adam, Ethan, who are now in their thirties. Each man finds himself in a different stage of life. Ethan is perpetually single, while Adam just moved in with his girlfriend, and Mike is married and has a son. The series follows the group as they try to balance their friendship with the different demands in each of their romantic relationships. The series is set in Chicago but was filmed in Los Angeles.

== Cast ==
=== Main ===
- David Denman as Mike Reilly
- Nelson Franklin as Adam
- Kris Marshall as Ethan Wright
- Liza Lapira as Lisa Reilly
- Aya Cash as Callie

=== Recurring ===
- Rob Huebel as Kev
- Janina Gavankar as Alexa
- Kathryn Hahn as Kate
- Blake Anderson as Tad

== Episodes ==
No.	Title	Directed by	Written by	Original release date	Prod. code	U.S. viewers (millions)
1	"Pilot"	Chris Koch	Bob Fisher; Adir Miller & Ran Sarig (original episode: Careful, My Wife is in the Car!)	February 8, 2011	1ASH79	4.589
2	"En Fuego"	Randall Einhorn	David King	February 15, 2011	1ASH08	3.487
3	"All the Precedent's Men"	Chris Koch	D. J. Nash	February 22, 2011	1ASH02	3.993
4	"Credit Balance"	Henry Chan	Lesley Wake Webster	March 2, 2011	1ASH05	7.320
5	"Breaking Bread"	Chris Koch	Lesley Wake Webster	March 8, 2011	1ASH10	3.821
6	"No Good Deed"	Rob Greenberg	Amy Hubbs & Tony Dodds	March 15, 2011	1ASH11	3.60
7	"Stealth Bomber"	Chris Koch	Robin Shorr	March 22, 2011	1ASH03	2.707
8	"Kiss Me Kate"	Richie Keen	Eric Siegel & Eric D. Wasserman	March 29, 2011	1ASH04	2.51
9	"Best Man"	Rebecca Asher	Donick Cary	April 12, 2011	1ASH09	2.24
10	"Bonebag"	Chris Koch	Donick Cary	April 19, 2011	1ASH06	3.09
11	"Where The Heart Is"	Chris Koch	Bob Fisher & David Hemingson	May 3, 2011	1ASH01	2.87
12	"Tommy Guns"	Henry Chan	Bob Fisher & David Hemingson	May 10, 2011	1ASH12	3.05
13	"Help Wanted"	Chris Koch	D. J. Nash	May 31, 2011	1ASH07	2.23

== Broadcast ==
In Italy, the series aired on Fox Italy.
