= The Singer in the Mask season 5 =

The Singer in the Mask
- Season 5
- Starring: Ofira Asayag; Shahar Hason; Tzedi Tzarfati; Bar Refaeli; Moshe Peretz
- Hosted by: Ido Rosenblum
- Winner: TBA
- Runner-up: TBA
- No. of episodes: 20

Release
- Original network: Channel 12

Season chronology
- ← Previous; Season 4

The fifth season of the Israeli version of The Singer in the Mask premiered on Channel 12 on 17 October 2026.

For the first time in the Israeli production, a contestant was revealed to the audience prior to the host and panelists finding out their identity. In this case, the Fire Ant was revealed to be Eden Fines without being eliminated.

== Panelists and host ==
Season 5 panelists and host

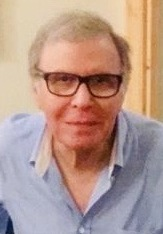
Tzedi Tzarfati

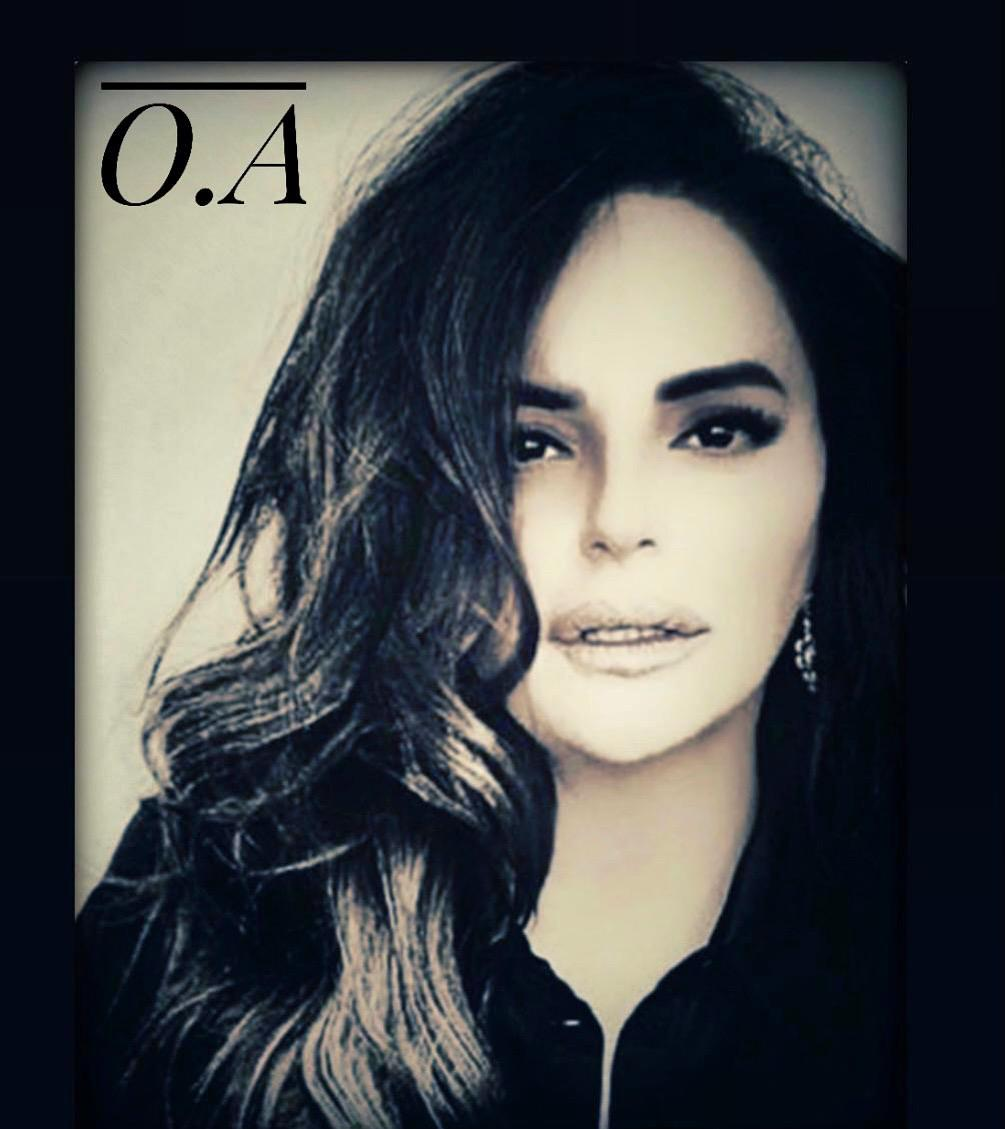
Ofira Asayag

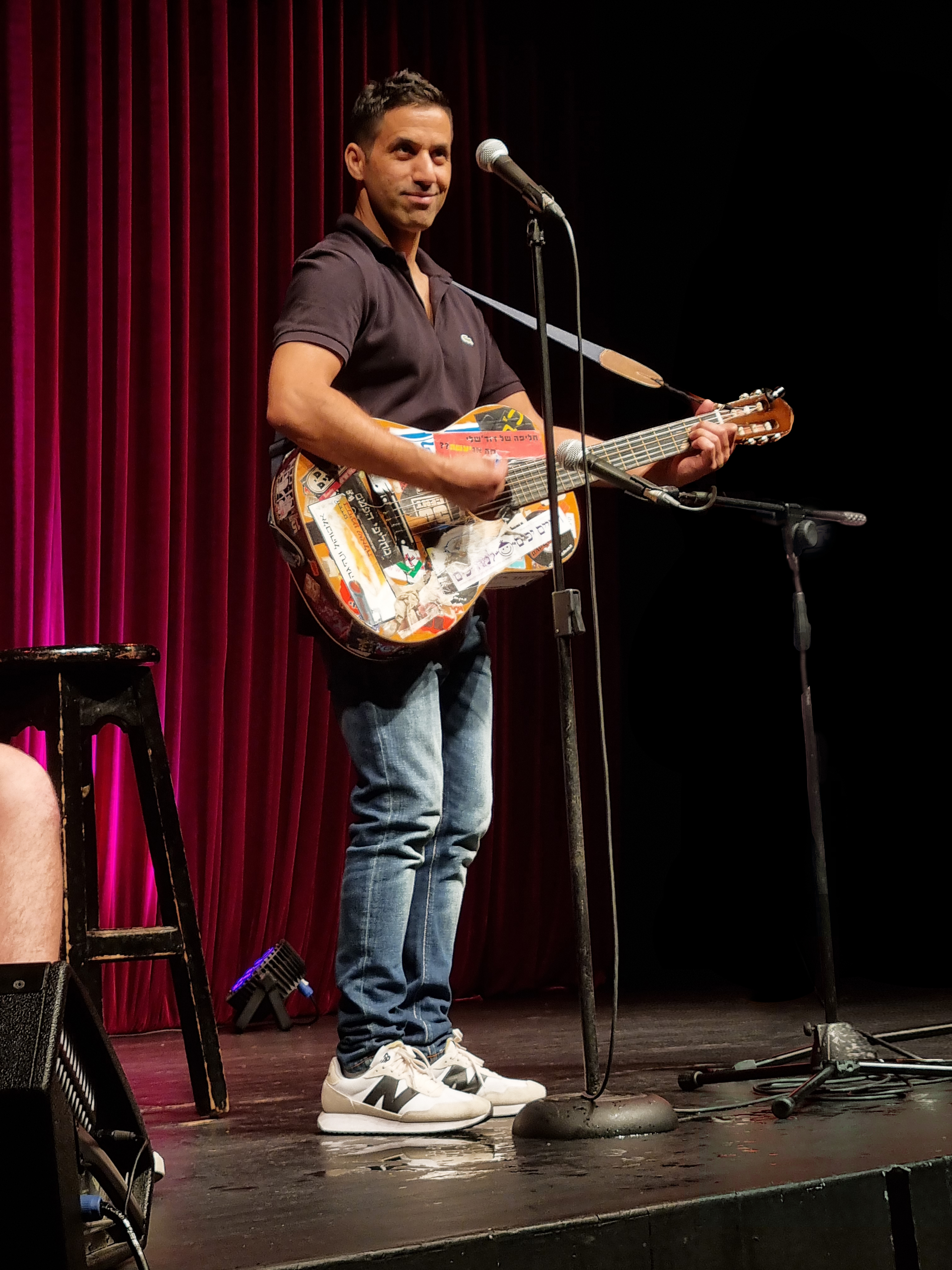
Shahar Hason

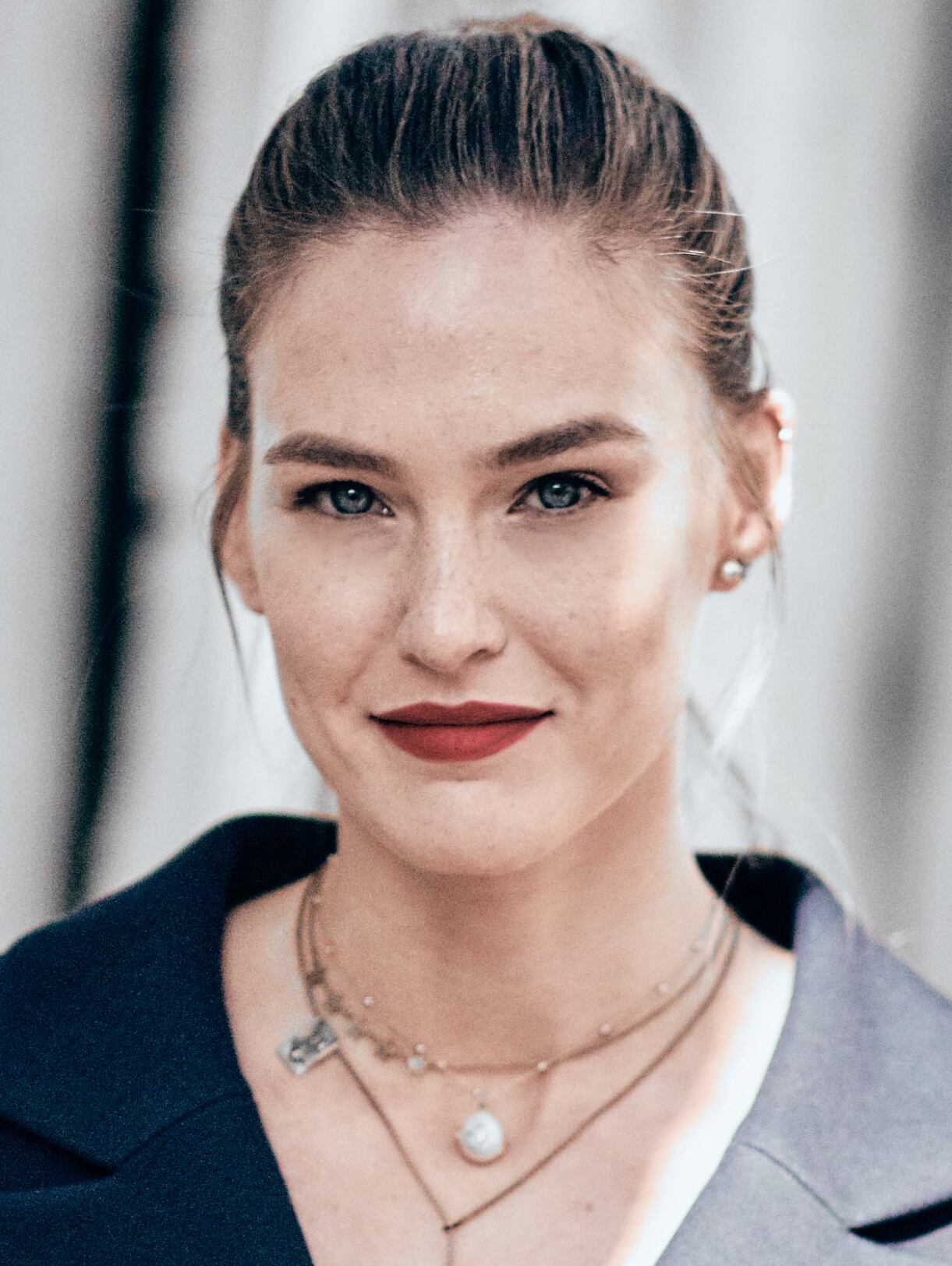
Bar Refaeli

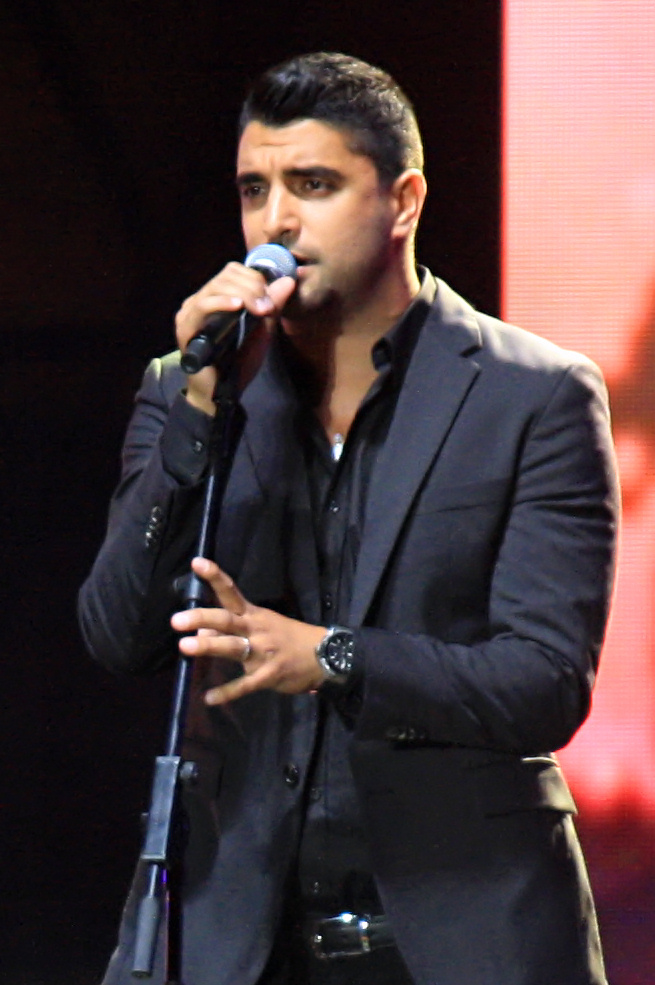
Moshe Peretz

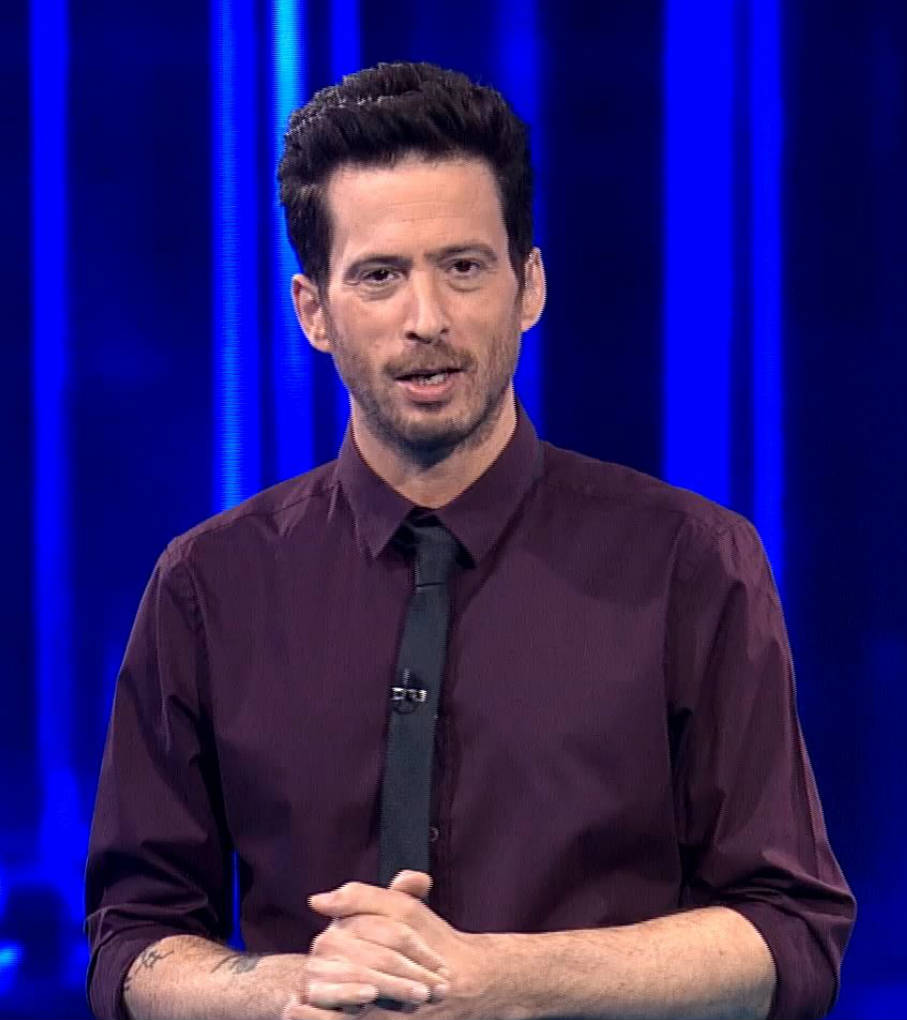
Ido Rosenblum

The show is hosted by the television presenter Ido Rosenblum, with the judging panel comprising the journalist Ofira Asayag, the comedian Shahar Hason, actress and model Bar Refaeli, singer Moshe Peretz, and the director Tzedi Tzarfati.

== Contestants ==
Stage Name	Celebrity	Occupation	Episodes											
Stage Name	Celebrity	Occupation	1	2	3	4	5	6	7	8	9	10/11	12/13	14
Stage Name	Celebrity	Occupation	A	B	C	A	B	C	B	A	C	10/11	12/13	14
Fire Ant	Eden Fines (Note: Fire Ant is revealed as 'Masked Insider' to the audience prior to the host and panelists finding out their identity.)	Model	SAFE			SAFE				SAFE		SAFE	SAFE	SAFE
Haifa Wild Boar	TBA				SAFE			SAFE			SAFE	WIN (Note: Additionally, after all the reunion performances were completed and before the elimination, each judge was asked to choose only one contestant to be the "Gold Card", which gave the mask a direct defense mechanism to not be part of the elimination, and to move directly to the next program.)	SAFE	
Impulsive Donkey	TBA			SAFE			SAFE		SAFE			WIN	WIN	SAFE
King of the Cassettes	TBA			SAFE			SAFE		SAFE			WIN	WIN	SAFE
Meerkat (WC)	TBA												WIN	
Porcelain Elephant	TBA			SAFE			SAFE		SAFE			WIN	WIN	
Strange Chicken	TBA		SAFE			SAFE				SAFE		SAFE	WIN	
Tomato (Note: The contestant is part of a group called "Salad".)	Liam Golan	Singer			SAFE			SAFE			SAFE	WIN	WIN	OUT
Fashionista	Bar Zomer	Model	SAFE			SAFE				SAFE		SAFE	OUT	
Pepper	Michal Ansky	Food Journalist			SAFE			SAFE			SAFE	OUT		
White Rabbit	Itay Shechter	Footballer			SAVED (Note: White Rabbit is saved from elimination only if the judges fail to guess his identity.)			SAVED			OUT			
Big Mouth	Nicky Goldstein	Actor	SAFE			SAFE				OUT				
Sacred Cow	Anna Aronov	Dancer		SAFE			SAFE		OUT					
Onion	Liraz Charhi	Actress			SAFE			OUT						
Strong Espresso	Eli Luzon	Singer		SAFE			OUT							
Sushi	Eli Ildis	TV Host	SAFE			OUT								
Crane	Dalia Mazor	TV Host			OUT									
Botox	Danielle Amit	Internet Personality		OUT										
Swan	Maya Bouskilla	Singer	OUT											

== Episodes ==
=== Week 1 (October 17) ===
Performances on the first episode
#	Stage name	Song	Identity	Result
1	Strange Chicken	"עוף מוזר" by Pe'er Tasi	undisclosed	SAFE
2	Sushi	"Modern Love" by David Bowie	undisclosed	SAFE
3	Fashionista	"Just Keep Watching" by Tate McRae	undisclosed	SAFE
4	Swan	"Golden" by Huntrix	Maya Bouskilla	OUT
5	Big Mouth	"Ain't Your Mama" by Jennifer Lopez	undisclosed	SAFE
6	Fire Ant	"Girl on Fire" by Alicia Keys	undisclosed	SAFE

=== Week 2 (October 19) ===
Performances on the second episode
#	Stage name	Song	Identity	Result
1	Sacred Cow	"Back to Black" by Amy Winehouse / "תל אביב בלילה" by Eden Ben Zaken	undisclosed	SAFE
2	Botox	"Barbie Girl" by Aqua	Danielle Amit	OUT
3	King of the Cassettes	"הפרח בגני" (Note: King of the Cassettes performances are covers of the original songs in English.)} by Avihu Medina	undisclosed	SAFE
4	Impulsive Donkey	"Abracadabra" by Lady Gaga	undisclosed	SAFE
5	Strong Espresso	"Espresso Macchiato" by Tommy Cash	undisclosed	SAFE
6	Porcelain Elephant	"Messy" by Lola Young	undisclosed	SAFE

=== Week 3 (October 24) ===
Performances on the third episode
#	Stage name	Song	Identity	Result
1	Onion	"Where Is My Husband!" by Raye	undisclosed	SAFE
2	Tomato	"Wrecking Ball" by Miley Cyrus	undisclosed	SAFE
3	Pepper	"Don't Start Now" by Dua Lipa	undisclosed	SAFE
4	Haifa Wild Boar	"I Will Survive" by Gloria Gaynor	undisclosed	SAFE
5	Crane	"(You Drive Me) Crazy" by Britney Spears	Dalia Mazor	OUT
6	White Rabbit	"חלליות" by Berry Sakharof	undisclosed	SAVED

=== Week 4 (October 26/28) ===
Performances on the fourth episode
#	Stage name	Song	Identity	Result
1	Fashionista	"פנתרה" / "מיליון דולר" by Noa Kirel	undisclosed	SAFE
2	Fire Ant	"Lay All Your Love on Me" by ABBA	undisclosed	SAFE
3	Sushi	"מלכת הדור" by Omer Adam	Eli Ildis	OUT
4	Big Mouth	"Oops!... I Did It Again" by Britney Spears	undisclosed	SAFE
5	Strange Chicken	"Shallow" by Lady Gaga and Bradley Cooper	undisclosed	SAFE

Performances on the fifth episode
#	Stage name	Song	Identity	Result
1	Porcelain Elephant	"APT." by Rosé and Bruno Mars	undisclosed	SAFE
2	Strong Espresso	"Die with a Smile" by Lady Gaga and Bruno Mars	Eli Luzon	OUT
3	Impulsive Donkey	"Impossible" by Shontelle	undisclosed	SAFE
4	Sacred Cow	"Milkshake" by Kelis	undisclosed	SAFE
5	King of the Cassettes	"שני משוגעים"} by Omer Adam	undisclosed	SAFE

=== Week 5 (October 31/November 1) ===
Performances on the sixth episode
#	Stage name	Song	Identity	Result
1	Onion	"The Fate of Ophelia" by Taylor Swift	Liraz Charhi	OUT
2	Tomato	"Everybody (Backstreet's Back)" by Backstreet Boys	undisclosed	SAFE
3	Pepper	"I Like It" by Cardi B, Bad Bunny and J Balvin	undisclosed	SAFE
4	White Rabbit	"תשאירי לי מקום לחבק אותך" by Avtipus	undisclosed	SAVED
5	Haifa Wild Boar	"Tití Me Preguntó" by Bad Bunny	undisclosed	SAFE

Performances on the seventh episode
#	Stage name	Song	Identity	Result
1	Impulsive Donkey	"Livin' la Vida Loca" by Ricky Martin	undisclosed	SAFE
2	Porcelain Elephant	"Perfect" by Ed Sheeran	undisclosed	SAFE
3	Sacred Cow	"Believer" by Imagine Dragons	Anna Aronov	OUT
4	King of the Cassettes	"מה יהיה מחר" by Pe'er Tasi	undisclosed	SAFE

=== Week 6 (November 3) ===
Performances on the eighth episode
#	Stage name	Song	Identity	Result
1	Fashionista	"פרפרים" by Odeya	undisclosed	SAFE
2	Strange Chicken	"A Million Dreams" by Ziv Zaifman, Hugh Jackman and Michelle Williams	undisclosed	SAFE
3	Big Mouth	"Hot n Cold" by Katy Perry	Nicky Goldstein	OUT
4	Fire Ant	"Dracula" by Tame Impala	undisclosed	SAFE

=== Week 7 - Liran Danino Duet Night (November 7) ===
Performances on the ninth episode
#	Stage name	Song	Identity	Result
1	Pepper & Liran Danino	"חלומות של אתמול" by Rachel Shapira / "Sweet Dreams (Are Made of This)" by Eurythmics	undisclosed	SAFE
2	Tomato & Liran Danino	"When I Was Your Man" by Bruno Mars	undisclosed	SAFE
3	Haifa Wild Boar & Liran Danino	"Lush Life" by Zara Larsson	undisclosed	SAFE
4	White Rabbit & Liran Danino	"היא יודעת" by Ninet Tayeb	Itay Shechter	OUT

=== Week 8 - Eurovision Night (November 8/10) ===
- Guests Judges: Noam Bettan, Yuval Raphael and Netta

Performances on the tenth and eleventh episode
Ep.	#	Stage name	Country	Song	Identity	Result
14	1	Impulsive Donkey	Bulgaria	"Bangaranga" by DARA	undisclosed	WIN
14	2	Pepper	Italy	"Soldi" by Mahmood	Michal Ansky	OUT
14	3	Haifa Wild Boar	Finland	"Cha Cha Cha" by Käärijä	undisclosed	WIN
14	4	Fashionista	Sweden	"Waterloo" by ABBA	undisclosed	SAFE
14	5	Tomato	Israel	"Michelle" by Noam Bettan	undisclosed	WIN
11	6	Porcelain Elephant	Germany	"Dschinghis Khan" by Dschinghis Khan	undisclosed	WIN
11	7	King of the Cassettes	Israel	"הלוואי" by Boaz Sharabi	undisclosed	WIN
11	8	Fire Ant	Sweden	"Heroes" by Måns Zelmerlöw	undisclosed	SAFE
11	9	Strange Chicken	Israel	"Toy" by Netta	undisclosed	SAFE

=== Week 9 - 80s Night (November 14/16) ===
Performances on the twelfth and thirteenth episode
Ep.	#	Stage name	Song	Identity	Result
12	1	King of the Cassettes	"נערי שובה אלי" by Margalit Tzan'ani	undisclosed	WIN
12	2	Impulsive Donkey	"Living on My Own" by Freddie Mercury	undisclosed	WIN
12	3	Tomato	"Billie Jean" by Michael Jackson	undisclosed	WIN
12	4	Strange Chicken	"ככלות הקול והתמונה" by Danni Bassan	undisclosed	WIN
12	5	Meerkat	"Eye of the Tiger" by Survivor	undisclosed	WIN
13	6	Porcelain Elephant	"I'm Still Standing" by Elton John	undisclosed	WIN
13	7	Fashionista	"Flashdance... What a Feeling" by Irene Cara	Bar Zomer	OUT
13	8	Fire Ant	"La Isla Bonita" by Madonna	undisclosed	SAFE
13	9	Haifa Wild Boar	"Brother Louie" by Modern Talking	undisclosed	SAFE

=== Week 10 (November 21) ===
Performances on the fourteenth episode
#	Stage name	Song	Identity	Result
1	Tomato	"One Last Time" by Ariana Grande	Liam Golan	OUT
2	King of the Cassettes	"רולקס וקסקט" by Eden Ben Zaken	undisclosed	SAFE
3	Impulsive Donkey	"Gasolina" by Daddy Yankee	undisclosed	SAFE
4	Fire Ant	"Valerie" by Mark Ronson feat. Amy Winehouse	undisclosed	SAFE
