= List of Ramzor episodes =

The following is an episode list for the Israeli sitcom Ramzor.

== Series overview ==
Season	Episodes	Originally released		Timeslot	Viewers (in thousands)
Season	Episodes	First released	Last released	Timeslot	Viewers (in thousands)
1	13	March 24, 2008	July 8, 2008	Monday 10:15 pm (March 24, 2008 – May 19, 2008); Tuesday 10:15 pm (May 27, 2008 – July 8, 2008)	424.3
2	13	August 4, 2009	November 9, 2009	Tuesday 10:15 pm (August 4, 2009 – October 20, 2009); Monday 10:15 pm (October 26, 2009 – November 9, 2009)	550.0
3	12	May 26, 2011	September 10, 2011	Thursday 9:45 pm (May 26, 2011 – July 14, 2011); Saturday 10:10 pm (July 30, 2011 – September 10, 2011)	744.3
4	13	April 3, 2014	July 3, 2014	Thursday 10:15 pm (April 3, 2014 – July 3, 2014)	778.8

=== Season 1 ===
No. overall	No. in season	Title	Directed by	Written by	Original release date	Israeli viewers (thousands)
1	1	"Dog Friend (חבר כלבה)"	Rani Saar	Adir Miller & Ran Sarig	516.8	March 24, 2008
Itsko is hurt by the fact that Amir only finds time to call him when he's walking his dog, Yardena, at night time.
2	2	"Parsley (פטרוזיליה)"	Rani Saar	Adir Miller & Ran Sarig	446.7	March 31, 2008
Tali constantly throws remarks at Amir and he decides he's had enough. Hefer borrows Daniel for a weekend in Eilat in order to get it going with a widow he's after.
3	3	"Pictures of Surfers (תמונות גולשים)"	Rani Saar	Adir Miller & Ran Sarig	382.2	April 7, 2008
Amir takes photos of Tali naked with his mobile phone and then loses it and becomes worried that Itsko, who is caught by Lilach watching porn, will upload them onto the Internet.
4	4	"Mega Friendly (מגה חברותית)"	Rani Saar	Adir Miller & Ran Sarig	394.7	April 14, 2008
Itsko is forced to change his swimming time to 6am. An old lady who has a chat with him at the pool is upset by him so decides to kick him. Tali sends Amir for too much grocery shopping and Hefer addresses that with him. Hefer goes out with a girl who had just returned from India and is worried about the rumors that are flying around as a result.
5	5	"The Painting (הציור)"	Rani Saar	Adir Miller & Ran Sarig	399.5	April 21, 2008
Itzko loses Daniele's painting and makes her another one. However the new painting causes Daniele's teacher send her to a young talents pictures contest.
6	6	"Bother me (מפריע לי)"	Rani Saar	Adir Miller & Ran Sarig	435.5	April 28, 2008
Tali, who works as an air hostess, invites a gay friend who works with her to her home and he ends up touching her in an ambiguous way. Hefer addresses the issue with Amir and Amir decides to deal with it.
7	7	"Mother Nature (מאמא טבע)"	Rani Saar	Adir Miller & Ran Sarig	485.3	May 12, 2008
Itsko and Lilach celebrate their 10th anniversary. Amir and Tali decide to send them to a vacation villa and sign the gift voucher with "mother nature". And Amir and Tali volunteer to look after Daniel.
8	8	"The Parking Officer (הפקח)"	Rani Saar	Adir Miller & Ran Sarig	345.5	May 19, 2008
Daniel performs in a show. Itsko doesn't want to pay for a parking in a parking lot and ends up getting into trouble with a parking officer.
9	9	"The Male Maid (העוזר)"	Rani Saar	Adir Miller & Ran Sarig	392.9	May 27, 2008
Tali hires a new housecleaner, who is male. Amir does not like him because of his demands (such as giving him lifts and cooking meals for him).
10	10	"Dogs Psychologist (פסיכולוגית כלבים)"	Rani Saar	Adir Miller & Ran Sarig	373.2	June 3, 2008
Tali invites a dogs psychologist for Yardena and asks Amir to join the sessions. Itzko confesses before his friends about a sexual performance issue, and Hefer volunteers to help.
11	11	"Funeral Clown (ליצן לוויות)"	Rani Saar	Adir Miller & Ran Sarig	437.5	June 10, 2008
Itsko, who owns a toy shop and has a clown act, fulfills a dead friend's request and performs in his funeral as a clown. The strange request turns into a start up business.
12	12	"Substitute Mother (אמא מחליפה)"	Rani Saar	Adir Miller & Ran Sarig	374.5	June 17, 2008
Amir discovers that his mother is going out with Dudi Kashk - former soldier of his, who was known as a crazy guy who liked older women. Amir is inconsolable. With the help of Hefer Amir goes on a venture of an eye for an eye and a mother for a mother. Itsko tries to save some money and brings a community service, ex-convict clown.
13	13	"Light Change (אורות מתחלפים)"	Rani Saar	Adir Miller & Ran Sarig	531.4	July 8, 2008
The males change their accumulative positions: Itsko becomes the "green light", Lilach decides that 17 years of marriage are quite enough for her and she decides to divorce Itsko. Amir decides to marry Tali and turns into the "red light". And Hefer decides he wants a long term relationship. Hefer chooses Shiri "bagage". Eventually each situation becomes quite bad: Itsko can't pick up any girls and Amir is sleeping all day.

=== Season 2 ===
No. overall	No. in season	Title	Directed by	Written by	Original release date	Israeli viewers (thousands)
14	1	"Careful, My Wife Is in the Car! (זהירות אשתי באוטו)"	Ohad Perach	Adir Miller & Ran Sarig	607.5	August 4, 2009
Hefer explains to Amir that if he wants to hangout he has to give his girl the impression it's a laborious obligation. Itsko discovers the speaker phone in the car is a precarious device when your wife is present.
15	2	"Kululu (קולולו)"	Ohad Perach	Adir Miller & Ran Sarig	569.1	August 11, 2009
Tali drops a bomb on Amir: her Libyan grandmother intends to make the kululu sounds during their wedding (a celebratory yelling custom among Mizrahi Jews), and she's arriving with her sisters. Hefer has a ravishing night with Shiri "baggage" after which she disappears.
16	3	"To Feel Middle-Aged (להרגיש מבוגר)"	Ohad Perach	Adir Miller & Ran Sarig	490.5	August 18, 2009
During an outing at a club Amir discovers that he "dances like a middle aged person at a weddings". And it is exacerbated when a waitress addresses him as "Sir". Hefer realizes that it is impossible to separate from Shiri 'baggage'.
17	4	"Handyman (הנדימן)"	Ohad Perach	Adir Miller & Ran Sarig	455.6	August 25, 2009
Amir fails to assemble an Ikea shelf. Amos the hot neighbor, assembles the shelf in minutes, right in front of Tali. Amir sets out to defend his masculinity. Hefer goes out with the news sign language woman and exploits it to his advantage.
18	5	"Chain Mail (מייל שרשרת)"	Ohad Perach	Adir Miller & Ran Sarig	542.0	September 1, 2009
Amir tries to get away with not picking up his dogs feces and gets in trouble with a neighbor from hell. Hefer receives a chain e-mail which threatens with a curse if you don't pass it on. He disregardingly erases the e-mail.
19	6	"Homework (שיעורי בית)"	Ohad Perach	Adir Miller & Ran Sarig	526.2	September 8, 2009
Itsko helps Daniel with her math homework and makes a mistake while doing so. Daniel loses her faith in her father and Itsko sets out to win it back.
20	7	"Replacement Woman (אישה מחליפה)"	Ohad Perach	Adir Miller & Ran Sarig	558.7	September 22, 2009
Amir notices that every time he buys Tali a gift she replaces it. Even the replacement slip is replaced. Hefer goes out with an overly enthusiastic drama student. The couples therapist sends Itsko on a mission - to cause Lilach to get jealous.
21	8	"Eilat (אילת)"	Ohad Perach	Adir Miller & Ran Sarig	598.0	September 29, 2009
The entire gang go down to Eilat for a vacation. What will happen when Amir will learn that Tali is in her period just when they're on vacation? When Lilach will discover that Tali and Amir's room is better, and Hefer will find himself stuck without cash to pay for the call girl he order...?
22	9	"Supermarket Criminal (עבריין סופר)"	Ohad Perach	Adir Miller & Ran Sarig	491.3	October 6, 2009
Itsko is hungry, and engages in his usual habit of "sampling" the supermarket food, however the supermarket's management decides to put a stop to the habit. Amir and Tali discover that she can't stand his friends nor he hers. They decide to find new couple friends that will belong only to them. Hefer decides to save a bit by disconnecting from the cable company. But the cable company refuses to disconnect from him.
23	10	"Lady Sense (ליידי סנס)"	Ohad Perach	Adir Miller & Ran Sarig	630.3	October 13, 2009
The erotic channel is airing movies for 48 hours free, and so Itsko will do anything to send Lilach to bed. Hefer meets a new girl and almost falls in love until Amir draws his attention to a small speech defect of hers. Amir wants Tali to start taking part in the expenses. He's sick of depositing so as Tali will withdraw.
24	11	"Raising Expectations (מרים הרף)"	Ohad Perach	Adir Miller & Ran Sarig	536.6	October 20, 2009
Amir and Tali are visiting Oshik and Smadar. Oshik clears the table, washes the dishes, and serves cake before Tali envious eyes. Amir asks Oshik to stop raising the bar. Daniel returns home with a bite on her hand. Itsko and Hefer go to the school and threaten the kid, but to their misfortune they fall on the wrong kid to mess with.
25	12	"Nightlife (חיי לילה)"	Ohad Perach	Adir Miller & Ran Sarig	572.6	October 26, 2009
Hefer realizes he is too old for night clubs and starts looking for love in his age group. Meanwhile Amir is tired of being Tali's driver, but is not willing to give up on his last bit of independence: his car.
26	13	"How much to give? (?כמה לתת)"	Ohad Perach	Adir Miller & Ran Sarig	571.7	November 9, 2009
Amir and Tali's wedding day is coming and everything goes wrong: Amir accidentally swallows his tooth crown and has to use a 5 year old girl's crown as a quick replacement, Hefer is trying to get out of debt and starts dating a 50-year-old millionaire woman, and Itsko is getting nervous from the gift cheque he needs to give for the wedding.

=== Season 3 ===
No. overall	No. in season	Title	Directed by	Written by	Original release date	Israeli viewers (thousands)
27	1	"Dr. Shedma (ד"ר שדמה)"	Ohad Perach	Adir Miller & Ran Sarig	514.8	May 26, 2011
Hefer is getting richer because of his new girlfriend, and he wants to get married, but something happens that makes him unhappy. Tali and Amir are having a baby, and their doctor really hates Amir.
28	2	"Coleslaw (קולסלאו)"	Ohad Perach	Adir Miller & Ran Sarig	725.3	June 2, 2011
Tali wants to move from the city to a village (moshav) so Amir and Tali are trying to get accepted to a kibutz. Hefer breaks up from Dalia his rich girlfriend. Itzko divorces from Lilah.
29	3	"Who saved you? (?מי הציל אותך)"	Ohad Perach	Adir Miller & Ran Sarig	706.8	June 9, 2011
Hefer's old friend comes to stay at Hefer's house because his wife threw him out from the house. Hefer can't refuse because he saved his life in the army in Lebanon. Tali is exaggerating with the shopping for the new baby while she is still pregnant and only in the second month. Danielle has a birthday and she decides that her parents should buy her two expensive gifts because they are divorced.of course Itzko is not OK with it. Hefer is trying to save his old friend's life to be compared with him.
30	4	"Flowers for Elisha (פרחים לאלישע)"	Ohad Perach	Adir Miller & Ran Sarig	649.8	June 16, 2011
Hefer takes care of his old neighbor because he is allowed to use medical marijuana. Itzko and Lilah are back together. Amir feels that he and Tali are acting like dudes.
31	5	"Genetic Counseling (ייעוץ גנטי)"	Ohad Perach	Adir Miller & Ran Sarig	718.9	June 23, 2011
Amir and Tali are going to genetic counseling, and Amir wants to check if the baby will have the bad habits of Tali's family. Hefer has a new girlfriend, but he doesn't know she is Arab. Itzko's daughter, Daniel, has a new boyfriend, and Itzko doesn't like him.
32	6	"She doesn't let him rest (לא נותנת מנוח)"	Ohad Perach	Adir Miller & Ran Sarig	818.8	June 30, 2011
Amir thinks that Tali can't watch him rest and therefore she gives him jobs to do in the house. Lilach tells Itsko she doesn't want Hefer to use their toilets.
33	7	"Hormone Tali (טלי הורמונאלי)"	Ohad Perach	Adir Miller & Ran Sarig	743.2	July 7, 2011
Tali is under the influence of hormones and it makes Amir crazy. Lilach wants Itsko to buy her a very expensive couch. Itsko is going pays for a faker to build it. Hefer is faking deaf and asking people for money in the cafe.
34	8	"Handicapped's Tag (תו נכה)"	Ohad Perach	Adir Miller & Ran Sarig	694.2	July 14, 2011
35	9	"The Nutritionist (התזונאי)"	Ohad Perach	Adir Miller & Ran Sarig	842.7	July 30, 2011
Amir is getting fat and when Tali sends him to a strict nutritionist who constantly insult Amir in order to motivate him, Amir gets boring and depressed. Hefer can't stand the new "Aroma" cafe opened under his apartment and fights in order to change its loud service routine. Itzko is trying to get a foreign passport following Mahmoud Ahmadinejad's threats for nuclear bomb on Israel, and tries his luck at the Polish embassy.
36	10	"Test in Shlomi (טסט בשלומי)"	Ohad Perach	Adir Miller & Ran Sarig	804.7	August 13, 2011
Hefer needs to complete a driving test after his driving licence got banned, and try his luck at a small town up north where he finds the residents extremely annoying. Tali makes an accident with the family's car and when Amir get conned at the garage for being "Ashkenazi" he enters the tough world of the garages. Lilach is donating to an African refugee but is more than furious when Itzko donates her Prada dress.
37	11	"Falafel Friend (חבר פלאפל)"	Ohad Perach	Adir Miller & Ran Sarig	772.6	August 20, 2011
Amir is worried of the friendship tied between him and a Falafel store clerk and is anxious to set up lines. Hefer dates an obsessed blogger who reveals all of his secrets online. Lilach forces Itzko to go to a cosmetic in honour for her annual reports meeting but things are getting messy.
38	12	"Name for the baby (שם לתינוק)"	Ohad Perach	Adir Miller & Ran Sarig	931.0	September 10, 2011
Season finale. Tali is about to give birth and the couple are arguing about the name, an argue which soon all the family take part in. Hefer is hitting on a nurse in the hospital and gets hospitalized. Lilach and Itzko take care of Yardena, Tali's dog.

=== Season 4 ===
No. overall	No. in season	Title	Directed by	Written by	Original release date	Israeli viewers (thousands)
39	1	"The Ferret (החמוס)"	Ohad Perach	Adir Miller & Ran Sarig	953.2	April 3, 2014
40	2	"Reducing Arrivals (צמצום הגעות)"	Ohad Perach	Adir Miller & Ran Sarig	790.5	April 10, 2014
41	3	"Cigarette Break (הפסקת סיגריה)"	Ohad Perach	Adir Miller & Ran Sarig	761.1	April 24, 2014
42	4	"Sex Because We Have To (סקס כי צריך)"	Ohad Perach	Adir Miller & Ran Sarig	815.8	May 1, 2014
43	5	"Bad Luck Hagit (חגית המנחסת)"	Ohad Perach	Adir Miller & Ran Sarig	843.4	May 8, 2014
44	6	"An Operation in Gaza (מבצע בעזה)"	Ohad Perach	Adir Miller & Ran Sarig	923.7	May 15, 2014
45	7	"The Sausage (הנקניק)"	Ohad Perach	Adir Miller & Ran Sarig	581.9	May 22, 2014
46	8	"Buying an Apartment (לקנות דירה)"	Ohad Perach	Adir Miller & Ran Sarig	715.5	May 29, 2014
47	9	"Stupid Diaper (חיתול מהבול)"	Ohad Perach	Adir Miller & Ran Sarig	734.1	June 5, 2014
48	10	"Living with a Shift Manager (לגור עם אחמ"שית)"	Ohad Perach	Adir Miller & Ran Sarig	829.6	June 12, 2014
49	11	"Nanny Sima (המטפלת סימה)"	Ohad Perach	Adir Miller & Ran Sarig	659.3	June 19, 2014
50	12	"Hefer Gets a Degree (חפר מוציא תואר)"	Ohad Perach	Adir Miller & Ran Sarig	723.3	June 26, 2014
51	13	"Yardena's First Birthday (יום הולדת שנה לירדנה)"	Ohad Perach	Adir Miller & Ran Sarig	793.3	July 3, 2014
