= The Singer in the Mask season 4 =

The Singer in the Mask
- Season 4
- Starring: Ofira Asayag; Shahar Hason; Tzedi Tzarfati; Static
- Hosted by: Ido Rosenblum
- Winner: Dana Ivgy as "Sufganiyah"
- Runner-up: Mali Levi as "Poodle"
- No. of episodes: 20

Release
- Original network: Channel 12
- Original release: 21 May – 29 July 2025

Season chronology
- ← Previous; Season 3 Next → Season 5

The fourth season of the Israeli version of The Singer in the Mask premiered on Channel 12 on 21 May 2025 and concluded on 29 July 2025. The series was won by actress Dana Ivgy as "Sufganiyah" with actress Mali Levi finishing second as "Poodle" and actress Maya Dagan finishing third as "Butterfly".

== Panelists and host ==
Season 4 panelists and host

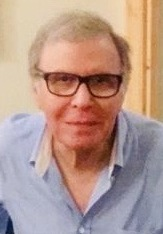
Tzedi Tzarfati

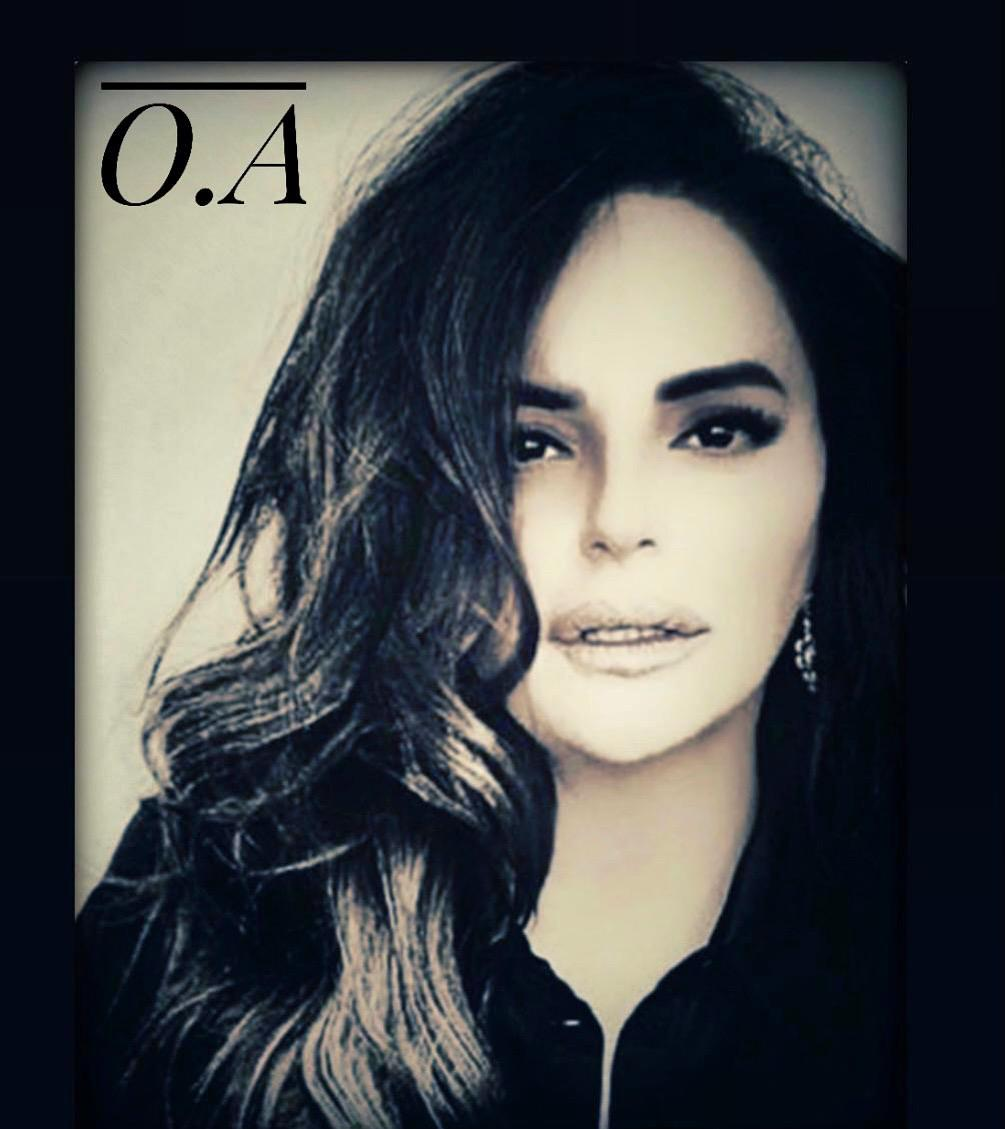
Ofira Asayag

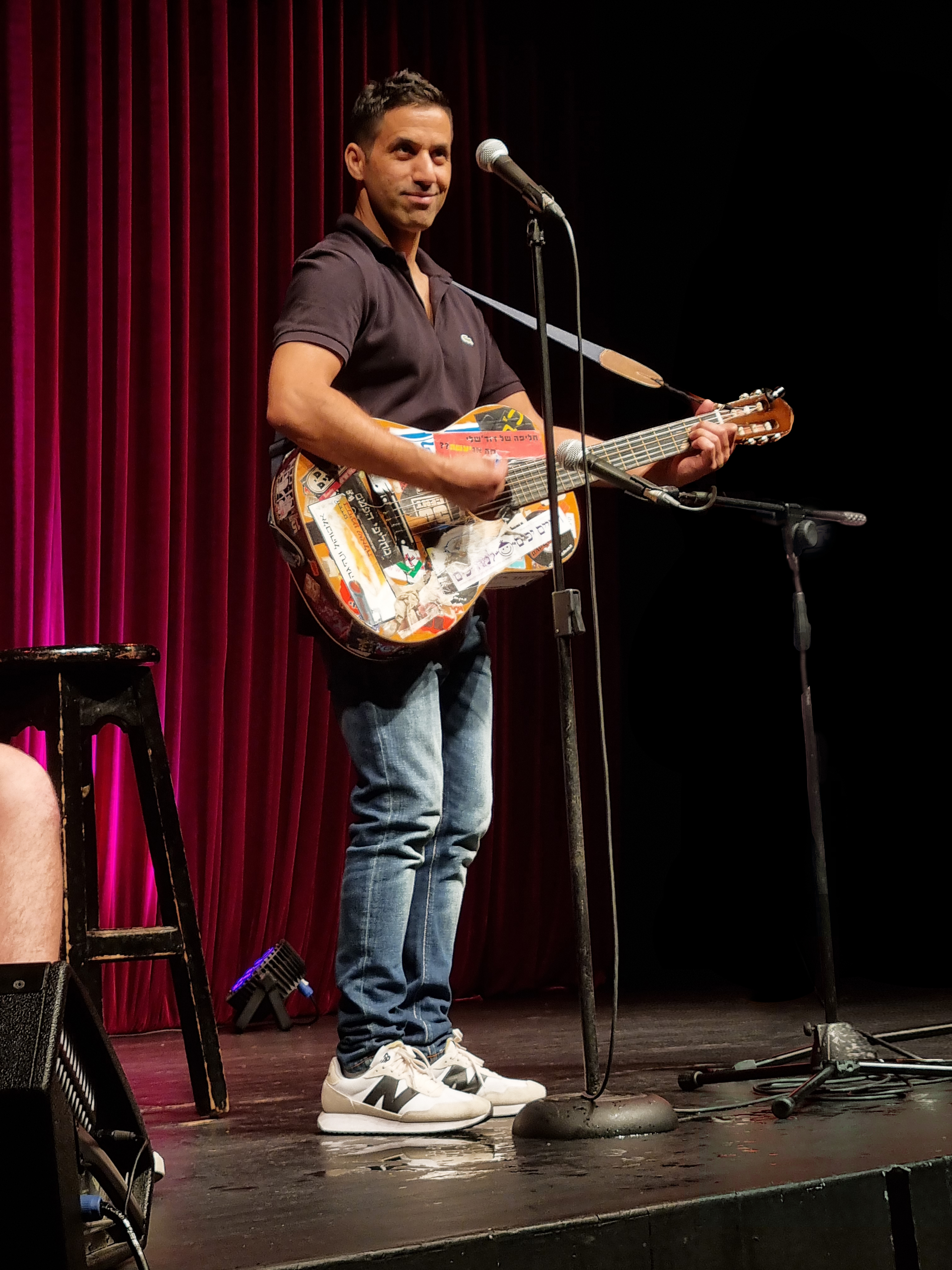
Shahar Hason

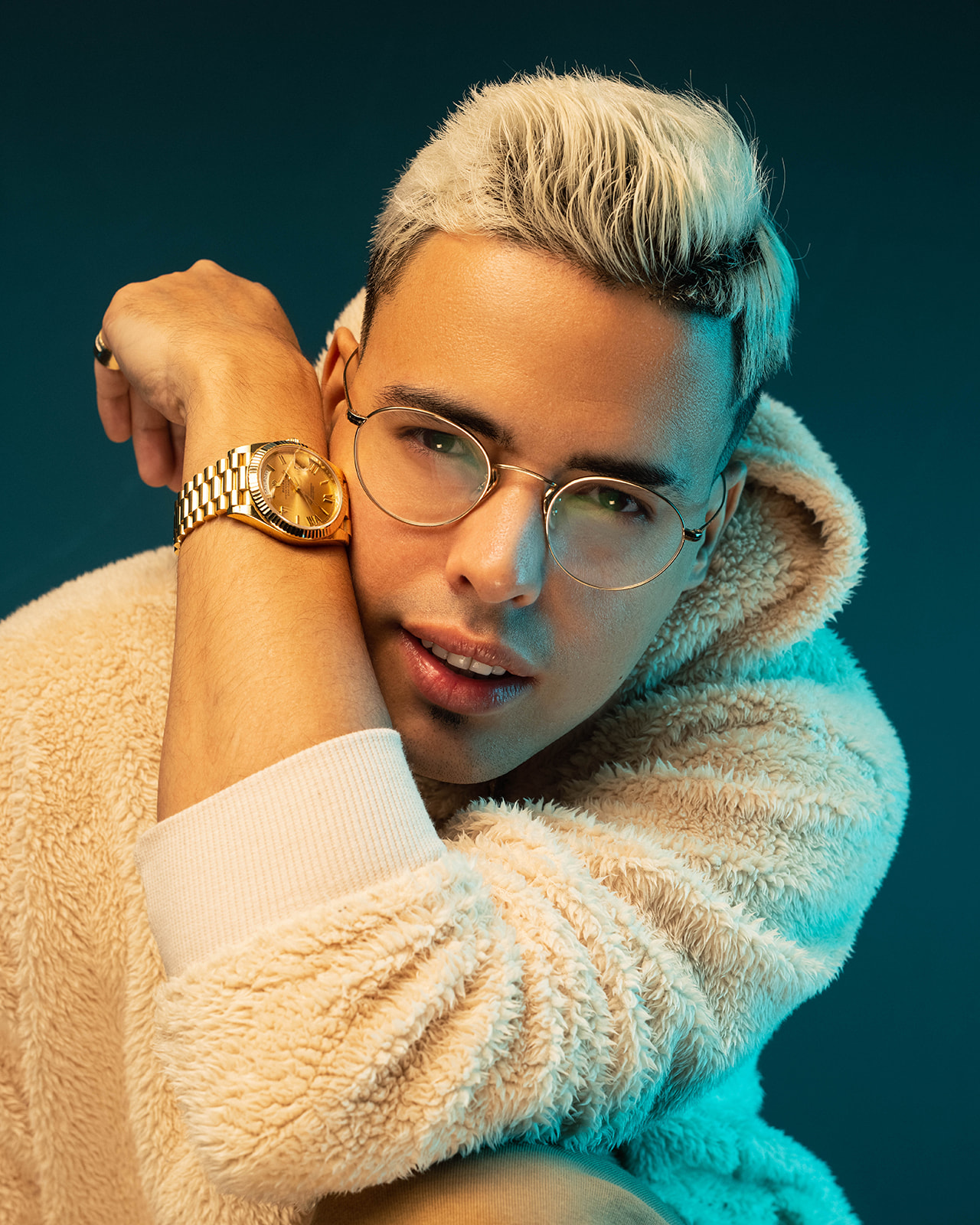
Static

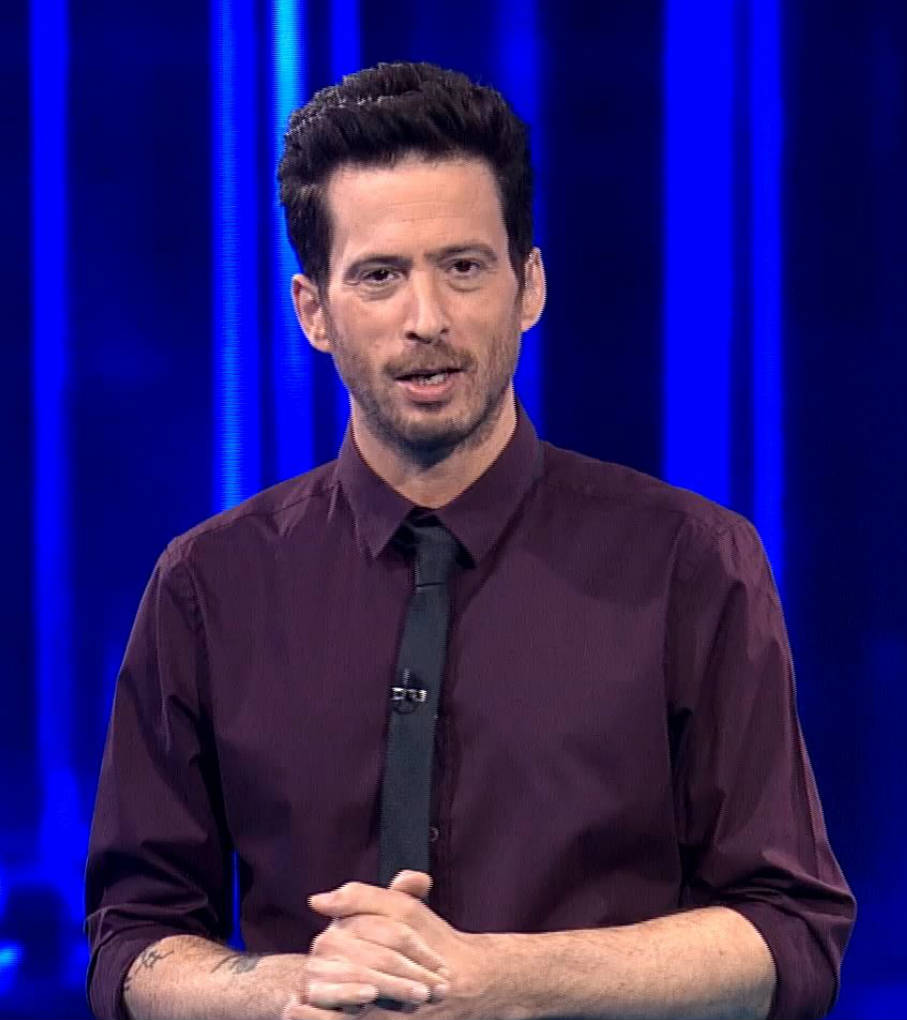
Ido Rosenblum

The show is hosted by television presenter Ido Rosenblum, with the judging panel consisting of journalist Ofira Asayag, the comedian Shahar Hason, singer Static (except of episode 8), and director Tzedi Tzarfati.

=== Guest panelists ===
Throughout the fourth season, various guest judges appeared alongside the original, for one episode.

These guest panelists include:

Episode	Name	Notability
4	Pnina Rosenblum	Businesswoman, model, media personality and a former politician
5	Agam Rudberg	Model and Actress
6	Orel Tzabari	Comedian
7	Anna Zak	Singer, model and actress
8	Eliana Tidhar	Singer and actress
8	Lee Biran	Singer and actor
9	Yael Shelbia	Model and actress
10	Ran Danker	Actor, singer and model
11	Pablo Rosenberg	Singer and musician
12	Gideon Oko	Journalist
15	Lucy Ayoub	Television presenter, poet and radio
16	Lital Schwartz	Comedian and actress
17	Jonathan Mergui	Singer, actor and dancer
18	Avi Nusbaom	Comedian and TV host
19	Assi Azar	TV host
19	Rotem Sela	Model, television presenter and actress

=== Guest stars ===
- Orly Silbersatz Banai - Psychologist (episode 9)
- Liron Zaid - Journalist (episode 12)
- Dudu Erez - Zoltar (episode 16)

== Contestants ==
Stage Name	Celebrity	Occupation	Episodes																			
Stage Name	Celebrity	Occupation	1	2	3	4	5	6	7	8	9	10	11	12	13/14	15	16	17	18	19	20	
Stage Name	Celebrity	Occupation	A	B	C	B		A		C		B	A	C	13/14	15	16	17	18	19	A	B
Sufganiyah	Dana Ivgy	Actress		SAFE		SAFE	SAFE					SAFE			SAFE		SAFE	SAFE		SAFE	SAFE	WINNER
Poodle	Mali Levi	Actress		SAFE		SAFE	SAFE					SAFE			SAFE	SAFE			RISK	SAFE	SAFE	RUNNER-UP
Butterfly	Maya Dagan	Actress			SAFE					SAFE	SAFE			SAFE	SAFE		SAFE	RISK		SAFE	THIRD	
Panther	Taylor Malkov	Singer			SAFE					SAFE	SAFE			SAFE	SAFE	SAFE			SAFE	OUT		
Sloth	Zvika Hadar (Note: For the first time, same celebrity was in two masks in same season, when Zvika Hadar was "Two-Faced" and "Sloth".)	Actor			SAFE					SAFE	SAFE			SAFE	SAFE	SAFE			OUT			
Bubblegum	Miki Kam	Actress	SAFE					SAFE	SAFE				SAFE		SAFE		SAFE	OUT				
Alpaca	Oshri Cohen	Actor	SAFE					SAFE	SAFE				SAFE		SAFE		OUT					
Scarecrow	Lihi Griner	Reality Television Personality		SAFE		SAFE	SAFE					SAFE			SAFE	OUT						
Panda	Evelin Hagoel	Actress	SAFE					SAFE	SAFE				SAFE		OUT							
Monster	Tuvia Tzafir	Actor			SAFE					SAFE	N/A			Disqualified (Note: After missing the last episode for personal reasons, Monster was disqualified from the show.)								
Two-Faced	Zvika Hadar	Actor	SAFE					SAFE	SAFE				OUT									
Hurricane	Avi Greinik	Comedian		SAFE		SAFE	SAFE					OUT										
Pufferfish	Yishai Levi	Singer			SAFE					SAFE	OUT											
Bat	Nadav Bornstein	Journalist	SAFE					SAFE	OUT													
Watermelon	Menachem Horowitz	Journalist		SAFE		SAFE	OUT															
Broccoli	Orna Barbivai	Politician		SAFE		OUT																
Doll	Gila Almagor	Actress			OUT																	
Mr. TV	Meir Sheetrit	Politician		OUT																		
Saturn	Yaron Berald	Actor	OUT																			

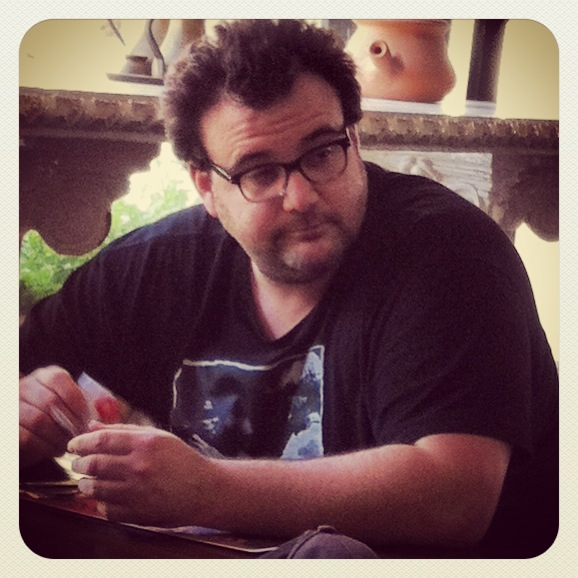
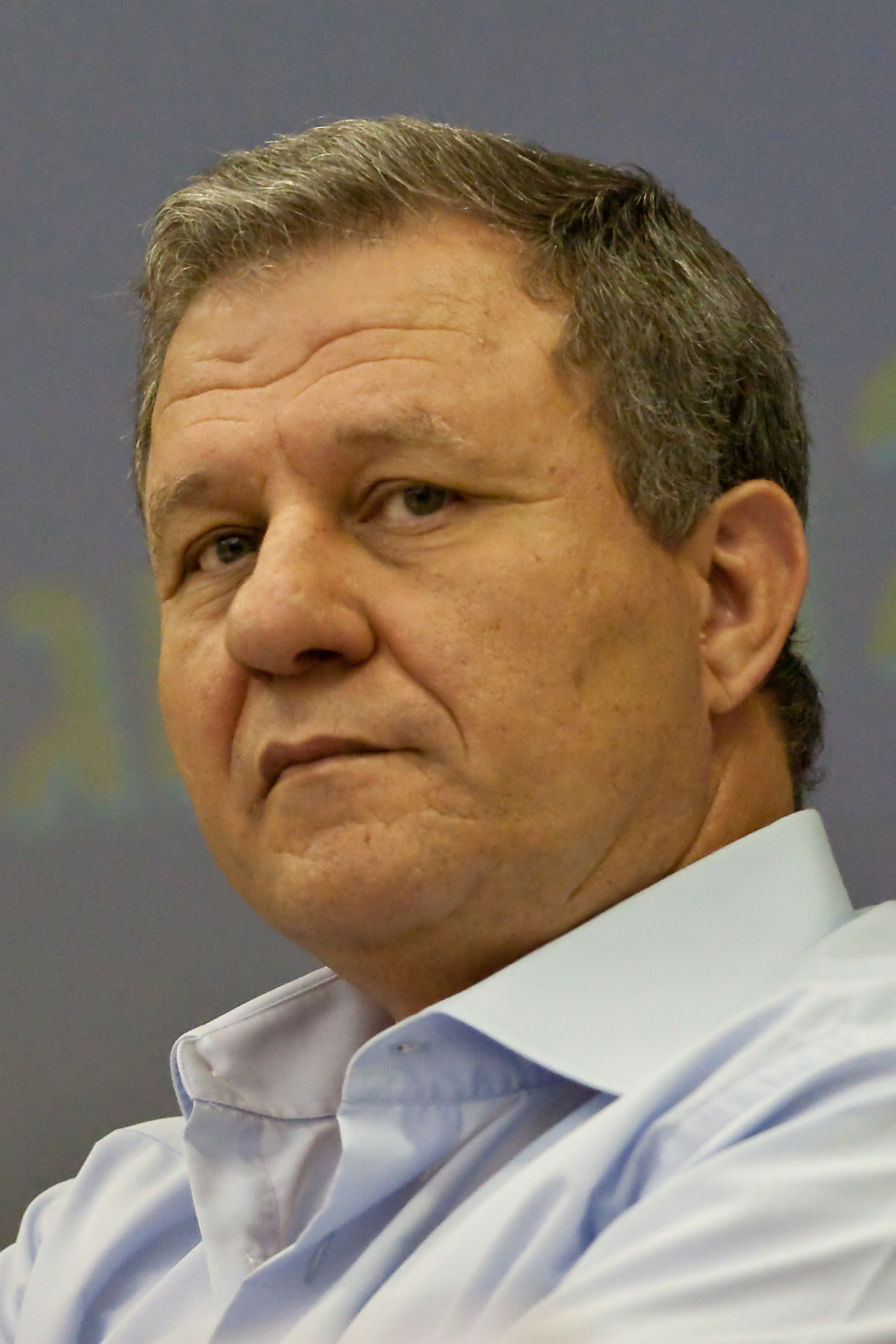
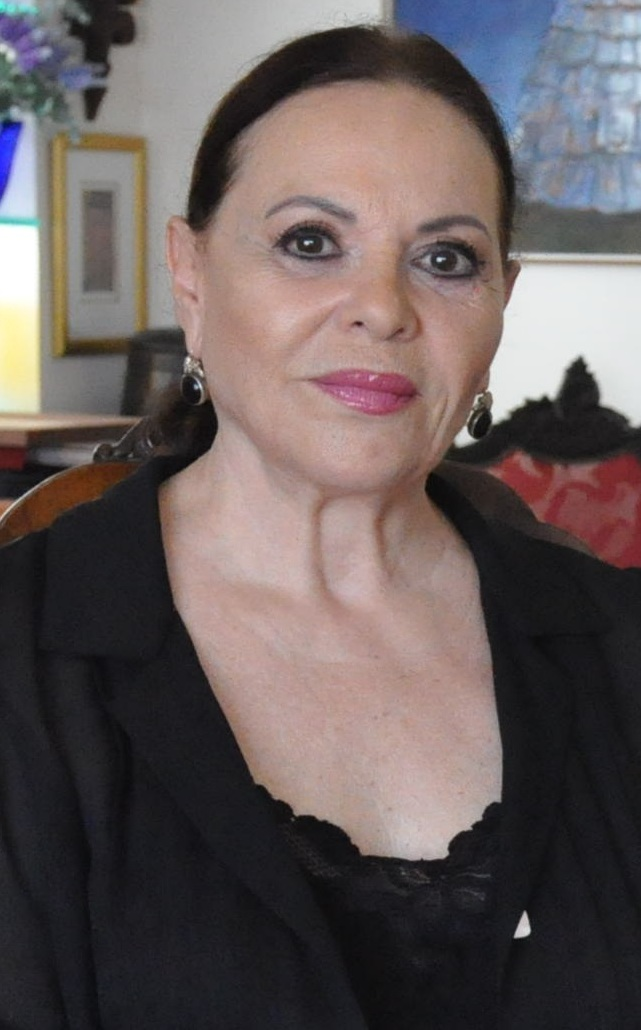
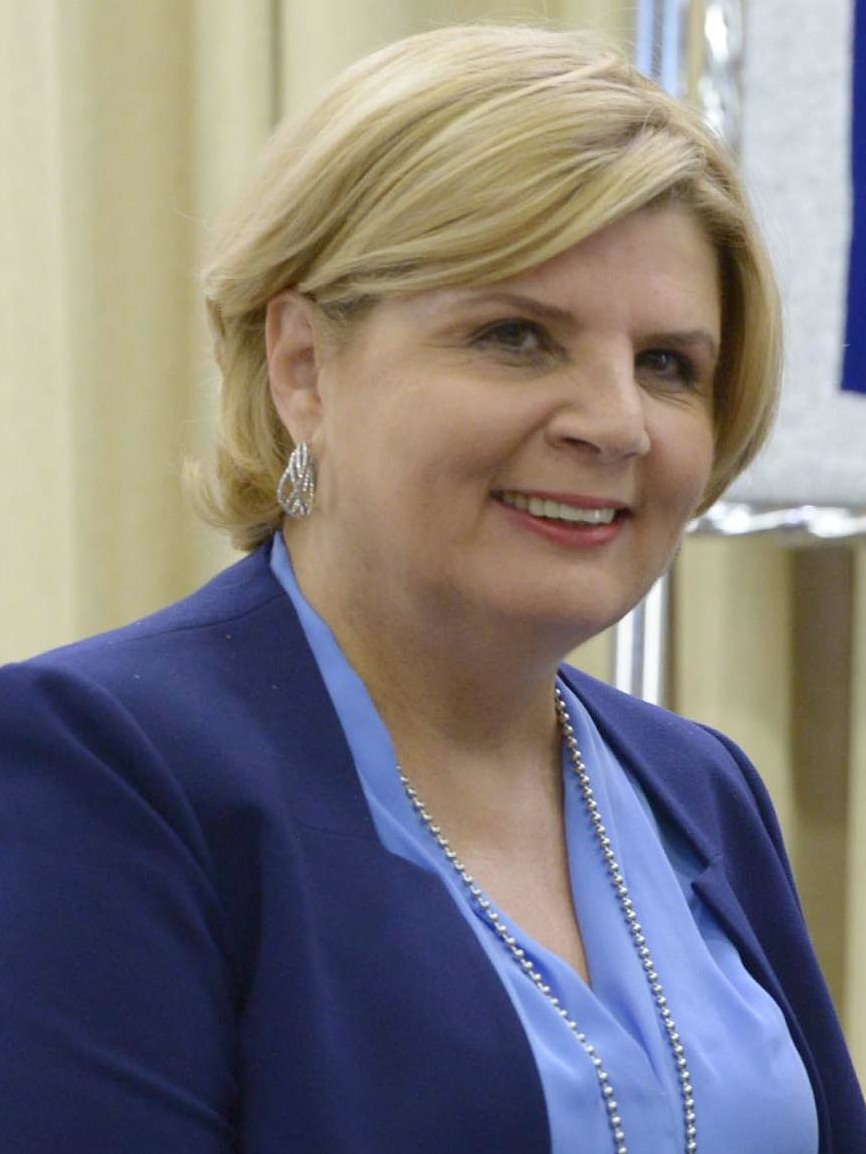
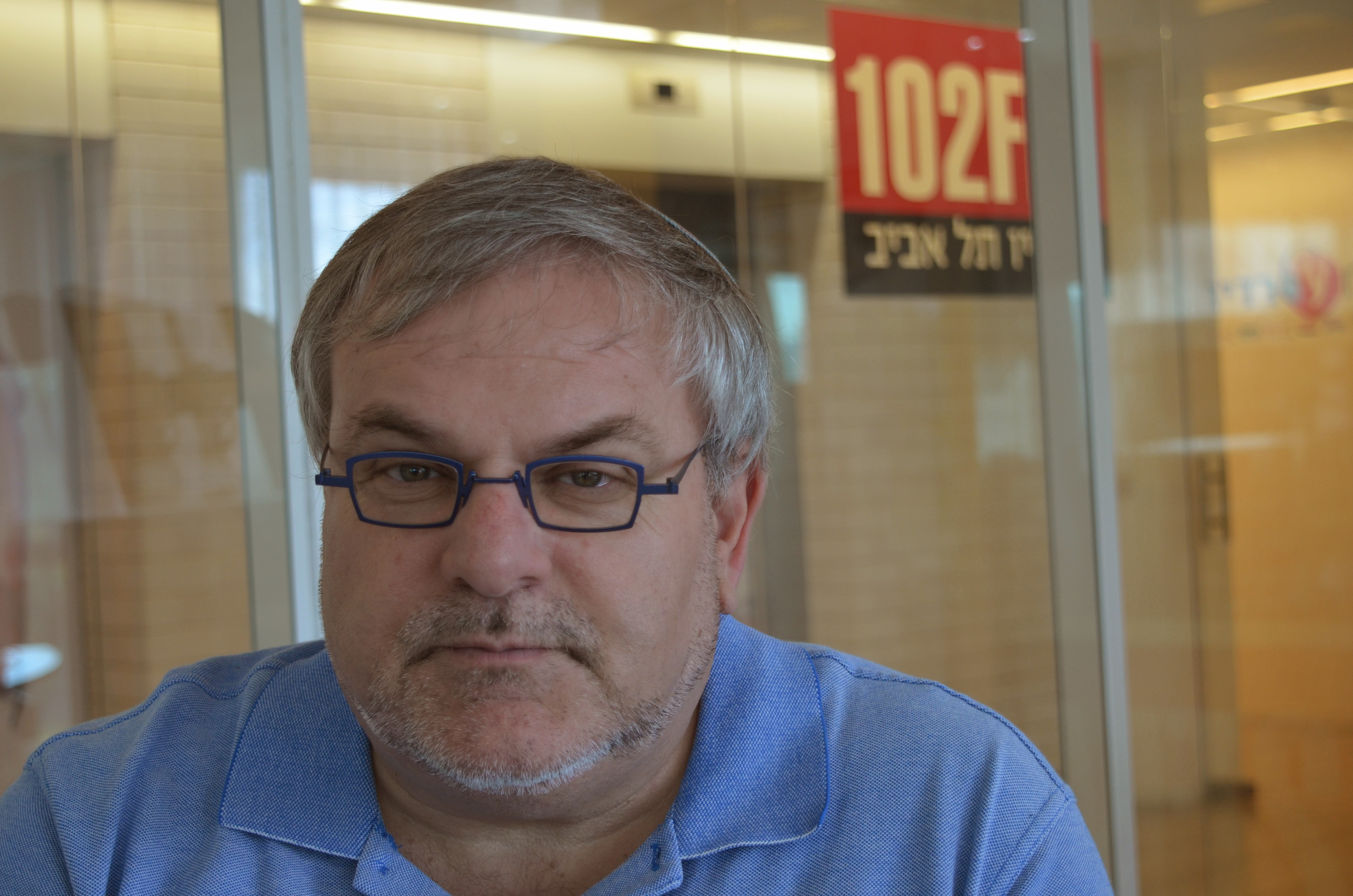
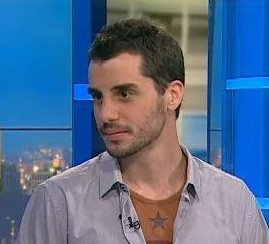
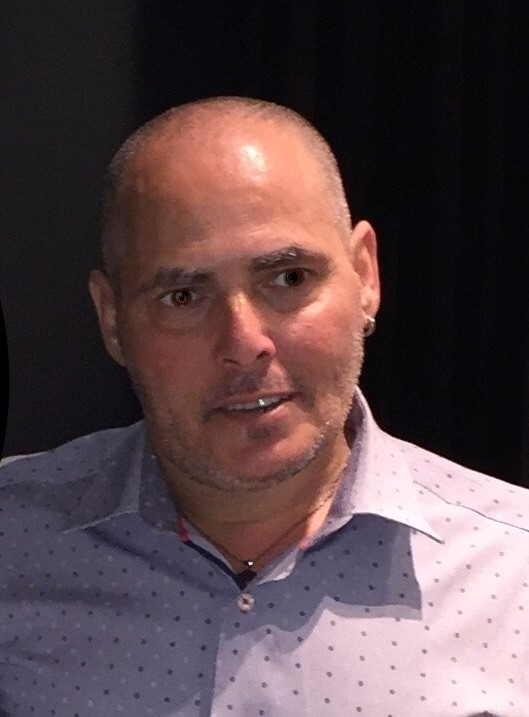
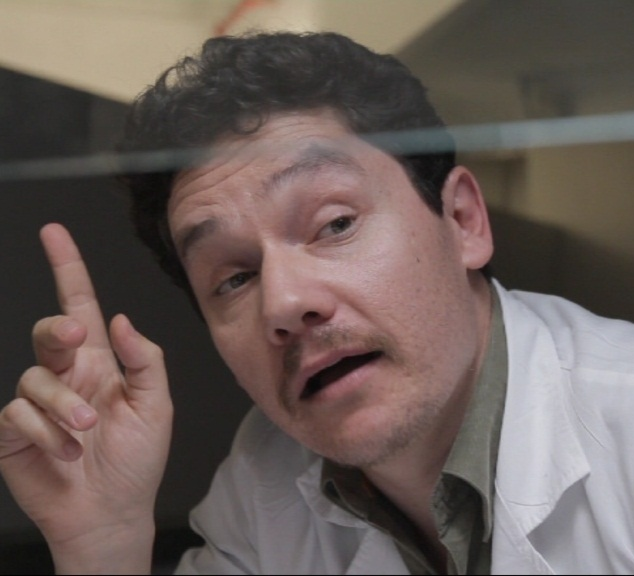
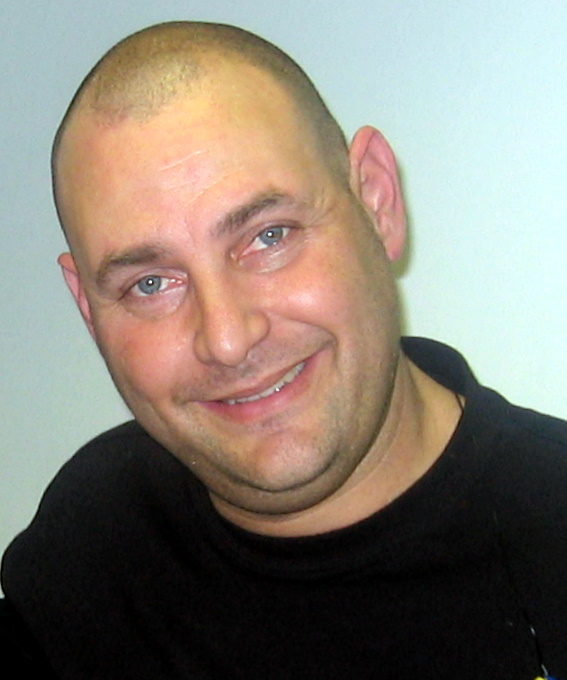
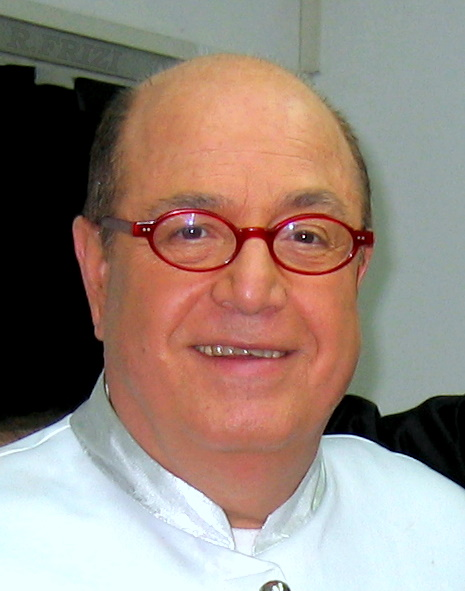
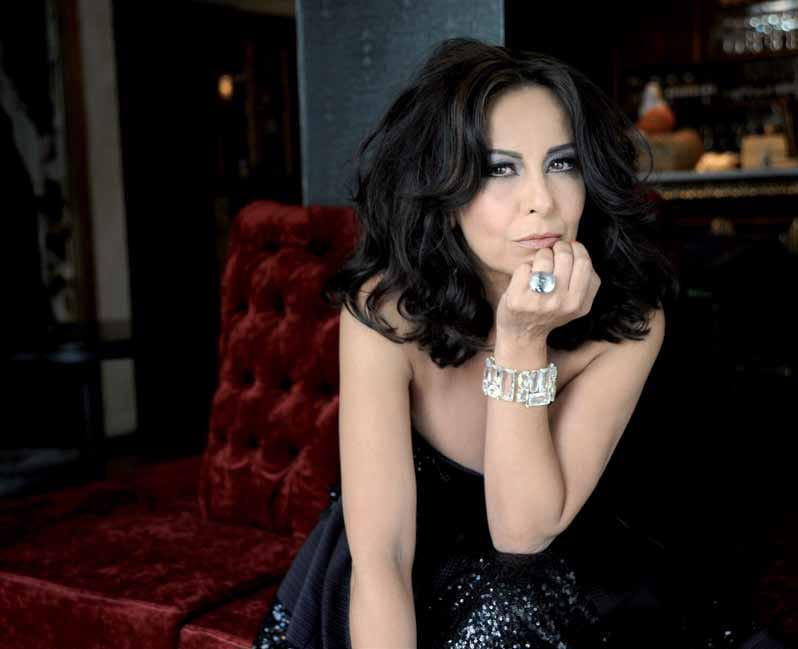
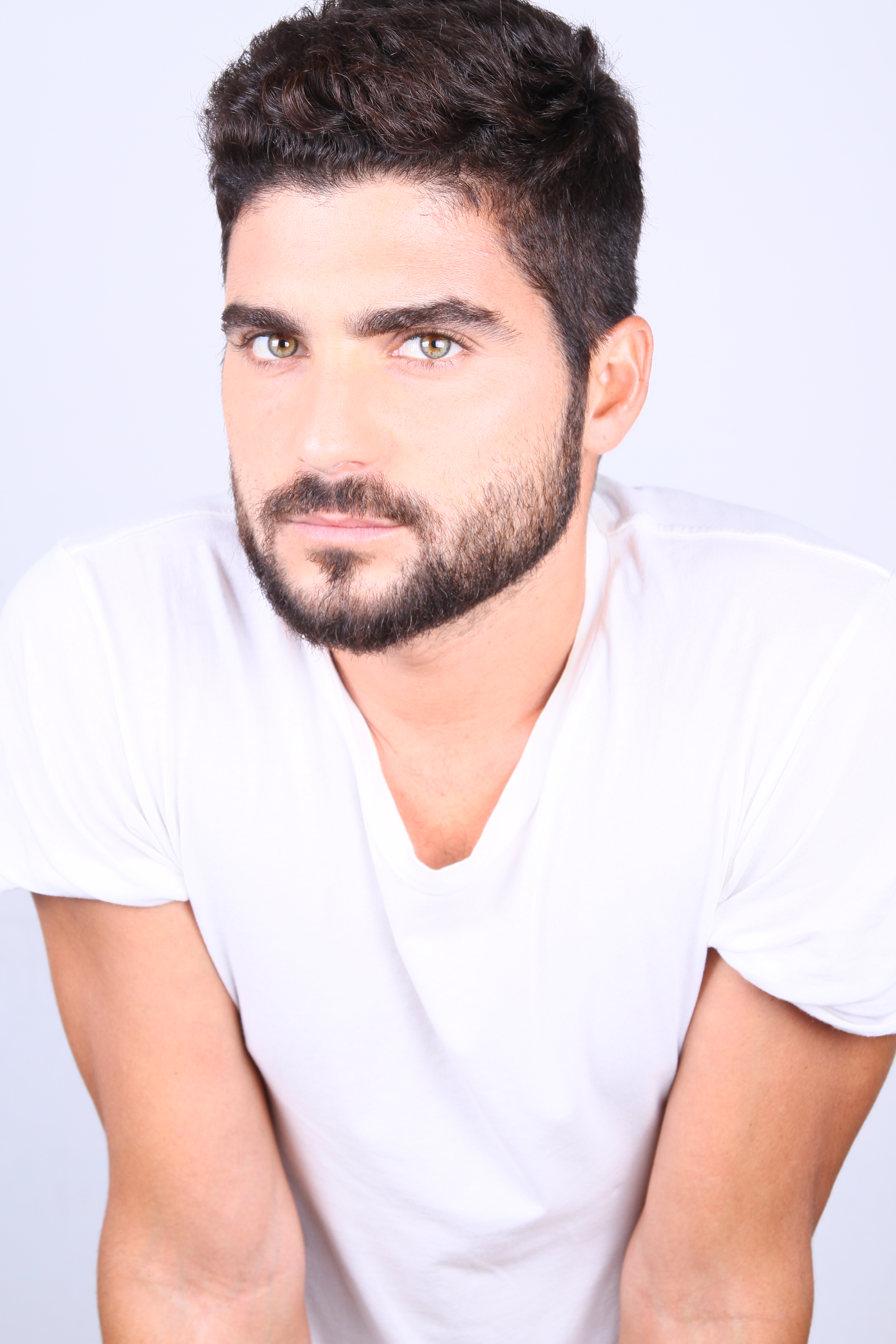
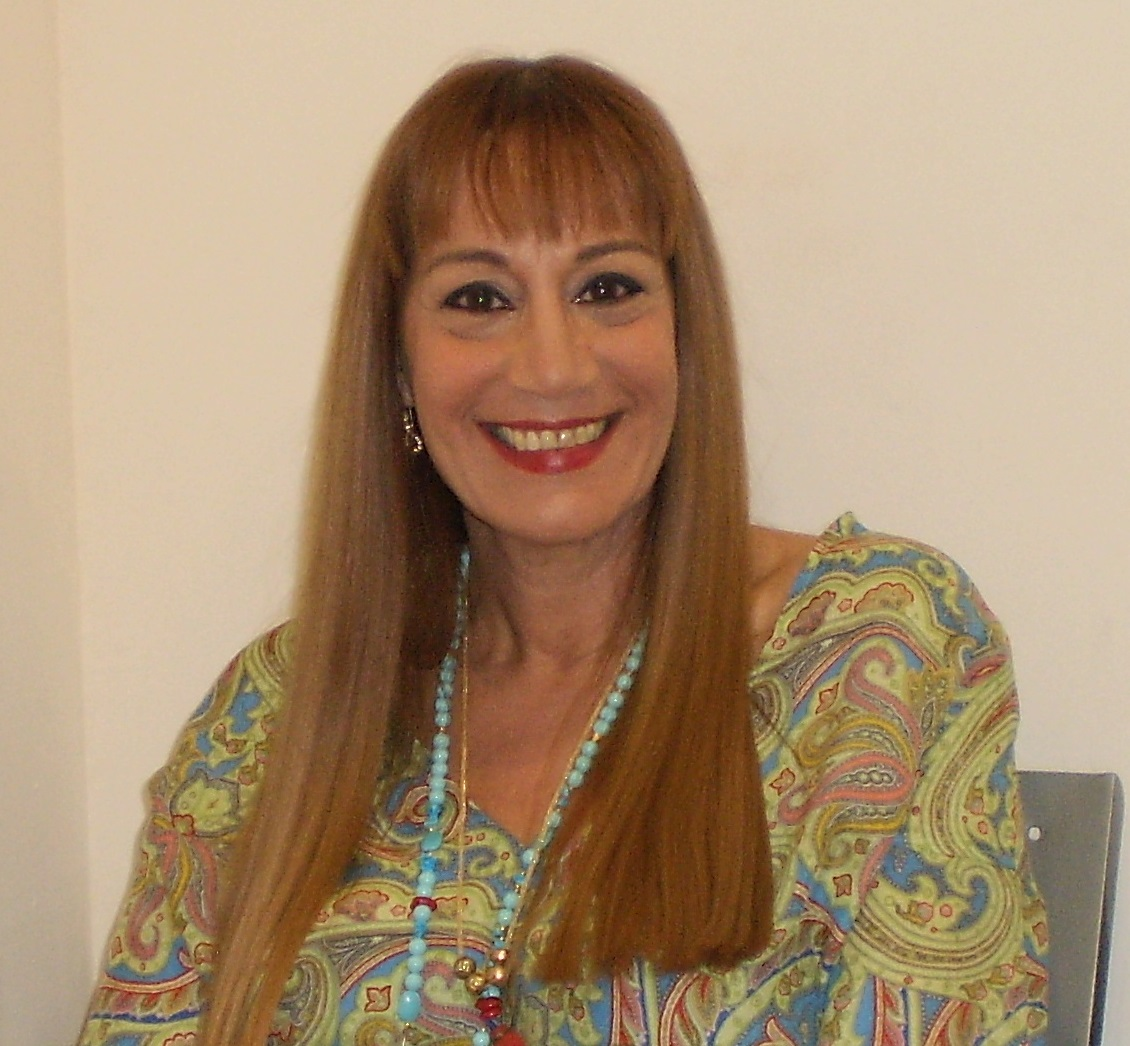
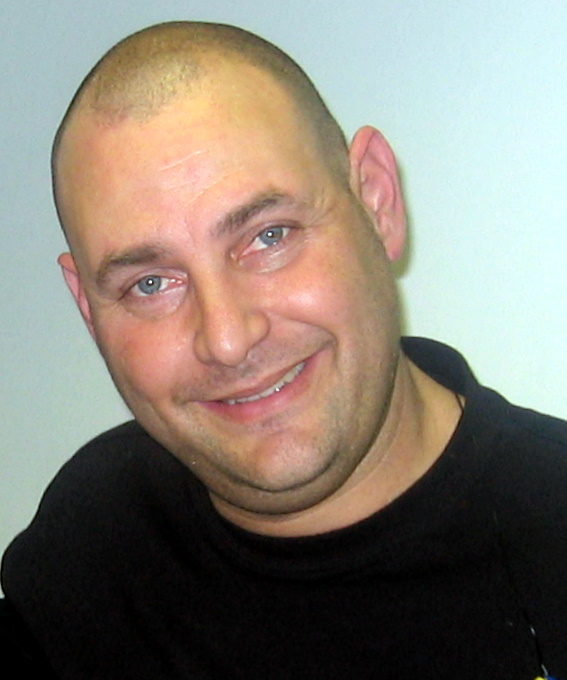
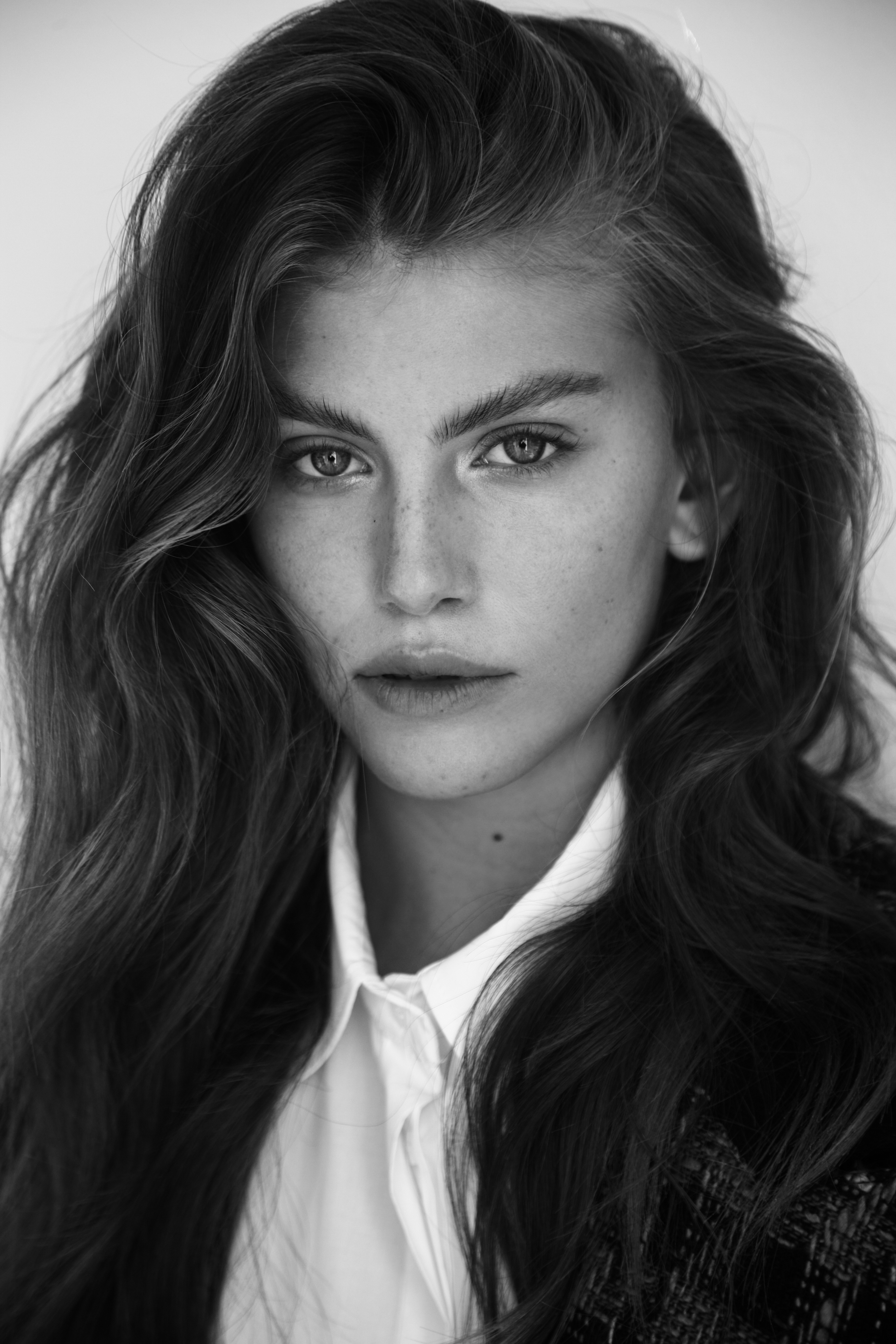
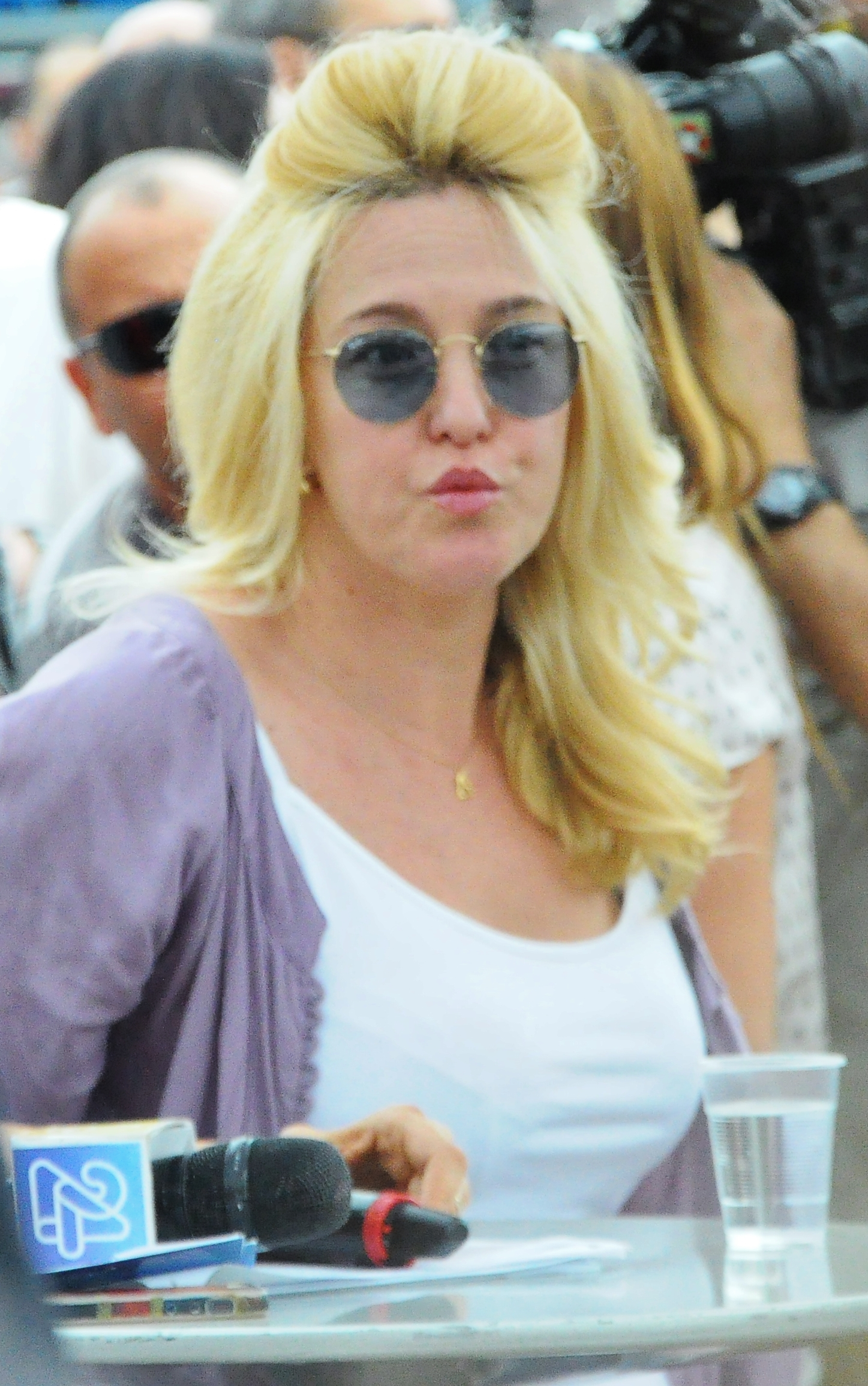
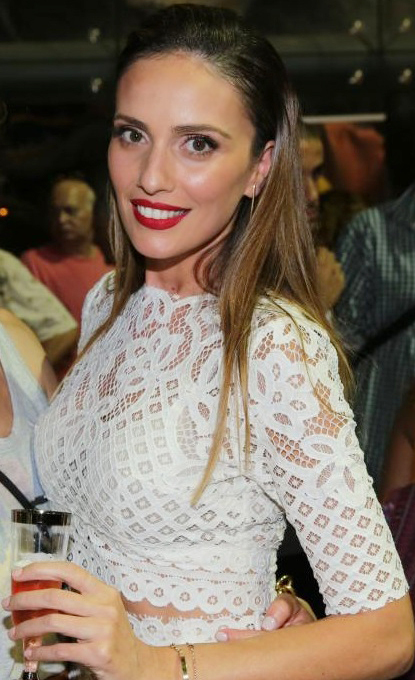
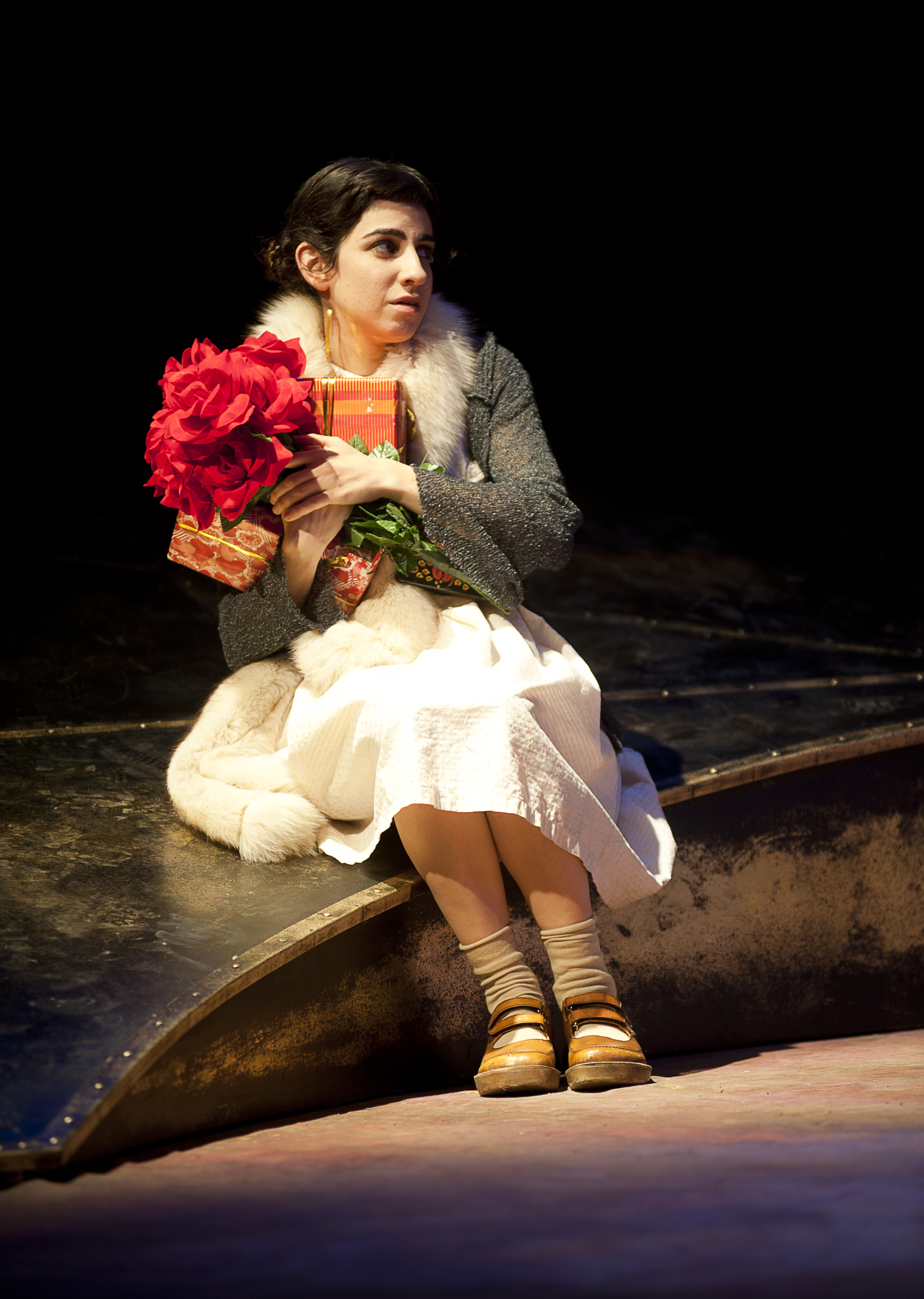
The celebrities who competed in the fourth season of The Singer in the Mask, pictured in order of elimination (l-r):

Yaron Berald ("Saturn"), Meir Sheetrit ("Mr. Tv"), Gila Almagor ("Doll"), Orna Barbivai ("Broccoli"), Menachem Horowitz ("Watermelon"), Nadav Bornstein ("Bat"), Yishai Levi ("Pufferfish"), Avi Greinik ("Hurricane"), Zvika Hadar ("Two-Faced"), Tuvia Tzafir ("Monster"), Evelin Hagoel ("Panda"), Oshri Cohen ("Alpaca"), Miki Kam ("Bubblegum"), Zvika Hadar ("Sloth"), Taylor Malkov ("Panther"), Maya Dagan ("Butterfly"), Mali Levy ("Poodle"), Dana Ivgy ("Sufganiyah")

Not pictured: Lihi Griner ("Scarecrow")

== Episodes ==
=== Week 1 (May 21) ===
Performances on the first episode
#	Stage name	Song	Identity	Result
1	Bubblegum	"Tattoo" by Loreen	undisclosed	SAFE
2	Alpaca	"Hello" by Lionel Richie	undisclosed	SAFE
3	Panda	"Proud Mary" by Creedence Clearwater Revival	undisclosed	SAFE
4	Bat	"Love Yourself" by Justin Bieber	undisclosed	SAFE
5	Saturn	"מלאך" by Aviv Geffen	Yaron Berald	OUT
6	Two-Faced	"רונדלים" by Static / "פחד אלוהים" by Kfir Tsafrir	undisclosed	SAFE

=== Week 2 (May 25) ===
Performances on the second episode
#	Stage name	Song	Identity	Result
1	Sufganiyah	"Big Girls Cry" by Sia	undisclosed	SAFE
2	Watermelon	"Delilah" by Tom Jones	undisclosed	SAFE
3	Scarecrow	"Born This Way" by Lady Gaga	undisclosed	SAFE
4	Hurricane	"Hurricane" by Marina Maximilian	undisclosed	SAFE
5	Broccoli	"אולסטאר וגופיות" by Anna Zak	undisclosed	SAFE
6	Mr. TV	"The Winner Takes It All" by ABBA	Meir Sheetrit	OUT
7	Poodle	"Roar" by Katy Perry	undisclosed	SAFE

=== Week 3 (May 27) ===
Performances on the third episode
#	Stage name	Song	Identity	Result
1	Butterfly	"Always Remember Us This Way" by Lady Gaga	undisclosed	SAFE
2	Sloth	"The Lazy Song" by Bruno Mars	undisclosed	SAFE
3	Monster	"Feeling Good" by Michael Bublé	undisclosed	SAFE
4	Pufferfish	"מישהו שומע אותי" by Eifo HaYeled	undisclosed	SAFE
5	Doll	"Will You Love Me Tomorrow" by The Shirelles	Gila Almagor	OUT
6	Panther	"Blank Space" by Taylor Swift	undisclosed	SAFE

=== Week 4 - Disney Night (June 2) ===
Performances on the fourth episode
#	Stage name	Song	Identity	Result
1	Poodle	"Let It Go" from Frozen	undisclosed	SAFE
2	Hurricane	"Beauty and the Beast" from Beauty and the Beast	undisclosed	SAFE
3	Watermelon	"Hakuna Matata" from The Lion King	undisclosed	SAFE
4	Scarecrow	"Colors of the Wind" from Pocahontas	undisclosed	SAFE
5	Broccoli	"I'd Do Anything for Love (But I Won't Do That)" from Beauty and the Beast	Orna Barbivai	OUT
6	Sufganiyah	"Part of Your World" from The Little Mermaid	undisclosed	SAFE

=== Week 5 (June 4) ===
Performances on the fifth episode
#	Stage name	Song	Identity	Result
1	Sufganiyah	"No" by Meghan Trainor	undisclosed	SAFE
2	Hurricane	"Grenade" by Bruno Mars	undisclosed	SAFE
3	Scarecrow	"נאדי באדי" by Shahar Tavoch & Agam Buhbut	undisclosed	SAFE
4	Watermelon	"Can't Help Falling in Love" by Elvis Presley	Menachem Horowitz	OUT
5	Poodle	"Dernière danse" by Indila	undisclosed	SAFE

=== Week 6 (June 5) ===
Performances on the sixth episode
#	Stage name	Song	Identity	Result
1	Panda	"I'm Outta Love" by Anastacia	undisclosed	SAFE
2	Two-Faced	"Beat It" by Michael Jackson	undisclosed	SAFE
3	Bat	"Total Eclipse of the Heart" by Bonnie Tyler	undisclosed	SAFE
4	Bubblegum	"יחפים" by Jasmin Moallem	undisclosed	SAFE
5	Alpaca	"אמיר דדון" by Amir Dadon	undisclosed	SAFE

=== Week 7 (June 8) ===
Performances on the seventh episode
#	Stage name	Song	Identity	Result
1	Panda	"Nana Banana" by Netta Barzilai	undisclosed	SAFE
2	Alpaca	"Never Enough" by Loren Allred	undisclosed	SAFE
3	Two-Faced	"One Way Ticket" by Eruption	undisclosed	SAFE
4	Bat	"The Champion" by Carrie Underwood	Nadav Bornstein	OUT
5	Bubblegum	"Murder on the Dancefloor" by Sophie Ellis-Bextor	undisclosed	SAFE

=== Week 8 (June 11) ===
Performances on the eighth episode
#	Stage name	Song	Identity	Result
1	Monster	"אור הירח" by Aviv Geffen	undisclosed	SAFE
2	Panther	"עולה על שולחנות" by Marina Maximilian	undisclosed	SAFE
3	Sloth	"We Are Young" by Fun	undisclosed	SAFE
4	Pufferfish	"עומד על צוק" by Hi-Five	undisclosed	SAFE
5	Butterfly	"Careless Whisper" by George Michael	undisclosed	SAFE

=== Week 9 (June 18) ===
Performances on the ninth episode
#	Stage name	Song	Identity	Result
1	Sloth	"Tous les mêmes" by Stromae	undisclosed	SAFE
2	Butterfly	"Someone like You" by Adele	undisclosed	SAFE
3	Pufferfish	"לבחור נכון" by Amir Dadom	Yishai Levi	OUT
4	Panther	"Flowers" by Miley Cyrus	undisclosed	SAFE
-	Monster	Not Performed	undisclosed	N/A

=== Week 10 (June 24) ===
Performances on the tenth episode
#	Stage name	Song	Identity	Result
1	Scarecrow	"קח אותי" by Tom Patrober	undisclosed	SAFE
2	Poodle	"Lost on You" by LP	undisclosed	SAFE
3	Sufganiyah	"Out Here on My Own" by Irene Cara	undisclosed	SAFE
4	Hurricane	"השמלה החדשה שלי" by Ran Danker	Avi Greinik	OUT

=== Week 11 (June 28) ===
Performances on the eleventh episode
#	Stage name	Song	Identity	Result
1	Panda	"לוליטה" by Etti Ankri	undisclosed	SAFE
2	Two-Faced	"אחלה גבר" by Static & Ben El Tavori and Dana International / "שלושה בנות" by Noa Kirel	Zvika Hadar	OUT
3	Bubblegum	"S&M" by Rihanna	undisclosed	SAFE
4	Alpaca	"Marry You" by Bruno Mars	undisclosed	SAFE

=== Week 12 (July 1) ===
Performances on the twelfth episode
#	Stage name	Song	Identity	Result
1	Sloth	"אהבה" by Osher Cohen	undisclosed	SAFE
2	Panther	"Money, Money, Money" by ABBA	undisclosed	SAFE
3	Butterfly	"I'm Still Standing" by Elton John	undisclosed	SAFE
4	Monster	"When a Man Loves a Woman" by Percy Sledge	Tuvia Tzafir	Disqualified

=== Week 13 - Eurovision Night (July 5/8) ===
Performances on the thirteenth and fourteenth episode
Ep.	#	Stage name	Country	Song	Identity	Result
13	1	Panda	Greece	"Sokrati" by Elpida	Evelin Hagoel	OUT
13	2	Panther	Cyprus	"Fuego" by Eleni Foureira	undisclosed	SAFE
13	3	Alpaca	Netherlands	"Arcade" by Duncan Laurence	undisclosed	SAFE
13	4	Sloth	Italy	"Nel blu, dipinto di blu" by Domenico Modugno	undisclosed	SAFE
13	5	Sufganiyah	Luxembourg	"Tu te reconnaîtras" by Anne-Marie David	undisclosed	SAFE
14	6	Bubblegum	Austria	"Rise Like a Phoenix" by Conchita Wurst	undisclosed	SAFE
14	7	Scarecrow	Denmark	"Only Teardrops" by Emmelie de Forest	undisclosed	SAFE
14	8	Poodle	Sweden	"Euphoria" by Loreen	undisclosed	SAFE
14	9	Butterfly	Switzerland	"Ne partez pas sans moi" by Celine Dion	undisclosed	SAFE

=== Week 14 (July 12/15) ===
Performances on the fifteenth episode
#	Stage name	Song	Identity	Result
1	Sloth	"מישבאלי" by Shahar Tavoch	undisclosed	SAFE
2	Panther	"On the Floor" by Jennifer Lopez and Pitbull	undisclosed	SAFE
3	Scarecrow	"My Immortal" by Evanescence	Lihi Griner	OUT
4	Poodle	"Vampire" by Olivia Rodrigo	undisclosed	SAFE

Performances on the sixteenth episode
#	Stage name	Song	Identity	Result
1	Alpaca	"Without You" by David Guetta	Oshri Cohen	OUT
2	Sufganiyah	"מסיבה בחיפה" by Itay Levy	undisclosed	SAFE
3	Bubblegum	"אינטלקטוערסית" by Odeya	undisclosed	SAFE
4	Butterfly	"Unicorn" by Noa Kirel	undisclosed	SAFE

=== Week 15 - Quarterfinals & Semifinal (19/20/26 July) ===
Performances on the seventeenth episode
#	Stage name	Song	Identity	Result
Round One
1	Bubblegum	"Break Free" by Ariana Grande	undisclosed	RISK
2	Butterfly	"Beautiful" by Christina Aguilera	undisclosed	RISK
3	Sufganiyah	"Hello" by Adele	undisclosed	SAFE
Round Two
1	Butterfly	"Fame" by Irene Cara	undisclosed	WIN
2	Bubblegum	"Fame" by Irene Cara	Miki Kam	OUT

Performances on the eighteenth episode
#	Stage name	Song	Identity	Result
Round One
1	Sloth	"אמן על הילדים" by Hanan Ben Ari	undisclosed	RISK
2	Panther	"Lose Control" by Teddy Swims	undisclosed	SAFE
3	Poodle	"Beautiful Things" by Benson Boone	undisclosed	RISK
Round Two
1	Sloth	"Valerie" by Amy Winehouse	Zvika Hadar	OUT
2	Poodle	"Valerie" by Amy Winehouse	undisclosed	WIN

Performances on the nineteenth episode
#	Stage name	Song	Identity	Result
1	Ofira & Panther	"Diva" by Dana International	GUEST	
2	Poodle	"Hopelessly Devoted to You" by Olivia Newton-John	undisclosed	SAFE
3	Butterfly	"We Are the Champions" by Queen	undisclosed	SAFE
4	Panther	"Applause" by Lady Gaga	Taylor Malkov	OUT
5	Sufganiyah	"My Heart Will Go On" by Celine Dion	undisclosed	SAFE

=== Week 16 - Final (29 July) ===
Performances on the final episode
#	Stage name	Song	Identity	Result
Round One
1	Butterfly	"I Have Nothing" by Whitney Houston	Maya Dagan	THIRD
2	Poodle	"Don't You Worry 'bout a Thing" by Stevie Wonder	undisclosed	SAFE
3	Sufganiyah	"It Must Have Been Love" by Roxette	undisclosed	SAFE
Round Two
1	Poodle	"Your Song" by Elton John	Mali Levi	RUNNER-UP
2	Sufganiyah	"Without You" by Mariah Carey	Dana Ivgy	WINNER
