= Nick Kolyohin =

Israeli-Russian journalist

- ניק קוליוחין
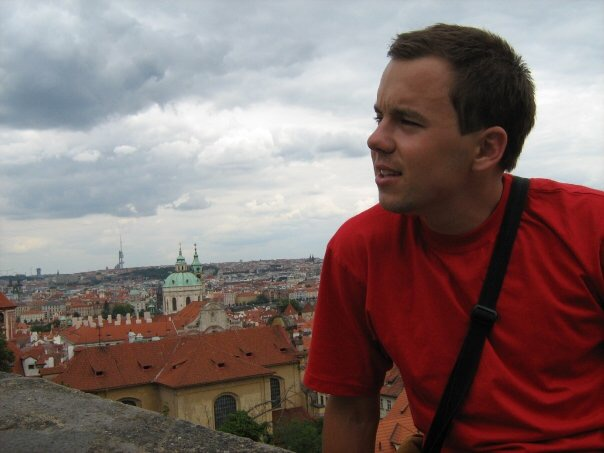
- Kolyohin in 2008
- Born: 7 November 1983 (age 42); Moscow, Russia
- Citizenship: Israeli
- Occupation: Journalism

Nick Kolyohin (Hebrew: ניק קוליוחין; Russian: Ник Колёхин or Russian: Никита Валерьевич Кулюхин; born 7 November 1983) is an Israeli-Russian international journalist, correspondent, television reporter, videographer and photojournalist.

As of 2018, Kolyohin is a correspondent at Xinhua News Agency, based in Israel, and was previously a TV correspondent and deputy Editor-In-Chief of the flagship, evening television news bulletin broadcast at 8 pm in leading Israeli Channel 13 (Israel).

== Early life and education ==
Kolyohin was born in 1983 in Moscow, Russia. In 1992, Nick and his family immigrated to Israel. He speaks fluently English, Russian, and Hebrew. He has appeared in small roles in films, TV series, and commercials since he was a teenager. Kolyohin served three years in special forces of the Israeli army, where he was trained as a combat soldier and spent his military service as a fighter and counter-terrorism, Krav Maga, and shooting instructor. After his discharge from mandatory service at Israel Defense Forces in 2006 he continued to serve until 2020 in the reserve forces of the Israeli army.

== Career ==
Kolyohin studied TV, filming, and journalism at Tel Aviv University, after completing his first year he started to work as news editor at Channel 2 (Israeli TV channel), later he worked as a correspondent at various major news outlets in Israel such as One (website) and Hot (Israel), in addition, Kolyohin was a spokesperson at Prime Minister's Office (Israel) in 2011-2012 during the tenure of Benjamin Netanyahu. In 2012 he started his work at Channel 13 News.

Since 2018 the stories that Kolyohin makes for Xinhua News Agency and CNC World are published in big news outlets around the world. Kolyohin writes features and does on-camera reports mainly about the environment, science, and technology.

== See also ==
- Media of Israel
