= Maya Dagan =

Israeli actress (born 1975)

Maya Dagan, 2014

Maya Dagan (Hebrew: מיה דגן; born 1975) is an Israeli film and stage actress, comedian, and singer, Israel Theater Prize and Ophir Award winner.

After the graduation from the Beit Zvi acting school, for 17 years she worked with the Beit Lessin Theater, which she departed (with a controversy) for Cameri Theatre in 2016, to star in מצחיקונת, Funny Girl, for the lead role she said she coveted as "a role of the lifetime" (and for which she earned the Israel Theater Prize). In 2022 she returned to Beit Lessin.

== Filmography ==
- 2020: Manayek, TV series
- 2018: The Other Story
- 2013: A Strange Course of Events
- 2010: The Matchmaker
- 2004-2007: HaShir Shelanu, TV drama series

== TV shows ==
- 2025: The Singer in the Mask season 4 contest (finishing 3rd)
- She acted as a judge or assistant judge in The X Factor Israel season 2, Israeli version of Got Talent, and Rokdim Im Kokhavim, Israeli version of Dancing with the Stars

== Awards ==
- 2001: Israel Theater Prize as the most promising actres for her role in A Letter to Noah
- 2010: Ophir Award in "Best Actress" category for her role in the film The Matchmaker
- 2017: Israel Theater Prize in the "Actress in a Leading Role in a Musical" category in the play מצחיקונת, Funny Girl, an Israeli staging of the Broadway musical Funny Girl
