= Ramzor =

Israeli sitcom, 2008–2014

- Ramzor logo
- Hebrew: רַמְזוֹר
- Genre: Sitcom
- Created by: Adir Miller
- Written by: Adir Miller; Ran Sarig
- Starring: Adir Miller; Lior Halfon; Niro Levy; Yael Sharony; Liat Har-lev
- Opening theme: "Lo Rotze LeHitbager" (Don't Want to Grow Up) by Muki & Useless ID
- Country of origin: Israel
- No. of seasons: 4
- No. of episodes: 51 (list of episodes)

Production
- Running time: 24 minutes
- Production company: Kuperman Productions

Original release
- Network: Channel 2 (Keshet)
- Release: 24 March 2008 – 3 July 2014

Related
- Traffic Light

Ramzor (Hebrew: רַמְזוֹר; lit. Traffic Light) is an Israeli sitcom. The program was created by Adir Miller, who also co-authored the screenplay (along with Ran Sarig) and also appears in the program in the leading role.

The series ran for four seasons on Israeli Channel 2 (on Keshet) between 2008–2014. The fourth season was announced as the final one.

In early 2010, Fox purchased the rights for an American adaptation of the series, Traffic Light, which premiered on 8 February 2011.

In 2010 the series won an Israeli TV Academy Award (פרס האקדמיה לטלוויזיה) in the Best comedy series category and also became the first Israeli TV series that won the International Emmy Award in the Best comedy series category.

Around 2016, Lithuanian production company, Videometra, purchased the rights for a Lithuanian adaptation for the series, Šviesoforas, which premiered on 13 March 2017 on TV3.

== Background ==
The show revolves around three friends in their mid-thirties living in Givatayim. Each of them with a distinct personal status, symbolized by the three colors of a traffic light.
Itzko is the "red light"; married with a 7-year-old daughter.
Amir is the "yellow light"; He lives with his girlfriend, Tali.
Hefer is the "green light"; He has no permanent partner.

== Characters ==
- Amir Rosner (Adir Miller) is an event director. He lives with his girlfriend Tali, a flight attendant, and her dog Yardena. Amir has a healthy relationship with Tali although he hates her dog.
- Eyal (Itzko) Itzkovich (Lior Halfon) is married to Lilach and is the father of Danielle. He owns a magic store and is characterized as cheap. His relationship with his wife Lilach is rather poor.
- Hefer Guri (Nir Levy) is a single "party animal" who often changes girlfriends. As a single man, with a lot of relationship-experience, he gives advice to his two friends, usually about relationship "problems".
- Lilach Itzkovich-Yafa (Yael Sharoni) is Itzko's wife. She is a journalist with a very strict and serious personality.
- Tali Rosner (née Dvir) (Liat Harlev) Amir's Girlfriend. Tali met Amir during his work as a director. Tali works as a flight attendant
- Danielle Itzkovich (Yuval Vin) Itzko and Lilach's daughter. Danielle is 7 years old yet very mature, cynical and sophisticated for her age. She loves watching the news and bossing around her parents.

== International response ==
After the success in Israel, the TV series was adapted into various versions in the United States and Russia. The Russian version - Svetofor (Светофор) became very successful and had finished the 9th season in STS Channel.

The American version was cancelled after one season of 13 episodes.

Mongolian version was made called "Гэрлэн дохио" in October 2016 by Education TV and lasted for 2 seasons.

A Greek version of the show was broadcast for one season of 63 episodes, under the title Gia Panta Paidia (Για πάντα παιδιά). The show was one of the first shows that broadcast on the renamed Open TV in the 2018-2019 season.
