= The Matchmaker (2010 film) =

- Film poster
- פעם הייתי
- Directed by: Avi Nesher
- Screenplay by: Avi Nesher
- Based on: When Heroes Fly by Amir Gutfreund
- Produced by: Avi Nesher; Ishay Mor; Chilik Michaeli
- Starring: Adir Miller; Tuval Shafir
- Cinematography: Michel Abramowicz
- Edited by: Isaac Sehayek
- Music by: Philippe Sarde
- Production company: Metro Communications
- Distributed by: Menemsha Films
- Release date: October 17, 2010 (Toronto International Film FestivalTIFF)
- Running time: 112 minutes
- Country: Israel
- Language: Hebrew
- Budget: ₪7,684,104

The Matchmaker (Hebrew: פעם הייתי, lit. "Once I Was") is a 2010 Israeli drama film written, directed and produced by Avi Nesher, based on the novel When Heroes Fly by award-winning author Amir Gutfreund. It premiered as an official selection at the 2010 Toronto International Film Festival and later that year won the Silver Plaque award at the Chicago International Film Festival. It received seven nominations for Israel's Ophir Awards in 2010, including Best Picture, where Adir Miller also won in the Best Actor category and Maya Dagan won in the Best Actress category.

== Synopsis ==
The plot of the movie, except for the opening and closing scenes, takes place in Haifa over the course of one month in the summer of 1968. A special bond forms between Arik (played by Tuval Shafir), a 16-year-old boy, and Yaakov Bride (Adir Miller), a scarred matchmaker, bachelor, and Holocaust survivor. Bride and Arik’s father, Yuji (Dov Navon), were childhood friends in Romania, and Bride offers Arik, who is a fan of detective novels, a summer job: to spy on matchmaking clients and recruit new ones. Bride’s office is located in a passageway next to a movie theater owned by seven dwarves, all from the same Romanian family, who survived Auschwitz because Josef Mengele conducted experiments on them.

At the same time, Arik experiences his first great love that summer when Tamara (Neta Porat), comes to visit for summer vacation from the United States. Tamara is also the rebellious and provocative cousin of Benny, Arik’s best friend (Tam Gal), which puts the boys’ friendship to the test.

Arik also becomes friends with Clara (Maya Dagan), a Holocaust survivor of Romanian descent, who works as a guide for Bride’s shy and inexperienced clients. Additionally, she and Bride run an underground and illegal nighttime card club at her home. Bride is in love with her, and although she has been through severe traumas during the Holocaust and isn’t ready to commit to him (or anyone else), he is willing to wait as long as it takes for her to be ready.

Arik often spends much of his time at the city library. When Meir (Dror Keren), a lonely and melancholy librarian, hears that Arik works for a matchmaker, he asks to be introduced to him. Bride sends Meir for a lesson with Clara, and Meir falls in love with her, deciding that she is the one he wants. Although both Bride and Clara herself try to dissuade him, he doesn’t give up and continues to pursue her. When he discovers the special connection between Bride and Clara, he is determined to get Bride out of the way. He starts investigating and claims that Yaakov Bride isn’t his real name. He also finds out about Bride’s side job as a smuggler and the card club he runs with Clara. Meir informs the police, who raid Clara’s home, and later Bride’s office. Though Bride and Clara are clever and cautious (and receive an early warning from Arik), and the police come up empty-handed, rumors begin to spread. A story about the suspicions is published in the weekly magazine HaOlam HaZeh, prompting Clara to cut off ties with Bride. Heartbroken, he disappears without a trace. Arik only saw him one more time—at Clara’s funeral, a few years later.

The opening and closing scenes of the movie take place 38 years later, during the Second Lebanon War. Arik and his father are summoned to the office of a lawyer (Yaakov Bodo), who informs them that Yaakov Bride has passed away and left all his possessions to Arik.

Some of the messages from Yankele Bride as a matchmaker, as expressed in the movie:

- “A matchmaker is supposed to give not what you want, but what you need.”
- “A matchmaker with a soul thinks well of a person first and foremost. Sees a limping man, says good match—he won’t run after women. Blind—excellent, he won’t look left or right. Mute—very good, no arguments at home.”
- “A man doesn’t have to be attractive. Tomorrow I’ll set you up with a guy who looks like Paul Newman. You get married, go on a honeymoon, a Rottweiler attacks, ruins the face—no more Paul Newman face. You’d leave him now because he’s not attractive? No, right?”
- “Love at first sight means divorce at second sight.”

== Cast ==
- Tuval Shafir as Arik Burstein
- Adir Miller as Yankel Braiyd
- Maya Dagan as Clara Epstein
- Dror Keren as Meir the Librarian
- Dov Navon as Yozi Burstein
- Yarden Bar-Kochba as Nili Burstein
- Neta Porat as Tamara
- Bat-El Papura as Sylvia
- Kobi Farag as Moshe Abadi
- Yael Leventhal as Tikva Abadi
- Tom Gal as Benny Abadi
- Eyal Shechter as Arik Burstein (adult)
- Yaakov Bodo as Adv. Segalson
- Eli Yatzpan as Uncle Nadgi

== Themes ==
The film evokes the Holocaust and characters bear emotional and physical scars from the tragedy. Nesher spoke about the film with The Forward and explained: “The Holocaust is so deeply embedded in the national consciousness,”, adding, “You consider yourself an outcast — being a child of parents who are Holocaust survivors. It is an overriding experience and emotion, so you become sympathetic to everything outcast and very open to it.”

== Reception ==
The film earned seven nominations for the Ophir Awards, with the film's stars, Adir Miller and Maya Dagan winning the Best Actor and Best Actress prizes.

Hannah Brown, film critic at The Jerusalem Post praised how the "immensely pleasurable and moving film manages to weave the many strands of its plot to create a portrait of Israel in 1968 that sheds light on the country today, and does so without sacrificing drama to polemics." Brown continued: "What shines forth are the characters and the story, and in the end nothing else in the movie really matters. You may not even notice that Avi Nesher has made a complex and ambitious film, one of the most rewarding in Israel in years."

Nicolas Rapold gave the film a positive review in The New York Times, praising Nesher's "knack for sketching characters’ personal rationales and considerable emotional burdens without letting any one of them commandeer the film’s tone." Rapold continued, raising how Nesher "conveys how secrets and suspicions come naturally to those who undergo unspeakable suffering, but he also devotes attention to Arik’s harmless adolescent angst over Tamara."

== Soundtrack ==
- Yehezkel – The High Windows
- Yona Paamona
- White Rabbit – Jefferson Airplane
- Sunshine of your Love – Cream
