= Ofira Asayag =

Israeli journalist

- אופירה אסייג
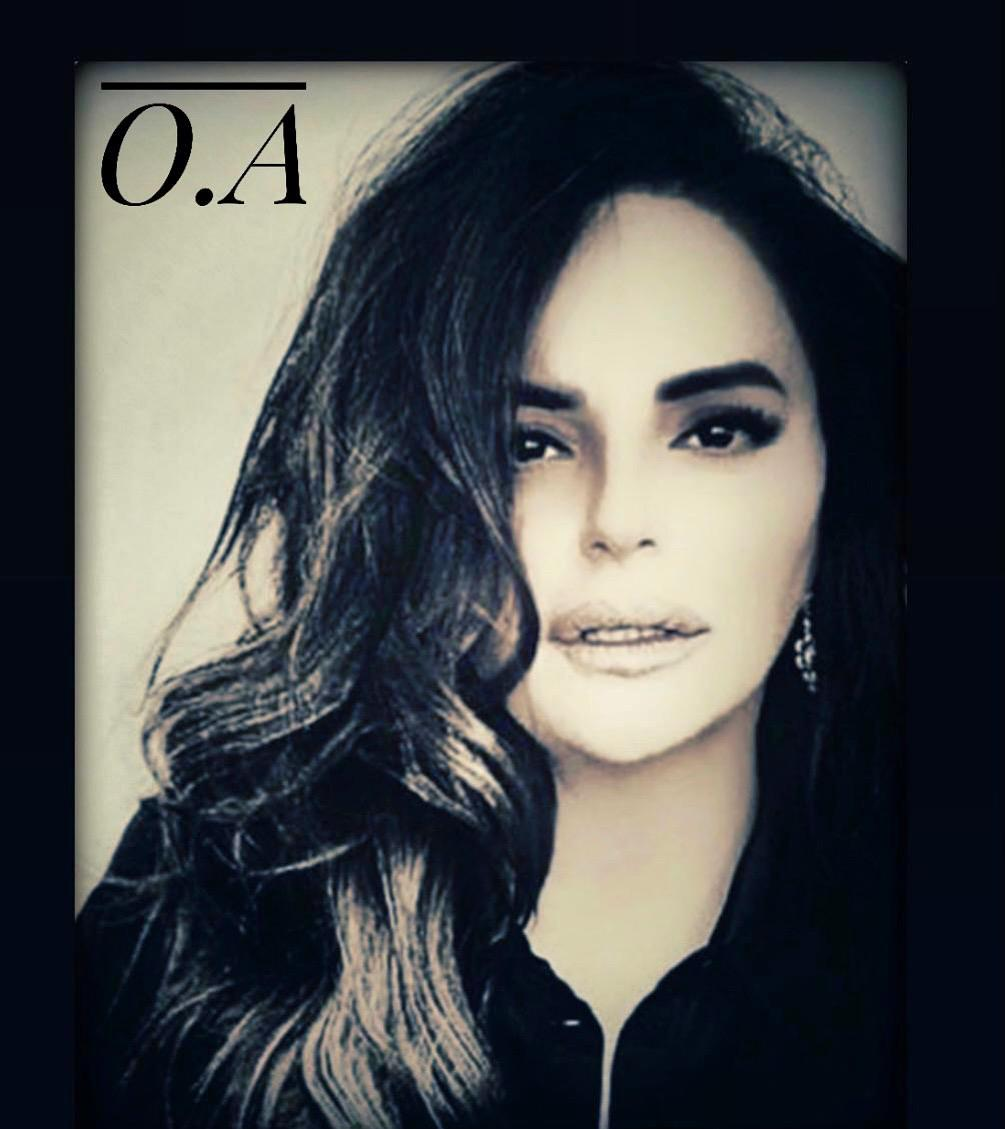
- Born: 6 October 1973 (age 52); Dimona, Israel
- Occupations: TV host, Radio broadcaster
- Employer(s): ONE, Radio Tel Aviv, Channel 12 (Israel)

Ofira Asayag (Hebrew: אופירה אסייג) is an Israeli TV host, radio broadcaster and sports reporter. In the past, she also served as a presenter of sports programs on television.

== Biography ==
Ofira Asayag was born on 6 October 1973 (the first day of the Yom Kippur War) in Dimona. She is the fourth child born among six brothers and sisters to parents who immigrated from Morocco. She studied at the state-religious school "Appelman". After her military service, she worked at a hair salon, and then worked at the licensing office in Be’er Sheva.

Asayag began her career in sports media as a sideline reporter at the Israel Broadcasting Authority from 1996 to 2002. She mainly worked on the radio program "Songs and Goals" and television broadcasts of football and basketball games. In October 2002 she started working in the sports broadcasts of Channel 2. She was denied the opportunity to continue working at the Broadcasting Authority simultaneously. She lost a lawsuit against the Broadcasting Authority at the Labor Court, since it was determined that she worked as a freelancer and did not have an employee-employer relationship with the Authority. On Channel 2, she presented the sports section in the morning show "Cafe Talad" by Yardena Arazi and Dov Gil-har.

In 2000 Asayag joined the ONE sports website as a flash reporter and is responsible for the "Glitch" section, which deals with sports gossip. Soon after she became the coordinator of the articles and then the content manager of the site. She still holds this position today, while simultaneously maintaining her other occupations in parallel.

In the beginning of 2004, she created the film "The Big Miss", a documentary about the life and conviction of Israeli football player Felix Halfon.

In 2006, businessman Arcadi Gaydamak recruited Asayag as the director of the sports department and presenter at the Radio Station 99, which he had recently purchased. Asayag began running a program together with Eyal Berkovic. In addition, she began presenting a program on the TV channel of the Beitar Jerusalem Football Club (which was also owned by Gaydamak) and produced a documentary about the group. However, after about two years, Radio 99 ran into financial difficulties and was sold to 103FM. However, in August 2010, Asayag and Berkovic left 103FM, due to disagreements with the station's management.

In February 2010, she created a documentary about Moni Fanan, which was broadcast on Channel 2.

In June 2011, Asayag and Berkovic signed a 3-year contract with Tel Aviv Radio to contribute to their daily sports segment. Subsequently, the program was broadcast as a national syndicate that also expanded to Israeli waves, Southern Radio, Haifa Radio, Jerusalem Radio, and others. At the time, the Tel Aviv Radio's sports segment had an estimate of 132,000 daily listeners.

In February 2015, she won a defamation lawsuit she filed against the journalists Shlomo Man, Oded Kramer and Raviv Shechter, and it was ruled that Kramer and Shechter together would be required to pay her compensation of NIS 30,000 plus NIS 10,000 court costs, and that Man would pay compensation of NIS 75,000 plus 15,000 NIS court costs.

The same week, a ruling was reached in another defamation lawsuit filed by the Youth and Children's league against Asayag and Berkovic. Two soccer referees of the Youth and Children's league were reprimanded on live radio by Asayag and Berkovic for denying water break privileges to the teenage players. In the lawsuit, one of the referees demanded NIS 200,000 and the other demanded 100,000 as compensation for defamation. The judge ruled that Asayag and Berkovic would have to compensate one of the referees with NIS 45,000 and attorney fees of NIS 9,000 and Asayag, Berkovic, and Ayal Farr (the show's editor) would have to compensate the other referee with NIS 35,000 and attorney fees of NIS 7,000.

In 2016, she joined the panel of judges for the fourth season of the show Eyal Golan Is Calling You.

In November 2017, she began to present a weekly television show on Fridays with Eyal Berkovic called Ofira and Berkovic, on Keshet Channel 12. During the 2018 World Cup, they hosted the program "Lila Ham" on the same channel, from Sunday to Thursday.

== Personal life ==
Asayag is married to Gili Menkin and is a mother of three. Menkin is one of the owners of the ONE site and channel, and they met when she served as the site's content editor. The couple married in 2008. After 12 years, in 2018 they separated, however returned to live together in 2019. They live in Tel Aviv.

In an interview with "At" magazine in September 2020, she said: "Today I don't believe in the institution of marriage, it's unnecessary to get married, and if you marry, then you're a citizen, but not in the rabbinate. Is a person who has sat in the kollel all his life going to tell me what to do? I hope my daughter doesn't marry into the rabbinate."
