= One (website) =

Israeli news site

ONE
- Type: Private Company
- Industry: News, Internet Portal
- Genre: Sports news
- Founded: 1999
- Headquarters: Ramat Gan, Israel
- Key people: Udi Milner and Gil Menkin (Founders)
- Website: www.one.co.il

ONE (also known as ONE.co.il) is one of the major Israeli sports journalism outlets, websites, and television companies. It covers sports news from around the world, although it primarily covers soccer in Israel. According to the IARB (Israel Audience Research Board), it is one of the two biggest sports websites in Israel, along with Sport5.co.il. It categorized news into "Israeli Football", "World Football", "Israeli Basketball", "World Basketball" and "Other Sports".

== Overview ==
Haim Revivo, Eyal Berkovic, Alon Hazan, Alon Mizrahi, and Zvi Sherf are among ONE's columnists.

ONE was founded by Udi Milner and Gil Menkin in 1999. The website's headquarters are located in the BSR Towers in Ramat Gan. The website was founded in order to cover the TV show "The 91st minute", which was broadcast on Channel 2.

In the beginning of 2000, there was a race between Israeli sport websites, at the end, many of them came to an end. ONE survived through investments from the production company Telad. In 2007, Yedioth Ahronoth Group acquired 50% of the ownership of the website.
