= Adir Miller =

Israeli actor, screenwriter, and comedian

- אדיר מילר
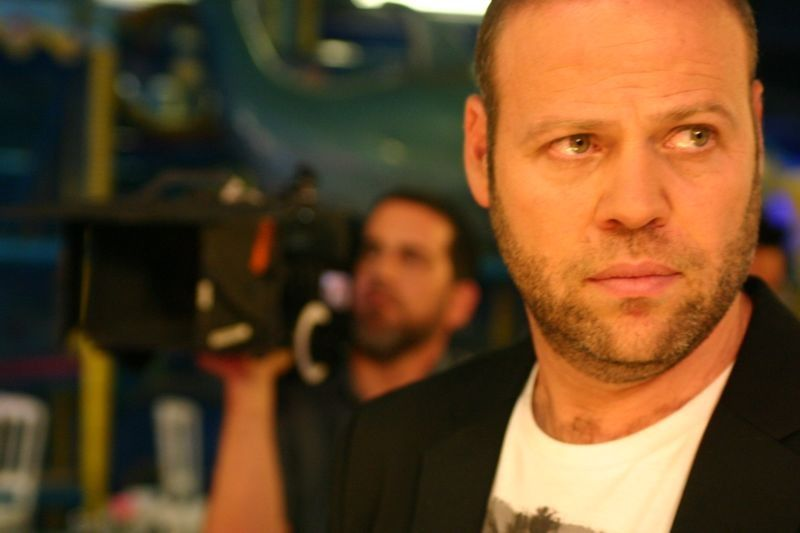
- Miller in 2013
- Born: 16 June 1974 (age 52); Holon, Israel
- Occupations: Actor, screenwriter, comedian
- Spouse: Sheli Kaspi
- Children: 3
- Awards: Ophir Award 2010 The Matchmaker; International Emmy Award 2010 Ramzor; Israeli Television Academy Award 2010 Ramzor

Adir Miller (Hebrew: אדיר מילר; born 16 June 1974) is an Israeli actor, screenwriter, and comedian. He is well known for his dry humor and his split second improvisation skills.

== Early life ==
Miller was born in Holon, Israel, to Jewish parents who were Holocaust survivors.

He served as a commander in the Unit 8200 of the Israel Defense Forces's Intelligence Corps.

== Career ==
=== Standup and television ===
Miller's professional career started in 1999, when he appeared in a stand-up comedy series called Domino, alongside Asi Cohen and Guri Alfi, among others. Afterwards he appeared in The Domino Effect and in Dudu Topaz's HaRishon BaBidur on the Israeli Channel 2.

In 2000, Miller started his own comedy show, named Adir Miller after himself. He simultaneously appeared as a comedian in Yair Lapid's talk show on Channel 2. In 2002, he began hosting his own humoristic talk show called The Adir Evening, which lasted 4 seasons. In 2005 he hosted the program Our Movie, and the satire show Culture Hall together with the Ma Kashur trio.

In 2008 Miller created and co-authored the sitcom Ramzor (lt. "traffic light") with screenwriter Ran Sarig. The show was broadcast on Israeli Channel 2. In 2010 the series won the Israeli Television Academy Award in the category of "Best Comedy Series" and was also the first Israeli television series to win an International Emmy Award in the Best Comedy category.

In 2008 Miller created and co-authored the Comedy drama Reset.

=== Theatre ===
In 2006 Miller appeared in the musical HaLahaka as Paul Aviv (the role which Tuvia Tzafir played in the original film). In 2009 Miller appeared in the leading role in the play Mother-In-Law in the Habima Theatre.

=== Film ===
In 2007 Miller played Yanki in the film The Secrets. In 2010 Miller played a lead role in Avi Nesher's film The Matchmaker. For this role Miller won an Ophir Award in 2010 in the best leading actor category. In 2013 Miller played a second lead role in Avi Nesher's film The Wonders.

In 2023, he returned to collaborate with Nesher in his film "Gan Kofim", where he played the character of Amitai Karib, a rebellious writer who fights for his position in the world of literature.

In 2024 he wrote and produced the movie "The Ring", based on his family's experience in Budapest during the Holocaust. Co-directed with the brothers Yoav Paz and Doron Paz, he plays the adult Arnon Nobel who, as a baby, was saved by his mother's instinctive sense of preservation by giving a ring to the Arrow Cross soldier who wants to kill them.

== Personal life ==
He is married to Israeli therapist Sheli Kaspi, and has three children. They reside in Givatayim, Israel.
