= Shay Gabso =

Israeli singer (born 1984)

Shay Gabso שי גבסו
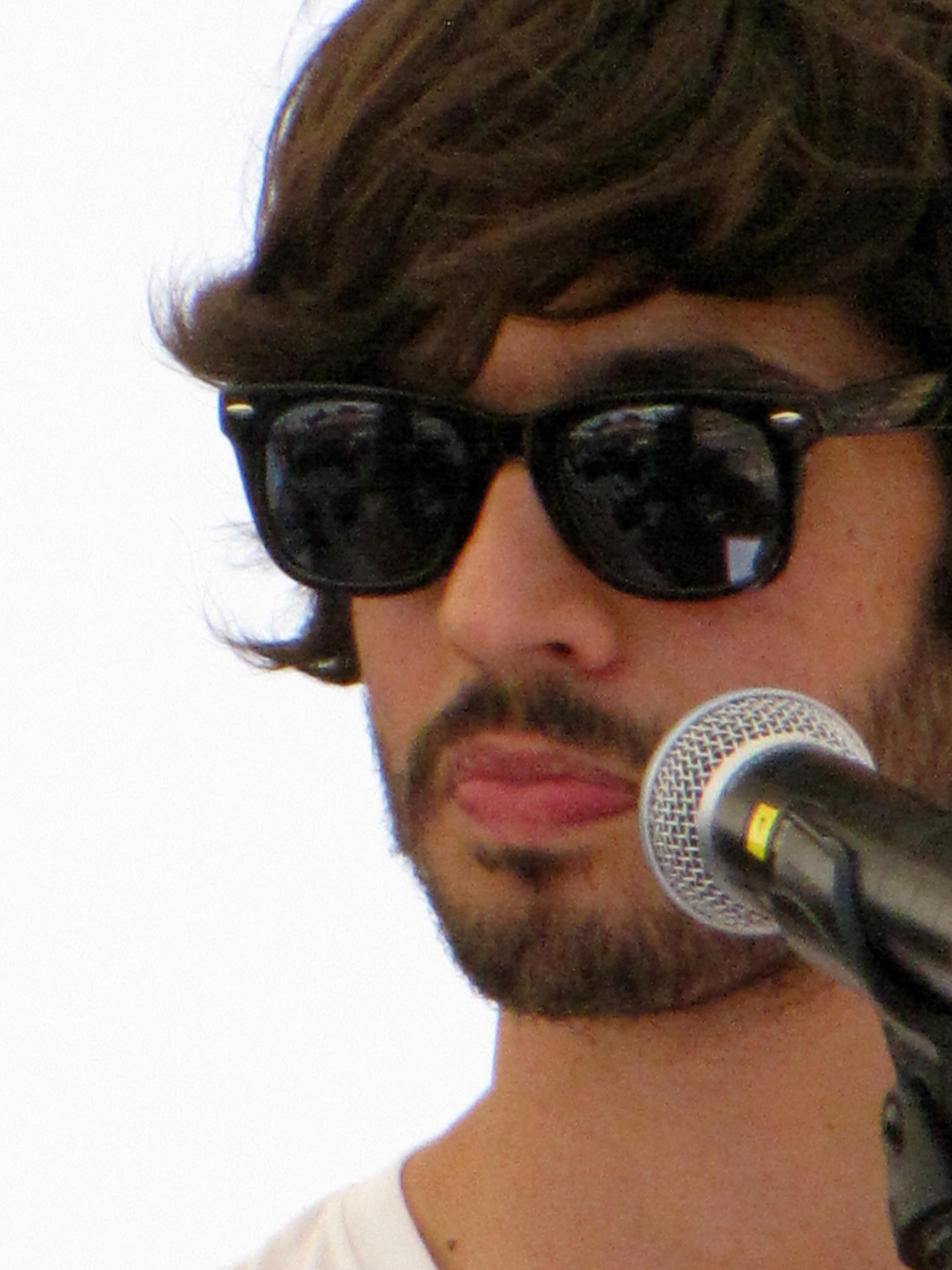

Background information
- Born: 20 July 1984 (age 42); Rishon LeZion, Israel
- Occupations: Singer-songwriter, actor
- Instrument: Vocals
- Website: www.gabso.com

Shay Gabso (Hebrew: שי גבסו; born 20 July 1984) is an Israeli actor and singer. He won third place in the first season of Kokhav Nolad ("A Star is Born") and first place in the second season of The Singer in the Mask.

== Early life ==
Gabso was born in Rishon LeZion to a Tunisian-Jewish family. He became religiously observant at the age of twelve.

== Career ==
He began his military service in the Israel Defense Forces in the early 2000s, serving as a composer for the Israeli Air Force Band. During his military service, he appeared on the first season of Kokhav Nolad. Gabso's single Arim Roshi (I Will Lift My Head) has been hailed as a patriotic anthem. He collaborates with Nefesh Yehudi, a Jewish outreach organization that exposes secular college-age students in Israel and Europe to Judaism. In 2022 he had a stage role, in a production of Fiddler on the Roof at Heichal HaTarbut.

== Personal life ==
He married Hagar Anush in 2011, divorcing two years later. He has had relationships with both men and women.

In an interview on Channel 12 in early 2022, he described himself as bisexual. In December 2022, he stated that he identifies as "spiritual," but does not observe religious commandments: "Today I'm not a religious person, not at all. But I also don’t like the term 'leaving religion'. I've found many other answers".

In 2024, he became the father of a baby girl that he is co-parenting with a female friend.
