= Kevin Rubin =

Israeli YouTuber (born 1993)

- קְווִין רוּבִּין
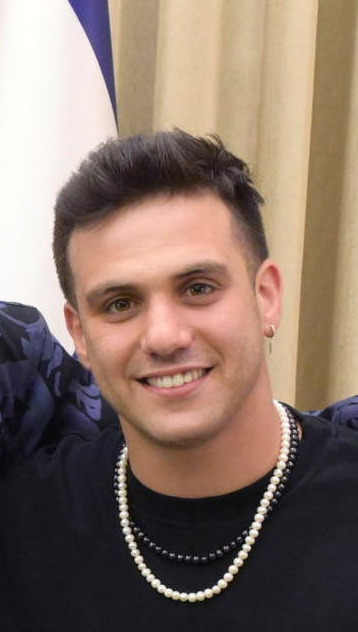
- Born: June 17, 1993 (age 33); Herzliya, Israel
- Occupations: Actor, network host, internet celebrity, YouTuber
- Years active: 2017-present

Kevin Alfonso Rubin (born 1993) (Hebrew: קְווִין אלפונסו רוּבִּין) is an Israeli actor, network host, internet celebrity, and YouTuber.

== Biography ==
Robin was born in Herzliya and later moved with his family to Kfar Saba. As a child his hobbies included surfing, skateboarding and breakdancing. He had difficulty in school and was diagnosed with ADHD.

Upon being conscripted to the Israel Defense Forces, he joined the spokesman unit. Upon his release from the army, he began studying acting at Technique, an Israeli acting school. During this period he worked as a surf instructor, and in the process played guest roles in the youth series Wave Breakers, "Partners", in the movie Moon in House 12, as well as in several commercials. Later he decided to leave his jobs and focus on videos on the web.

At the beginning of 2017, he started posting parody videos on Instagram about situations from everyday life that went viral. In August 2017 he released the song "La Piv Bella" with Idan Telmore. By the end of the year, Rubin's Instagram page had gained about 200,000 followers. His Instagram video "The Unicorn Challenge" was chosen for the Instagram video of the year at the Playcon festival 2017. Rubin also won the 2017 Network Star of the Year award from the Buzzerim website.

In September 2017, together with celebrity Raz Sapani, he created the network series "Kevin and Raz - Haim Baharta", which was broadcast on their YouTube channel. As part of the series, six network stars lived in a villa in Caesarea which was called "The Colosseum" (when in the past they were in a penthouse in Netanya and a villa in Even Yehuda) from which they would vlog everyday. Every day a 7-minute long episode was released that presents challenges and attractions for teenagers. The network series is funded by companies that pay for product placement. The series was a success, and each episode has been viewed about 200 thousand views. The Tube television program awarded the series first place for "Network stars of Hebrew year 5778 (2018)".

In June 2018, Rubin participated in the Instagram series "Insta-Babe". In July 2018, Rubin published the song "Hakol charata" (Everything is a sin) together with Sapani and the rapper Feld, which has accumulated approximately 4.7 million views as of February 2022. In August 2018, the Frogi website ranked Rubin and Sapani in 45th place out of 70 youth stars of Israel. In September 2018, Rubin released the song "Lo Holchin Lishon" (We're not going to sleep) together with Sapani, which as of March 2020 has accumulated about 2.4 million views. Later, he published more of his songs that he recorded together with Shimi Tavori, Angel Burns, Edan Meiri, Rotem Kohen and Sapir Saban.

In August 2018, Rubin won the "Instagrammer of the Year", "YouTuber of the Year" and "Vlogger of the Year" awards at the Playcon Festival with the web series "Haim Bharta". He was also nominated for the "Breakthrough of the Year 2018" award on the Frogi website.

In January 2019, Rubin together with all the members of "Haim Bacharta" released the group's last vlog, after a year of ongoing activity.

In 2021, Rubin participated in the second season of the show The Masked Singer under the name "Chili" and was the sixth to be eliminated from the competition.

In 2022, together with his mother Karen, he participated in the program: MKR Winning Kitchen.

Rubin is married to Daniela Kristia, his partner in the network series "Haim Bharta" and they have two children. Rubin's sister is Kim Ben Shimon, who participated in the Boys and Girls reality TV show in 2020.

== Discography ==
=== Singles ===
- 2018: "Hakol Charata" (Everything's a sin) with Raz Sapani and Peled
- 2018: "Lo Holchin Lashon" (We're not going to sleep) with Raz Sapani and Vialo
- 2019: "Shishi Hafoch" (Freaky Friday) with Shimi Tavori
- 2019: "Sim Fam" with Angel Baranes
- 2019: "Ninja" with Idan Meiri
- 2020: "Kapara" (Atone) with Rotem Kohen
- 2021: "Shoponi" with Sapir Seven

== Filmography ==
=== Television ===
TV Show	Year	Role
Shovrei Galim	2014	Davash
Ta'aseh li Sa'av	2019	Himself
Israeli Children Warrior	2019	Moderator
Hatachana 2	2019	Himself, Orach
Mishpacha Behanfakah	2020	David
Ziggy	2020	Sivan
Habanim Vehabanot	2021	Moderator
The Singer in the Mask	2021	Chili
MKR Winning Kitchen	2022	
Full Speed (TV series)	2023	Nimrod Golan

=== Movies ===
Movie	Year	Role
Full Gas	2019	Nimrod
Full Speed	2021	Nimrod

=== Musical Theatre ===
Movie	Year	Role
Festigal Play	2019	Himself
My Festigal	2020	Himself
Festigal Sky High	2021	Wish coordinator

== Awards and nominations ==
Year	Award	Category	Nominee	Result
2021	The television awards competition for children and youth	Best Actor in a Drama Series	Ziggy (TV show)	Nominated
2022	Frogi's Picks of the Year Awards	Lead actor in a youth series	Golda and Meir, Ziggy (TV show)	Nominated
2022	Frogi's Picks of the Year Awards	YouTuber of the year	Kevin Rubin	Won

== See also ==
- MrShibolet
