= The Singer in the Mask season 1 =

The Singer in the Mask
- Season 1
- Starring: Ofira Asayag; Shahar Hason; Tzedi Tzarfati; Static & Ben El Tavori
- Hosted by: Ido Rosenblum
- Winner: Tzachi Halevy as "Rooster"
- Runner-up: Rinat Gabay as "Dragonfly"
- No. of episodes: 20

Release
- Original network: Channel 12
- Original release: 23 September – 5 December 2020

Season chronology
- Next → Season 2

The first season of the Israeli version of The Singer in the Mask premiered on Channel 12 on 23 September 2020 and concluded on 5 December 2020. The series was won by actor and singer Tzachi Halevy as "Rooster" with singer and children's star Rinat Gabay finishing second as "Dragonfly" and judoka Or Sasson finishing third as "Falafel".

== Panelists and host ==
Season 1 panelists and host

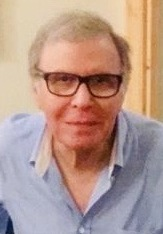
Tzedi Tzarfati

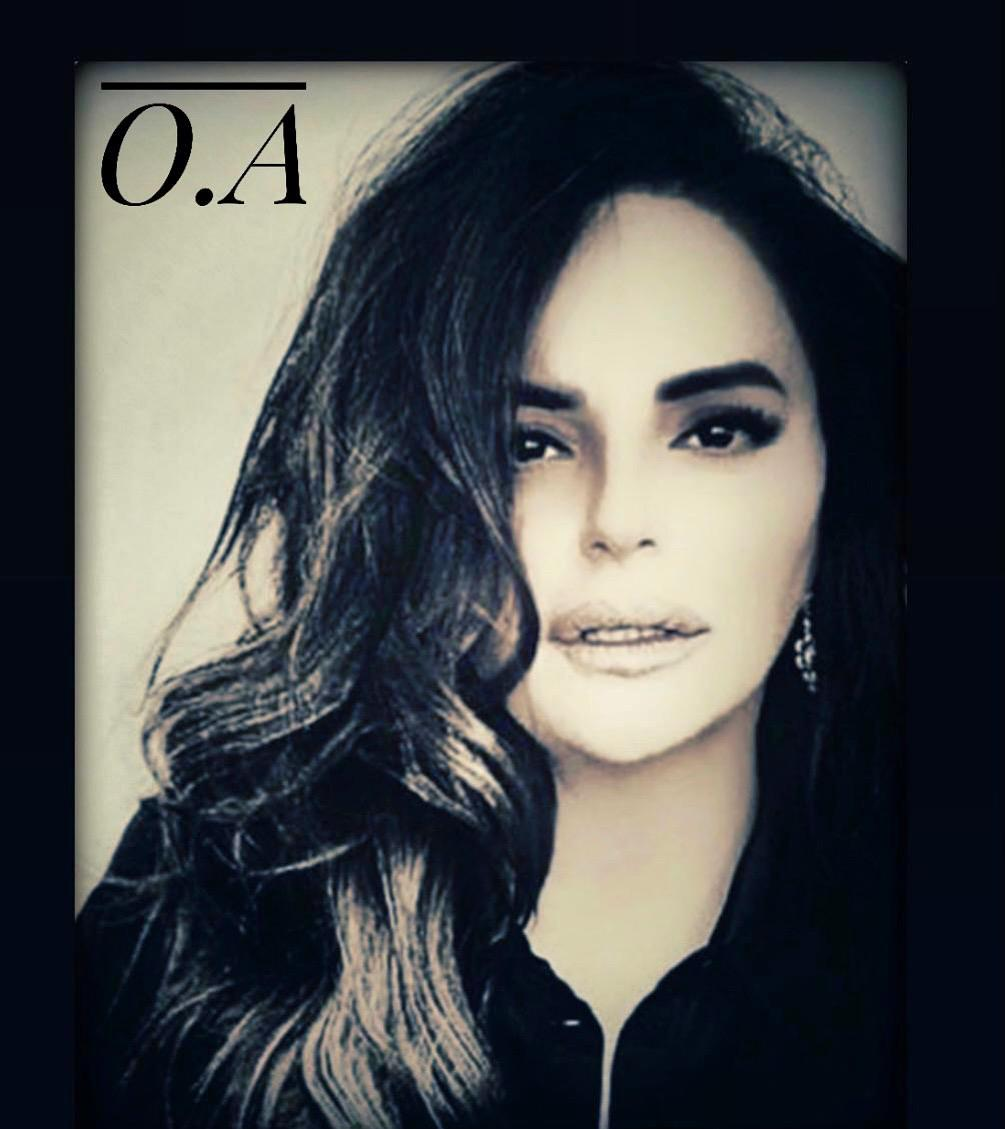
Ofira Asayag

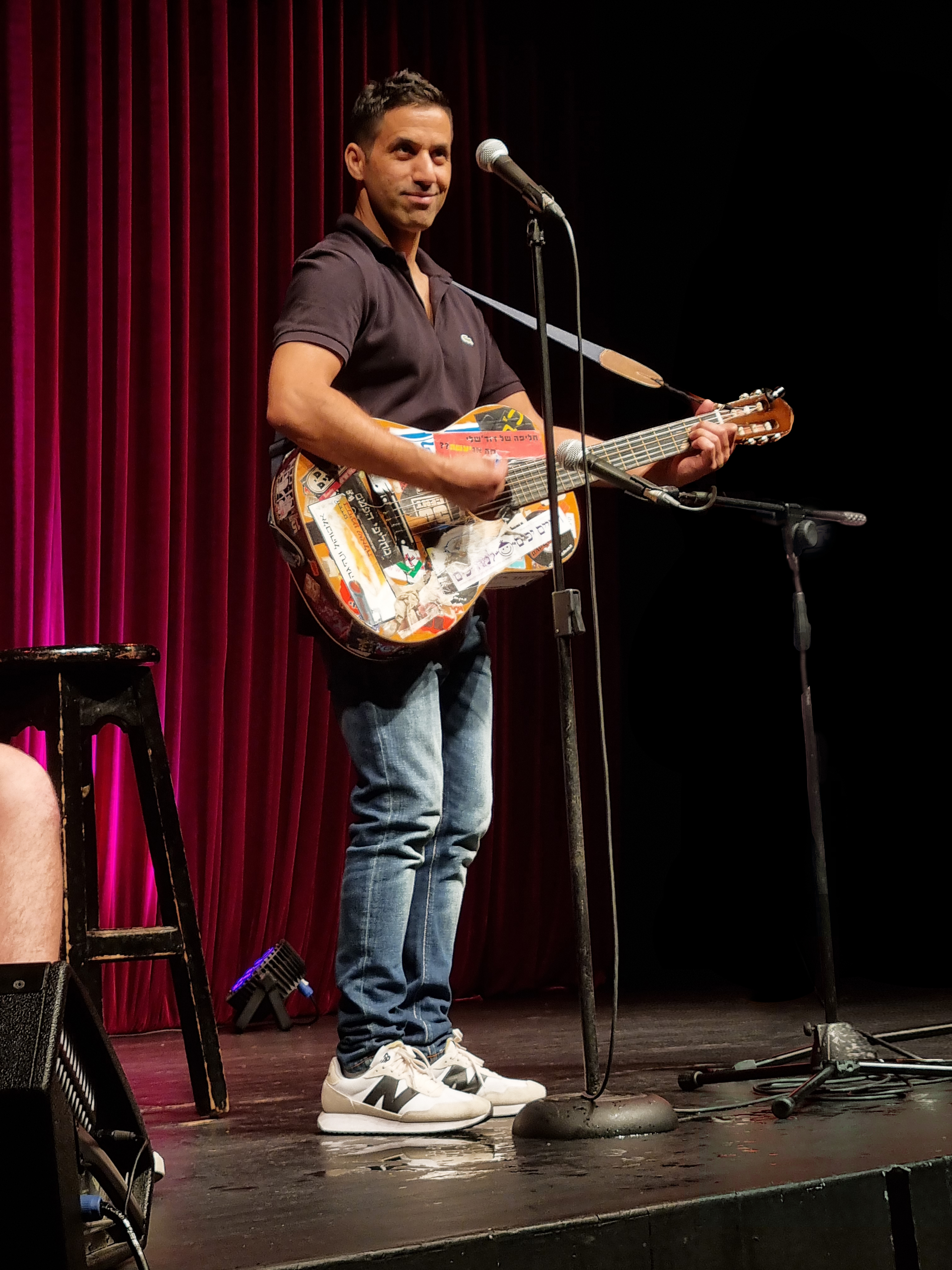
Shahar Hason

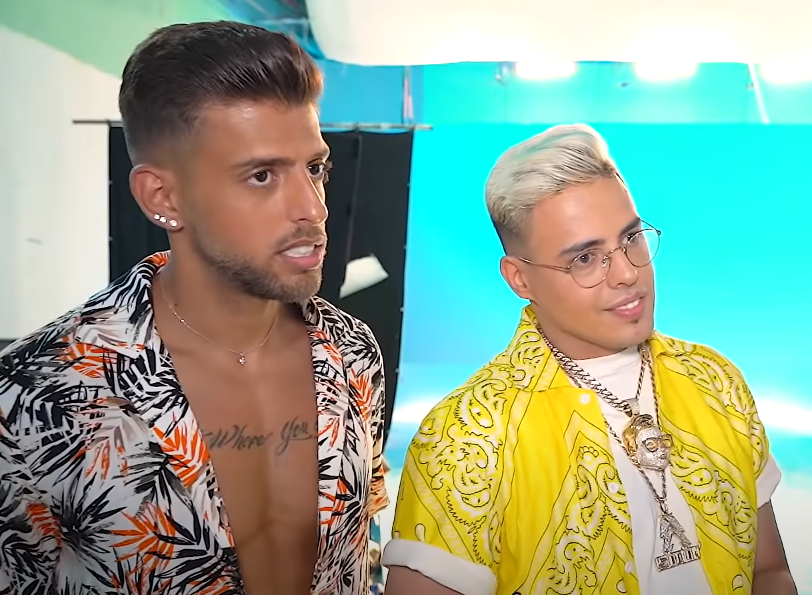
Static & Ben El Tavori

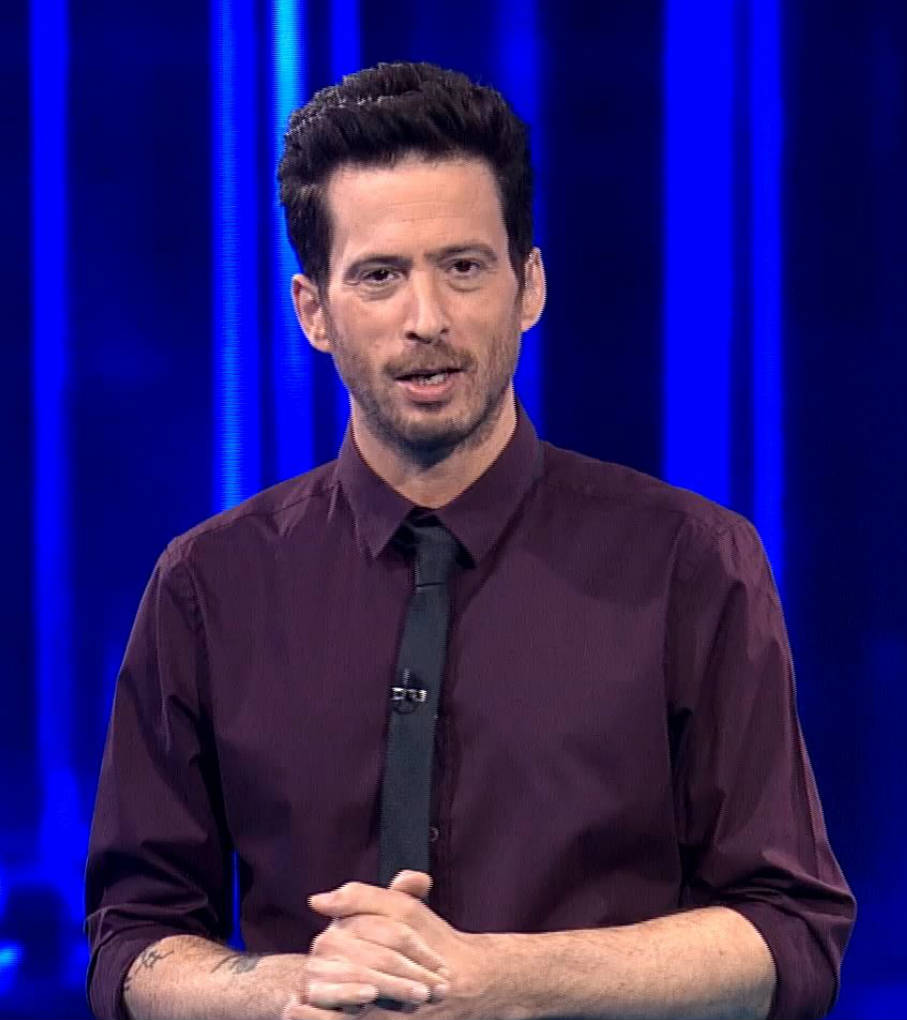
Ido Rosenblum

The show is hosted by television presenter Ido Rosenblum, with the judging panel consisting of journalist Ofira Asayag, comedian Shahar Hason, musical duo Static & Ben El Tavori, and director Tzedi Tzarfati.

=== Guest panelists ===
Throughout the first season, various guest judges appeared alongside the original, for one or two episodes.

These guest panelists have included:

Episode	Name	Notability
6-7	Miri Mesika	Singer and Actress
8-9	Michal Ansky	Gastronomist, Food Journalist and Television Personality
11-12	Haim Etgar	Television Personality and Journalist
13-14	Orna Banai	Actress and Comedian
15-16	Ilanit Levy	Model, Actress and Television Presenter
17-18	Shiri Maimon	Singer and Actress
19	Moshe Peretz	Singer

== Contestants ==
Stage name	Celebrity	Occupation	Episodes													
Stage name	Celebrity	Occupation	1	2	3	4/5	6/7	8/9	10	11/12	13/14	15/16	17/18	19	20	
Stage name	Celebrity	Occupation	1	2	3	4/5	6/7	8/9	10	11/12	13/14	15/16	17/18	19	A	B
Rooster	Tzachi Halevy (Note: Tzachi is married to the ninth placer "Stork", news anchor Lucy Aharish.)	Actor	SAFE		WIN		SAFE		RISK	SAFE	SAFE	SAFE	SAFE	SAFE	SAFE	WINNER
Dragonfly	Rinat Gabay	Singer		SAFE		WIN		SAFE	SAFE		SAFE	SAFE	SAFE	SAFE	SAFE	RUNNER-UP
Falafel	Or Sasson	Olympic athlete		SAFE		RISK	SAFE	SAFE	SAFE		SAFE	SAFE	SAFE	SAFE	THIRD	
Dragon	Itzik Cohen	Actor	SAFE		WIN		SAFE		RISK	SAFE	SAFE	SAFE	SAFE	OUT		
Goat	Galit Giat	Actress	SAFE		RISK		SAFE		RISK	SAFE	SAFE	SAFE	OUT			
Stork	Lucy Aharish (Note: Lucy is married to the season’s winner "Rooster", singer and actor Tzachi Halevy.)	News anchor		SAFE		WIN		SAFE	RISK	SAFE	SAFE	OUT				
Pickle	Einat Sarouf	Model	SAFE		WIN		SAFE		RISK	SAFE	OUT					
Popcorn	Orna Datz	Singer		SAFE		RISK		SAFE	RISK	OUT						
Mushroom	Michal Amdursky	Dancer		SAFE		WIN		OUT								
Bull	Izhar Cohen	Singer/Eurovision 1978 Winner	SAFE		RISK		OUT									
Shark	Dvir Benedek	Actor		SAFE		OUT										
Bear	Gadi Sukenik	Journalist	SAFE		OUT											
Cactus	Yinon Magal	Journalist		OUT												
Krembo	Tal Friedman	Comedian	OUT													

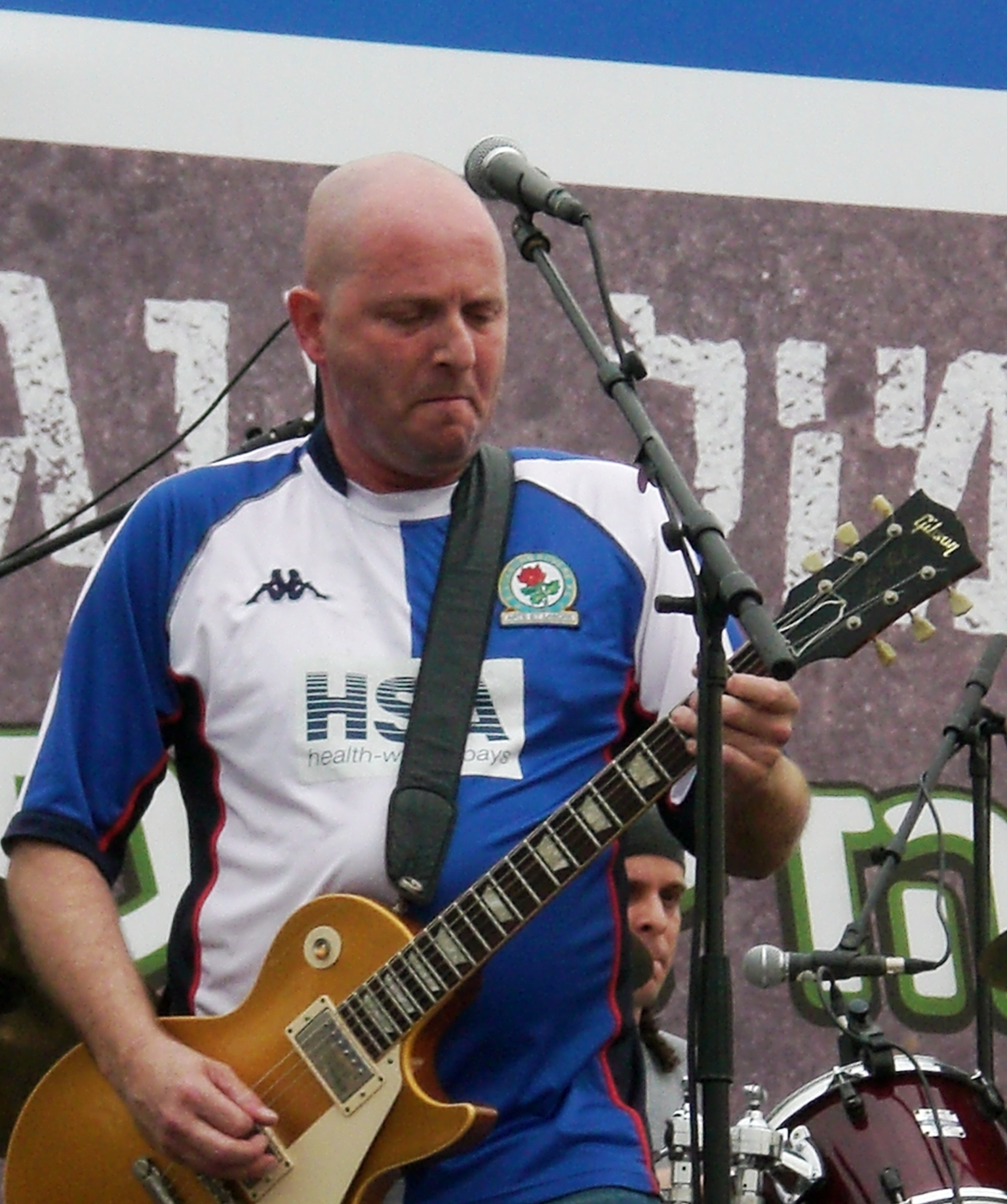
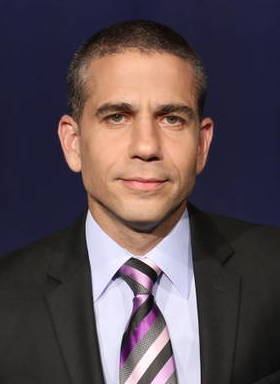
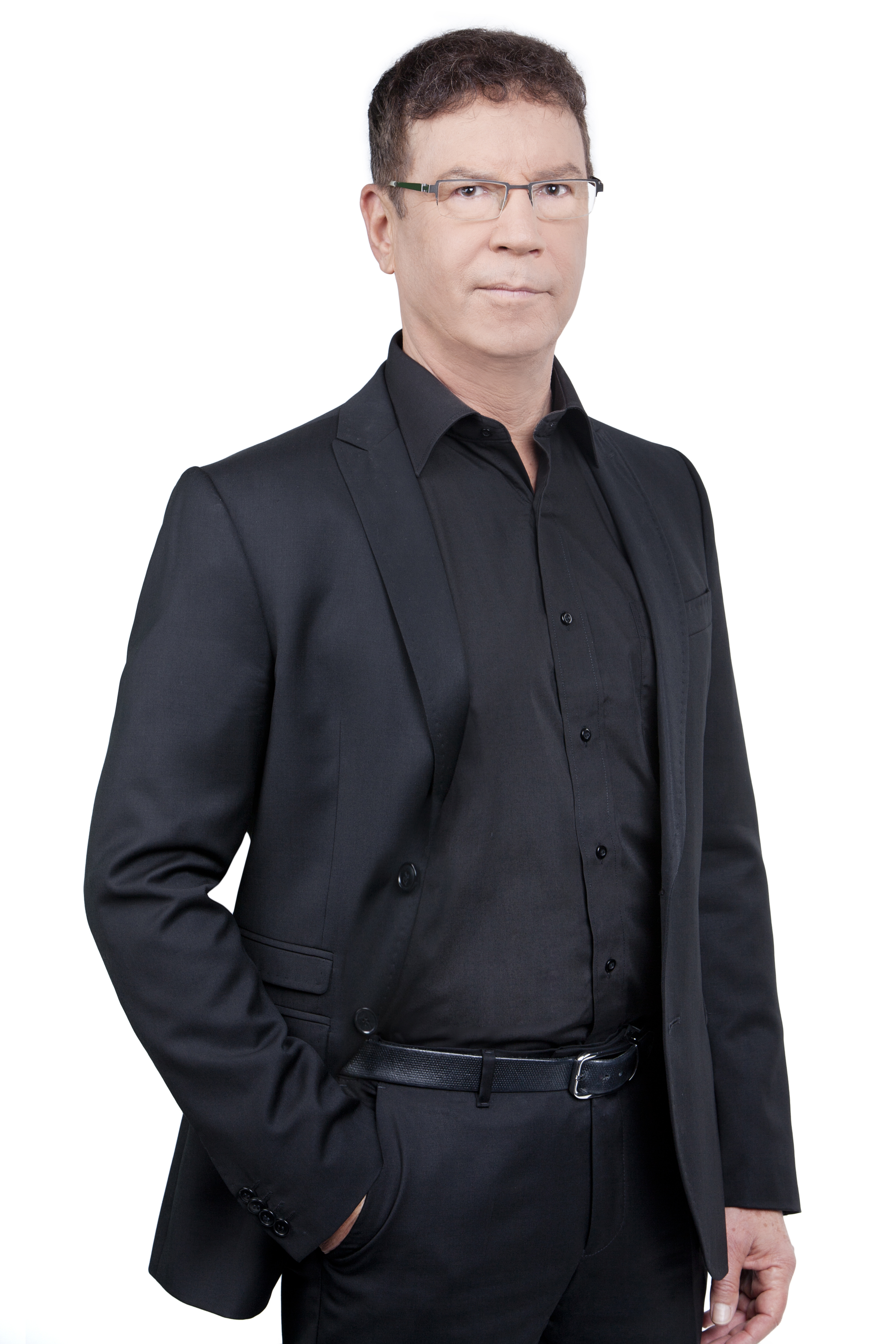
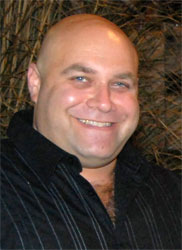
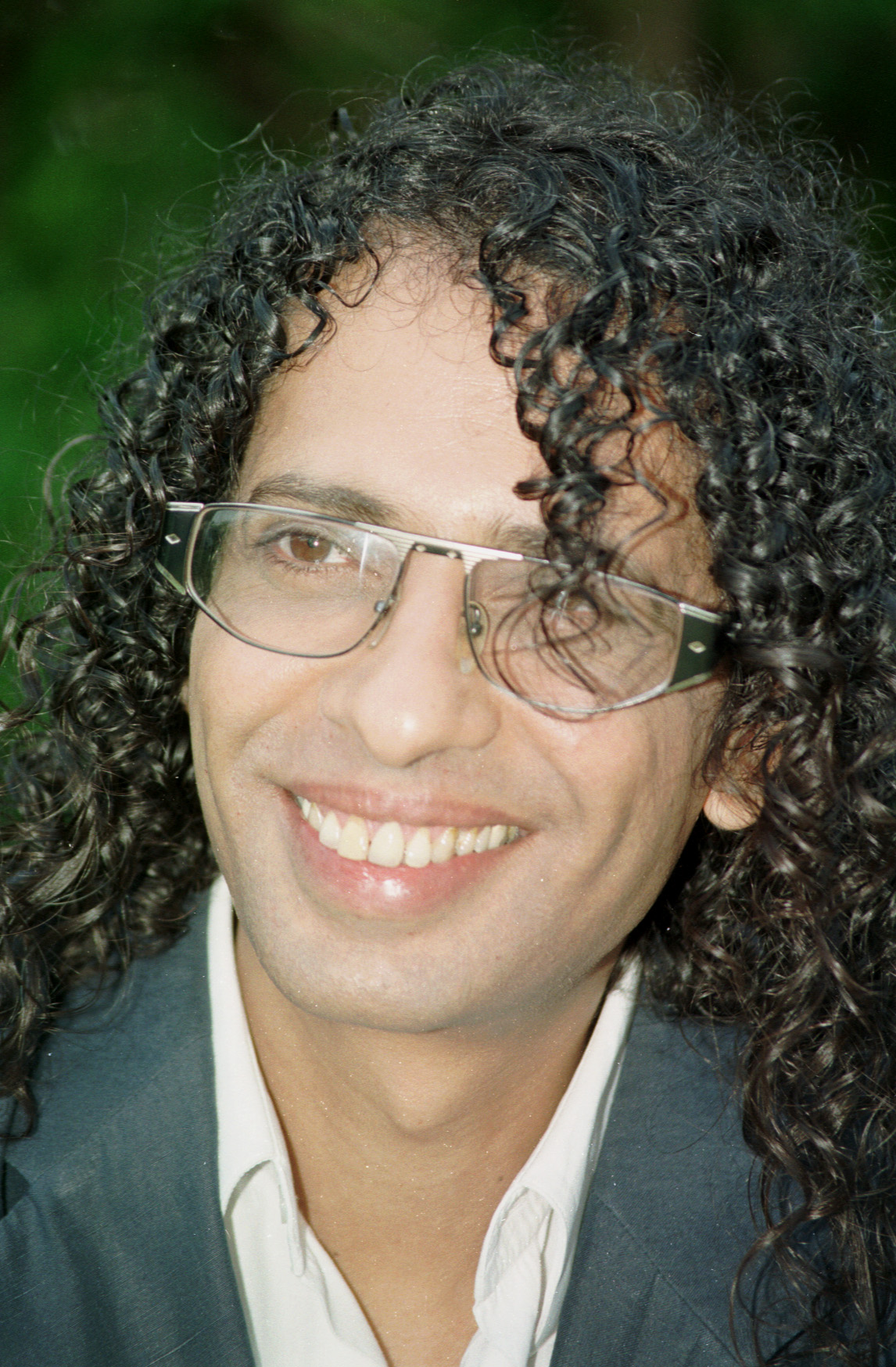
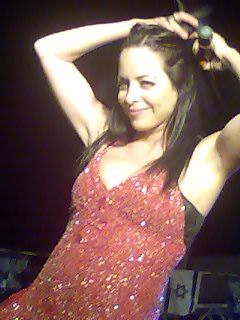
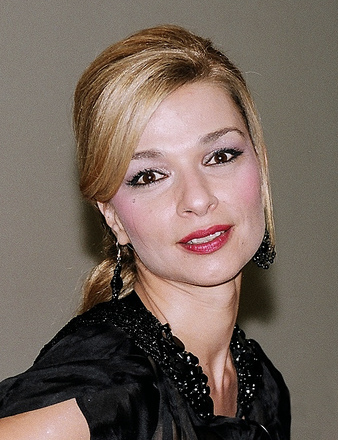
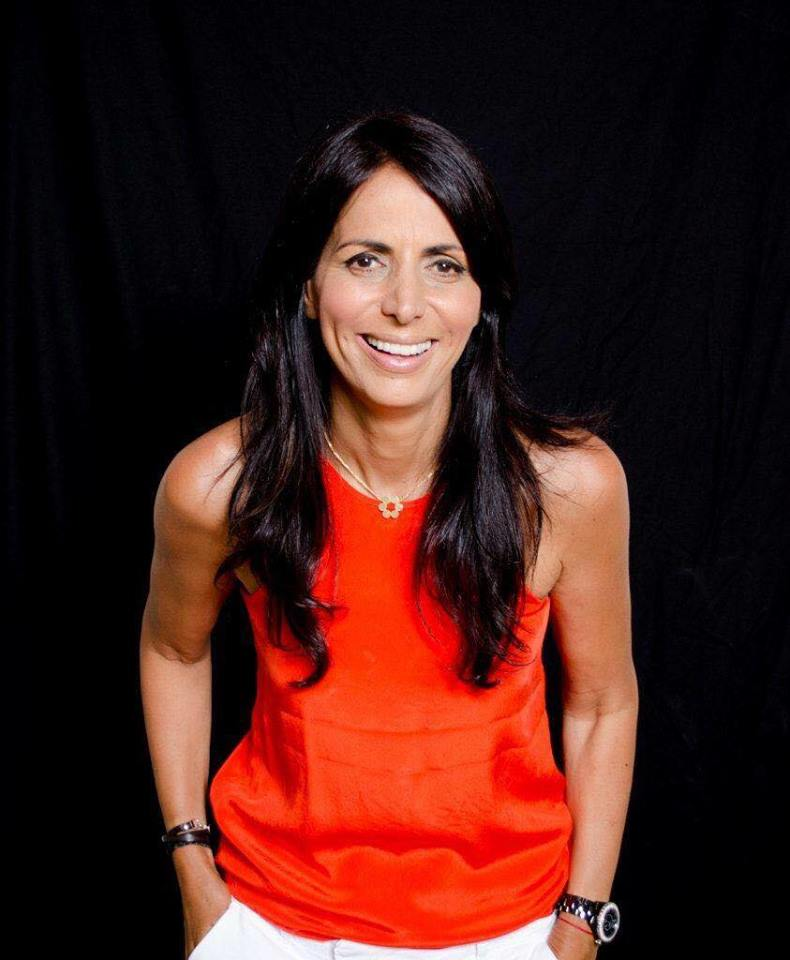
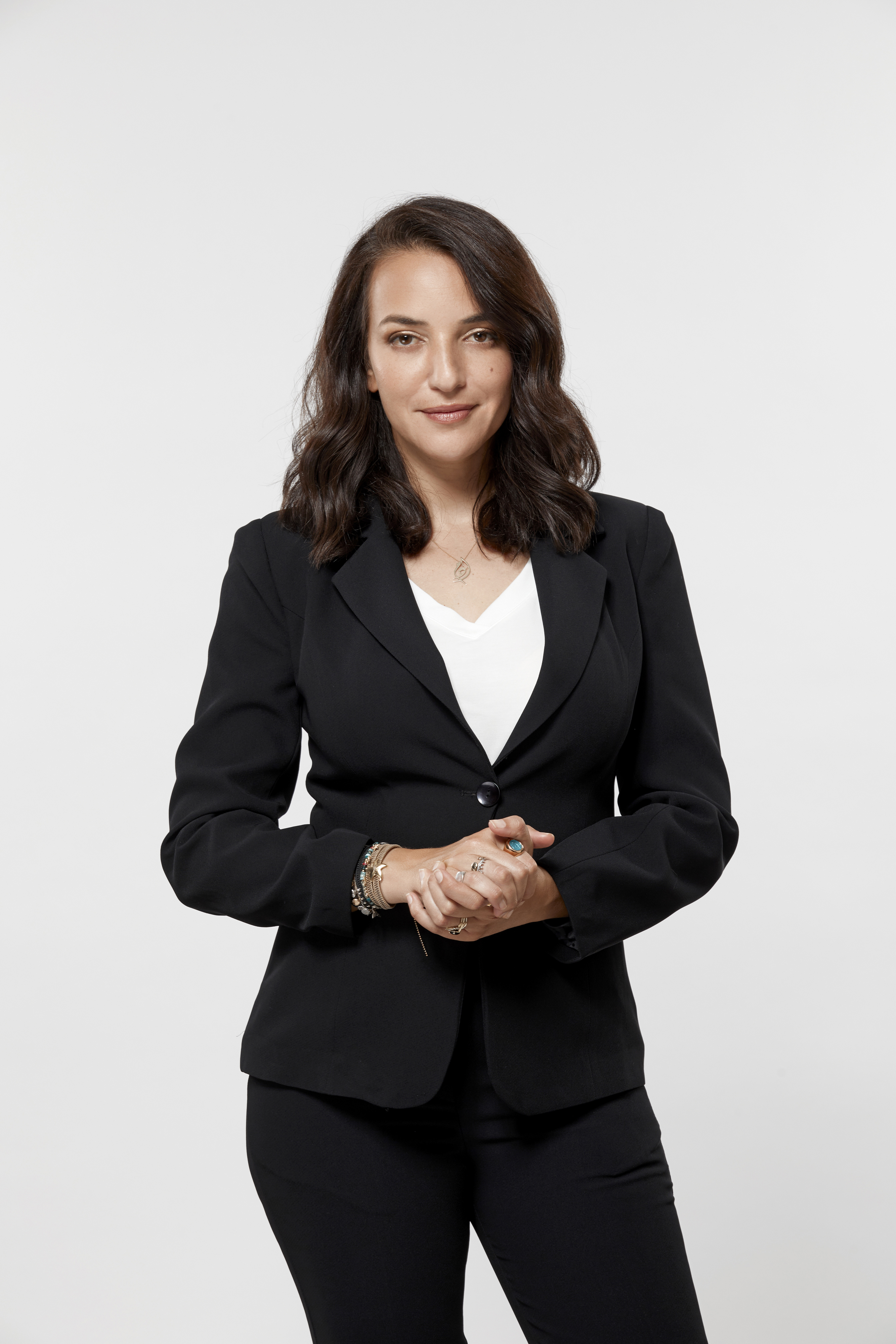
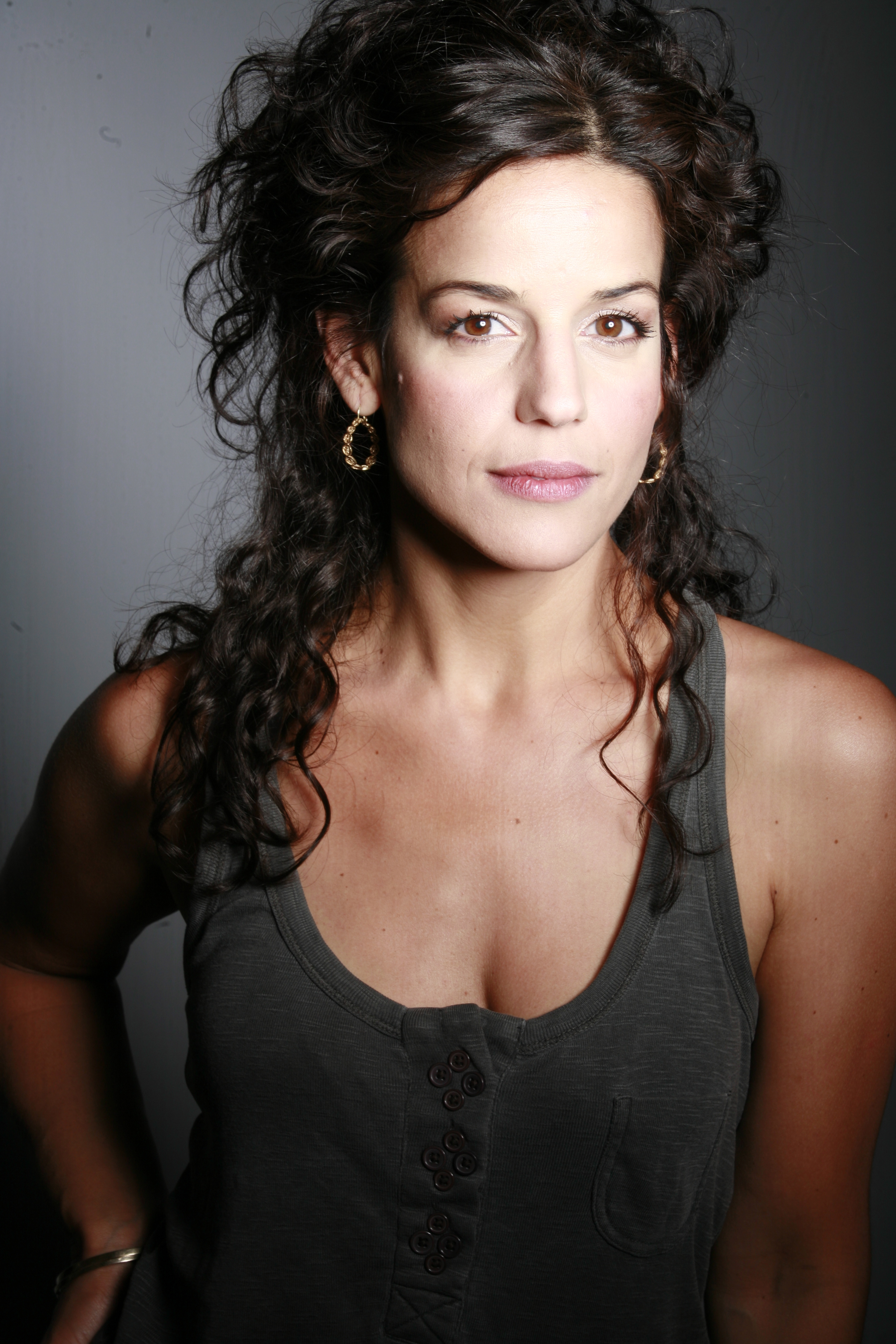
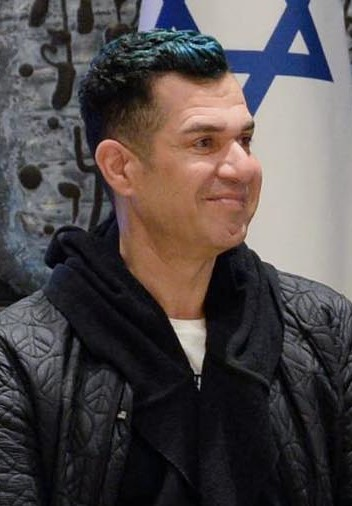
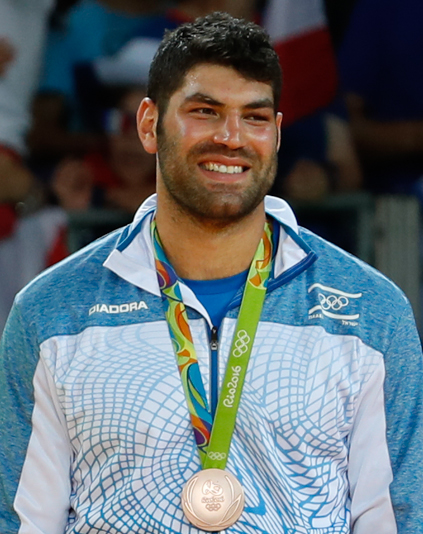
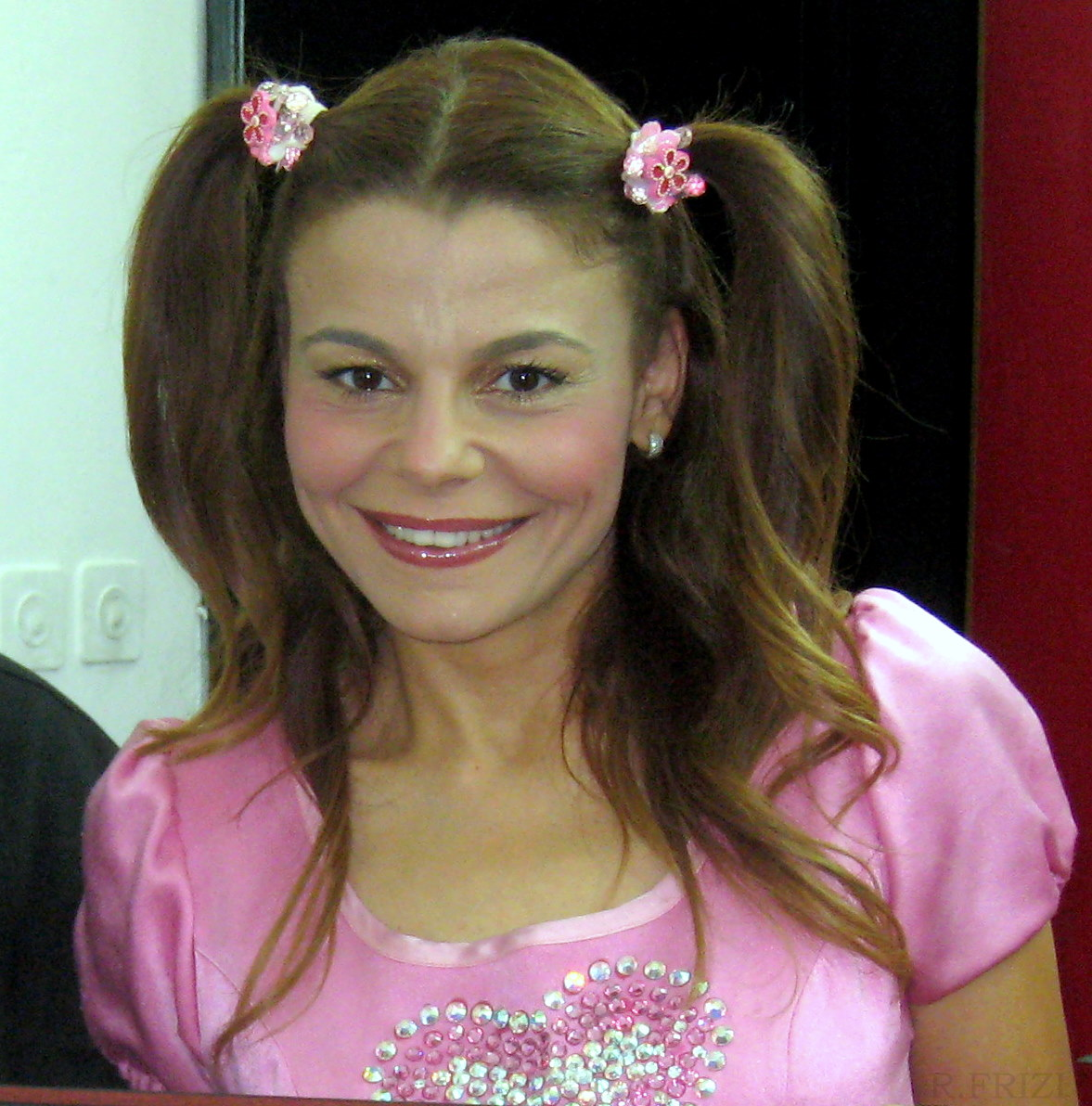
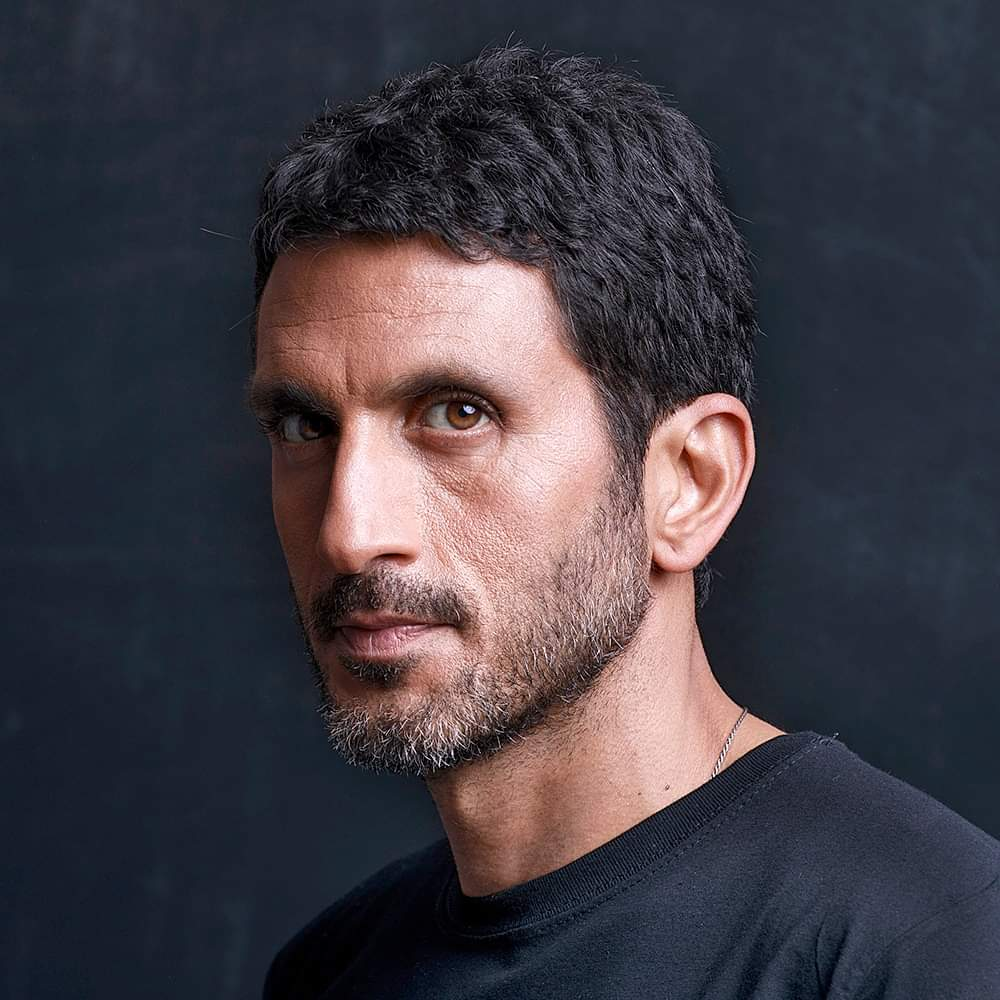
The celebrities who competed in the first season of The Singer in the Mask, pictured in order of elimination (l-r):
Tal Friedman ("Krembo"), Yinon Magal ("Cactus"), Gadi Sukenik ("Bear"), Dvir Benedek ("Shark"), Izhar Cohen ("Bull"), Michal Amdursky ("Mushroom"), Orna Datz ("Popcorn"), Einat Sarouf ("Pickle"), Lucy Aharish ("Stork"), Galit Giat ("Capra"), Itzik Cohen ("Dragon"), Or Sasson ("Falafel"), Rinat Gabay ("Dragonfly"), Tzachi Halevy ("Rooster").

== Episodes ==
=== Week 1 (September 23) ===
Performances on the first episode
#	Stage name	Song	Identity	Result
1	Rooster	"Let Me Entertain You" by Robbie Williams	undisclosed	SAFE
2	Dragon	"Creep" by Radiohead	undisclosed	SAFE
3	Bull	"Stay With Me" by Sam Smith	undisclosed	SAFE
4	Goat	"מיליון דולר” by Noa Kirel feat. Shahar Saul	undisclosed	SAFE
5	Pickle	"Mr. Lonely" by Bobby Vinton	undisclosed	SAFE
6	Bear	"I'm Too Sexy" by Right Said Fred	undisclosed	SAFE
7	Krembo	"All of Me" by John Legend	Tal Friedman	OUT

=== Week 2 (September 29) ===
Performances on the second episode
#	Stage name	Song	Identity	Result
1	Dragonfly	"Symphony" by Clean Bandit feat. Zara Larsson	undisclosed	SAFE
2	Cactus	“שמתי אבקה” by Eviatar Banai	Inon Magal	OUT
3	Shark	“טמפרטורה” by Omer Adam feat. Richie Loop	undisclosed	SAFE
4	Mushroom	"Hallelujah" by Alicia Keys	undisclosed	SAFE
5	Falafel	"שממה" by Uri Ben-Ari	undisclosed	SAFE
6	Stork	"חזור הביתה" by Ishay Ribo	undisclosed	SAFE
7	Popcorn	"Fuego" by Eleni Foureira	undisclosed	SAFE

=== Week 3 (October 1) ===
Performances on the third episode
#	Stage name	Song	Identity	Result
1	Goat	"I'm Every Woman" by Chaka Khan	undisclosed	RISK
2	Rooster	"צליל מחרוזת" by Eyal Golan	undisclosed	WIN
3	Bull	"ב. מ. וו שחור" by Ethnix	undisclosed	RISK
4	Dragon	"Circle of Life" by Elton John	undisclosed	WIN
5	Bear	"Piano Man" by Billy Joel	Gadi Sukenik	OUT
6	Pickle	"Havana" by Camila Cabello ft. Young Thug	undisclosed	WIN

=== Week 4/5 (October 4/5) ===
Performances on the fourth and fifth episode
Ep.	#	Stage name	Song	Identity	Result
4	1	Falafel	"מסע" by Eliad Nachum	undisclosed	RISK
4	2	Dragonfly	"Toxic" by Britney Spears	undisclosed	WIN
4	3	Shark	"Can't Stop the Feeling" by Justin Timberlake	Dvir Benedek	OUT
4	4	Stork	"שיר ללא שם" by Shalom Hanoch	undisclosed	WIN
5	5	Mushroom	"Ready to Go" by Republica	undisclosed	WIN
5	6	Popcorn	"Stay" by Rihanna feat. Mikky Ekko	undisclosed	RISK

=== Week 6/7 (October 12/13) ===
Performances on the sixth and seventh episode
Ep.	#	Stage name	Song	Identity	Result
6	1	Goat	"Nothing Compares 2 U" by Sinéad O'Connor	undisclosed	SAFE
6	2	Pickle	"All About That Bass" by Meghan Trainor	undisclosed	SAFE
6	3	Dragon	"ויקיפדיה" by Hanan Ben Ari	undisclosed	SAFE
7	4	Bull	"Stitches" by Shawn Mendes	Izhar Cohen	OUT
7	5	Rooster	"Halo" by Beyoncé	undisclosed	SAFE

=== Week 8/9 (October 18/19) ===
Performances on the eighth and ninth episode
Ep.	#	Stage name	Song	Identity	Result
8	1	Dragonfly	"That I Would Be Good" by Alanis Morissette	undisclosed	SAFE
8	2	Stork	"I Want to Break Free" by Queen	undisclosed	SAFE
8	3	Falafel	"Cold Little Heart" by Michael Kiwanuka	undisclosed	SAFE
9	4	Popcorn	"זוט אני" by Ella-Lee Lahav	undisclosed	SAFE
9	5	Mushroom	"Shallow" by Lady Gaga and Bradley Cooper	Michal Amdursky	OUT

=== Week 10 (October 26) ===
Performances on the tenth episode
#	Stage name	Song	Identity	Result
1	Pickle	"Good as Hell" by Lizzo	undisclosed	RISK
2	Rooster	"Disco Here Again" by The Spurs	undisclosed	RISK
3	Dragonfly	"חינם" by Sarit Hadad	undisclosed	SAFE
4	Falafel	"הכי קרוב אליך" by Eli Butner feat. Aviv Alush	undisclosed	SAFE
5	Popcorn	"Nothing Breaks Like a Heart" by Mark Ronson feat. Miley Cyrus	undisclosed	RISK
6	Goat	"Love Boy" by Dana International	undisclosed	RISK
7	Stork	"אבסורד" by Shlomo Artzi	undisclosed	RISK
8	Dragon	"אולי על חוף הים" by Yehoram Gaon	undisclosed	RISK

=== Week 11/12 (November 1/2) ===
Performances on the eleventh/twelfth episode
Ep.	#	Stage name	Song	Identity	Result
11	1	Goat	"No Roots" by Alice Merton	undisclosed	SAFE
11	2	Dragon	"(Simply) The Best" by Tina Turner feat. Jimmy Barnes	undisclosed	SAFE
11	3	Stork	"Runnin' (Lose It All)" by Naughty Boy feat. Beyoncé and Arrow Benjamin	undisclosed	SAFE
11	4	Popcorn	"Like a Prayer" by Madonna	Orna Datz	OUT
12	5	Rooster	"Greased Lightning" by John Travolta	undisclosed	SAFE
12	6	Pickle	"The End of the World" by Skeeter Davis	undisclosed	SAFE

=== Week 13/14 (November 8/9) ===
Performances on the thirteenth/fourteenth episode
Ep.	#	Stage name	Song	Identity	Result
13	1	Goat	"ריקוד" by Anya Buxtein and Offer Nissim	undisclosed	SAFE
13	2	Dragon	"I Don't Want to Miss a Thing" by Aerosmith	undisclosed	SAFE
13	3	Falafel	"אחרי כל השנים האלה" by Omer Adam	undisclosed	SAFE
13	4	Pickle	"Sweet Dreams (Are Made of This)" by Eurythmics	Einat Sarouf	OUT
14	5	Rooster	"Wrecking Ball" by Miley Cyrus	undisclosed	SAFE
14	6	Dragonfly	"Stand by Me" by Ben E. King	undisclosed	SAFE
14	7	Stork	"I Wanna Dance with Somebody (Who Loves Me)" by Whitney Houston	undisclosed	SAFE

=== Week 15/16 (November 15/16) ===
Performances on the fifteenth/sixteenth episode
Ep.	#	Stage name	Song	Identity	Result
15	1	Stork	"תל אביב בלילה" by Eden Ben Zaken	Lucy Aharish	OUT
15	2	Falafel	"Human" by Rag'n'Bone Man	undisclosed	SAFE
15	3	Goat	"ללמוד ללכת" by Nasrin Kadri	undisclosed	SAFE
15	4	Rooster	"הכל לטובה" by Static & Ben El Tavori	undisclosed	SAFE
16	5	Dragon	"Bad Romance" by Lady Gaga	undisclosed	SAFE
16	6	Dragonfly	"Don't Start Now" by Dua Lipa	undisclosed	SAFE

=== Week 17/18 (November 21/22) ===
Performances on the seventeenth/eighteenth episode
Ep.	#	Stage name	Song	Identity	Result
17	1	Dragon	"It's My Life" by Bon Jovi	undisclosed	SAFE
17	2	Rooster	"Impossible" by Shontelle	undisclosed	SAFE
17	3	Falafel	"אור גדול" by Amir Dadon	undisclosed	SAFE
18	4	Dragonfly	"Firework" by Katy Perry	undisclosed	SAFE
18	5	Goat	"עכשיו אתה חוזר" by Miri Mesika	Galit Giat	OUT

=== Week 19 - Semifinal (November 28) ===
Performances on the nineteenth episode
#	Stage name	Song	Identity	Result
1	Dragon	"The Show Must Go On" by Queen	Itzik Cohen	OUT
2	Falafel	"I'd Do Anything for Love (But I Won't Do That)" by Meat Loaf	undisclosed	SAFE
3	Dragonfly	"Euphoria" by Loreen	undisclosed	SAFE
4	Rooster	"כולם רוקדים עכשיו" by Hi-Five	undisclosed	SAFE

=== Week 20 - Final (December 5) ===
Performances on the final episode
#	Stage name	Song	Identity	Result
Round One
1	Rooster	"Don't Stop Me Now" by Queen	undisclosed	SAFE
2	Dragonfly	"Where Have You Been" by Rihanna	undisclosed	SAFE
3	Falafel	"7 Years" by Lukas Graham	Or Sasson	THIRD
Round Two
1	Dragonfly	"All by Myself" by Eric Carmen	Rinat Gabay	RUNNER-UP
2	Rooster	"Alive" by Sia	Tzachi Halevy	WINNER
