= The Singer in the Mask season 2 =

The Singer in the Mask
- Season 2
- Starring: Ofira Asayag; Shahar Hason; Tzedi Tzarfati; Static & Ben El Tavori
- Hosted by: Ido Rosenblum
- Winner: Shay Gabso as "Gorilla"
- Runner-up: Oz Zehavi as "Spaghetti"
- No. of episodes: 20

Release
- Original network: Channel 12
- Original release: 16 October – 18 December 2021

Season chronology
- ← Previous; Season 1 Next → Season 3

The second season of the Israeli version of The Singer in the Mask premiered on Channel 12 on 16 October 2021 and concluded on 18 December 2021. The series was won by actor and singer Shay Gabso as "Gorilla" with actor Oz Zehavi finishing second as "Spaghetti" and singer and voice actress Rotem Shefy finishing third as "Oats".

== Panelists and host ==
Season 2 panelists and host

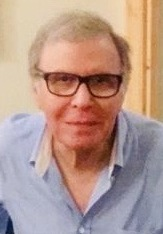
Tzedi Tzarfati

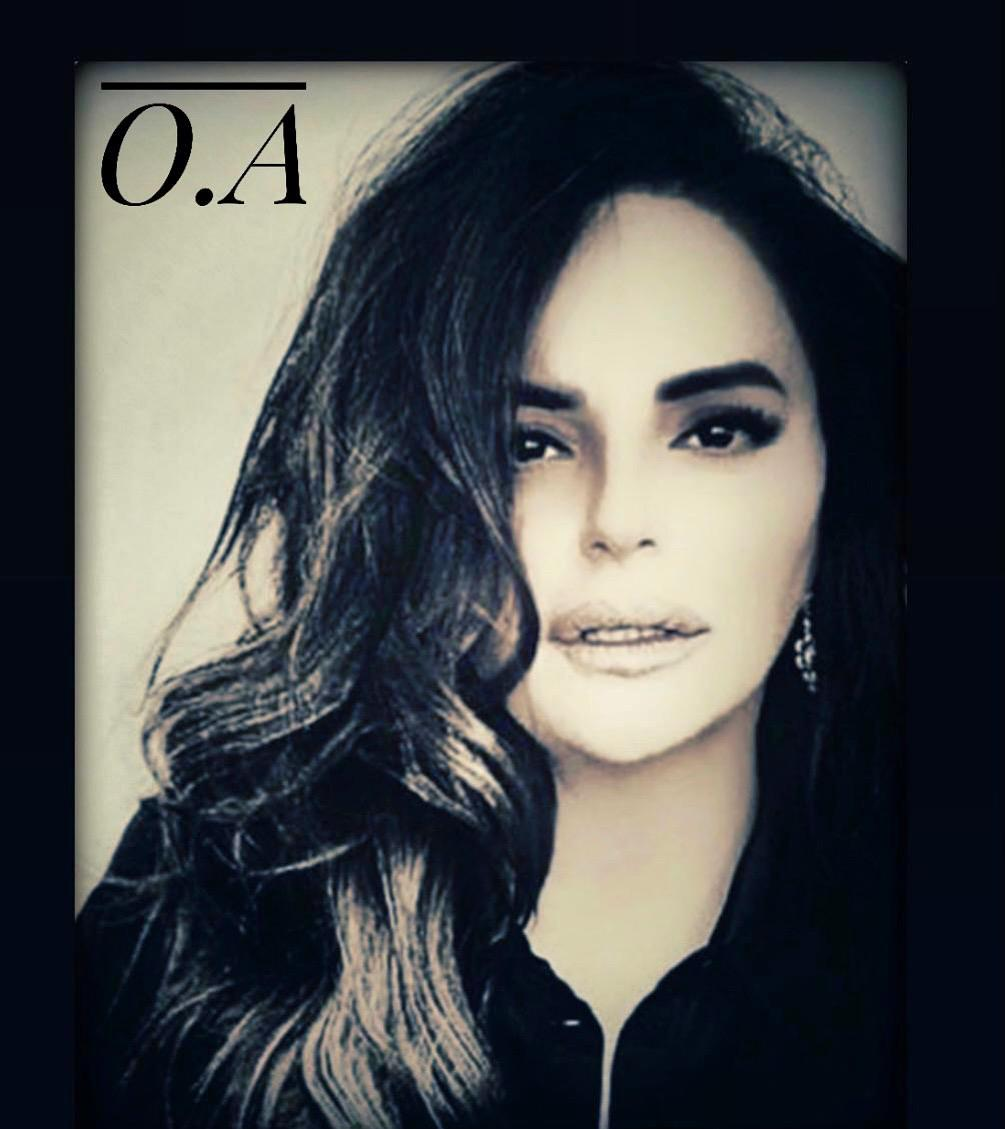
Ofira Asayag

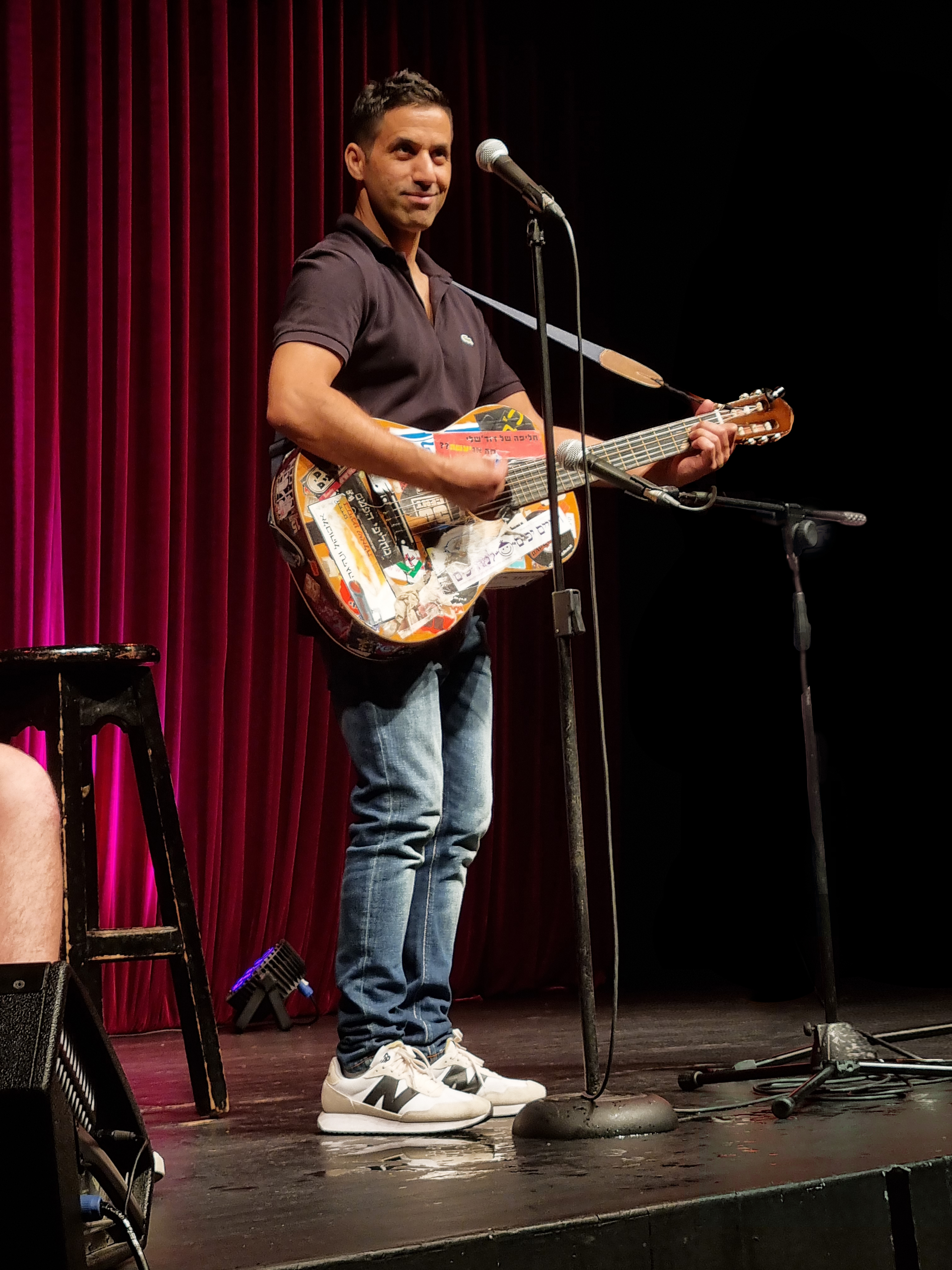
Shahar Hason

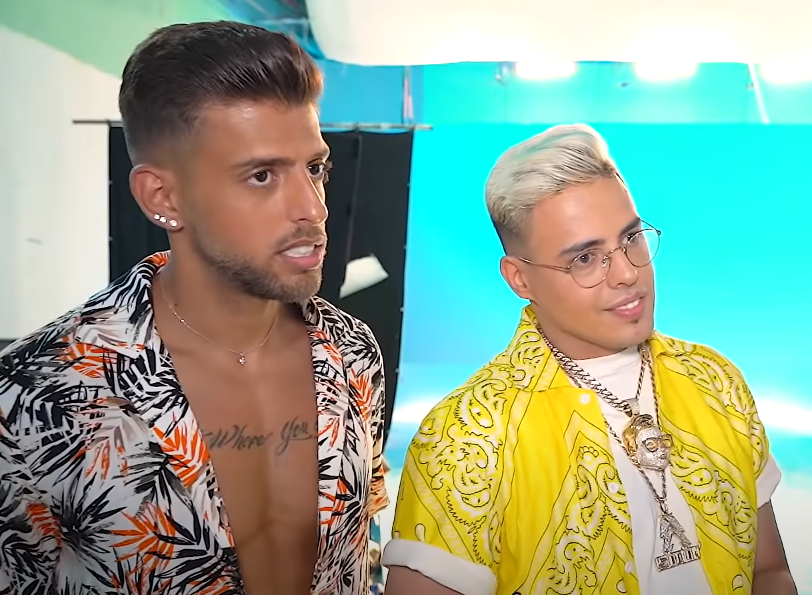
Static & Ben El Tavori

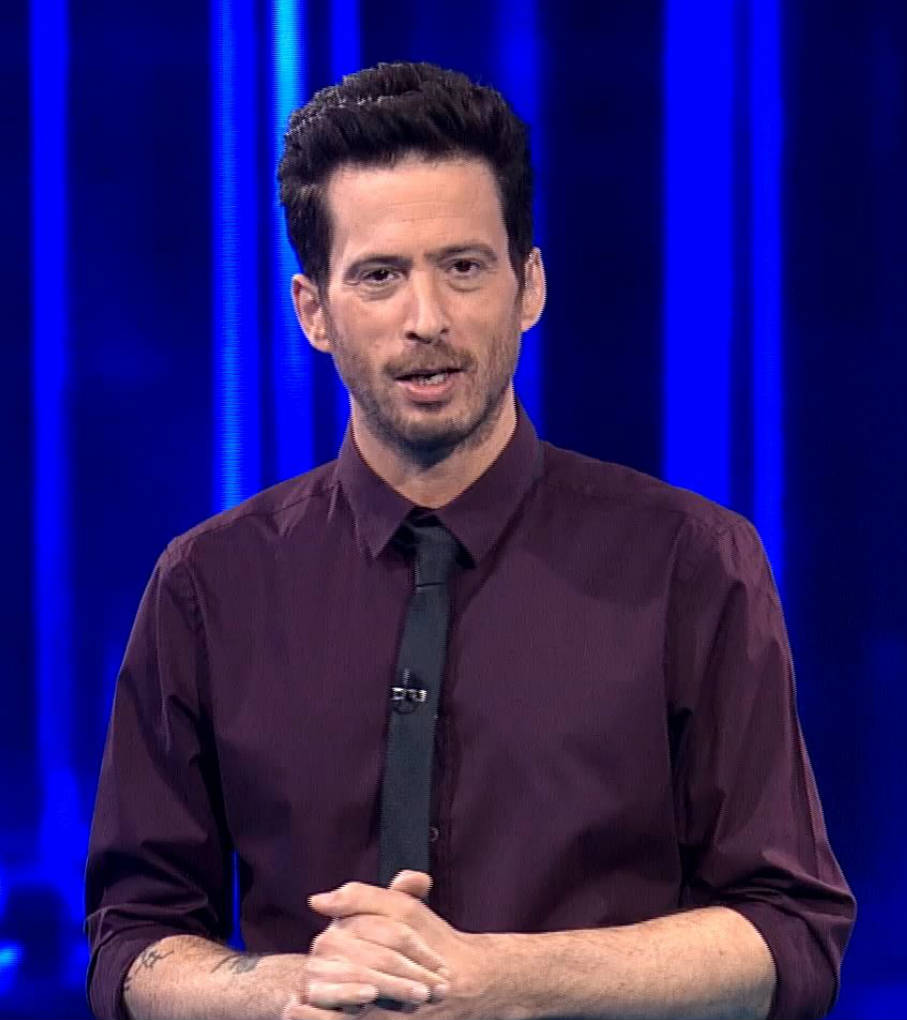
Ido Rosenblum

The show is hosted by television presenter Ido Rosenblum, with the judging panel consisting of journalist Ofira Asayag, the comedian Shahar Hason, musical duo Static & Ben El Tavori, and director Tzedi Tzarfati.

=== Guest panelists ===
Throughout the second season, various guest judges appeared alongside the original, for one episode.

These guest panelists have included:

| Episode | Name | Notability |
|---|---|---|
| 10 | Rita | Singer and Actress |
| 11 | Lior Suchard | Mentalist |
| 12 | Rina Matzliach | Radio personality and Journalist |
| 15 | Yisrael Aharoni | Chef |
| 16 | Carine Goren | Pastry chef |
| 17 | Niv Raskin | Television Personality and Journalist |
| 18 | Itay Levi | Singer |
| 19 | Israel Katorza | Comedian |
| 20 | Tzachi Halevy | Actor, Singer and first season winner |

== Contestants ==
| Stage Name | Celebrity | Occupation | Episodes | | | | | | | | | | | | | | | | | | | |
| Stage Name | Celebrity | Occupation | 1 | 2 | 3 | 4 | 5 | 6 | 7 | 8 | 9 | 10 | 11 | 12 | 13/14 | 15 | 16 | 17 | 18 | 19 | 20 | |
| Stage Name | Celebrity | Occupation | Group A | | | Group B | | | Group C | | | A | B | C | 13/14 | 15 | 16 | 17 | 18 | 19 | A | B |
|---|---|---|---|---|---|---|---|---|---|---|---|---|---|---|---|---|---|---|---|---|---|---|
| Gorilla | Shay Gabso | Singer | | | | SAFE | WIN | SAFE | | | | | SAFE | | SAFE | SAFE | | | SAFE | SAFE | SAFE | WINNER |
| Spaghetti | Oz Zehavi | Actor | | | | | | | SAFE | WIN | SAFE | | | SAFE | SAFE | | SAFE | SAFE | | SAFE | SAFE | RUNNER-UP |
| Oats | Rotem Shefy | Singer | SAFE | WIN | SAFE | | | | | | | SAFE | | | SAFE | | SAFE | SAFE | | SAFE | THIRD | |
| Schnauzer | Nadav Abuksis | Comedian | | | | | | | SAFE | RISK | SAFE | | | SAFE | SAFE | SAFE | | | SAFE | OUT | | |
| Oyster | Netta Garti | Actress | SAFE | RISK | SAFE | | | | | | | SAFE | | | SAFE | SAFE | | | OUT | | | |
| Chameleon | Maor Buzaglo | Footballer | | | | SAFE | RISK | SAFE | | | | | SAFE | | SAFE | | SAFE | OUT | | | | |
| Horse | Moshe Datz | Singer | | | | SAFE | RISK | SAFE | | | | | SAFE | | SAFE | | OUT | | | | | |
| Fox | Hanny Nahmias | Singer | | | | | | | SAFE | RISK | SAFE | | | SAFE | SAFE | OUT | | | | | | |
| Octopus | Haim Cohen | Chef | SAFE | WIN | SAFE | | | | | | | SAFE | | | OUT | | | | | | | |
| Beetle | Stav Shaffir | Politician | | | | | | | SAFE | WIN | SAFE | | | OUT | | | | | | | | |
| Babushka | Tahounia Rubel | Model | | | | SAFE | WIN | SAFE | | | | | OUT | | | | | | | | | |
| Rugelach | Moshik Afia | Singer | SAFE | WIN | SAFE | | | | | | | OUT | | | | | | | | | | |
| Chili | Kevin Rubin | Actor | | | | | | | SAFE | WIN | OUT | | | | | | | | | | | |
| Hedgehog | Nehemia Shtrasler | Journalist | | | | | | | SAFE | OUT | | | | | | | | | | | | |
| Strawberry | Sandra Sade | Actress | | | | SAFE | WIN | OUT | | | | | | | | | | | | | | |
| Pea | Itamar Grotto | Doctor | | | | SAFE | OUT | | | | | | | | | | | | | | | |
| Gazelle | Ron Shahar | Actor | SAFE | RISK | OUT | | | | | | | | | | | | | | | | | |
| Parrot | Shahar Pe'er | Tennis player | SAFE | OUT | | | | | | | | | | | | | | | | | | |

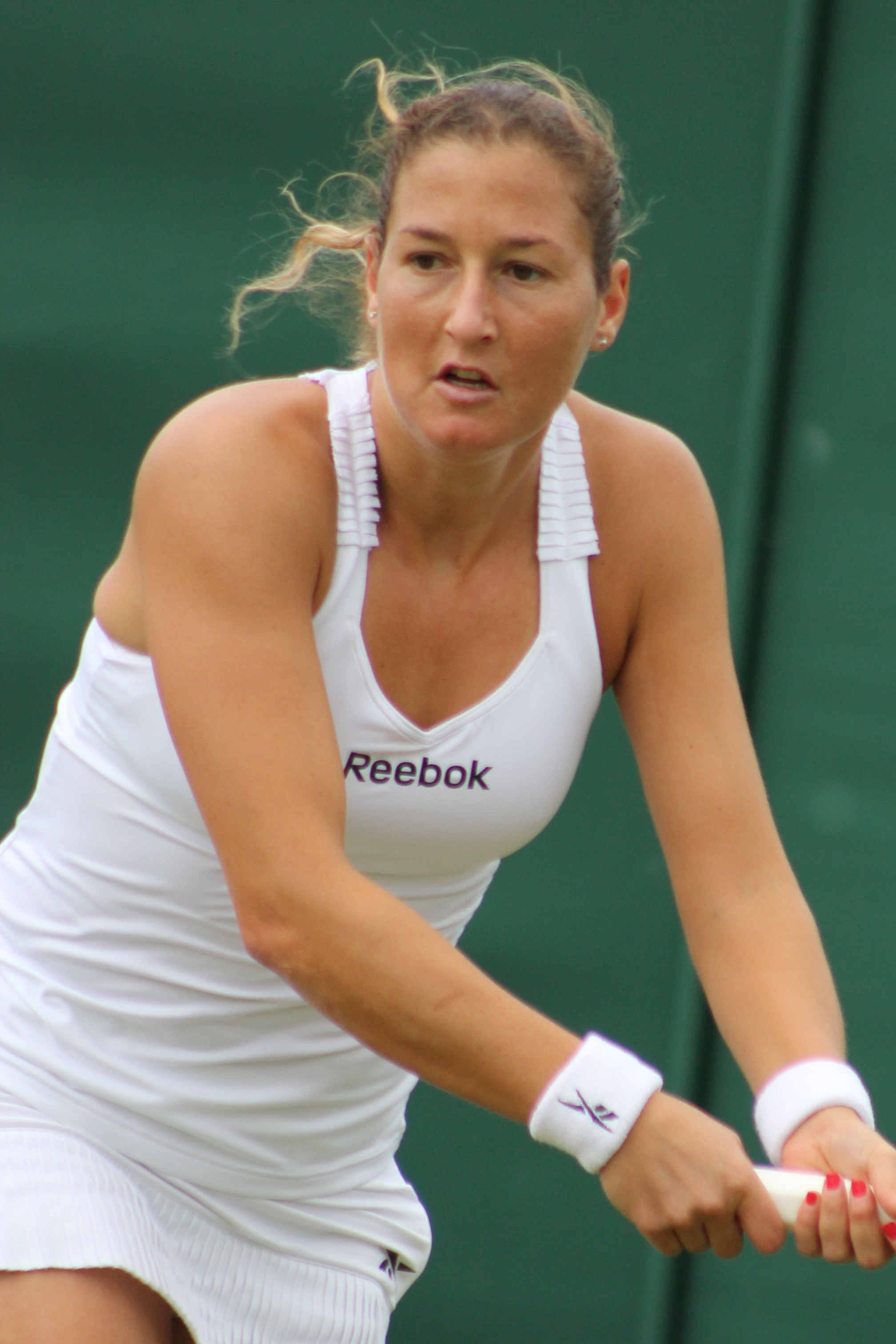
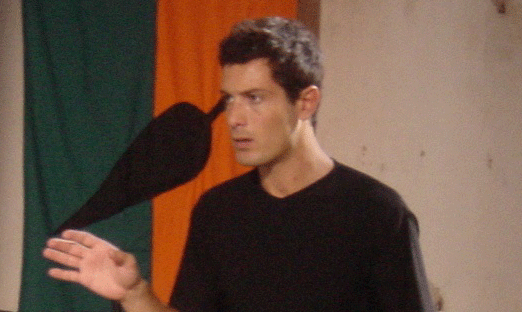
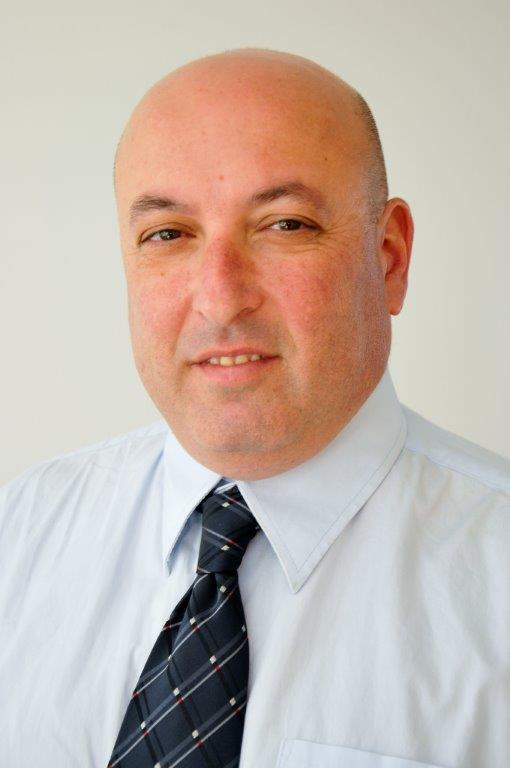
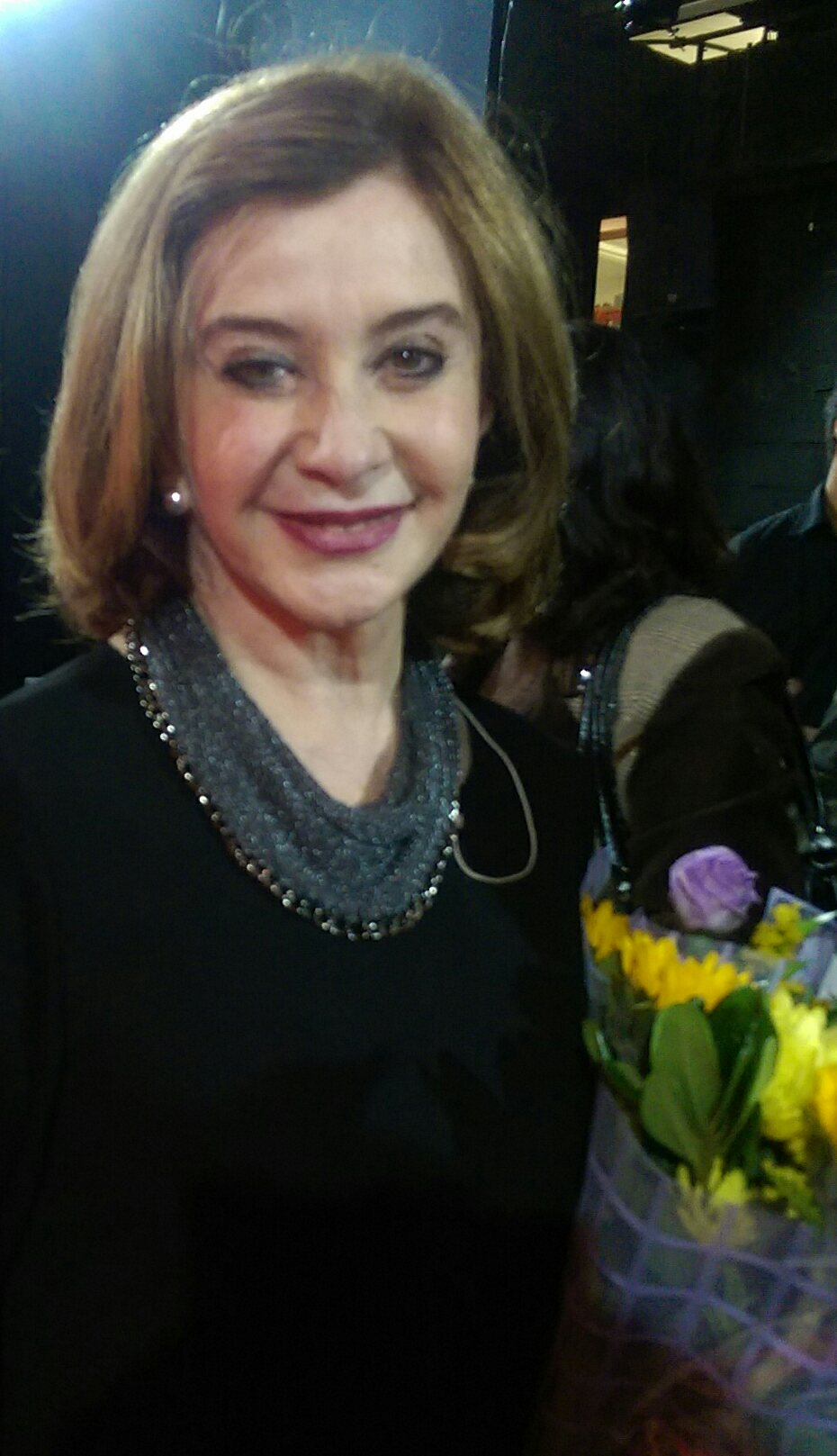
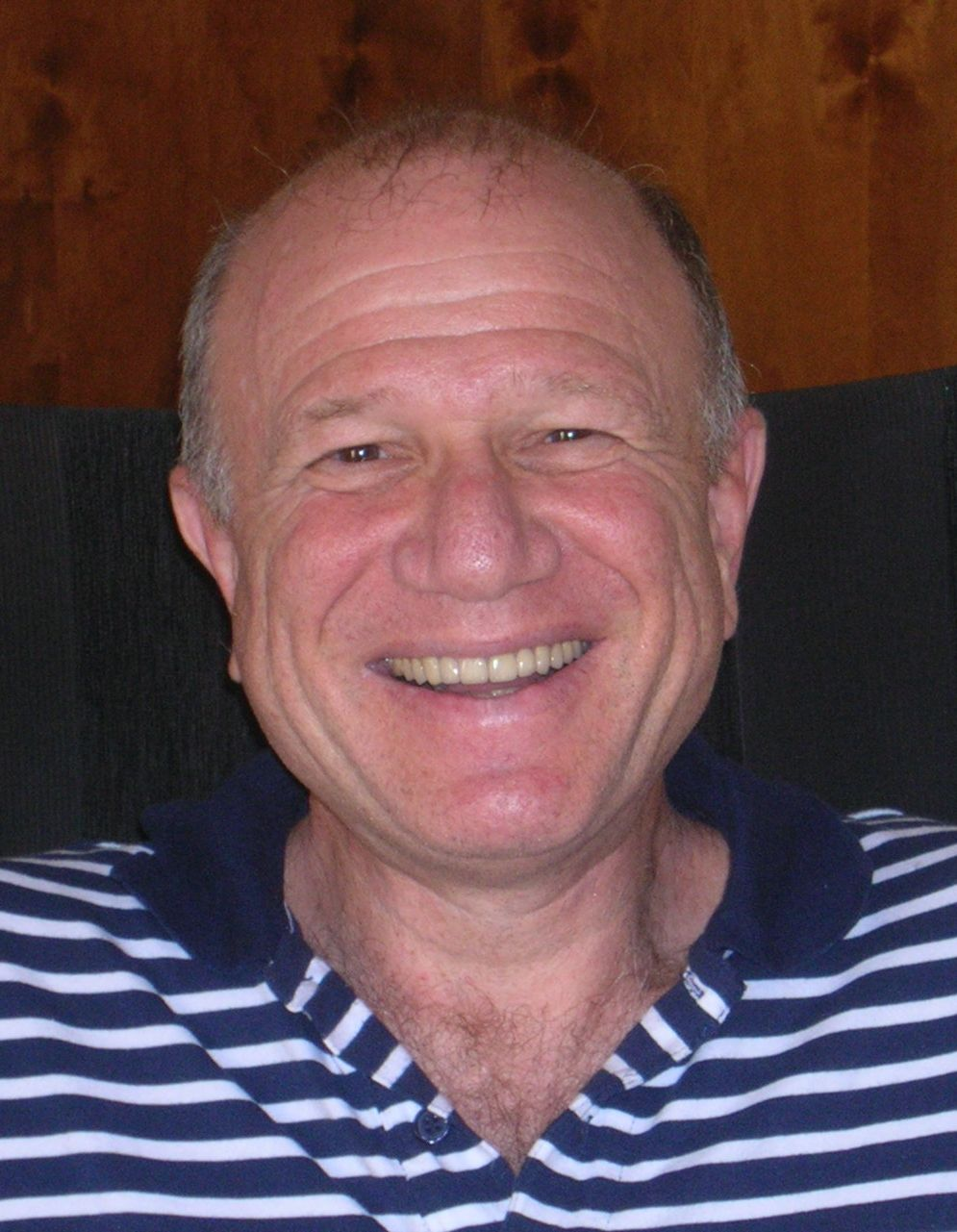
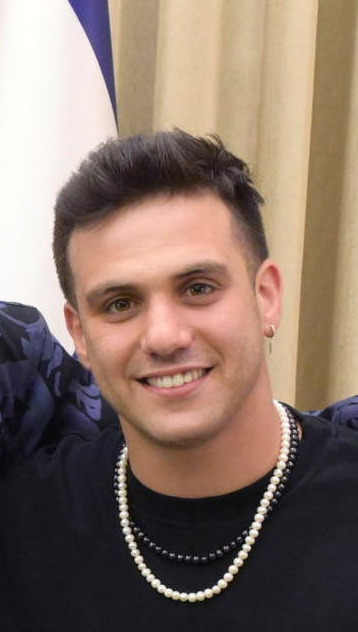
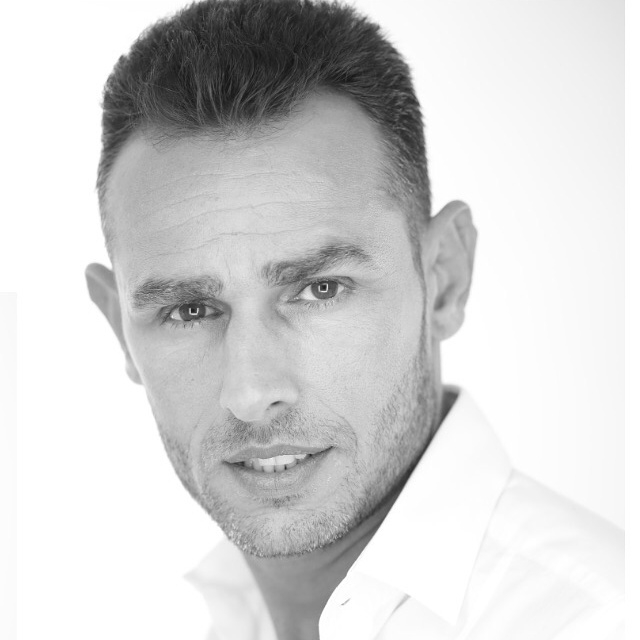
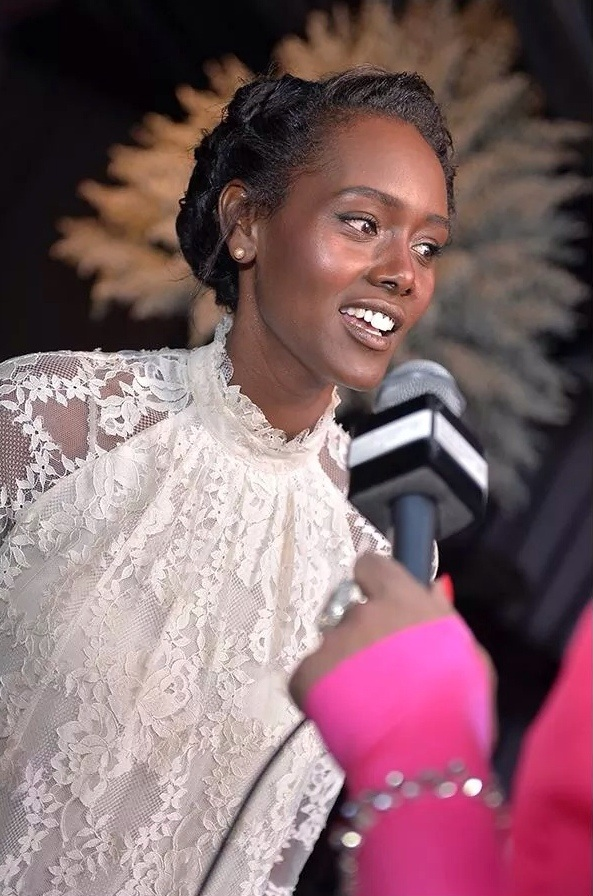
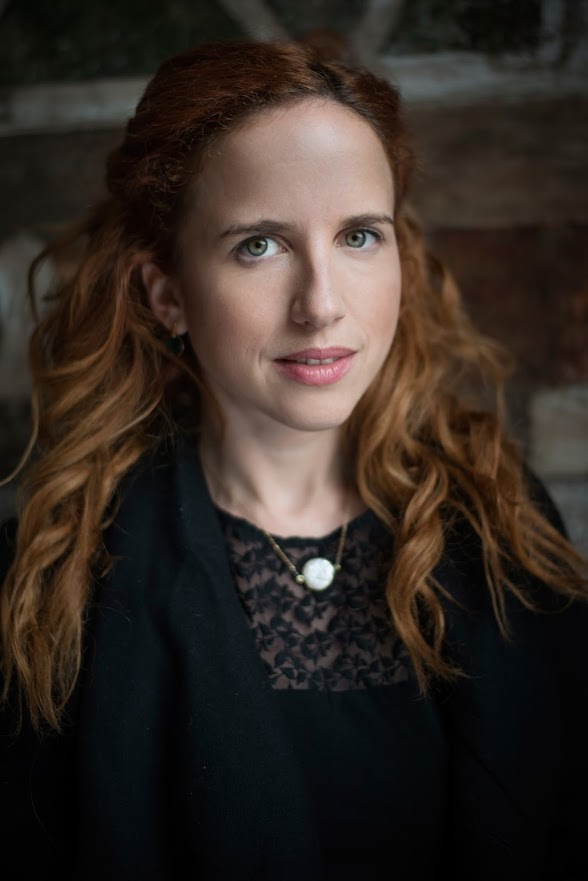
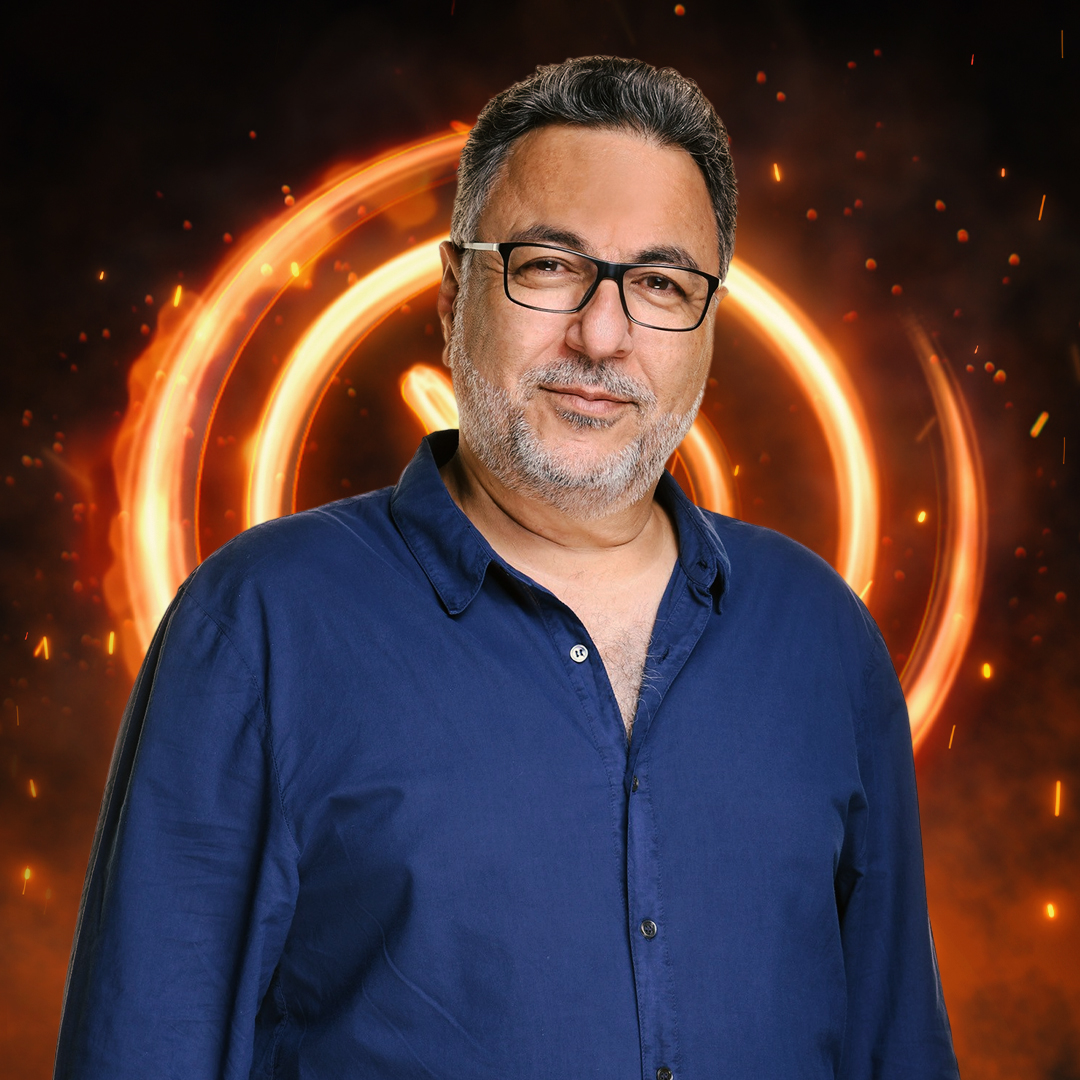
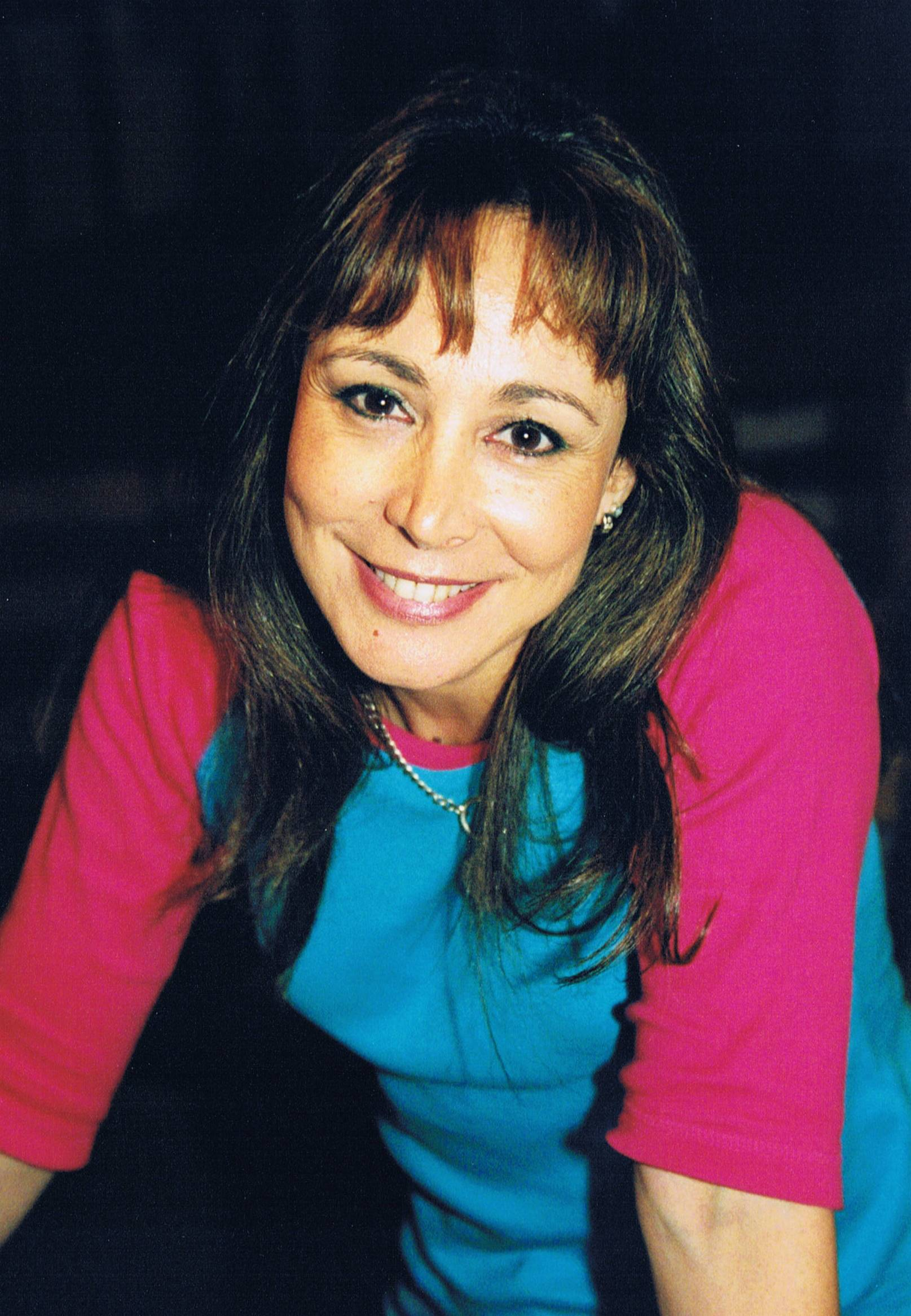
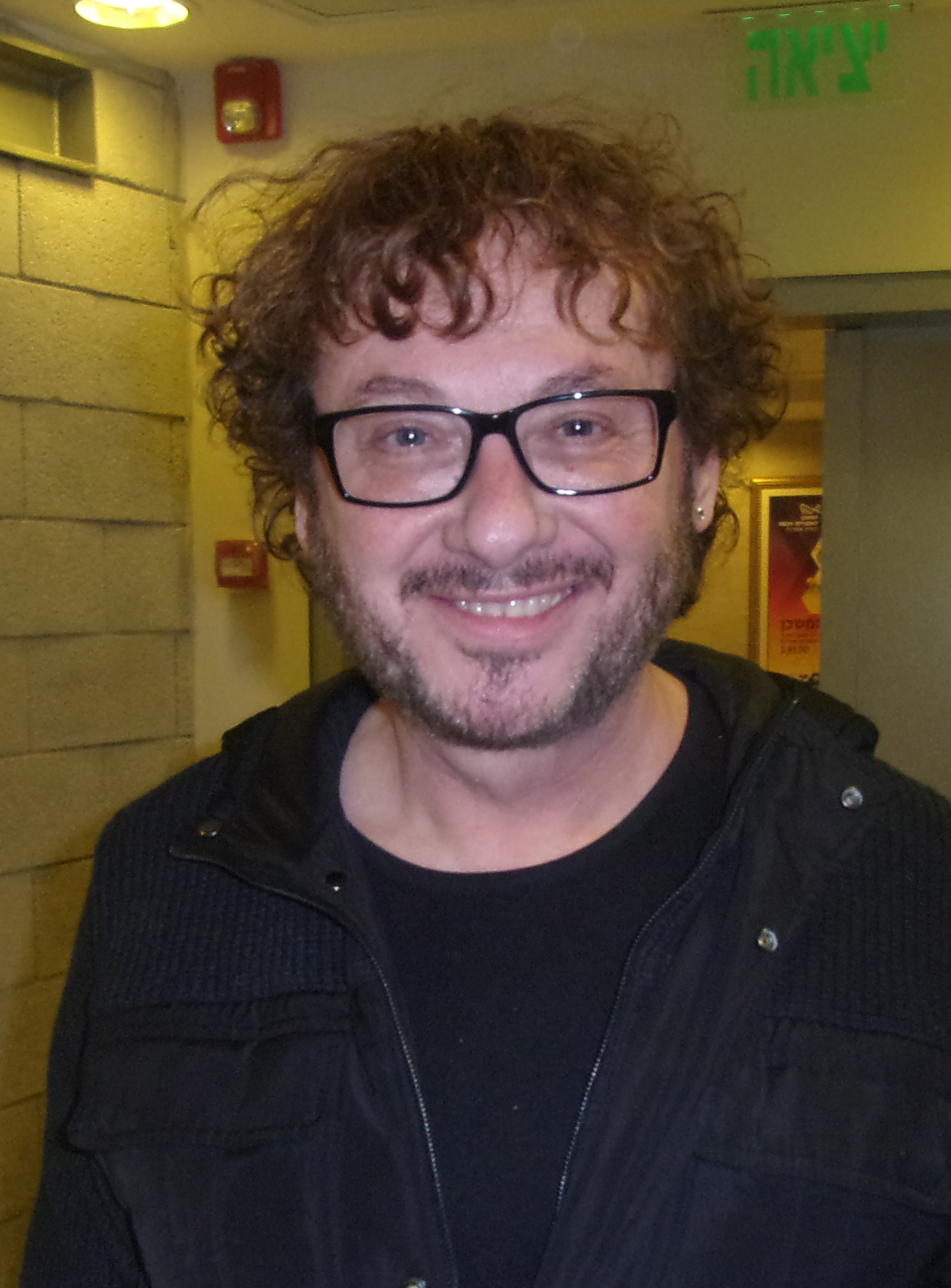
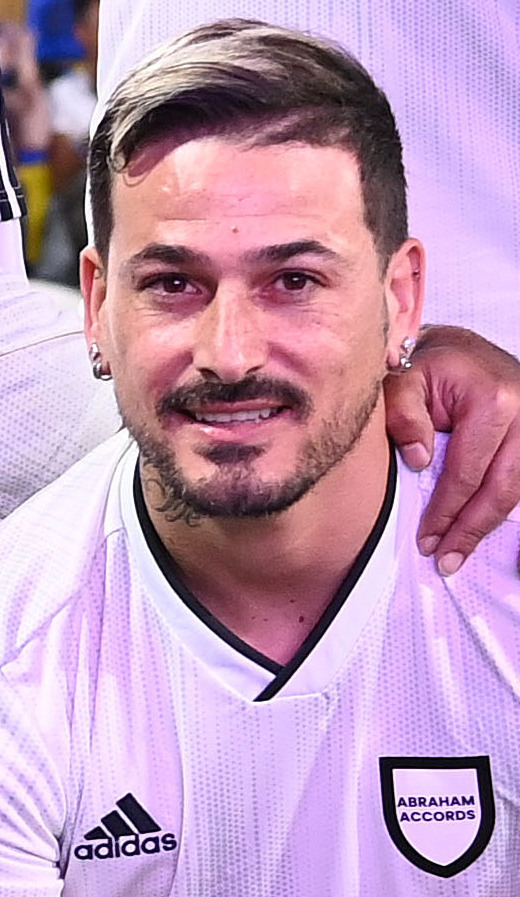
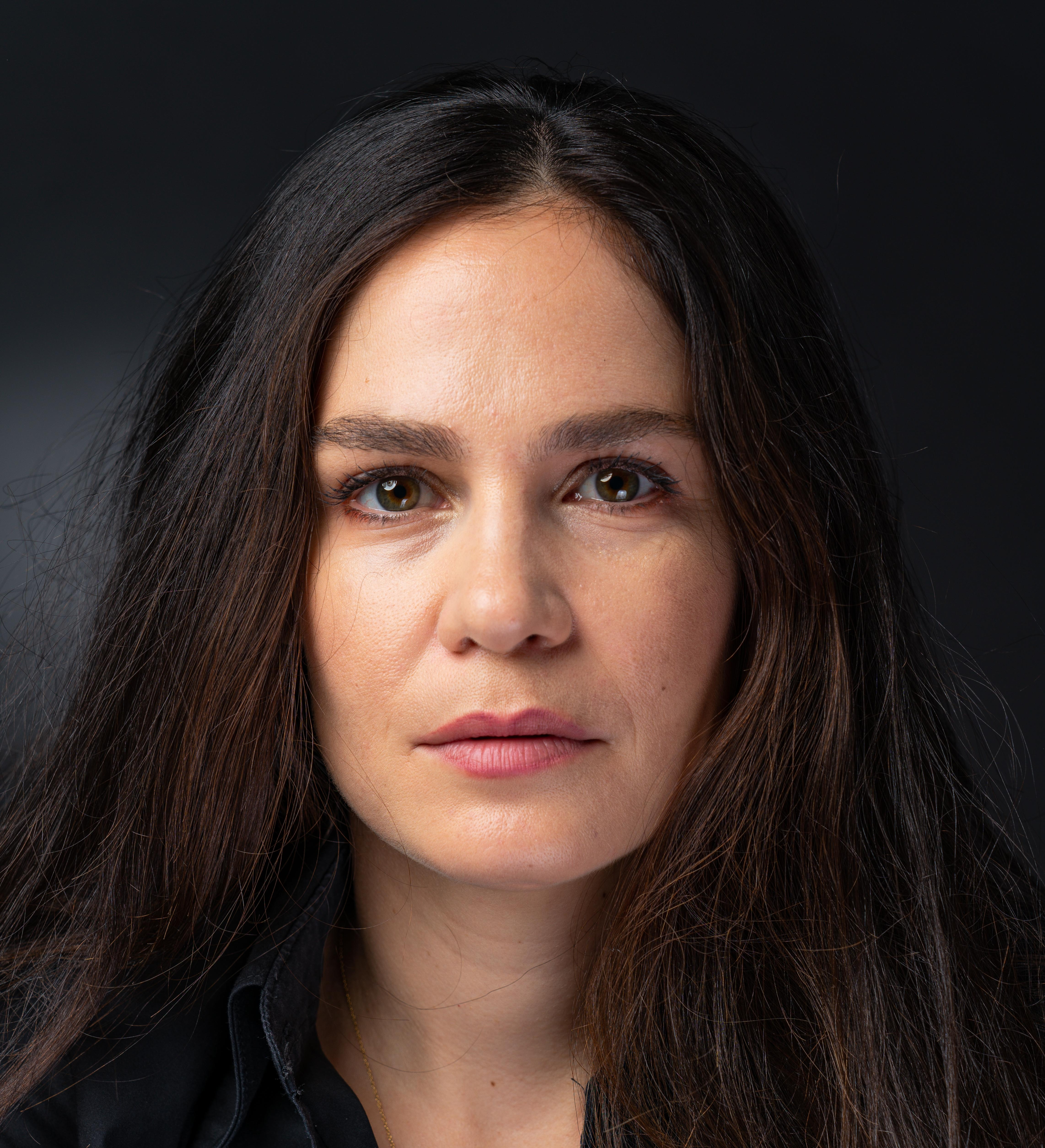
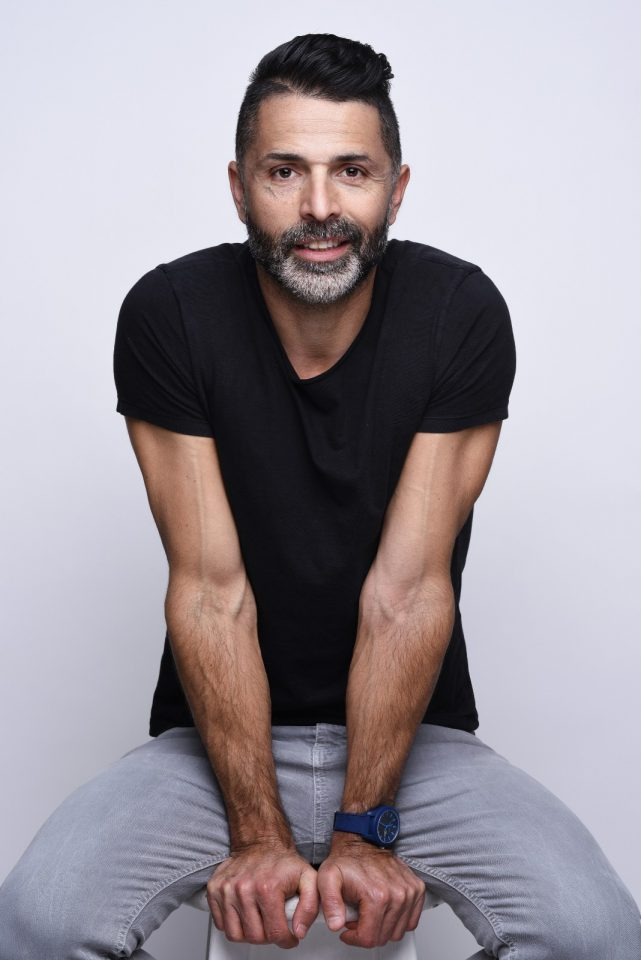
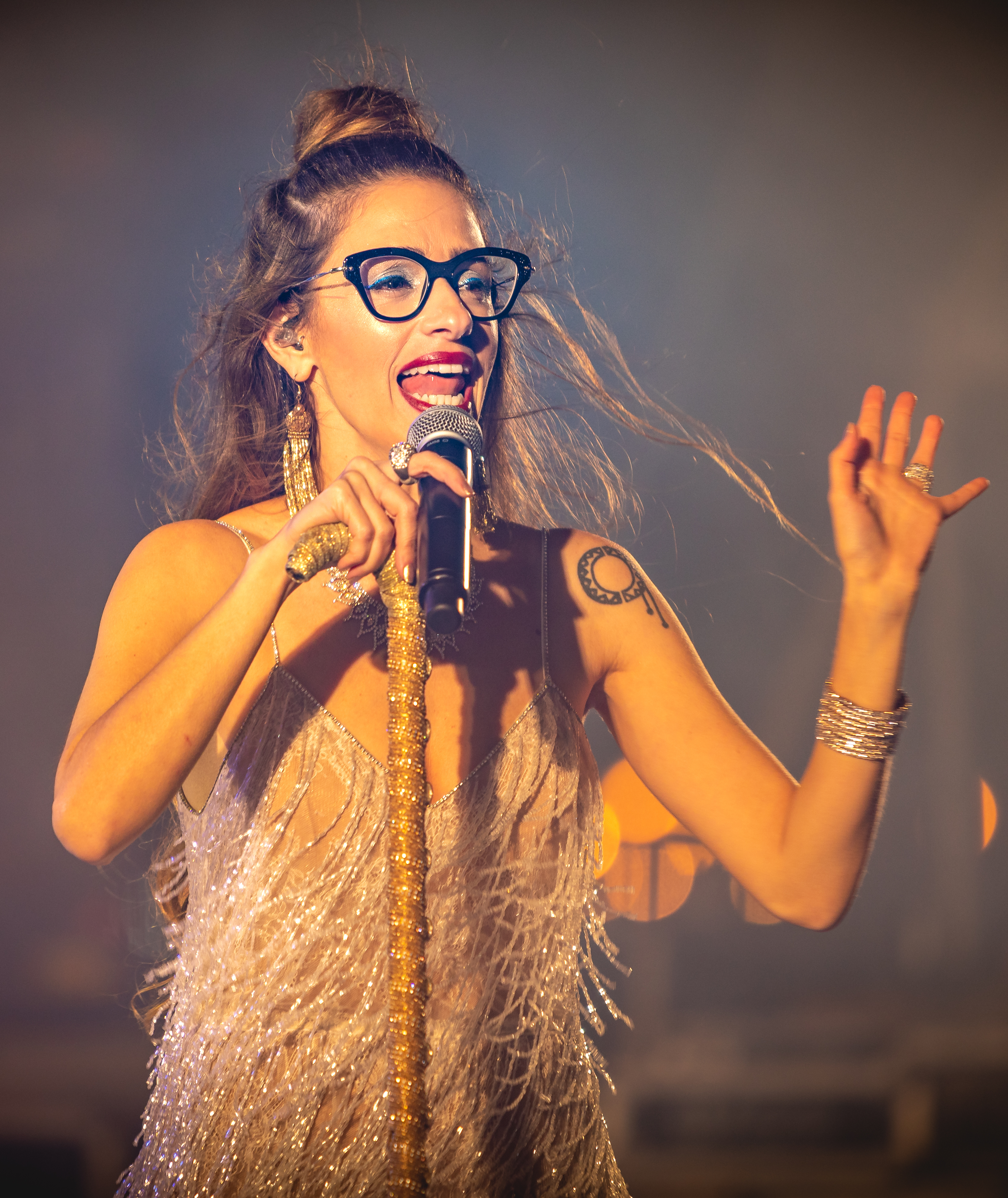
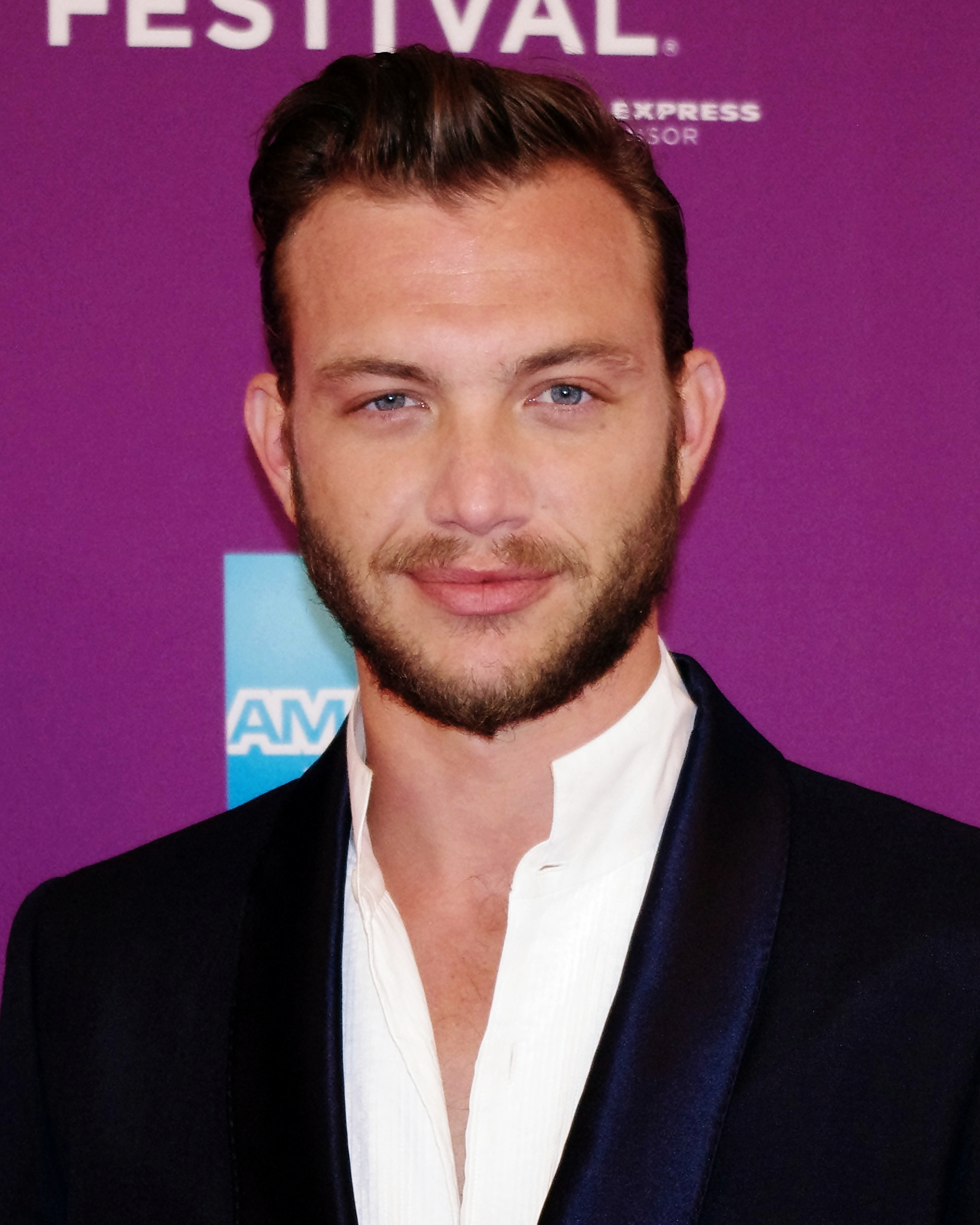
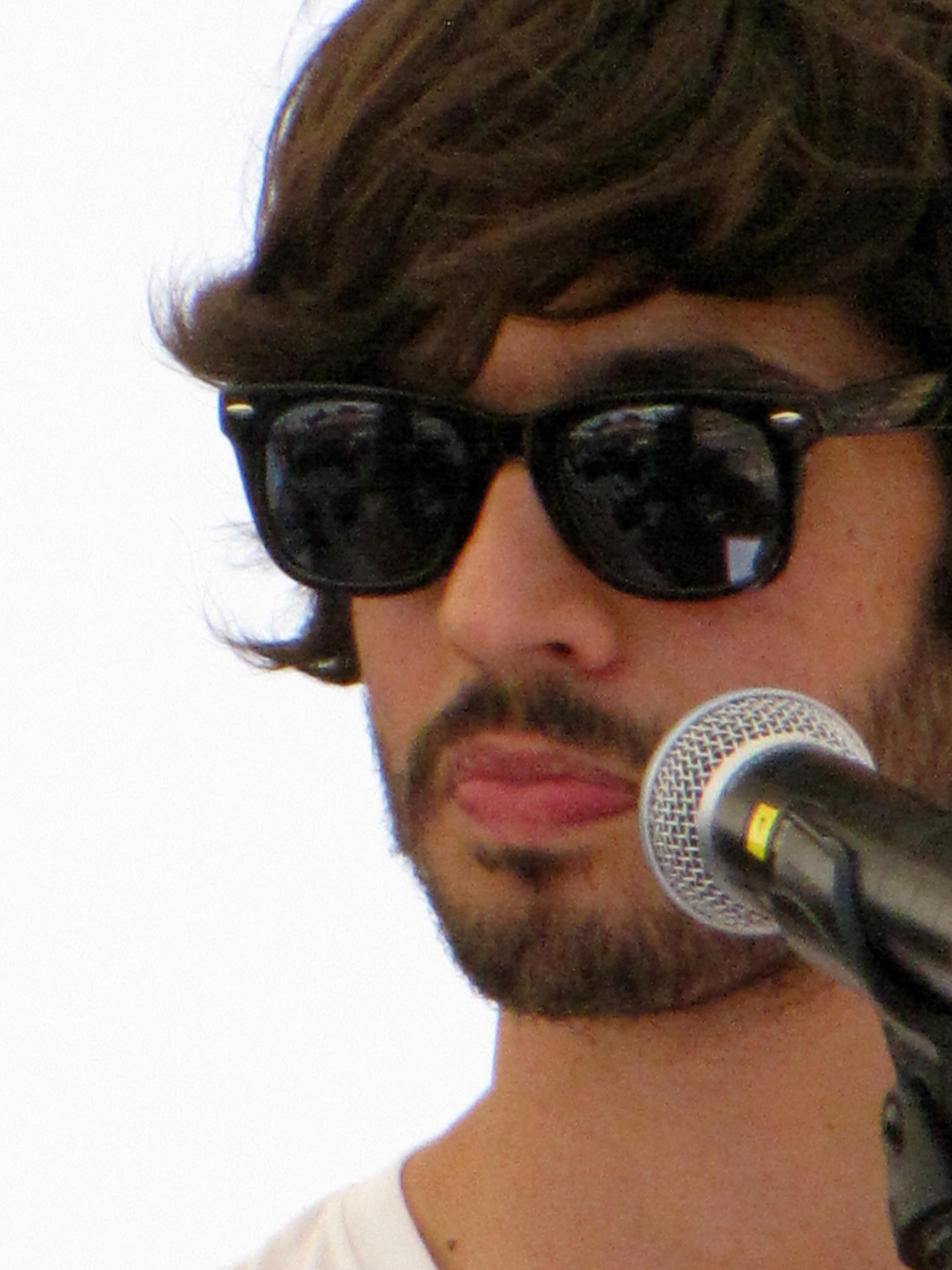
The celebrities who competed in the second season of The Singer in the Mask, pictured in order of elimination (l-r):
Shahar Pe'er ("Parrot"), Ron Shahar ("Gazelle"), Itamar Grotto ("Pea"), Sandra Sade ("Strawberry"), Nehemia Shtrasler ("Hedgehog"), Kevin Rubin ("Chilli"), Moshik Afia ("Rugelach"), Tahounia Rubel ("Babushka"), Stav Shaffir ("Ladybug”), Haim Cohen ("Octopus"), Hanny Nahmias ("Fox"), Moshe Datz ("Horse"), Maor Buzaglo ("Chameleon"), Netta Garti ("Oyster"), Nadav Abuksis ("Schnauzer"), Rotem Shefy ("Oats"), Oz Zehavi ("Spaghetti"), Shay Gabso ("Gorilla"),

== Episodes ==
=== Week 1 (October 16/17/18) (Note: The voting took place in episode 2 as the contestants have all performed. Additional voting for the other five masks of the group took place in episode 3 after all contestants have performed.) ===
Performances on the first episode
| # | Stage name | Song | Identity | Result |
|---|---|---|---|---|
| 1 | Oyster | "Break My Heart" by Dua Lipa | undisclosed | SAFE |
| 2 | Gazelle | "(You Make Me Feel Like) A Natural Woman" by Aretha Franklin | undisclosed | SAFE |
| 3 | Oats | "את תלכי בשדה" by Chava Alberstein | undisclosed | SAFE |
| 4 | Rugelach | "Wake Me Up Before You Go-Go" by Wham! | undisclosed | SAFE |
| 5 | Octopus | "One Day" by Matisyahu | undisclosed | SAFE |
| 6 | Parrot | "טיקיטאס" by Noa Kirel feat. Stéphane Legar | undisclosed | SAFE |

Performances on the second episode
| # | Stage name | Song | Identity | Result |
|---|---|---|---|---|
| 1 | Gazelle | "Freedom! '90" by George Michael | undisclosed | RISK |
| 2 | Octopus | "Ego" by Willy William | undisclosed | WIN |
| 3 | Rugelach | "Jailhouse Rock" by Elvis Presley | undisclosed | WIN |
| 4 | Oyster | "מסיבה" by Jasmin Moallem | undisclosed | RISK |
| 5 | Parrot | "I Follow Rivers" by Lykke Li | Shahar Pe'er | OUT |
| 6 | Oats | "Side to Side" by Ariana Grande feat. Nicki Minaj | undisclosed | WIN |

Performances on the third episode
| # | Stage name | Song | Identity | Result |
|---|---|---|---|---|
| 1 | Gazelle | "(I've Had) The Time of My Life" by Bill Medley and Jennifer Warnes | Ron Shahar | OUT |
| 2 | Oats | "I Have Nothing" by Whitney Houston | undisclosed | SAFE |
| 3 | Octopus | "Singin' in the Rain" by Gene Kelly | undisclosed | SAFE |
| 4 | Oyster | "California Dreamin'" by The Mamas & the Papas | undisclosed | SAFE |
| 5 | Rugelach | "Against All Odds" by Phil Collins | undisclosed | SAFE |

=== Week 2 (October 23/25/26) (Note: The voting took place in episode 5 as the contestants have all performed. Additional voting for the other five masks of the group took place in episode 6 after all contestants have performed.) ===
Performances on the fourth episode
| # | Stage name | Song | Identity | Result |
|---|---|---|---|---|
| 1 | Gorilla | "Whatever It Takes" by Imagine Dragons | undisclosed | SAFE |
| 2 | Chameleon | "Komsi komsa" by Stéphane Legar | undisclosed | SAFE |
| 3 | Strawberry | "Summertime Sadness" by Lana Del Rey | undisclosed | SAFE |
| 4 | Horse | "Despacito" by Luis Fonsi and Daddy Yankee | undisclosed | SAFE |
| 5 | Pea | "Bad Guy" by Billie Eilish | undisclosed | SAFE |
| 6 | Babushka | "Russian Roulette" by Rihanna | undisclosed | SAFE |

Performances on the fifth episode
| # | Stage name | Song | Identity | Result |
|---|---|---|---|---|
| 1 | Horse | "Uptown Funk" by Mark Ronson feat. Bruno Mars | undisclosed | RISK |
| 2 | Strawberry | "Rehab" by Amy Winehouse | undisclosed | WIN |
| 3 | Gorilla | "Blinding Lights" by The Weeknd | undisclosed | WIN |
| 4 | Chameleon | "Incomplete" by Backstreet Boys | undisclosed | RISK |
| 5 | Pea | "All Star" by Smash Mouth | Itamar Grotto | OUT |
| 6 | Babushka | "Just Give Me a Reason" by Pink | undisclosed | WIN |

Performances on the sixth episode
| # | Stage name | Song | Identity | Result |
|---|---|---|---|---|
| 1 | Babushka | "Heaven Is a Place on Earth" by Belinda Carlisle | undisclosed | SAFE |
| 2 | Chameleon | “סוֹד” by Adam | undisclosed | SAFE |
| 3 | Horse | "True Colors" by Cyndi Lauper | undisclosed | SAFE |
| 4 | Strawberry | "There Must Be an Angel" by Eurythmics | Sandra Sade | OUT |
| 5 | Gorilla | "Purple Rain" by Prince and The Revolution | undisclosed | SAFE |

=== Week 3 (October 31 & November 2/7) (Note: The voting took place in episode 8 as the contestants have all performed. Additional voting for the other five masks of the group took place in episode 9 after all contestants have performed.) ===
Performances on the seventh episode
| # | Stage name | Song | Identity | Result |
|---|---|---|---|---|
| 1 | Spaghetti | "Soldi" by Mahmood | undisclosed | SAFE |
| 2 | Beetle | "Let's Get Loud" by Jennifer Lopez | undisclosed | SAFE |
| 3 | Chili | "Dragostea Din Tei" by O-Zone | undisclosed | SAFE |
| 4 | Fox | "Wannabe" by Spice Girls | undisclosed | SAFE |
| 5 | Hedgehog | "Waiting for Love" by Avicii | undisclosed | SAFE |
| 6 | Schnauzer | "Skyfall" by Adele | undisclosed | SAFE |

Performances on the eighth episode
| # | Stage name | Song | Identity | Result |
|---|---|---|---|---|
| 1 | Schnauzer | "Papaoutai" by Stromae | undisclosed | RISK |
| 2 | Chili | "ג'וני" by Bar Tzabary | undisclosed | WIN |
| 3 | Fox | "Back to Black" by Amy Winehouse | undisclosed | RISK |
| 4 | Spaghetti | "Believer" by Imagine Dragons | undisclosed | WIN |
| 5 | Hedgehog | "Moves Like Jagger" by Maroon 5 feat. Christina Aguilera | Nehemia Shtrasler | OUT |
| 6 | Beetle | "Juice" by Lizzo | undisclosed | WIN |

Performances on the ninth episode
| # | Stage name | Song | Identity | Result |
|---|---|---|---|---|
| 1 | Spaghetti | "Can't Take My Eyes Off You" by Frankie Valli | undisclosed | SAFE |
| 2 | Fox | "Love Me like You Do" by Ellie Goulding | undisclosed | SAFE |
| 3 | Chili | "Someone You Loved" by Lewis Capaldi | Kevin Rubin | OUT |
| 4 | Schnauzer | "An Eisai Ena Asteri" by Nikos Vertis | undisclosed | SAFE |
| 5 | Beetle | "Crazy in Love" by Beyoncé feat. Jay-Z | undisclosed | SAFE |

=== Week 4 (November 8) ===
Performances on the tenth episode
| # | Stage name | Song | Identity | Result |
|---|---|---|---|---|
| 1 | Oats | "Bang Bang" by Jessie J, Ariana Grande & Nicki Minaj | undisclosed | SAFE |
| 2 | Rugelach | "Hero" by Enrique Iglesias | Moshik Afia | OUT |
| 3 | Octopus | "Happy" by Pharrell Williams | undisclosed | SAFE |
| 4 | Oyster | "Somewhere Only We Know" by Keane | undisclosed | SAFE |

=== Week 5 (November 14 & 16) ===
Performances on the eleventh episode
| # | Stage name | Song | Identity | Result |
|---|---|---|---|---|
| 1 | Gorilla | "Cake by the Ocean" by DNCE | undisclosed | SAFE |
| 2 | Babushka | "Vogue" by Madonna | Tahounia Rubel | OUT |
| 3 | Horse | "Bye Bye Bye" by NSYNC | undisclosed | SAFE |
| 4 | Chameleon | "בית משוגעים” by Ran Danker | undisclosed | SAFE |

Performances on the twelfth episode
| # | Stage name | Song | Identity | Result |
|---|---|---|---|---|
| 1 | Schnauzer | "Let Me Love You" by DJ Snake feat. Justin Bieber | undisclosed | SAFE |
| 2 | Beetle | "Real Love" by The Beatles | Stav Shaffir | OUT |
| 3 | Fox | "Survivor" by Destiny's Child | undisclosed | SAFE |
| 4 | Spaghetti | "Love of My Life" by Queen | undisclosed | SAFE |

=== Week 6 (November 20/22) ===
Performances on the thirteenth and fourteenth episode
| Ep. | # | Stage name | Song | Identity | Result |
|---|---|---|---|---|---|
| 13 | 1 | Spaghetti | "Crazy" by Gnarls Barkley | undisclosed | SAFE |
| 13 | 2 | Oyster | "Dancing Queen" by ABBA | undisclosed | SAFE |
| 13 | 3 | Schnauzer | "Rocket Man" by Elton John | undisclosed | SAFE |
| 13 | 4 | Chameleon | "תל אביב" by Omer Adam | undisclosed | SAFE |
| 13 | 5 | Gorilla | "Heroes" by Måns Zelmerlöw | undisclosed | SAFE |
| 14 | 6 | Fox | "Dog Days Are Over" by Florence and the Machine | undisclosed | SAFE |
| 14 | 7 | Octopus | "Hotel California" by The Eagles | Haim Cohen | OUT |
| 14 | 8 | Horse | "Take My Breath Away" by Berlin | undisclosed | SAFE |
| 14 | 9 | Oats | "הלב שלי” by Ishay Ribo | undisclosed | SAFE |

=== Week 7 (November 30/December 4) ===
Performances on the fifteenth episode
| # | Stage name | Song | Identity | Result |
|---|---|---|---|---|
| 1 | Fox | "Shake It Off" by Taylor Swift | Hanny Nahmias | OUT |
| 2 | Oyster | "When We Were Young" by Adele | undisclosed | SAFE |
| 3 | Schnauzer | "Locked Out of Heaven" by Bruno Mars | undisclosed | SAFE |
| 4 | Gorilla | "Lately" by Stevie Wonder | undisclosed | SAFE |

Performances on the sixteenth episode
| # | Stage name | Song | Identity | Result |
|---|---|---|---|---|
| 1 | Spaghetti | "Hey Mama" by David Guetta feat. Nicki Minaj, Bebe Rexha, & Afrojack | undisclosed | SAFE |
| 2 | Horse | "Perfect" by Ed Sheeran | Moshe Datz | OUT |
| 3 | Chameleon | "קָָָרָָמֶלָה" by Moshe Peretz | undisclosed | SAFE |
| 4 | Oats | "What a Wonderful World" by Louis Armstrong | undisclosed | SAFE |

=== Week 8 (December 6/December 11) ===
Performances on the seventeenth episode
| # | Stage name | Song | Identity | Result |
|---|---|---|---|---|
| 1 | Oats | "Rise Up" by Andra Day | undisclosed | SAFE |
| 2 | Chameleon | "Sorry" by Justin Bieber | Maor Buzaglo | OUT |
| 3 | Spaghetti | "Dancing On My Own" by Robyn | undisclosed | SAFE |

Performances on the eighteenth episode
| # | Stage name | Song | Identity | Result |
|---|---|---|---|---|
| 1 | Raccoon | "I Believe I Can Fly" by R. Kelly | Itay Levy | GUEST |
| 2 | Oyster | "Flashdance... What a Feeling" by Irene Cara | Netta Garti | OUT |
| 3 | Schnauzer | "A Whole New World" by Brad Kane & Lea Salonga | undisclosed | SAFE |
| 4 | Gorilla | "Oops!... I Did It Again" by Britney Spears | undisclosed | SAFE |

=== Week 9 - Semifinal & Final (December 13/December 18) ===
Performances on the nineteenth episode
| # | Stage name | Song | Identity | Result |
|---|---|---|---|---|
| 1 | Spaghetti | "Further Up (Na, Na, Na, Na, Na)" by Static & Ben El and Pitbull | undisclosed | SAFE |
| 2 | Oats | "Ain't No Other Man" by Christina Aguilera | undisclosed | SAFE |
| 3 | Gorilla | "7 Rings" by Ariana Grande | undisclosed | SAFE |
| 4 | Schnauzer | "Empire State of Mind (Part II) Broken Down" by Alicia Keys | Nadav Abuksis | OUT |

- Group Performance: "Rumor Has It" by Adele

Performances on the final episode
| # | Stage name | Song | Identity | Result |
Round One
| 1 | Gorilla | "Mirrors" by Justin Timberlake | undisclosed | SAFE |
| 2 | Spaghetti | "Take Me to Church" by Hozier | undisclosed | SAFE |
| 3 | Oats | "End of the Road" by Noga Erez | Rotem Shefy | THIRD |
Round Two
| 1 | Spaghetti | "Golden Boy" by Nadav Guedj | Oz Zehavi | RUNNER-UP |
| 2 | Gorilla | "Fix You" by Coldplay | Shay Gabso | WINNER |
